= National Register of Historic Places listings in Jefferson County, Kentucky =

Location of Jefferson County in Kentucky

The table below includes sites listed on the National Register of Historic Places (NRHP) in Jefferson County, Kentucky except those in the following neighborhoods/districts of Louisville: Anchorage, Downtown, The Highlands, Old Louisville, Portland and the West End (including Algonquin, California, Chickasaw, Park Hill, Parkland, Russell and Shawnee). Links to tables of listings in these other areas are provided below.

There are 516 properties and districts in the county listed on the National Register, including 8 National Historic Landmarks and 2 National Cemeteries. Latitude and longitude coordinates of the 232 sites listed on this page may be displayed in a map or exported in several formats by clicking on one of the links in the box below the map of Kentucky to the right.

This National Park Service list is complete through NPS recent listings posted September 25, 2026.

== Current listings ==
=== Other neighborhoods ===
| | Name on the Register | Image | Date listed | Location | City or Neighborhood | Description |
|---|---|---|---|---|---|---|
| 1 | Abell House | Abell House | December 5, 1980 (#80001635) | 12210 Old Shelbyville Rd. 38°14′38″N 85°31′40″W | Middletown | |
| 2 | Adath Israel Cemetery | Adath Israel Cemetery | June 22, 1982 (#82002702) | 2716 Preston Hwy. 38°12′40″N 85°44′28″W | Bradley | |
| 3 | Allison-Barrickman House | Allison-Barrickman House | July 12, 1983 (#83002628) | 6909 Wolf Pen Branch Rd. 38°19′14″N 85°37′08″W | Harrods Creek | |
| 4 | Altawood Historic District | Altawood Historic District | May 2, 2001 (#01000453) | near Altawood Ct. 38°18′08″N 85°30′09″W | Louisville | |
| 5 | Arcadia Apartments | Arcadia Apartments | November 15, 2010 (#10000906) | Main office at 1423 Arcade Ave. 38°12′25″N 85°47′02″W | Taylor-Berry | |
| 6 | Ashbourne | Ashbourne | July 12, 1983 (#83002629) | 5300 Avish Ln. 38°19′33″N 85°38′02″W | Harrods Creek | |
| 7 | Atherton Carriage House | Atherton Carriage House | August 16, 1983 (#83002630) | 3204 Falls Park Pl. 38°17′40″N 85°38′48″W | Glenview | |
| 8 | Audubon Park Historic District | Audubon Park Historic District | April 18, 1996 (#96000430) | Roughly bounded by Hess Ln. and Cardinal Dr. between Eagle Pass and Preston St. 38°12′16″N 85°43′48″W | Audubon Park | |
| 9 | Aydelott House | Aydelott House | December 5, 1980 (#80001644) | 6814 Bethany Ln. 38°06′12″N 85°53′48″W | Valley Station | |
| 10 | Rogers Clark Ballard Memorial School | Rogers Clark Ballard Memorial School | December 8, 1983 (#83003697) | 4200 Lime Kiln Ln. 38°18′47″N 85°38′44″W | Glenview | |
| 11 | Bank of Middletown | Bank of Middletown | July 12, 1983 (#83002631) | 11615 Main St. 38°14′44″N 85°32′24″W | Middletown | |
| 12 | Martin Jeff (M.J.) Bannon House | | December 29, 2006 (#06001196) | 5112 Bannon Crossings Dr. 38°10′51″N 85°37′45″W | Buechel | |
| 13 | Patrick Bannon House | Patrick Bannon House | December 5, 1980 (#80001573) | 5111 Bannon Crossings Dr. 38°10′51″N 85°37′42″W | Buechel | Originally located at 4518 Bardstown Rd. before construction. |
| 14 | Barber-Barbour House | Barber-Barbour House | December 5, 1980 (#80001582) | 6900 Transylvania Ave. 38°20′14″N 85°38′06″W | Harrods Creek | |
| 15 | Levin Bates House | Levin Bates House | December 5, 1980 (#80001574) | 10005 Wingfield Rd. 38°08′23″N 85°34′35″W | Buechel | Originally located at 7300 Bardstown Rd., but relocated for the construction of Interstate 265 |
| 16 | Beech Lawn | | December 5, 1980 (#80001585) | 8100 Six Mile Ln. 38°11′52″N 85°36′28″W | Jeffersontown | |
| 17 | Beechland | | July 12, 1983 (#83002633) | 8808 Stara Way; 38°11′43″N 85°35′53″W | Jeffersontown | Previously located at 8500 Six Mile Ln. before suburb construction. |
| 18 | Belleview | Belleview | April 2, 1992 (#92000158) | 6600 River Rd. 38°19′53″N 85°37′55″W | Harrods Creek | |
| 19 | Bellevoir-Ormsby Village | Bellevoir-Ormsby Village | December 5, 1980 (#80001632) | 1 Bellevoir Cir. 38°16′01″N 85°34′33″W | Lyndon | |
| 20 | Berry Hill | Berry Hill | July 12, 1983 (#83002635) | 5900 Burlington Ave. 38°17′44″N 85°38′27″W | Glenview | |
| 21 | Beynroth House | Beynroth House | May 31, 1984 (#84001552) | 11503 Main St. 38°14′40″N 85°32′35″W | Middletown | |
| 22 | Bingham-Hilliard Doll House | | December 5, 1980 (#80001583) | 5001 Avish Ln. 38°19′14″N 85°38′12″W | Harrods Creek | |
| 23 | Blankenbaker Station | Blankenbaker Station | December 5, 1980 (#80001642) | 21 Poplar Hill Rd. 38°17′41″N 85°39′53″W | Indian Hills | |
| 24 | Temple Bodley Summer House | | March 29, 1985 (#85002449) | 1906 Riva Ridge Rd. 38°08′59″N 85°47′46″W | Parkwood | |
| 25 | Bowman Field Historic District | Bowman Field Historic District | November 10, 1988 (#88002616) | 3345 Roger E Schupp St. 38°13′25″N 85°39′58″W | Louisville | |
| 26 | Bradford Mills | Bradford Mills | October 6, 1982 (#82001555) | 1124 Reutlinger Ave. 38°13′57″N 85°44′06″W | Germantown | |
| 27 | Bray Place | | August 11, 1980 (#80001595) | 2227 Bashford Manor Ln. 38°12′17″N 85°39′38″W | Bon Air | |
| 28 | James Brown House | James Brown House | July 12, 1983 (#83002641) | 400 Mallard Creek Rd; 38°14′22″N 85°37′54″W | St. Matthews | Formerly on Browns Ln. before apartment complex construction. |
| 29 | Theodore Brown House | Theodore Brown House | July 12, 1983 (#83002642) | 401 S. Hubbards Ln. 38°14′35″N 85°38′06″W | St. Matthews | Formerly on Browns Ln. |
| 30 | Buildings at 900–906 East Main Street | Buildings at 900–906 East Main Street | August 3, 2005 (#05000789) | 900–906 E. Main St. 38°15′15″N 85°44′08″W | Butchertown | |
| 31 | William Bull House | William Bull House | December 5, 1980 (#80001636) | 11918 Old Shelbyville Rd. 38°14′38″N 85°31′59″W | Middletown | |
| 32 | Cornelia Bush House | | May 6, 1982 (#82002708) | 316 Kenwood Dr. 38°09′30″N 85°46′09″W | Kenwood Hill | |
| 33 | S.S. Bush House | | April 30, 1979 (#79000998) | 230 Kenwood Hill Rd. 38°09′34″N 85°46′21″W | Kenwood Hill | |
| 34 | Butchertown Historic District | Butchertown Historic District | August 11, 1976 (#76000900) | Roughly bounded by Main, Hancock, Geiger, Quincy Sts., U.S. Route 42, S. Fort Beargrass Creek, and Baxter Ave.; also includes 100 Block N. Clay; 200 Block N Adams, 1300 Block Main St; 1400–1500 Blocks Mellwood Ave, 38°15′20″N 85°43′47″W | Butchertown | Boundary increase approved September 27, 2019. |
| 35 | Cardinal Hill Reservoir | Cardinal Hill Reservoir | December 5, 1980 (#80001597) | 8000 Cardinal Hill Rd. 38°08′47″N 85°48′15″W | Parkwood | |
| 36 | Carmichael House | | July 12, 1983 (#83002645) | Off Kentucky Route 155; 38°10′12″N 85°25′23″W | Fisherville | |
| 37 | Cedarbrook Farm | | December 21, 1990 (#90001835) | 4800 Springdale Rd. 38°18′50″N 85°35′35″W | Louisville | |
| 38 | Central Colored School | Central Colored School | September 13, 1976 (#76000901) | 550 W. Kentucky St. 38°14′22″N 85°45′46″W | Limerick | |
| 39 | Chenoweth Fort-Springhouse | Chenoweth Fort-Springhouse | July 1, 1975 (#75000779) | property of 12910 Old Henry Rd. 38°15′41″N 85°30′21″W | Middletown vicinity | |
| 40 | Chenoweth House | | December 5, 1980 (#80001643) | 255 Chenoweth Ln. 38°15′42″N 85°39′38″W | St. Matthews | |
| 41 | Chrisler House | Chrisler House | December 5, 1980 (#80001584) | 4508 River Rd. 38°18′02″N 85°39′51″W | Harrods Creek | |
| 42 | Churchill Downs | Churchill Downs | November 15, 1978 (#78001348) | 700 Central Ave. 38°12′16″N 85°46′16″W | South Louisville | |
| 43 | Clifton Historic District | Clifton Historic District | August 29, 1983 (#83002649) | Roughly bounded by Brownsboro Rd., William and E. Main Sts., Frankfort and N. Ewing Aves.; also roughly bounded by the CSX tracks, a Ewing Ave. alley, Interstate 64, and Mellwood Ave. 38°15′24″N 85°42′56″W | Clifton | Second set of boundaries represents a boundary increase of March 15, 1994 |
| 44 | James Clore House | | November 15, 1984 (#84000387) | 7223 Old Clore Ln. 38°21′29″N 85°36′20″W | Prospect | North of Prospect off Kentucky Route 329 |
| 45 | Clover Hill | Clover Hill | July 17, 1978 (#78001349) | 1801 Youngland Ave. 38°12′43″N 85°47′52″W | Shively | Originally at 2618 Dixie Hwy. before construction in Shively. |
| 46 | Confederate Martyrs Monument in Jeffersontown | Confederate Martyrs Monument in Jeffersontown | July 17, 1997 (#97000691) | 3702 Billtown Rd. 38°11′27″N 85°34′08″W | Jeffersontown | Jeffersontown Cemetery, located at Billtown Rd. & Watterson Trl. |
| 47 | Confederate Monument in Louisville | Confederate Monument in Louisville | July 17, 1997 (#97000689) | Junction of S. 2nd St and S. 3rd St. 38°13′08″N 85°45′42″W | University of Louisville | Across The Ville Grill restaurant. |
| 48 | Conrad-Seaton House and Archeological Site | | August 18, 2011 (#11000537) | 10320 Watterson Trl. 38°11′33″N 85°34′03″W | Louisville | |
| 49 | Cooper Memorial Church | Cooper Memorial Church | December 5, 1980 (#80001639) | 9901 Cooper Church Dr. 38°06′23″N 85°40′28″W | Okolona | Originally located at 9900 Preston Hwy. |
| 50 | Country Estates of River Road | Country Estates of River Road | April 29, 1999 (#99000495) | 4701 River Rd. 38°18′20″N 85°39′35″W | Glenview | Roughly along River Rd. and Wolf Pen Branch Rd. from Longview Ln. to 500 feet (150 m) west of U.S. Route 42 |
| 51 | Carrie Gaulbert Cox and Attilla Cox, Jr. House | | August 3, 2005 (#05000786) | 389 Mockingbird Valley Rd. 38°16′13″N 85°40′50″W | Mockingbird Valley | |
| 52 | Crescent Hill Branch Library | Crescent Hill Branch Library | March 10, 1981 (#81000282) | 2762 Frankfort Ave. 38°15′16″N 85°41′28″W | Crescent Hill | |
| 53 | Crescent Hill Historic District | Crescent Hill Historic District | November 12, 1982 (#82001556) | Roughly bounded by Brownsboro and Lexington Rds., Peterson, Zorn, and Frankfort Aves., and Crabbs Lane; 38°15′11″N 85°41′48″W | Crescent Hill | |
| 54 | Crescent Hill Reservoir | Crescent Hill Reservoir | September 10, 1979 (#79001001) | 121 Reservoir Ave. 38°15′25″N 85°40′45″W | Crescent Hill | |
| 55 | Croghan-Blankenbaker House | | February 2, 2026 (#83004593) | 4306 River Rd. 38°17′36″N 85°40′17″W | Louisville vicinity | |
| 56 | Davis Tavern | Davis Tavern | July 12, 1983 (#83002651) | 11803 Old Shelbyville Rd. 38°14′43″N 85°32′14″W | Middletown | |
| 57 | Diamond Fruit Farm | | July 12, 1983 (#83002652) | 3301 Hurstbourne Springs Dr. 38°12′04″N 85°36′17″W | Jeffersontown | Formerly 8101 Six Mile Lane, current location of an apartment complex near DICK'S Sporting Goods. |
| 58 | Dogwood Hill | Dogwood Hill | February 26, 1993 (#93000043) | 7001 U.S. Highway 42; 38°18′48″N 85°37′41″W | Lyndon | |
| 59 | Drumanard | Drumanard | July 12, 1983 (#83002665) | 6401 Wolf Pen Branch Rd.; also the Mrs. A. M. Watson House and the Strater House; 38°19′29″N 85°37′30″W | Harrods Creek | Second and third houses represent a boundary increase of January 29, 1992. Originally listed under the name "Fitzhugh House"; name changed in connection with the boundary increase |
| 60 | Stuart E. and Annie L. Duncan Estate | | March 12, 2003 (#02001468) | 404 Mockingbird Valley Rd. 38°16′28″N 85°41′26″W | Mockingbird Valley | |
| 61 | East Smoketown District | | November 1, 2023 (#100009533) | 733, 801-827, 829 Logan Street, 929, 930 Mason Avenue, 925, 935 Lampton Street, South Fork of Beargrass Creek; 38°14′28″N 85°44′17″W | Louisville | |
| 62 | Eastwood School | | July 29, 2014 (#14000458) | 610 Gilliland Rd. 38°13′35″N 85°27′28″W | Eastwood | |
| 63 | Eclipse Woolen Mill | Eclipse Woolen Mill | December 22, 1978 (#78001352) | 1044 E. Chestnut St. 38°14′56″N 85°43′57″W | Phoenix Hill | |
| 64 | Edgewood | Edgewood | August 16, 1983 (#83002660) | 3605 Glenview Ave. 38°18′02″N 85°38′39″W | Brownsboro Farm | |
| 65 | Eight-Mile House | Eight-Mile House | March 26, 1976 (#76000904) | 8113 Shelbyville Rd. 38°14′56″N 85°36′12″W | Lyndon | |
| 66 | Emerson School | Emerson School | May 3, 1982 (#82002710) | 1100 Sylvia St. 38°13′18″N 85°44′23″W | Schnitzelburg | |
| 67 | John G. Epping Bottling Works | | June 24, 2026 (#100010288) | 702, 705, 708, 712, 718, 725 Logan Street; 38°14′38″N 85°44′18″W | Louisville | |
| 68 | Epworth Methodist Evangelical Church | Epworth Methodist Evangelical Church | September 6, 1983 (#83002661) | 412 M. St. 38°12′32″N 85°45′56″W | South Louisville | |
| 69 | Falls City Jeans and Woolen Mills | Falls City Jeans and Woolen Mills | October 6, 1982 (#82001557) | 1010 S. Preston St. 38°14′14″N 85°44′57″W | Shelby Park | |
| 70 | David Farnsley House | | July 12, 1983 (#83002663) | 4816 Cane Run Rd. 38°11′00″N 85°51′25″W | St. Dennis | |
| 71 | Farnsley–Moremen House | Farnsley–Moremen House | April 20, 1979 (#79003117) | 7410 Moorman Rd. 38°05′52″N 85°53′52″W | Bethany | |
| 72 | Fincastle | Fincastle | March 24, 2000 (#00000272) | 7501 Wolf Pen Branch Rd. 38°19′55″N 85°36′28″W | Prospect | |
| 73 | J. Finzer and Brothers Company Building | J. Finzer and Brothers Company Building | April 18, 2003 (#03000264) | 419 Finzer St. 38°14′40″N 85°44′48″W | Smoketown | |
| 74 | Fisher House | Fisher House | July 12, 1983 (#83002667) | 15103 Old Taylorsville Rd. 38°11′26″N 85°27′48″W | Fisherville | |
| 75 | Fishpool Plantation | | July 12, 1983 (#83002668) | 9701 Cooper Church Dr. 38°06′26″N 85°40′51″W | Louisville | Formerly 9710 Preston Highway, before construction in Hillview. Current location can be found at Kurtz Ave. and McCrea Ln. |
| 76 | Ford Motor Company, Louisville Plant | Ford Motor Company, Louisville Plant | November 25, 2005 (#05001318) | 2520 S. 3rd St. 38°12′48″N 85°45′46″W | University of Louisville | |
| 77 | Henry Frank House | Henry Frank House | December 5, 1980 (#80001637) | 218 S. Madison Ave. 38°14′31″N 85°32′22″W | Middletown | |
| 78 | Harriet Funk House | Harriet Funk House | December 5, 1980 (#80001587) | 1940 Hurstbourne Cir. 38°13′08″N 85°35′10″W | Jeffersontown | |
| 79 | James H. Funk House | James H. Funk House | December 5, 1980 (#80001588) | 9000 Taylorsville Rd; 38°12′51″N 85°35′27″W | Jeffersontown | |
| 80 | Gaar-Fenton House | | July 12, 1983 (#83002670) | 4124 Nachand Ln. 38°11′06″N 85°37′00″W | Buechel | The house is not there anymore. |
| 81 | Gaffney House | Gaffney House | December 8, 1983 (#83003710) | 4515 River Rd. 38°18′08″N 85°39′48″W | Glenview | |
| 82 | Gardencourt Historic District | Gardencourt Historic District | December 1, 1988 (#88002653) | 1010 Alta Vista Rd. 38°14′18″N 85°41′11″W | Cherokee-Seneca | |
| 83 | German Evangelical Church of Christ Complex | German Evangelical Church of Christ Complex | May 21, 1987 (#87000795) | 1236 E. Breckinridge St. 38°14′24″N 85°43′52″W | Germantown | |
| 84 | Glenview Historic District | Glenview Historic District | August 16, 1983 (#83002673) | Glenview Ave. 38°18′32″N 85°39′06″W | Glenview | |
| 85 | Roscoe Goose House | Roscoe Goose House | September 29, 2015 (#15000651) | 3012 S. 3rd St. 38°12′21″N 85°45′50″W | South Louisville | |
| 86 | Cornelia Gordon House | | May 6, 1982 (#82002711) | 308 Kenwood Hill Rd. 38°09′31″N 85°46′19″W | Kenwood Hill | |
| 87 | Green Tree Manor Residential Historic District | | November 21, 1991 (#91001664) | 107 Fenley Ave. 38°15′21″N 85°40′10″W | Crescent Hill | |
| 88 | Mary Alice Hadley House | | July 10, 2008 (#08000649) | 1638 Story Ave. 38°15′35″N 85°43′12″W | Butchertown | |
| 89 | Haldeman House | Haldeman House | December 8, 1983 (#83003712) | 3609 Glenview Ave. 38°18′06″N 85°38′46″W | Northfield | |
| 90 | Harrods Creek Historic District | Harrods Creek Historic District | November 22, 1991 (#91001679) | Junction of Upper River and Wolf Pen Branch Rds. 38°19′22″N 85°38′08″W | Harrods Creek | |
| 91 | Head House | Head House | June 28, 1974 (#74000885) | 11601 Main St. 38°14′43″N 85°32′30″W | Middletown | |
| 92 | Herr-Rudy Family Houses | | May 19, 1978 (#78001354) | 520 Old Stone Ln., 4319 Westport Rd., 4417 Westport Rd., 612 Rudy Ln., 726 Waterford Rd., 1823 Ballard Mill Ln., and 1705 Lynn Way; 38°16′13″N 85°38′20″W | Graymoor-Devondale, Indian Hills, Windy Hills | |
| 93 | John H. Heywood Elementary School | John H. Heywood Elementary School | September 6, 1983 (#83002679) | 422 Heywood Ave. 38°12′22″N 85°46′00″W | South Louisville | |
| 94 | Hikes Family Houses | | March 21, 1978 (#78001355) | 4118 Taylorsville Rd., 2806 Meadow Dr., 3026 Hikes Ln. 38°12′42″N 85°38′14″W | Bon Air, Hikes Point, Klondike | |
| 95 | Hikes-Hunsinger House | | October 10, 1975 (#75000769) | 2834 Hikes Ln. 38°12′27″N 85°38′48″W | Klondike | |
| 96 | Abraham Hite House | | December 5, 1980 (#80001575) | 4215 Starlite Ln. 38°11′11″N 85°37′14″W | Buechel | |
| 97 | Hite-Chenoweth House | | December 5, 1980 (#80001576) | 4219 Starlite Ln. 38°11′10″N 85°37′12″W | Buechel | |
| 98 | Andrew Hoke House | | July 14, 1983 (#83002681) | 2700 Llandovery Dr. 38°12′22″N 85°34′15″W | Jeffersontown | |
| 99 | Holy Name Church Rectory, Convent and School | Holy Name Church Rectory, Convent and School | May 13, 1982 (#82002712) | 2920 S. 3rd St, 2914 S. 3rd St., 2911 S. 4th St and 2917 S. 4th St. 38°12′24″N 85°45′51″W | South Louisville | |
| 100 | Holy Rosary Academy | | April 3, 2026 (#100012873) | 4801 Southside Drive; 38°12′24″N 85°45′51″W | Louisville | |
| 101 | Hook and Ladder Company No. 2 | Hook and Ladder Company No. 2 | November 7, 1980 (#80001601) | 221 S. Hancock St. 38°15′10″N 85°44′31″W | Phoenix Hill | |
| 102 | Hook and Ladder Company No. 3 | Hook and Ladder Company No. 3 | November 7, 1980 (#80001602) | 1761 Frankfort Ave. 38°15′25″N 85°43′00″W | Clifton | |
| 103 | Hope Worsted Mills | Hope Worsted Mills | January 19, 1996 (#95001543) | 942 E. Kentucky St. 38°14′09″N 85°44′14″W | Germantown | |
| 104 | Robert Hord House | Robert Hord House | July 12, 1983 (#83002682) | 15903 Shelbyville Rd. 38°14′08″N 85°27′31″W | Eastwood | |
| 105 | Horner House | Horner House | August 16, 1983 (#83002683) | 3509 Woodside Rd. 38°18′07″N 85°39′04″W | Glenview | |
| 106 | Immanuel Chapel Protestant Episcopal Church | Immanuel Chapel Protestant Episcopal Church | September 6, 1983 (#83002687) | 410 W Fairmont Ave. 38°11′42″N 85°46′04″W | Wyandotte | |
| 107 | Charles D. Jacob Elementary School | Charles D. Jacob Elementary School | February 28, 2012 (#12000044) | 3670 Wheeler Ave. 38°11′31″N 85°47′20″W | Jacobs | |
| 108 | Jefferson Jacob School | Jefferson Jacob School | August 6, 2012 (#12000449) | 6519 Jacob School Rd. 38°20′43″N 85°37′29″W | Prospect | |
| 109 | James Taylor-Jacob School Neighborhood Historic District | | October 1, 2026 (#100013466) | Roughly bounded by River Rd, Jacob School Rd, and property boundaries of the houses along Rest Way, Bass Road, and Duroc Ave. 38°20′48″N 85°37′24″W | Prospect | |
| 110 | Jeffersontown Colored School | | March 29, 1985 (#85002448) | 10400 Shelby St. 38°11′47″N 85°33′54″W | Jeffersontown | |
| 111 | J. Stoddard Johnston Elementary School | J. Stoddard Johnston Elementary School | December 3, 2008 (#82005031) | 2301 Bradley Ave. 38°12′53″N 85°44′53″W | St. Joseph | |
| 112 | Jones House | | July 12, 1983 (#83002689) | 4998 Valley Station Rd. 38°06′14″N 85°51′14″W | Valley Station | |
| 113 | Judge Kirby House | | July 12, 1983 (#83002690) | 4104 Stony Brook Dr. 38°11′15″N 85°35′49″W | Jeffersontown | |
| 114 | Kennedy-Hunsinger Farm | | July 12, 1983 (#83002685) | 4334 Taylorsville Rd. 38°12′54″N 85°36′31″W | Jeffersontown | |
| 115 | Kentucky Wagon Works | Kentucky Wagon Works | September 6, 1983 (#83002692) | 2601 S. 3rd St. 38°12′39″N 85°45′40″W | University of Louisville | |
| 116 | Harriet Griswold and Judge Samuel Bonner Kirby House | | July 15, 2020 (#100005344) | 2722 Maxey Ln. 38°17′46″N 85°30′44″W | Louisville | |
| 117 | The KFC White House Building | | September 9, 2024 (#100010765) | 1441 Gardiner Lane; 38°11′53″N 85°41′42″W | Louisville | |
| 118 | Kosmosdale Depot | | April 9, 1984 (#84001562) | 8214 Depot Ln. 38°01′57″N 85°54′36″W | Valley Station | Off of Dixie Hwy. (U.S. 31W) |
| 119 | KYANG Site (15JF267) | | September 12, 1972 (#72000539) | Address Restricted | Louisville | Also known as the Kentucky Air National Guard Site. Located on the grounds of Louisville International Airport. |
| 120 | Ladless Hill | Ladless Hill | August 16, 1983 (#83002693) | 6501 Longview Ln. 38°17′59″N 85°39′38″W | Glenview | |
| 121 | Leatherman House | | December 5, 1980 (#80001589) | 3606 College Dr. 38°11′32″N 85°34′01″W | Jeffersontown | |
| 122 | Addison W. Lee House | Addison W. Lee House | August 2, 2000 (#00000868) | 4218 River Rd. 38°17′37″N 85°40′29″W | Longview | |
| 123 | Dr. John Lewis House | Dr. John Lewis House | April 9, 1984 (#84001564) | 220 Ridgeway Ave. 38°15′22″N 85°38′56″W | St. Matthews | |
| 124 | Simeon Lewis Rural Historic District | | November 25, 2005 (#05001319) | 5215 Bardstown Rd. 38°10′24″N 85°36′31″W | Buechel | |
| 125 | Lewiston House | Lewiston House | December 5, 1980 (#80001645) | 4902 Ranchland Dr. 38°10′21″N 85°49′48″W | Valley Station | |
| 126 | Limerick Historic District | Limerick Historic District | September 13, 1978 (#78001360) | Roughly bounded by Breckinridge, Oak, 5th, and 8th Sts.; also between Breckinridge, Oak, 5th, and 8th Sts. 38°14′15″N 85°45′48″W | Limerick | Second set of boundaries represents a boundary increase of December 23, 1983 |
| 127 | Lincliff | Lincliff | August 16, 1983 (#83002694) | 6100 Longview Ln. 38°17′45″N 85°39′45″W | Glenview | |
| 128 | Lindenberger-Grant House | | July 25, 1996 (#96000793) | 8200 Railroad Ave. 38°15′45″N 85°36′09″W | Lyndon | |
| 129 | Little Loomhouses | Little Loomhouses | June 30, 1975 (#75000770) | 328 Kenwood Hill Rd. 38°09′28″N 85°46′13″W | Kenwood Hill | |
| 130 | Locust Avenue | | July 12, 1983 (#83002695) | 1814 Fern Valley Rd. 38°09′20″N 85°39′59″W | Knopp | |
| 131 | Locust Grove | Locust Grove | March 11, 1971 (#71000347) | 561 Blankenbaker Ln. 38°17′14″N 85°39′43″W | Riverwood vicinity | |
| 132 | Long Run Baptist Church and Cemetery | Long Run Baptist Church and Cemetery | August 6, 1975 (#75000768) | 16106 Old Stage Coach Rd. 38°15′18″N 85°24′48″W | Eastwood | |
| 133 | Louisville Cotton Mills | Louisville Cotton Mills | October 6, 1982 (#82001560) | 1008 Goss Ave. and 1318 McHenry St. 38°13′46″N 85°44′22″W | Schnitzelburg | Boundary increase February 11, 2016 |
| 134 | Louisville Veterans Administration Hospital | | May 22, 2018 (#100002460) | 800 Zorn Ave. 38°16′14″N 85°41′52″W | Brownsboro-Zorn | |
| 135 | Louisville Water Company Pumping Station | Louisville Water Company Pumping Station | November 11, 1971 (#71000348) | 3005 River Rd. 38°16′50″N 85°42′04″W | Butchertown | |
| 136 | James Russell Lowell Elementary School | James Russell Lowell Elementary School | September 6, 1983 (#83002697) | 4501 Crittenden Dr. 38°11′17″N 85°44′59″W | Beechmont | |
| 137 | Lyndon Cottage | | May 30, 1990 (#90000781) | 9002 Hurstbourne Club Ln. 38°14′21″N 85°35′22″W | Hurstbourne | The Terminus Building. |
| 138 | Lynn Acres Garden Apartments | | March 17, 2015 (#15000083) | 100 E. Southland Blvd. 38°10′18″N 85°45′47″W | Southside | |
| 139 | Lynnford-Lyndon Hall | | April 18, 1985 (#85002447) | 8222 Shelbyville Rd. 38°14′23″N 85°35′26″W | Lyndon | |
| 140 | Lynnview Historic District | | September 4, 2024 (#100010766) | Roughly bounded by Preston Hwy on the west, Gilmore Ln on the south, Breitenstein Ave on the east, and Evergreen Cemetery to the north 38°10′44″N 85°42′42″W | Lynnview | |
| 141 | Maghera Glass-Ormsby Hall | | December 5, 1980 (#80001633) | 8521 La Grange Rd. 38°16′20″N 85°35′46″W | Lyndon | |
| 142 | Jefferson Marders House | Jefferson Marders House | July 12, 1983 (#83002698) | 211 S. Madison Ave. 38°14′53″N 85°32′26″W | Middletown | Destroyed in September 2005 and replaced with condominia |
| 143 | Masonic Hall | Masonic Hall | July 12, 1983 (#83002701) | 15116 Old Taylorsville Rd. 38°11′22″N 85°27′44″W | Fisherville | |
| 144 | Masonic Widows and Orphans Home | Masonic Widows and Orphans Home | September 6, 2002 (#02000916) | 3701 Frankfort Ave. 38°15′20″N 85°39′54″W | St. Matthews vicinity | |
| 145 | McBride's Harrods Creek Landing | McBride's Harrods Creek Landing | February 11, 2011 (#11000006) | 5913 River Rd. 38°19′30″N 85°38′33″W | Harrods Creek | |
| 146 | McClure House | | July 28, 1984 (#84001581) | 8209 Old Westport Rd. 38°16′48″N 85°36′00″W | Lyndon | |
| 147 | Merriwether House | Merriwether House | March 22, 1989 (#87000361) | 6421 River Rd. 38°19′41″N 85°37′50″W | Prospect | |
| 148 | Middletown Inn | Middletown Inn | April 9, 1984 (#84001580) | 11705 Main St. 38°14′44″N 85°32′22″W | Middletown | |
| 149 | Middletown United Methodist Church | Middletown United Methodist Church | December 5, 1980 (#80001638) | 11902 Old Shelbyville Rd. 38°14′42″N 85°32′22″W | Middletown | |
| 150 | Midlands | Midlands | August 16, 1983 (#83002706) | 25 Poplar Hill Rd. 38°17′33″N 85°39′44″W | Indian Hills | |
| 151 | Mockingbird Valley Historic District | | April 13, 2007 (#06000815) | Roughly bounded by River Rd., Indian Hills Trail, Fairway, Swing, Brownsboro, Jarvis, and Green Ridge Ln. 38°16′21″N 85°40′57″W | Mockingbird Valley | |
| 152 | Simeon Moore House | Simeon Moore House | December 5, 1980 (#80001581) | 17317 Taylorsville Rd. 38°09′29″N 85°26′05″W | Fisherville | |
| 153 | Most Blessed Sacrament School | Most Blessed Sacrament School | February 11, 2011 (#11000008) | 1128 Berry Blvd. 38°11′45″N 85°46′55″W | Wyandotte | |
| 154 | Municipal College Campus, Simmons University | Municipal College Campus, Simmons University | November 21, 1976 (#76000906) | 1018 S. 7th St. 38°14′22″N 85°45′53″W | Limerick | |
| 155 | Dr. John Murray Farm | | July 12, 1983 (#83002708) | 3000 Murray Hill Pike. 38°17′25″N 85°35′13″W | Lyndon | |
| 156 | Nitta Yuma Historic District | Nitta Yuma Historic District | February 10, 1983 (#83002714) | 5028 Nitta Yuma Dr., 5040 Nitta Yuma Dr., 5044 Nitta Yuma Dr., and 5051 Nitta Yuma Dr. 38°19′20″N 85°37′41″W | Harrods Creek | |
| 157 | Oakdale District | Oakdale District | September 6, 1983 (#83002715) | Roughly bounded by Terrace Park, Southern Parkway, 4th and Kenton Sts. 38°11′59″N 85°46′00″W | South Louisville | |
| 158 | Olmsted Park System | Olmsted Park System | May 17, 1982 (#82002715) | Algonquin, Cherokee, Eastern, Southern, North, and South Western Parkways; 38°13′06″N 85°46′34″W | Louisville | |
| 159 | Omer/Pound House | | July 12, 1983 (#83002716) | 6609 Billtown Rd. 38°08′55″N 85°32′34″W | Fern Creek | |
| 160 | Oxmoor | Oxmoor | July 13, 1976 (#76000907) | 720 Oxmoor Ave. 38°14′15″N 85°36′28″W | Norwood vicinity | |
| 161 | Paget House and Heigold House Facade | Paget House and Heigold House Facade | November 17, 1978 (#78001363) | 1562 Fulton St. and 1501 River Rd. 38°15′54″N 85°43′40″W | Butchertown | Heigold House facade was relocated to Frankfort Avenue in 2007. |
| 162 | Pennsylvania Run Presbyterian Church | Pennsylvania Run Presbyterian Church | July 12, 1983 (#83002720) | 8405 Pennsylvania Run Rd. 38°07′36″N 85°37′46″W | Okolona | |
| 163 | Peterson Avenue Hill | Peterson Avenue Hill | March 24, 1980 (#80001614) | 309 S. Peterson Ave. 38°15′00″N 85°41′50″W | Crescent Hill | |
| 164 | Peterson–Dumesnil House | Peterson–Dumesnil House | October 31, 1975 (#75000773) | 310 S. Peterson Ave. 38°15′04″N 85°41′46″W | Crescent Hill | |
| 165 | Peyton-Cooper House | | April 30, 2026 (#100012871) | 7849 Wolf Pen Branch Road; 38°19′40″N 85°36′00″W | Prospect | |
| 166 | Phoenix Hill Historic District | Phoenix Hill Historic District | January 10, 1983 (#83002721) | Roughly bounded by Main, Campbell, Jefferson, Chestnut, Broadway, Hancock, Walnut, Shelby, Market, and Floyd Sts. 38°14′52″N 85°44′12″W | Phoenix Hill | |
| 167 | Pirtle House | Pirtle House | August 16, 1983 (#83002722) | 5803 Orion Rd. 38°18′14″N 85°38′47″W | Glenview | |
| 168 | Preston-St. Catherine Street Historic District | Preston-St. Catherine Street Historic District | May 2, 1985 (#85000953) | Roughly bounded by Roland, Preston, Jackson, St. Catherine, and Floyd Sts. 38°14′12″N 85°45′00″W | Shelby Park | |
| 169 | Reliance Varnish Company Building | | April 28, 2025 (#100011757) | 915 East Kentucky Street; 38°14′10″N 85°44′18″W | | |
| 170 | Repton | Repton | May 13, 1982 (#82002717) | 314 Ridgedale Rd. 38°15′37″N 85°41′48″W | Clifton Heights | |
| 171 | Ridgeway | Ridgeway | April 11, 1973 (#73000810) | 4095 Massie Ave. 38°15′50″N 85°38′53″W | St. Matthews vicinity | |
| 172 | Rockdale | | July 12, 1983 (#83002727) | 12109 Taylorsville Rd. 38°11′14″N 85°31′56″W | Jeffersontown | |
| 173 | Rockledge | Rockledge | August 16, 1983 (#83002728) | 4810 River Rd. 38°18′21″N 85°39′13″W | Glenview | |
| 174 | St. Bartholomew Parish School | | August 5, 2010 (#10000531) | 2036 Buechel Bank Rd. 38°11′05″N 85°38′51″W | Newburg | |
| 175 | St. Bonifacius Kirche Complex | St. Bonifacius Kirche Complex | October 29, 1982 (#82001562) | 501 E. Liberty St., 531 E. Liberty St. 38°15′05″N 85°44′38″W | Phoenix Hill | |
| 176 | St. Elizabeth of Hungary Roman Catholic Church | St. Elizabeth of Hungary Roman Catholic Church | May 6, 1982 (#82002721) | 1024 E. Burnett Ave., 1028 E. Burnett Ave. 38°13′22″N 85°44′23″W | Schnitzelburg | |
| 177 | Saint Frances of Rome School | Saint Frances of Rome School | March 26, 1987 (#87000515) | 2105 Payne St., 2117 Payne St. 38°15′10″N 85°42′25″W | Clifton | |
| 178 | St. Therese Roman Catholic Church, School, and Rectory | St. Therese Roman Catholic Church, School, and Rectory | July 28, 1975 (#75000776) | 1010 Schiller Ave. 38°14′07″N 85°43′55″W | Germantown | |
| 179 | St. Vincent DePaul Church, Rectory, School, St. Ursula Home and Convent | St. Vincent DePaul Church, Rectory, School, St. Ursula Home and Convent | November 15, 1984 (#84000380) | 1201 S. Shelby St., and 1214 Logan St. 38°13′59″N 85°44′28″W | Shelby Park | |
| 180 | Selema Hall | Selema Hall | September 6, 1978 (#78001366) | 2837 Riedling Dr. 38°15′42″N 85°41′32″W | Butchertown and Clifton | |
| 181 | Seventh Street School | | August 4, 2016 (#16000499) | 1512 S. 7th St. 38°13′33″N 85°46′11″W | Louisville | No longer extant. |
| 182 | Shady Brook Farm | | August 16, 1983 (#83002731) | 5802 River Rd; 38°19′07″N 85°38′21″W | Harrods Creek | |
| 183 | Shelby Park Branch Library | Shelby Park Branch Library | December 3, 1980 (#80001619) | 600 E. Oak St. 38°14′01″N 85°44′44″W | Shelby Park | |
| 184 | Shelby Park Historic District | Shelby Park Historic District | April 25, 2024 (#100010247) | Roughly bounded by I-65 to the west, East Kentucky Street to the north, and CSX Railroad tracks to the west and south 38°14′02″N 85°44′48″W | Shelby Park | |
| 185 | Shwab House | Shwab House | August 16, 1983 (#83002733) | 4812 River Rd. 38°18′28″N 85°39′18″W | Glenview | |
| 186 | Smoketown Historic District | Smoketown Historic District | July 3, 1997 (#97000661) | Roughly bounded by Preston, Caldwell, and Jacob Sts., and the alley east of Shelby St. 38°14′27″N 85°44′38″W | Smoketown | |
| 187 | Snapp House | | December 5, 1980 (#80001577) | current location of 8621 Summertree Ln. 38°07′41″N 85°34′37″W | Buechel | Formerly at 8300 Bardstown Rd. |
| 188 | Soldiers Retreat | | July 12, 1983 (#83002734) | 9300 Seaton Springs Pkwy. 38°14′08″N 85°34′43″W | Lyndon | |
| 189 | South Louisville Reformed Church | South Louisville Reformed Church | September 6, 1983 (#83002735) | 1060 Lynnhurst Ave. 38°10′41″N 85°46′55″W | Beechmont | |
| 190 | Southern Heights-Beechmont District | Southern Heights-Beechmont District | September 6, 1983 (#83002736) | Roughly bounded by Southern Parkway, 6th St., Ashland, and Southern Heights Aves.; also roughly bounded by W. Southern Heights to the north, S. 3rd St to the east, Southern Parkway, Brookline Ave, Belleview Ave, and Bluegrass Ave to the south, and on the south, and Cliff Ave on the west 38°11′12″N 85°46′08″W | Beechmont | Second set of addresses represent a boundary increase approved September 4, 2024. |
| 191 | Spring Station | Spring Station | December 12, 1977 (#77000627) | 3241 Trinity Rd. 38°14′47″N 85°40′12″W | Rockcreek-Lexington Road | |
| 192 | Steam Engine Company No. 3 | Steam Engine Company No. 3 | November 7, 1980 (#80001629) | 802 E. Main St., 804 E. Main St. 38°15′16″N 85°44′15″W | Butchertown | |
| 193 | Steam Engine Company No. 4 | Steam Engine Company No. 4 | November 7, 1980 (#80001630) | 1024 Logan St. 38°14′09″N 85°44′23″W | Shelby Park | |
| 194 | Steam Engine Company No. 10 | Steam Engine Company No. 10 | November 7, 1980 (#80001622) | 1419 E. Washington St. 38°15′29″N 85°43′36″W | Butchertown | |
| 195 | Steam Engine Company No. 18 | Steam Engine Company No. 18 | November 7, 1980 (#80001624) | 2600 S. 4th St. 38°12′41″N 85°45′53″W | South Louisville | |
| 196 | Steam Engine Company No. 21 | Steam Engine Company No. 21 | November 7, 1980 (#80001627) | 2620 Frankfort Ave. 38°15′15″N 85°41′44″W | Parkland | |
| 197 | Steam Engine Company No. 22 | Steam Engine Company No. 22 | November 7, 1980 (#80001628) | 3627 W. Broadway; 38°15′01″N 85°48′48″W | Shawnee | |
| 198 | Arthur P. Stitzel House | Arthur P. Stitzel House | March 22, 1989 (#87000366) | 9707 Shelbyville Rd. 38°14′51″N 85°34′26″W | Wildwood | |
| 199 | Zodia Stivers House | Zodia Stivers House | December 5, 1980 (#80001578) | 3701 Montclair Ave. 38°11′43″N 85°37′08″W | Buechel | |
| 200 | Ben Stout House | | July 12, 1983 (#83002738) | 8630 Stout Rd. 38°07′16″N 85°32′12″W | Jeffersontown | |
| 201 | Stuart Building | Stuart Building | March 14, 1985 (#85000560) | 601 W. Oak St. 38°14′08″N 85°45′50″W | Limerick | |
| 202 | Stucky House | | December 5, 1980 (#80001590) | 3504 Marlin Dr. 38°11′41″N 85°34′27″W | Jeffersontown | |
| 203 | Sunnyside | Sunnyside | March 14, 1985 (#85000561) | 3020 Poppy Way; 38°14′51″N 85°40′43″W | Cherokee Gardens | |
| 204 | Taggart House | | December 5, 1980 (#80001579) | 5000 Bardstown Rd. 38°10′29″N 85°37′03″W | Buechel | Burned down in the early 1980s |
| 205 | Zachary Taylor House | Zachary Taylor House | October 15, 1966 (#66000359) | 5608 Apache Rd. 38°16′45″N 85°38′50″W | Indian Hills vicinity | Boyhood home of the twelfth President of the United States; also known as Springfield |
| 206 | Zachary Taylor National Cemetery | Zachary Taylor National Cemetery | November 3, 1983 (#83003733) | 4701 Brownsboro Rd. 38°16′40″N 85°38′36″W | St. Matthews vicinity | |
| 207 | Three Mile Tollhouse | | October 1, 1990 (#90001489) | 2311 Frankfort Ave. 38°15′13″N 85°42′10″W | Clifton | |
| 208 | George H. Tingley Elementary School | George H. Tingley Elementary School | July 12, 1984 (#84001586) | 1311 S. Preston St., 1317 S. Preston St. 38°13′50″N 85°44′59″W | Shelby Park | |
| 209 | James Trigg House | James Trigg House | December 5, 1980 (#80001640) | 7112 Covered Bridge Rd. 38°21′13″N 85°36′40″W | Prospect | |
| 210 | Hazael Tucker House | | December 5, 1980 (#80001591) | 2406 Tucker Station Rd. 38°12′20″N 85°31′39″W | Jeffersontown | |
| 211 | Tway House | | December 5, 1980 (#80001592) | 10235 Timberwood Cir. 38°13′53″N 85°33′58″W | Jeffersontown | |
| 212 | Tyler Settlement Rural Historic District | Tyler Settlement Rural Historic District | May 1, 1986 (#86001045) | Roughly bounded by the Southern railroad line, Taylorsville Rd., and Jeffersontown City; 38°11′13″N 85°31′54″W | Jeffersontown vicinity | |
| 213 | Moses Tyler House | | July 12, 1983 (#83002744) | 3200 Tucker Station Rd. 38°11′46″N 85°32′02″W | Jeffersontown | |
| 214 | Robert Tyler Place | | July 12, 1983 (#83002739) | 12603 Taylorsville Rd. 38°11′28″N 85°31′13″W | Jeffersontown | |
| 215 | University of Louisville Belknap Campus | University of Louisville Belknap Campus | June 25, 1976 (#76000908) | 2301 S. 3rd St. 38°12′54″N 85°45′36″W | University of Louisville | Includes Grawemeyer Hall and the University of Louisville School of Law. |
| 216 | University of Louisville Library | | July 30, 2013 (#13000561) | 2200 S. First St. 38°12′55″N 85°45′33″W | University of Louisville | |
| 217 | Ursuline Academy and Convent | Ursuline Academy and Convent | June 13, 1978 (#78001369) | 800 E. Chestnut St. 38°14′48″N 85°44′20″W | Phoenix Hill | |
| 218 | Von Allmen Dairy Farm House | Von Allmen Dairy Farm House | December 11, 2007 (#07001251) | 5050 Norton Healthcare Blvd. 38°18′56″N 85°34′21″W | Worthington | |
| 219 | Wade-Braden District | | April 23, 2024 (#100010246) | 4010 Clyde Drive & 4403 Virginia Avenue; 38°14′26″N 85°49′37″W | | |
| 220 | Waverly Hills Tuberculosis Sanitarium Historic Buildings | Waverly Hills Tuberculosis Sanitarium Historic Buildings | July 12, 1983 (#83002746) | 4400 Paralee Dr. 38°07′48″N 85°50′31″W | Waverly Hills | |
| 221 | Westwood Farm | | July 2, 1983 (#83002749) | 3503 Westwood Farms Dr. 38°11′48″N 85°36′45″W | Jeffersontown | Formerly 7800 Six Mile Ln. |
| 222 | Widman's Saloon and Grocery | Widman's Saloon and Grocery | June 13, 1990 (#89002016) | 2317 Frankfort Ave., 2319 Frankfort Ave. 38°15′13″N 85°42′09″W | Clifton | |
| 223 | Wilhoyte House | Wilhoyte House | December 5, 1980 (#80001641) | 8610 Westover Dr. 38°21′21″N 85°35′47″W | Prospect | |
| 224 | Abraham L. Williams L & N Guest House | Abraham L. Williams L & N Guest House | December 5, 1980 (#80001634) | 4201 Murphy Ln. 38°18′21″N 85°32′00″W | Lyndon | |
| 225 | Winchester House | Winchester House | July 12, 1983 (#83002751) | 613 Breckenridge Ln. 38°14′37″N 85°38′44″W | St. Matthews | |
| 226 | Winkworth | Winkworth | August 16, 1983 (#83002752) | 3200 Boxhill Ln. 38°18′05″N 85°39′28″W | Glenview | |
| 227 | Wirth, Lang and Company-The Louisville Leather Company Tannery Building | Wirth, Lang and Company-The Louisville Leather Company Tannery Building | August 2, 2000 (#00000869) | 711 Brent St., 715 Brent St. 38°14′37″N 85°44′05″W | Smoketown | |
| 228 | Wolf Pen Branch Mill | | January 5, 1978 (#78001344) | 7839 Wolf Pen Branch Rd. 38°19′49″N 85°35′47″W | Harrods Creek | |
| 229 | Woodside/John T. Bate House | Woodside/John T. Bate House | August 16, 1983 (#83002753) | 3100 Woodside Rd. 38°17′39″N 85°38′53″W | Glenview | |
| 230 | Yager House | Yager House | July 12, 1983 (#83002755) | 15905 Aiken Rd. 38°16′10″N 85°28′19″W | Louisville | |
| 231 | George B. Yenowine House | | December 28, 1980 (#80004599) | 1021 Watterson Trl. 38°13′39″N 85°32′56″W | Middletown | Currently the Sports & Fitness Center |
| 232 | Yenowine-Kennedy House | Yenowine-Kennedy House | July 12, 1983 (#83002756) | 4420 Taylorsville Rd. 38°13′05″N 85°36′12″W | Jeffersontown | |

== Former listings ==
| | Name on the Register | Image | Date listed | Date removed | Location | City or town | Description |
|---|---|---|---|---|---|---|---|
| 1 | Allen House | | July 12, 1983 (#80001580) | August 16, 1990 | 2609 Hunsinger Lane | Jeffersontown | |
| 2 | John Bates House | | July 12, 1983 (#83002632) | July 5, 1990 | Pennsylvania Run Rd. | Louisville | |
| 3 | William F. Bryan House | | July 12, 1983 (#83002644) | June 14, 1989 | 8505 Six Mile Lane | Jeffersontown vicinity | Demolished |
| 4 | East Cedar Hill Institute | | December 5, 1980 (#80001580) | August 16, 1990 | Clark Station Rd. | Fisherville | |
| 5 | Floore House | | December 5, 1980 (#80001586) | August 16, 1990 | Taylorsville Rd. | Jeffersontown | |
| 6 | Gilliland House | | July 12, 1983 (#83002671) | July 5, 1990 | 1601 Gilliland Rd. | Fisherville | |
| 7 | Hewett House | | August 16, 1983 (#83002678) | February 5, 1991 | 3605 Woodside Rd. | Louisville | |
| 8 | Hume-Bischof House | | April 30, 1979 (#79000997) | July 28, 1989 | E of Louisville at 18701 Shelbyville Rd. | Louisville | |
| 9 | Jacob Reel House | | August 22, 1983 (#83002726) | July 5, 1990 | Off I-64 | Jeffersontown | |
| 10 | Seebolt-Wilhoite-Pendergrass House | | July 12, 1983 (#83002730) | July 5, 1990 | 6010 Fern Valley Rd. | Louisville | |

== See also ==
- National Register of Historic Places listings in Kentucky
- List of National Historic Landmarks in Kentucky
- List of attractions and events in the Louisville metropolitan area
