= Eastwood School (Kentucky) =

Eastwood School is a former Rosenwald School for African Americans in the Eastwood, Kentucky neighborhood of Louisville. It is now a private residence. It is listed on the National Register of Historic Places. It is at 610 Gilliland Road.

Completed in 1923 it was used until 1937. The former school building is next to Beckley Station Park.

== See also ==
- National Register of Historic Places listings in Jefferson County, Kentucky
