= St. Therese of Lisieux Church (Louisville, Kentucky) =

Historic church in Kentucky, United States

- St. Therese Roman Catholic Church, School, and Rectory
- U.S. National Register of Historic Places
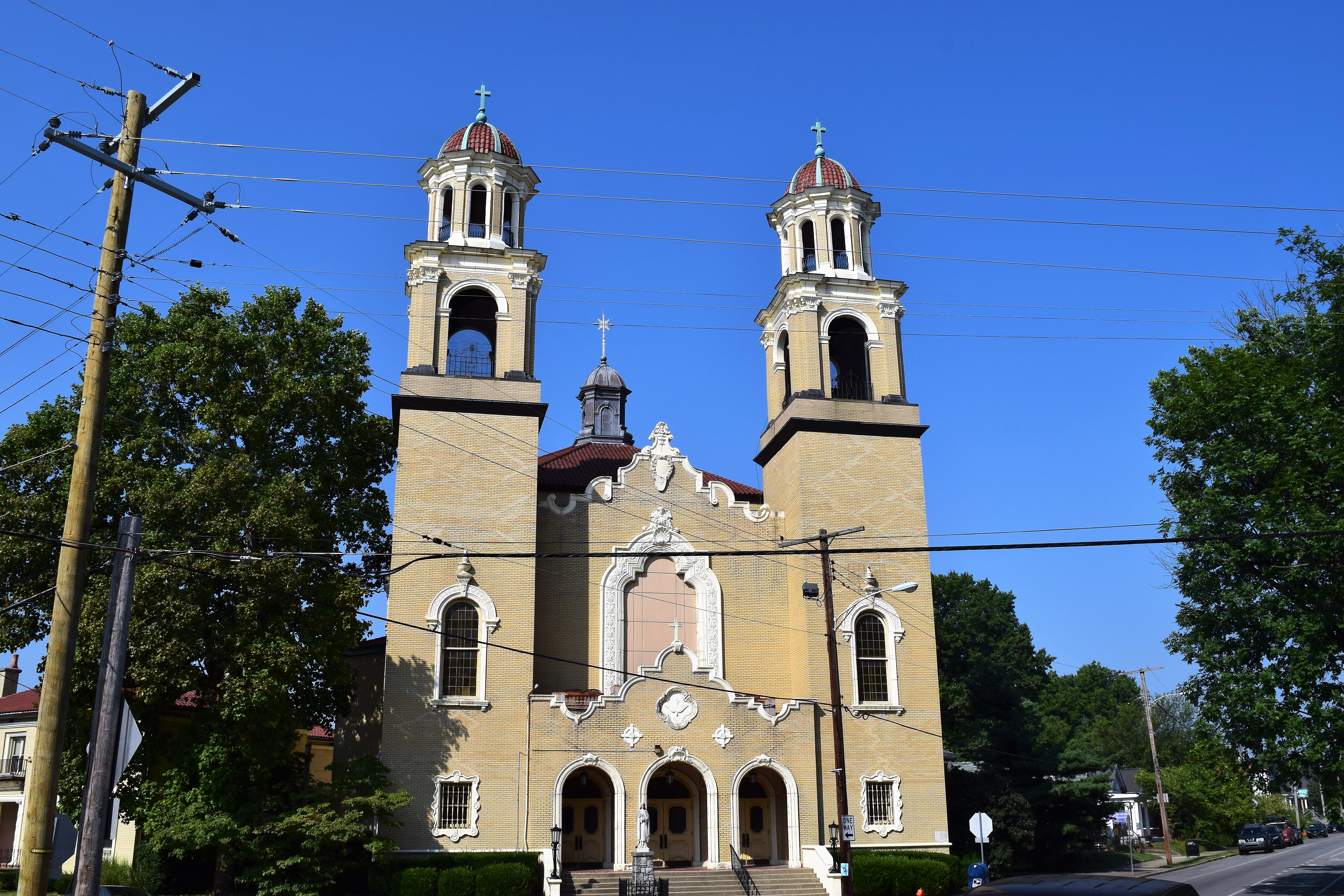

- Location within Kentucky Location within the United States
- Location: 1010 Schiller Ave., Louisville, Kentucky
- Coordinates: 38°14′8″N 85°43′56″W
- Area: less than one acre
- Built: 1906–08
- Architect: Fred T. Erhart
- Architectural style: Spanish Baroque
- NRHP reference No.: 75000776
- Added to NRHP: July 28, 1975

St. Therese of Lisieux Church is a historic Catholic church in Germantown, Louisville, Kentucky. It belongs to the Roman Catholic Archdiocese of Louisville. The church, along with the associated school and rectory, was added to the National Register of Historic Places in 1975. The Archdiocese closed the St. Therese of Lisieux parish as of August 31, 2025, citing significant decline in the Catholic population and parish registration. The area served is now consolidated with St. Elizabeth of Hungary Roman Catholic Church in Schnitzelburg, Louisville.

The historic listing includes the St. Therese School, built in 1906–08, which is a plain brick building that is the oldest building of the complex.
