= James Russell Lowell Elementary School (Louisville, Kentucky) =

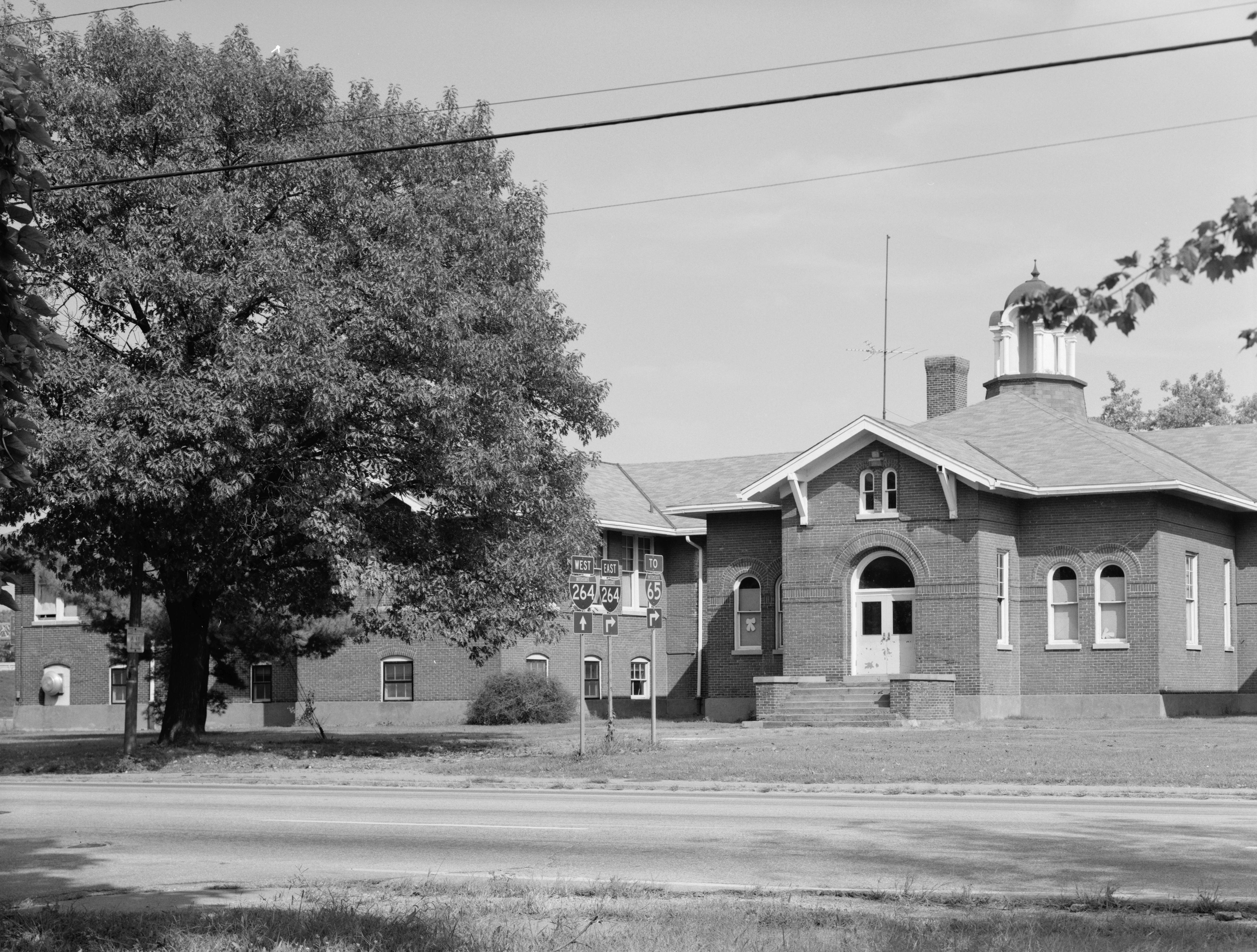

Location
- 4501 Crittenden Drive; Louisville, Kentucky; United States
- Coordinates: 38.188°N 85.751°W

Information
- Type: Public Primary
- School district: Jefferson County Public Schools
- Campus: Urban
- Color(s)
- Mascot: Lion

James Russell Lowell Elementary School was located at 4501 Crittenden Drive in the Highland Park neighborhood of Louisville, Kentucky. Construction began in 1916 on the original portion of the building that was known as Highland Park School and had the only remaining bell tower on a Public School in Louisville, Kentucky. Subsequent construction began in 1931 and the school became known as Lowell. The school was later demolished in 1993.

The school was listed on the National Register of Historic Places listings in Jefferson County, Kentucky on September 6, 1983.

== Credits ==
Library of Congress, Prints & Photographs Division, KY,56-LOUVI,72-3
