= Hikes-Hunsinger House =

- U.S. National Register of Historic Places
- Location within Kentucky Location within the United States
- Location: 2834 Hikes Lane, Louisville, Kentucky
- Coordinates: 38°12′27″N 85°38′48″W
- Area: 1 acre (0.40 ha)
- Built: 1823
- Architectural style: Federal
- NRHP reference No.: 75000769
- Added to NRHP: October 10, 1975

The Hikes-Hunsinger House is a historic residence in Louisville, Kentucky, United States. Although it was built in the 1820s as a farmhouse, it is now surrounded by the city, but it retains much of its original architecture, and it has been named a historic site.

== Architecture ==
Built in 1823, the house is a Federal structure, built of brick on a stone foundation and two stories tall. The facade is divided into five bays and features a double entryway with a fanlight but no sidelights. The house may have been built with a porch or stoop, but whatever was present at the time of construction has since disappeared; the entrance is surrounded by a newer porch of artificial stone constructed before 1924. An ell is attached to the house's northwest-facing rear section. Among the premier components of the interior is the main stairway, which dominates the hallway between the first and second floors. The floor plan includes a parlor, a living room, a kitchen, and a dining room on the first floor, while the large majority of the second floor is divided among multiple bedrooms.

== History ==
George Hikes Jr., a member of one of the leading families of early Louisville, constructed the present house and several others in the area. For over a century and a half, the house was owned by members of the Hikes family, who for many years continued to operate the farm, mill, and distillery that their ancestor had established along with the house. According to oral traditions preserved among the Hikes family, the property has been occupied by ghosts and by Union Army soldiers heading toward Perryville, and some of the details on an associated smokehouse were placed in order to demonstrate the owners' devotion to the ideals of Southern hospitality.

== Preservation ==
No longer is the Hikes House located amid farming country as in its early days. Part of the house's long lane is now the busy Hikes Lane, suburbia now encompasses the house on all sides, and much of the original farm is now occupied by subdivisions and a school. Nevertheless, the house retains much of its original architecture, due in part to consistent maintenance throughout its history. In recognition of its historically significant architecture, the Hikes-Hunsinger House was listed on the National Register of Historic Places in late 1975. It is one of more than four hundred different buildings and historic districts in the city of Louisville with this distinction.

== See also ==
- National Register of Historic Places listings in Jefferson County, Kentucky
