= Wyandotte, Louisville =

Area of Louisville, Kentucky, United States

Coordinates: 38°11′41″N 85°46′30″W

Wyandotte (formerly Oakdale), is a neighborhood on the southside of Louisville, Kentucky, United States. Its modern boundaries are Longfield Avenue to the north, Taylor Boulevard to the west, I-264 to the south, and Southern Parkway to the east. The opening of Iroquois Park in the early 1890s created a huge demand for suburban homes south of Louisville. The Coleman-Bush company had begun selling lots in a subdivision called Oakdale in late 1890. Oakdale was one of many middle-class communities created at this time, facilitated by the southward extension of streetcar lines.

Oakdale incorporated in 1904, and annexed nearby Churchill Downs as well as parts of other nearby neighborhoods. In 1916 however, Oakdale, along with other nearby cities such as Highland Park, was annexed by Louisville. Though the communities fought this, it was ultimately dismissed in federal court in 1921, and Oakdale became a part of Louisville in 1922.

Wyandotte Park, named after the Wyandotte tribe, was opened in 1935 in western Oakdale. This would eventually lead to the entire neighborhood being officially renamed Wyandotte in the 1970s, though many residents still call it Oakdale.
