= Theodore Brown House =

Historic house in Kentucky, United States

- U.S. National Register of Historic Places
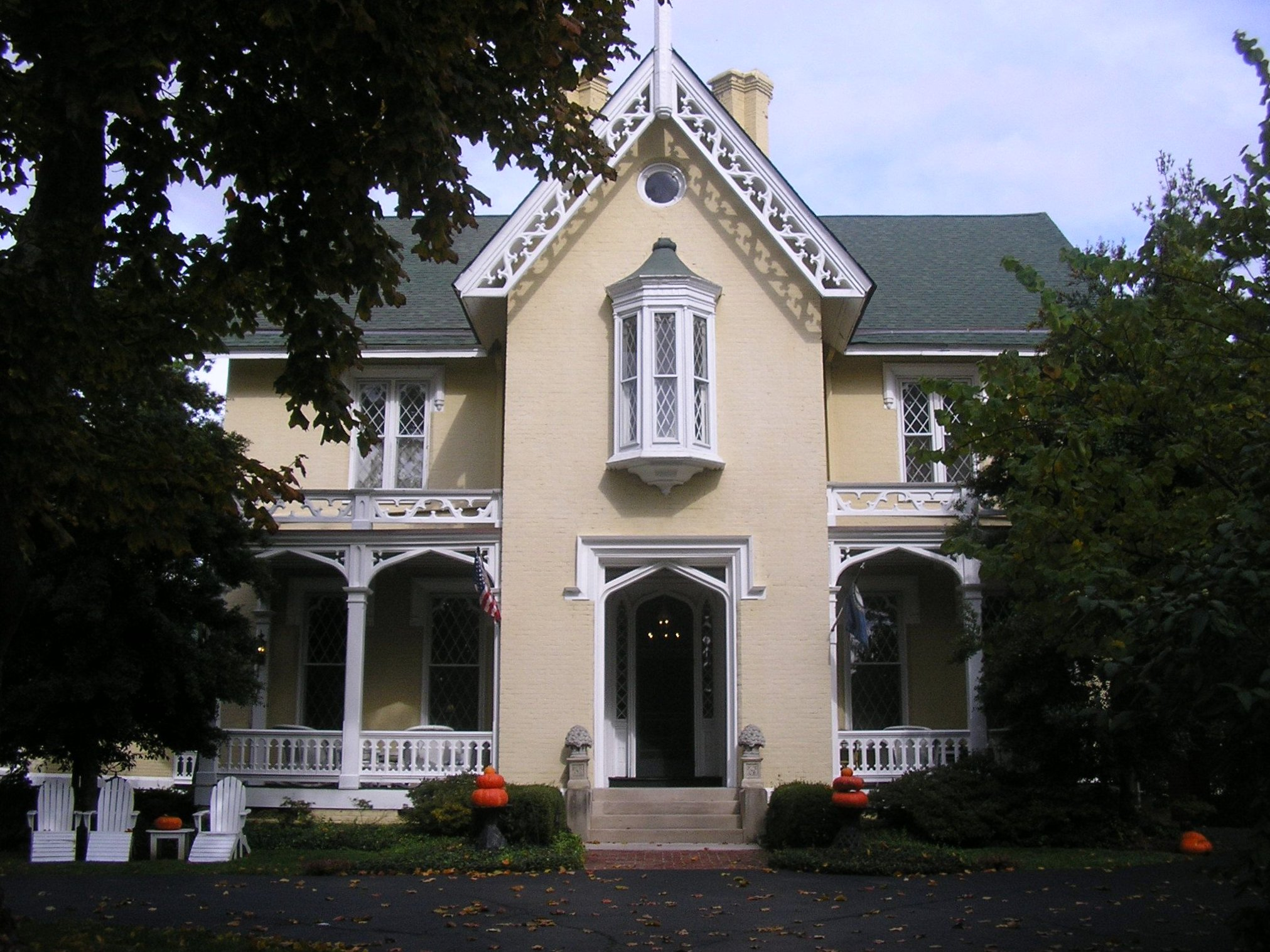
- Coordinates: 38.24296°N 85.63502°W
- Architectural style: Gothic Revival
- NRHP reference No.: 83002642
- Added to NRHP: 1983

The Theodore Brown House is a historic building in St. Matthews, Kentucky, a part of the Louisville metropolitan area.

It was built in the 1850s and added to the National Register of Historic Places in 1983.

Originally named Woodview, the house was built by Theodore Brown (1821–1899), a prominent farmer. The property includes a main house and carriage house. The mansion was built in the Gothic Revival style using bricks that were made on the property. In 1920, the property was sold and renamed Woodhaven by the Monohan family, who owned it until the 1970s. When the surrounding land was developed, the house was nearly razed by developers. The house was saved from destruction and restored. Original features are still intact, including diamond windowpanes and 14-foot arched gothic doors. The main house and carriage house are now part of a bed and breakfast, The Inn at Woodhaven, that opened in 1993.

== See also ==
- National Register of Historic Places listings in Jefferson County, Kentucky
