= Bon Air, Louisville =

Neighborhood in Louisville, Kentucky

Coordinates: 38°12′33″N 85°39′27″W

Bon Air is a neighborhood in eastern Louisville, Kentucky, United States. Its boundaries are I-264 to the north, Bardstown Road to the west, Furman Boulevard to the east, and subdivisions to the south. The earliest residential development was the Wellingmoor subdivision in 1939, laid out by Ralph Drake. Growth picked up after World War II, but was broken up somewhat by the construction of the Watterson Expressway in the late 1940s.

== Education ==
Bon Air has a lending library, a branch of the Louisville Free Public Library.
