= Brownsboro-Zorn, Louisville =

Neighborhood in Louisville, Kentucky

Coordinates: 38°16′01″N 85°41′27″W

Brownsboro-Zorn is a neighborhood in northeast Louisville, Kentucky, United States. Its boundaries are Brownsboro Road to the south, Birchwood Avenue to the west, Mellwood Avenue to the north, and Mockingbird Valley to the east. Residential development began in 1911 between Birchwood and Zorn Avenue, a wide street which bisects the neighborhood. The core of the neighborhood is residential, but there is substantial commerce along Brownsboro Road. The Veterans Affairs Medical Center is located along Zorn.

Sarah Knox Taylor, the daughter of former president Zachary Taylor, married Jefferson Davis in a house that stood at the corner of Brownsboro and Zorn in 1835.

== Demographics ==
As of 2000, the population of Brownsboro-Zorn was 2,232, of which 88.9% is white, 9.7% is black, 1.2% is listed as other, and 0.3% is Hispanic. College graduates are 51.5% of the population, people w/o a high school degree are 9.0%. Females outnumber males 53.6% to 46.4%.
