= South Louisville Reformed Church =

Historic church in Kentucky, United States

- U.S. National Register of Historic Places
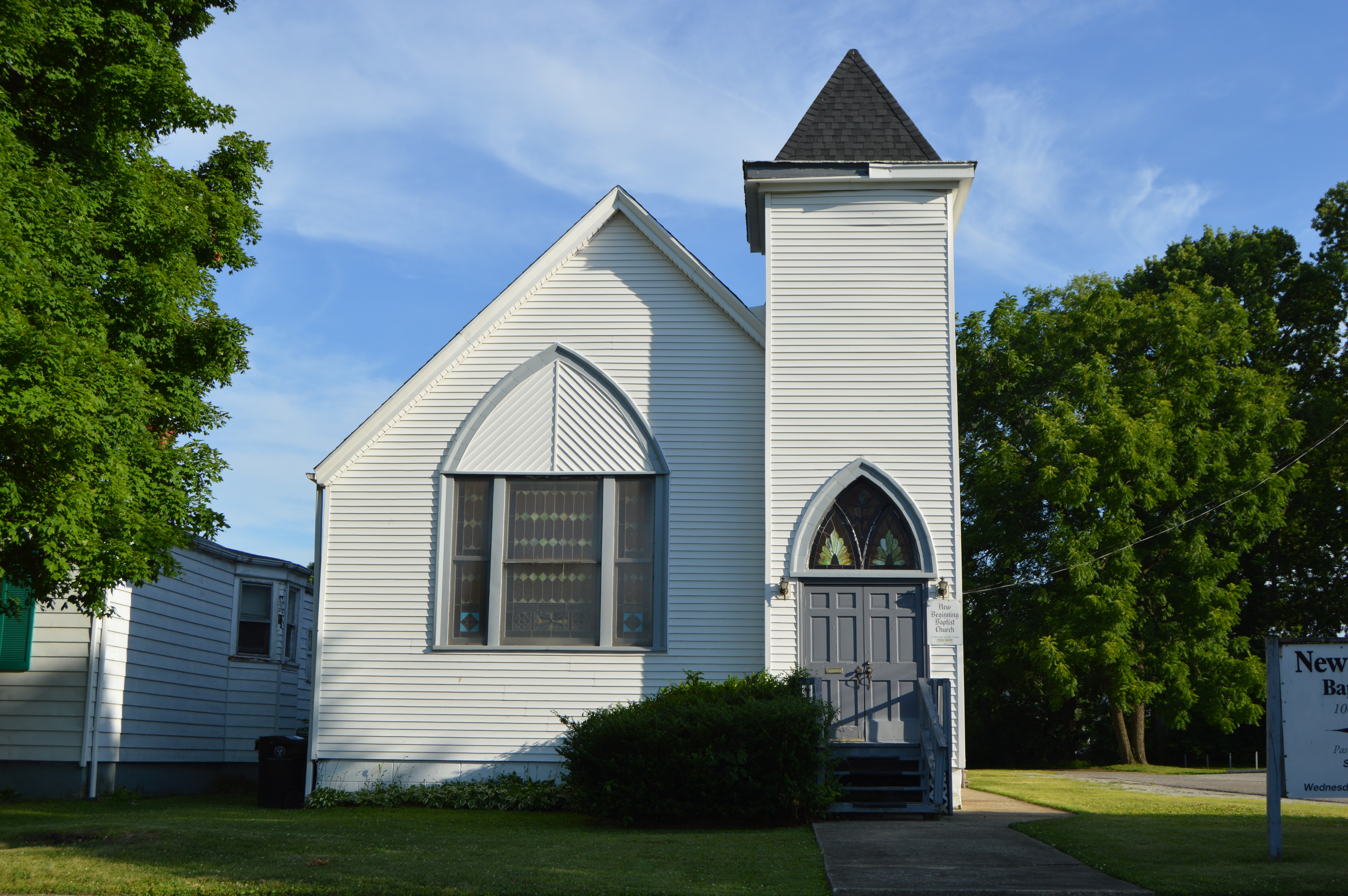
- Front of the church

- Location within Kentucky Location within the United States
- Location: 1060 Lynnhurst Ave., Louisville, Kentucky
- Coordinates: 38°10′41″N 85°46′54″W
- Area: less than one acre
- Built: 1908
- Architectural style: Late Gothic Revival
- MPS: South Louisville MRA
- NRHP reference No.: 83002735
- Added to NRHP: September 6, 1983

South Louisville Reformed Church is a historic church at 1060 Lynnhurst Avenue in Louisville, Kentucky. It was built in 1908 and added to the National Register of Historic Places in 1983.

It is a frame Gothic Revival style church.

In 1908 it was built as the South Louisville Reformed Church; it was renamed to Lynnhurst Reformed Church in c.1925 after the area was annexed by Louisville and the street it was on was renamed to Lynnhurst, from Sycamore.
