= Ridgeway (Louisville, Kentucky) =

- U.S. National Register of Historic Places
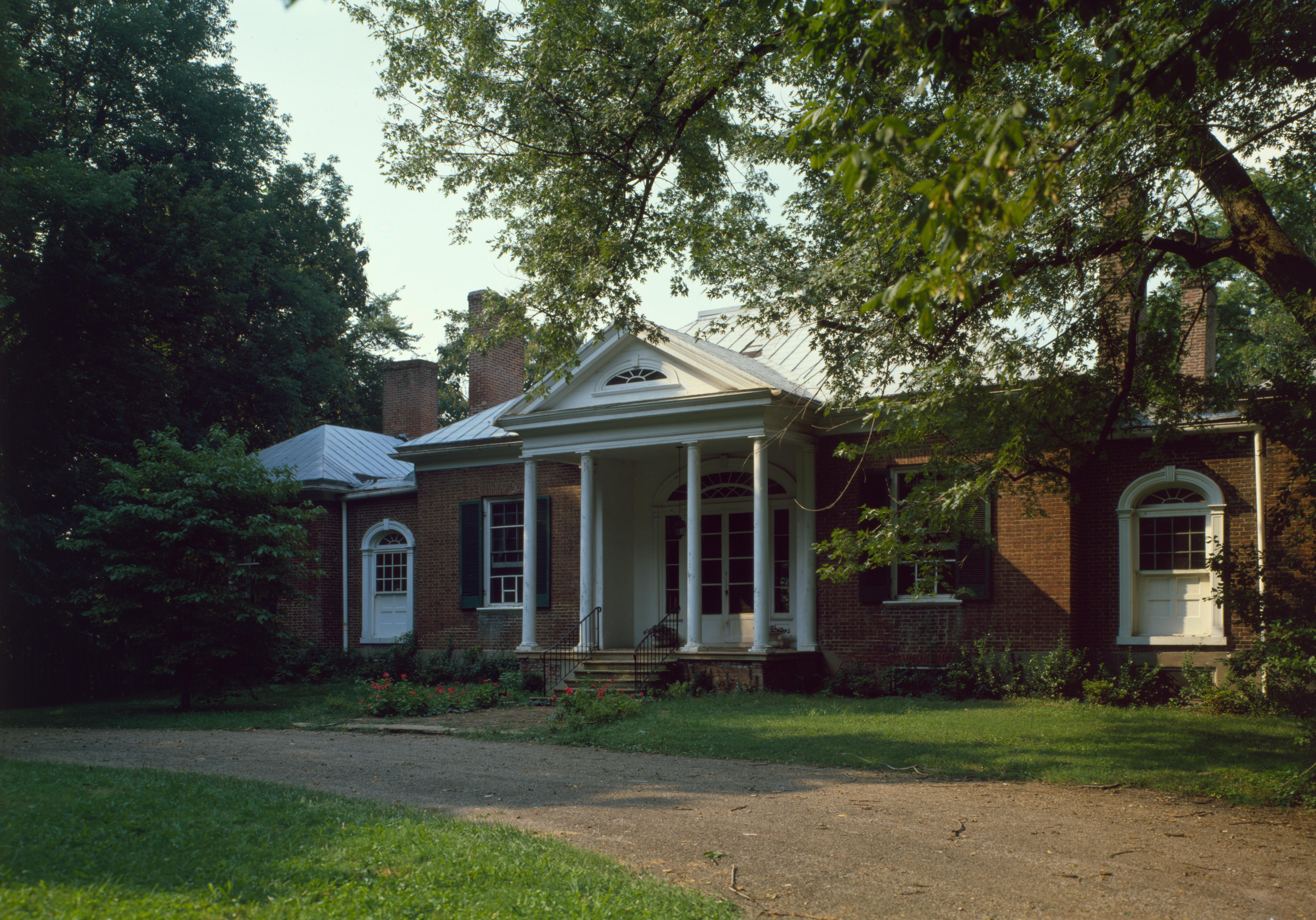

- Location within Kentucky Location within the United States
- Location: 4095 Massie Ave., Louisville, Kentucky
- Coordinates: 38°15′50″N 85°38′53″W
- Area: 9.9 acres (4.0 ha)
- Built: 1805
- Architectural style: Federal
- NRHP reference No.: 73000810
- Added to NRHP: April 11, 1973

Ridgeway is a Federal-style house built in 1805 in Louisville, Kentucky near St. Matthews, Kentucky. It is located at 4095 Massie Avenue. It was listed on the National Register of Historic Places in 1973.

It is a one-story brick house with brick laid in Flemish bond. Its design includes "three principal masses or pavilions" each "surmounted by a hipped roof. It has a tetrastyle Doric portico which was admired by architectural critic Rexford Newcomb in his book Architecture In Old Kentucky.

Landscape architect Arthur W. Cowell designed gardens for Ridgeway in the 1920s.
