= Cooper Memorial Church =

Historic church in Kentucky, United States

- U.S. National Register of Historic Places
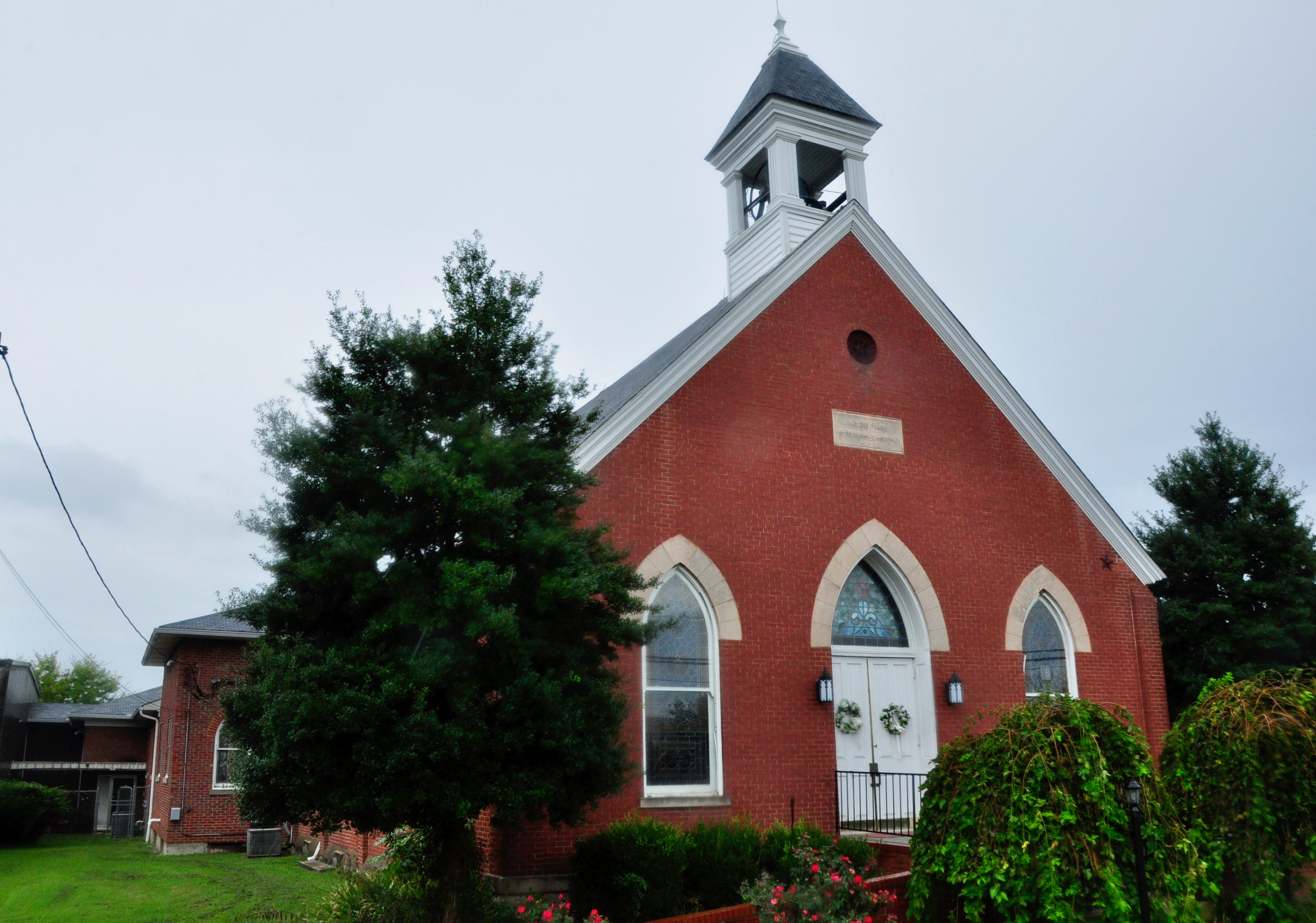

- Location within Kentucky Location within the United States
- Location: 9900 Cooper Church Drive, Okolona, Louisville, Kentucky
- Coordinates: 38°6′23″N 85°40′28″W
- Built: 1896
- Architectural style: Gothic
- MPS: Jefferson County MRA
- NRHP reference No.: 80001639
- Added to NRHP: December 5, 1980

Cooper Memorial Church (also known as Cooper Memorial United Methodist Church) is a historic church at 9900 Cooper Church Drive in Okolona, Louisville, Kentucky, United States. It was built in 1896 and added to the National Register of Historic Places in 1980.

It is built of red brick in a simple Gothic Revival style. It is the third church building of the congregation, which was organized in about 1812.
