= Von Allmen Dairy Farm House =

- U.S. National Register of Historic Places
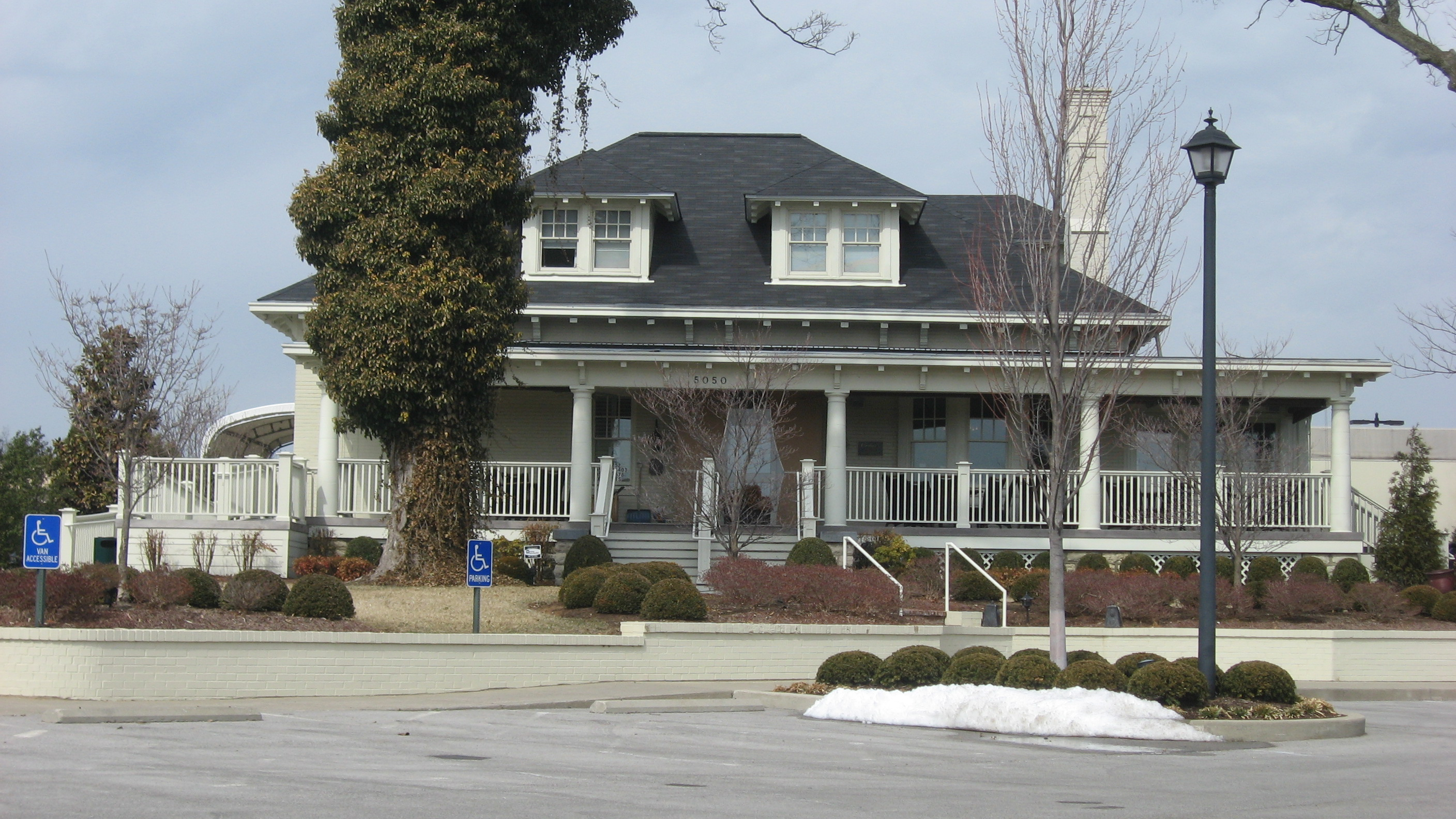
- Front with parking

- Location within Kentucky Location within the United States
- Nearest city: Louisville, Kentucky
- Coordinates: 38°18′47″N 85°34′28″W
- Built: 1919
- Architectural style: Colonial Revival
- NRHP reference No.: 07001251
- Added to NRHP: December 11, 2007

The Von Allmen Dairy Farm House in Louisville, Kentucky, USA, was placed on the National Register of Historic Places on December 11, 2007. Built in 1912, it was purchased in 1919 by Emil Von Allmen, president of the Gray-Von Allmen Sanitary Milk Company. It was described as "the last vestige of a well-known dairy farm".

The house is of Bungalow/Craftsman style, 1½ stories high, with Neo-classical detailing.

Eventually, the consolidation of dairy farming caused the farm to stop producing. Of the original 226 acres (0.91 km^{2}), only 4 acres (16,000 m^{2}) remain of the property, with the rest consumed by Louisville sprawl.

Dean Corbett, chef of the Equus restaurant in St. Matthews, Kentucky, planned to restore the building into a new upscale restaurant called "Corbett's: An American Place". On December 13, 2007, it had a "soft opening" with a hard opening on December 15, 2007.
