= Middletown United Methodist Church =

Historic church in Kentucky, United States

- U.S. National Register of Historic Places
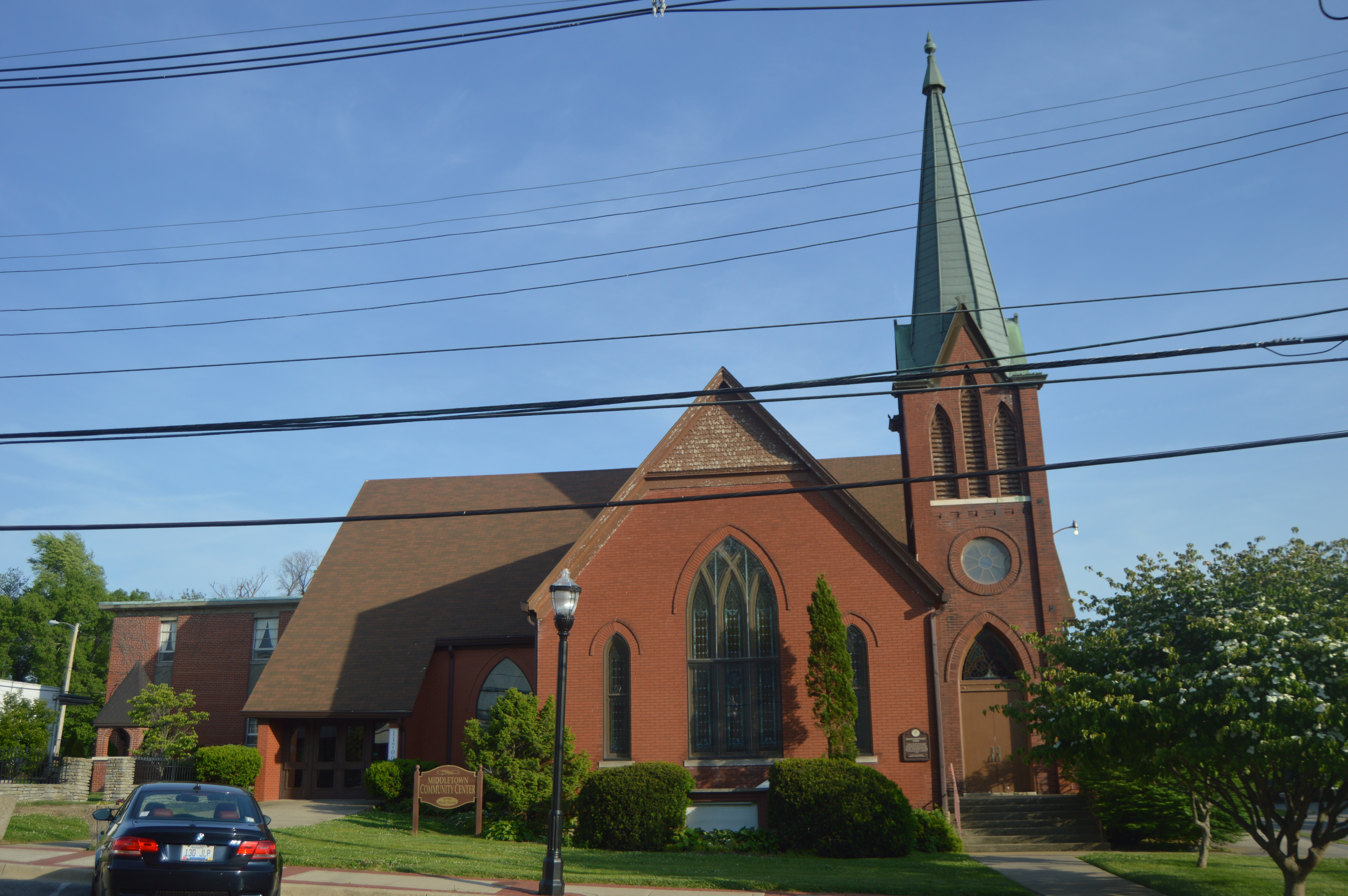
- Front of the former church, in 2014

- Location within Kentucky Location within the United States
- Location: Madison and Main Sts., Middletown, Kentucky
- Coordinates: 38°14′42″N 85°32′21″W
- Built: 1899
- Architect: Wood, William, B.
- Architectural style: Gothic
- MPS: Jefferson County MRA
- NRHP reference No.: 80001638
- Added to NRHP: December 5, 1980

The Middletown United Methodist Church is a historic church at Madison and Main Streets in Middletown, Kentucky. It was added to the National Register of Historic Places in 1980.

The church was established in 1800. The second building was built in 1899 by William Benjamin Wood, a local builder. It is a brick structure on a stone foundation.

The parish is now located in a newer building on Old Shelbyville Road.

A sign on the lawn in 2014 identified the building as the Middletown Community Center (per photo).
