= Taylor-Berry, Louisville =

Neighborhood in Louisville, Kentucky

Coordinates: 38°12′27″N 85°46′58″W

Taylor-Berry is a neighborhood in Louisville, Kentucky, United States.

Its boundaries are Taylor Boulevard to the east, Berry Boulevard to the south, Seventh Street Road to the west, and Algonquin Parkway to the north.
