= Parkwood, Louisville =

Neighborhood in Louisville, Kentucky

Coordinates: 38°09′18″N 85°48′05″W

Parkwood is a neighborhood of Louisville, Kentucky near Iroquois Park. It is located along KY-1931 (Manslick Road north of the intersection with Palatka, St. Andrews Church Road to its south) south of Gagel Avenue which forms its border with Cloverleaf.
