= Rockcreek-Lexington Road, Louisville =

Neighborhood in Louisville, Kentucky

Coordinates: 38°14′39″N 85°40′06″W

Rockcreek-Lexington Road is an irregular-shaped neighborhood in Louisville, Kentucky, United States. Its boundaries are Seneca Park and Briar Hill Road to the west, Cannons Lane to the east, Interstate 64 to the south, and Lexington Road to the north. Also included are "areas immediately adjoining Shelbyville Rd. from Cannons Ln. to Fairfax Ave. and those along Nanz Ave. from Cannons Ln. to Macon Ave."
