= Klondike, Louisville =

Neighborhood in Louisville, Kentucky

Coordinates: 38°12′19″N 85°38′06″W

Klondike is a neighborhood in eastern Louisville, Kentucky, United States. Due to being on the edge of the old city limits, its boundaries are irregular, it is south of Hikes Lane and west of Breckenridge Lane. Development began after World War II, with developers Edward Butler and Chester Cooper purchasing and subdividing 45 acres (180,000 m^{2}) of the Graff farm and part of the Hikes family's Midlane farm.

Klondike is primarily residential and includes Klondike Park. Local legend is that the park was named after Frank Bumann, a prospector from the Yukon who opened the park.
