= Peterson Avenue Hill =

- U.S. National Register of Historic Places
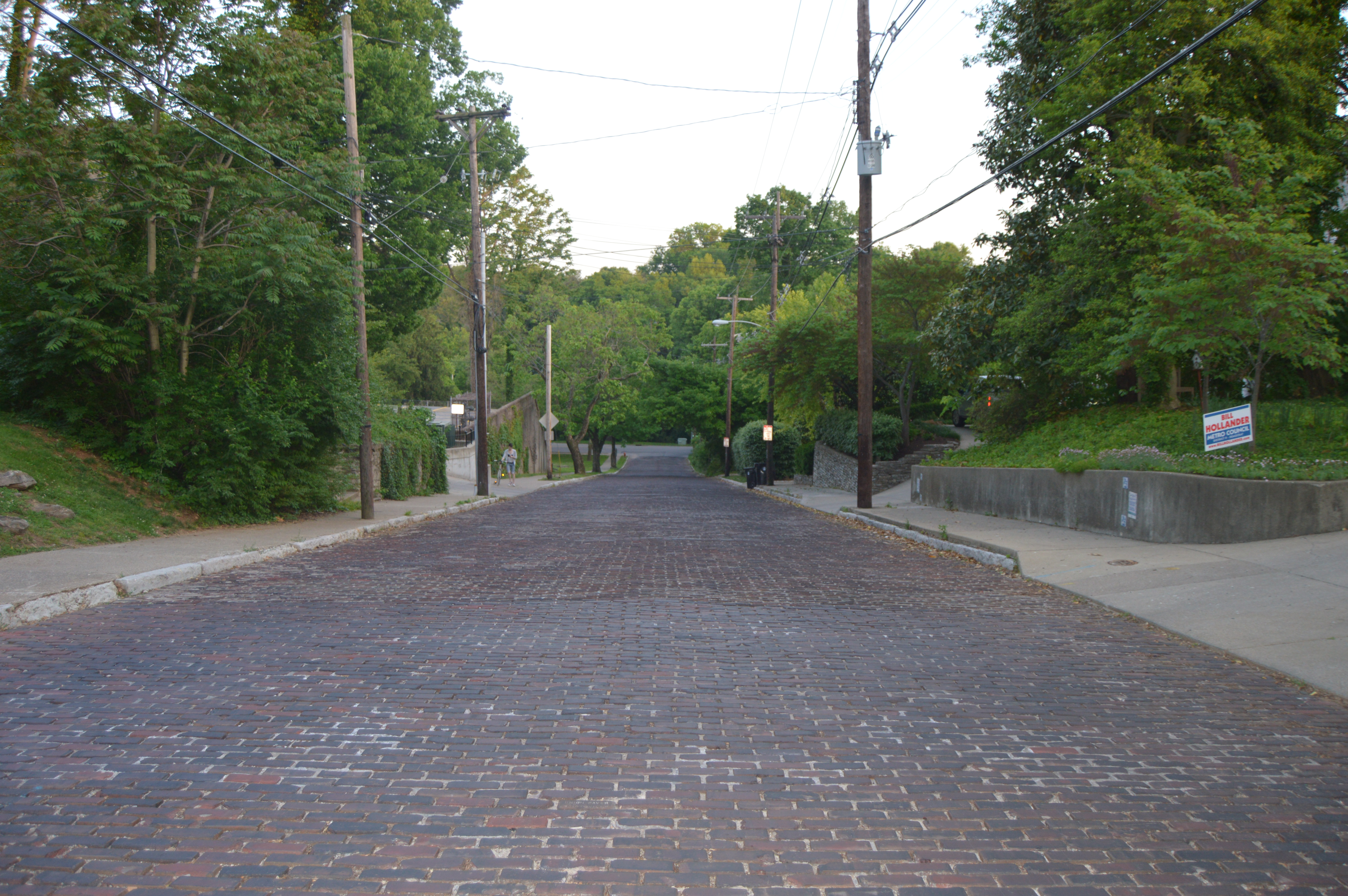
- Looking down from the top of the hill

- Location within Kentucky Location within the United States
- Location: Louisville, Kentucky
- Coordinates: 38°14′58″N 85°41′49″W
- Built: 1902
- NRHP reference No.: 80001614
- Added to NRHP: 1980

Peterson Avenue Hill is one of the few remaining brick streets in Louisville, Kentucky. It is Louisville's most infamous brick street or alley.

== Description ==
The brick portion of the street covers a steep hill with a mean slope of approximately 15 degrees. The brick portion originally extended for approximately 740 feet but asphalt paving has already been applied to about 137 feet at the top of the hill, leaving an area, of brick paving 603 feet by 30 feet wide.

The hill is paved with vitrified bricks which are laid at angles in a sand base. The angling is not found in any other remaining brick alley street in the city. This method helps to create traction on the surface in wet weather. The hill is edged by a stone curb.

== History ==
Peterson Avenue was created when the Peterson-Dumesnil House's estate was carved up in the late 19th century and Crescent Hill became a subdivided residential neighborhood. The Peterson-Dumesnil estate was carved into property for Barrett Middle School and four residences, all on the east side of the hill. In 1902, Louisville passed an ordinance calling for the avenue to be paved. The street takes its name from Joseph Peterson, a wealthy tobacco merchant who built the Peterson-Dumesnil house in 1869 or 1870.

Bricks were a popular choice at the time, as Louisville had several brickyards and bricks were cheap and an improvement over previous paving surfaces such as clay, clay-sand, and gravel or macadam.

There is an oral tradition associating the hill with the early history of the automobile in Louisville. Car dealers would boast that their cars could pull Peterson Hill in high gear, and many cars were put to just such a test. The fire department also used Peterson Hill to test its new fire engines.

In June 1979, Peterson Avenue Hill was designated a local landmark.
