= Beechmont, Louisville =

Neighborhood in Louisville, Kentucky

Coordinates: 38.18170°N 85.76220°W

Beechmont is a neighborhood in the south end of Louisville, Kentucky. Its modern boundaries are I-264 to the north, Taylor Boulevard to the west, Southern Parkway and Southland Boulevard to the south, and Third Street, Allmond and Louisville Avenues to the east.

Iroquois Park is located to its southwest. The park, purchased by Louisville Mayor Charles Donald Jacob in 1889 and completed in 1893, was connected to the city by Southern Parkway (originally called Grand Boulevard), in a master plan designed by Frederick Law Olmsted. Much like Shawnee Park spurred development in the Shawnee neighborhood, Iroquois Park contributed to making Beechmont a desirable suburb as it was developed in the 1890s. The neighborhood was named for the beech trees in the area, as Beechmont was to be a pleasant escape from the crowded urban area of Louisville.

Due to its relative distance from Louisville, it was originally intended as a summer neighborhood for the wealthy, and was a part of the city of Highland Park - which incorporated in 1890. The dominant architectural style of early houses in the neighborhood is the Craftsman style. It was linked to Louisville by a streetcar line along 4th street in 1900, and the city was annexed by Louisville in 1922, after a 5-year court battle.

Beechmont escaped flooding during the Great Flood of 1937, and was a temporary disaster shelter. The neighborhood expanded slightly as new developments were built after World War II. These developments were often unpopular with the residents of Beechmont. The neighborhood suffered a decline in the 1960s, following the same pattern as all of the older neighborhoods.

As of 2000, Beechmont had a population of 8,021.
