= Pennsylvania Run Presbyterian Church =

Historic church in Kentucky, United States

- U.S. National Register of Historic Places
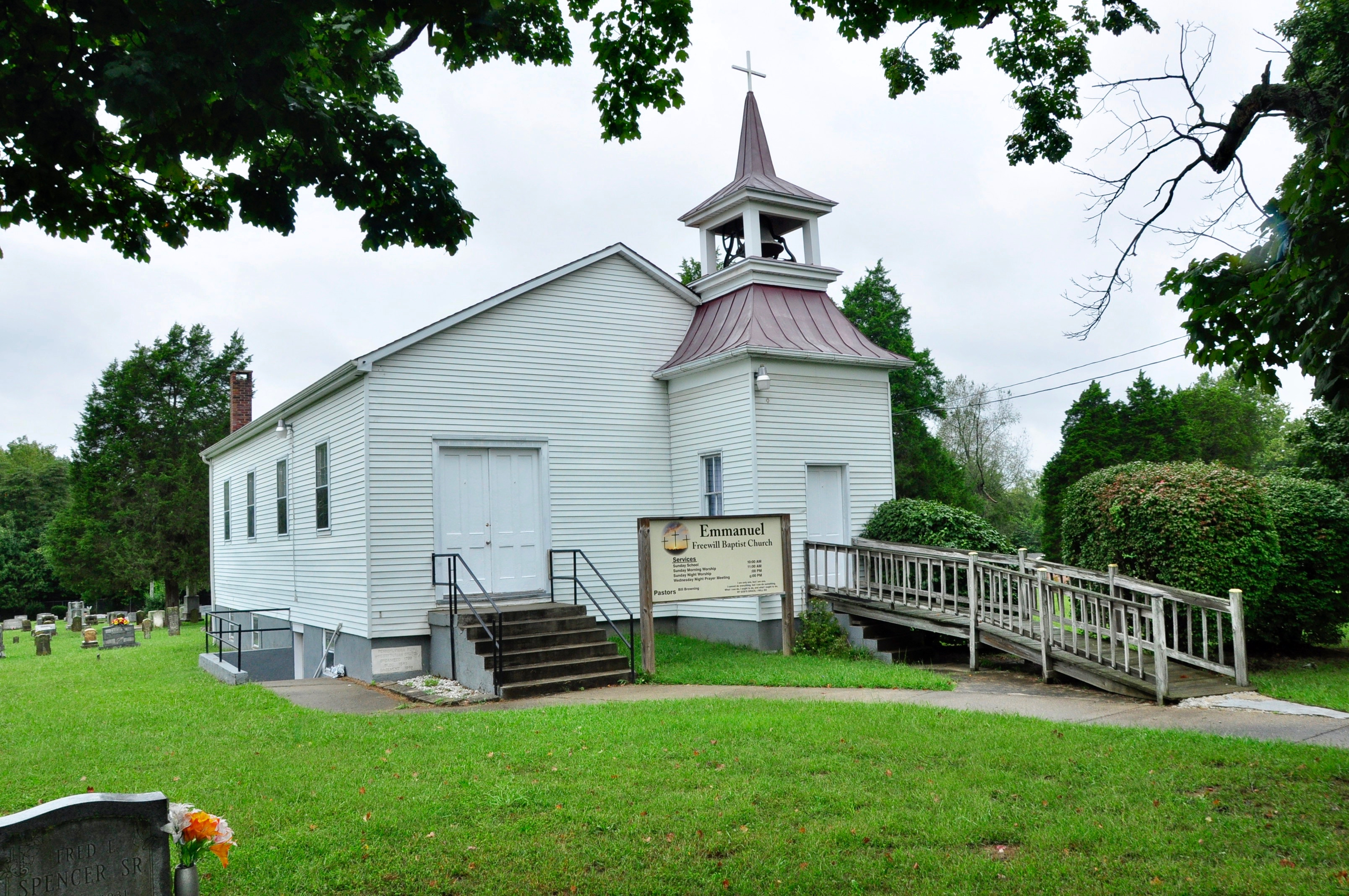

- Location within Kentucky Location within the United States
- Location: Vaughn's Mill Rd., near Okolona, Kentucky
- Coordinates: 38°07′36″N 85°37′46″W
- Area: 5.2 acres (2.1 ha)
- Built: 1840
- MPS: Jefferson County MRA
- NRHP reference No.: 83002720
- Added to NRHP: July 12, 1983

Pennsylvania Run Presbyterian Church is a historic church near Okolona, Kentucky. It was built in 1840 and added to the National Register of Historic Places in 1983. It was then named Smyrna Missionary Baptist Church.

The church was organized in 1799. A log building was replaced by its 1840 building, which is a one-room frame building with a gable roof. It has a one-story square tower with steeple and an open belfry.

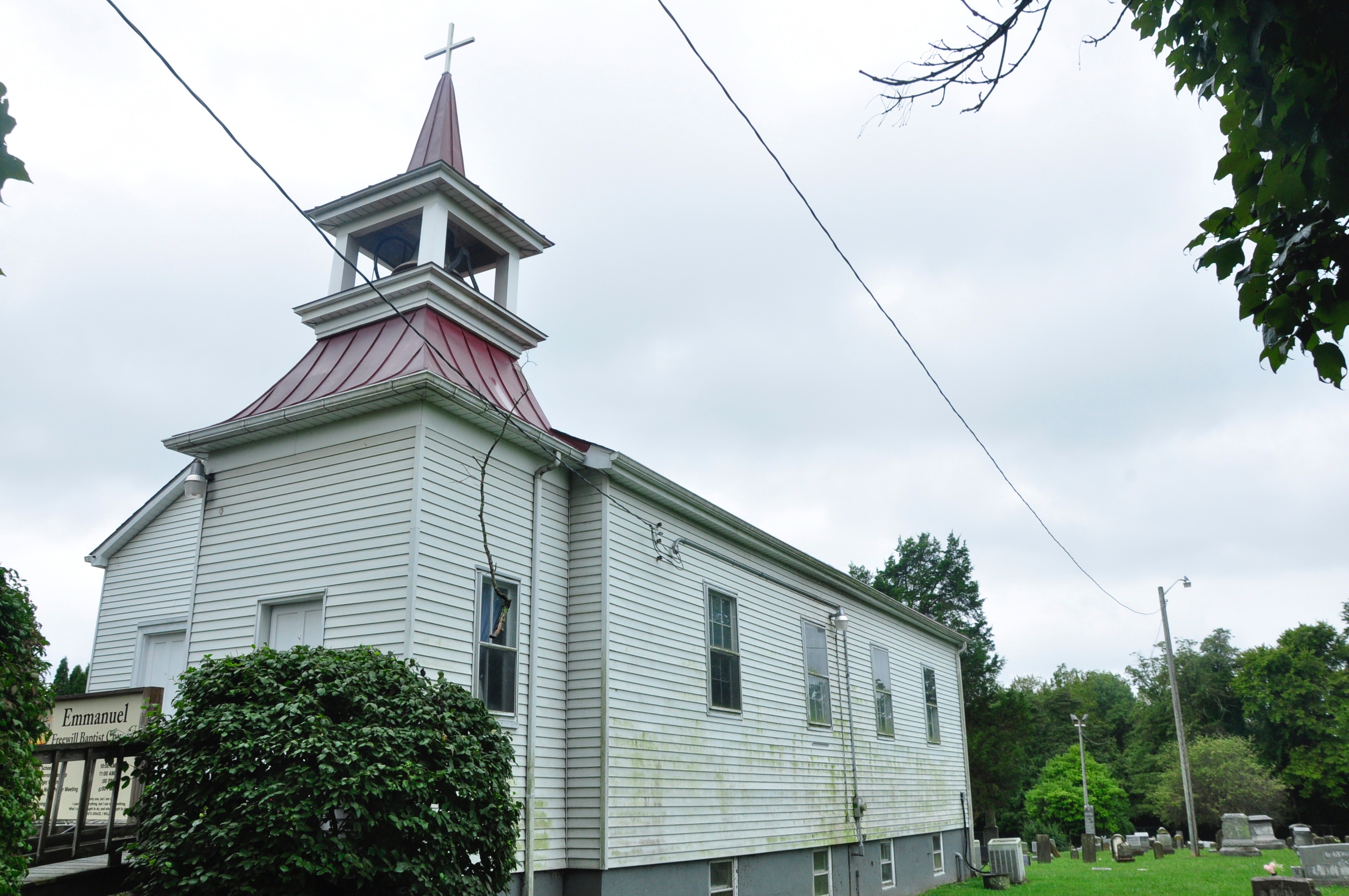

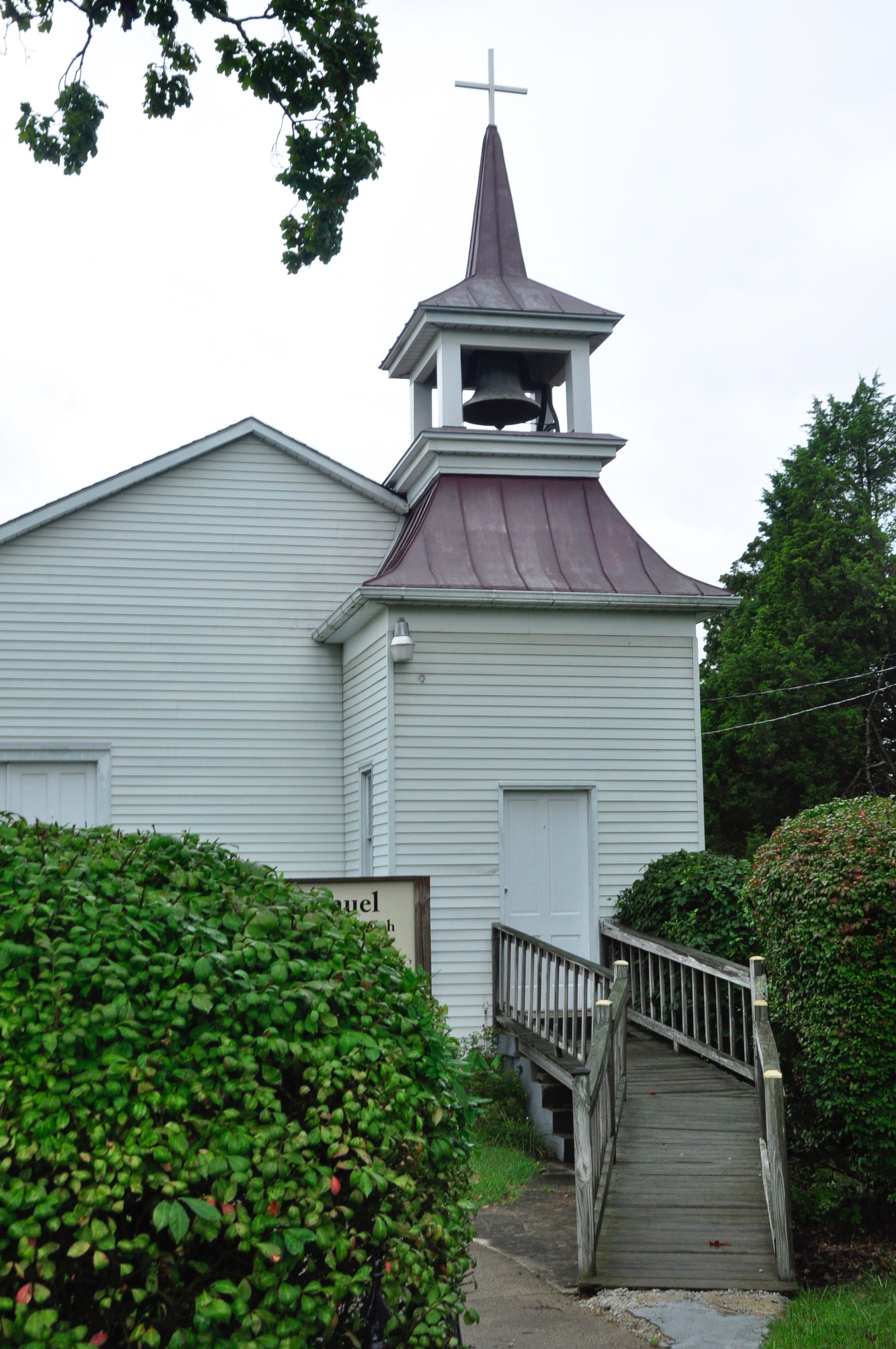

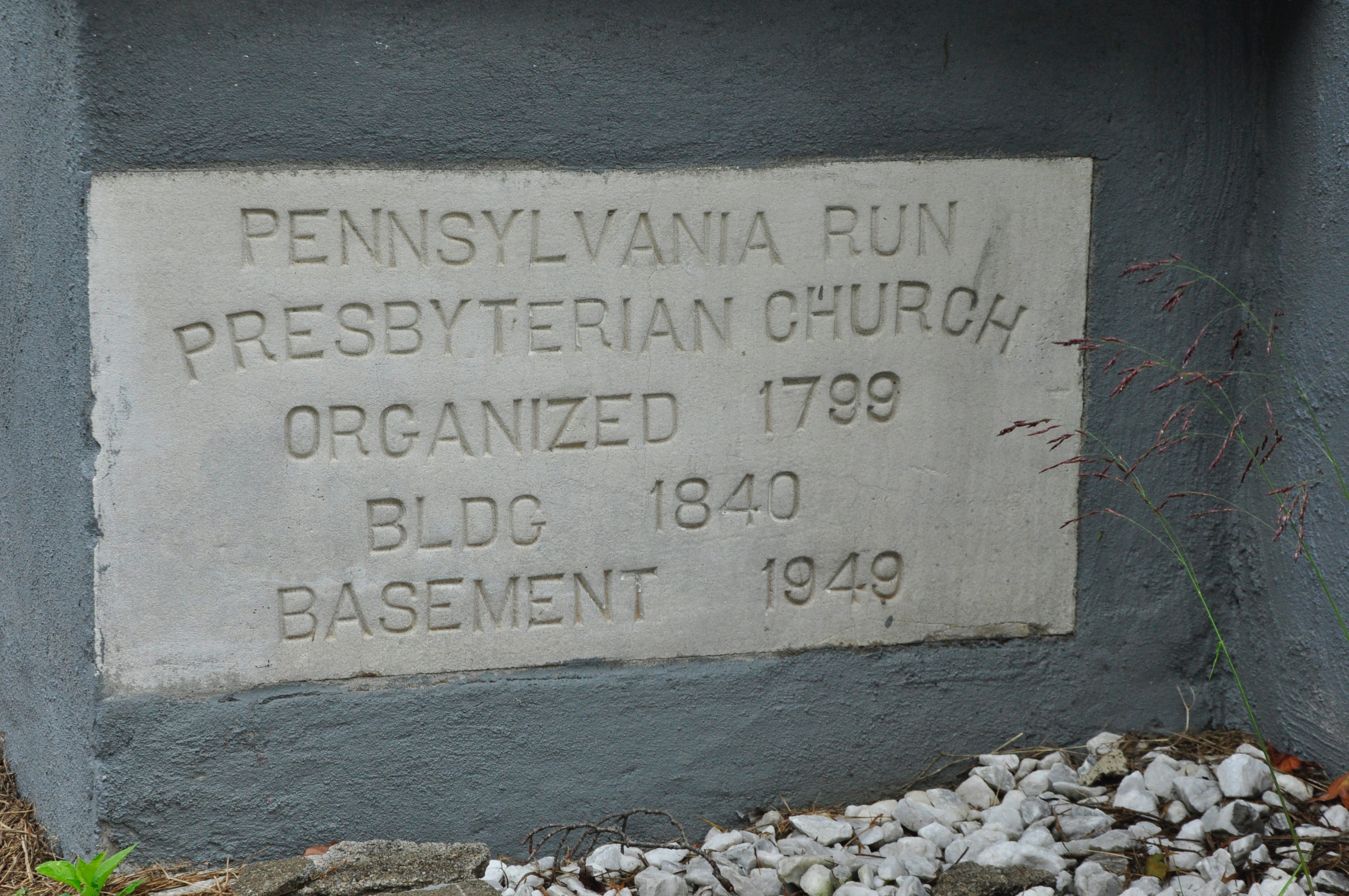
