= South Louisville =

Neighborhood in Louisville, Kentucky, US

Coordinates: 38°12′30″N 85°46′05″W

- Louisville neighborhood
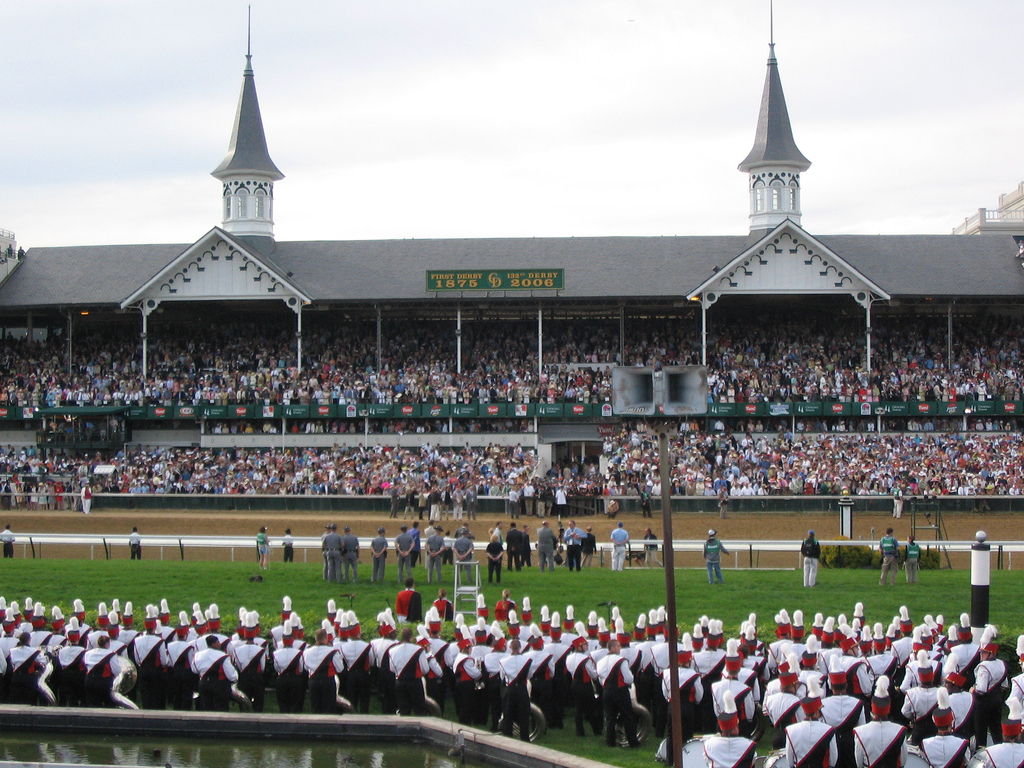
- Churchill Downs in South Louisville
- Interactive map of South Louisville
- Country: United States
- State: Kentucky
- City: Louisville
- Established: 1870
- Area code(s): 502

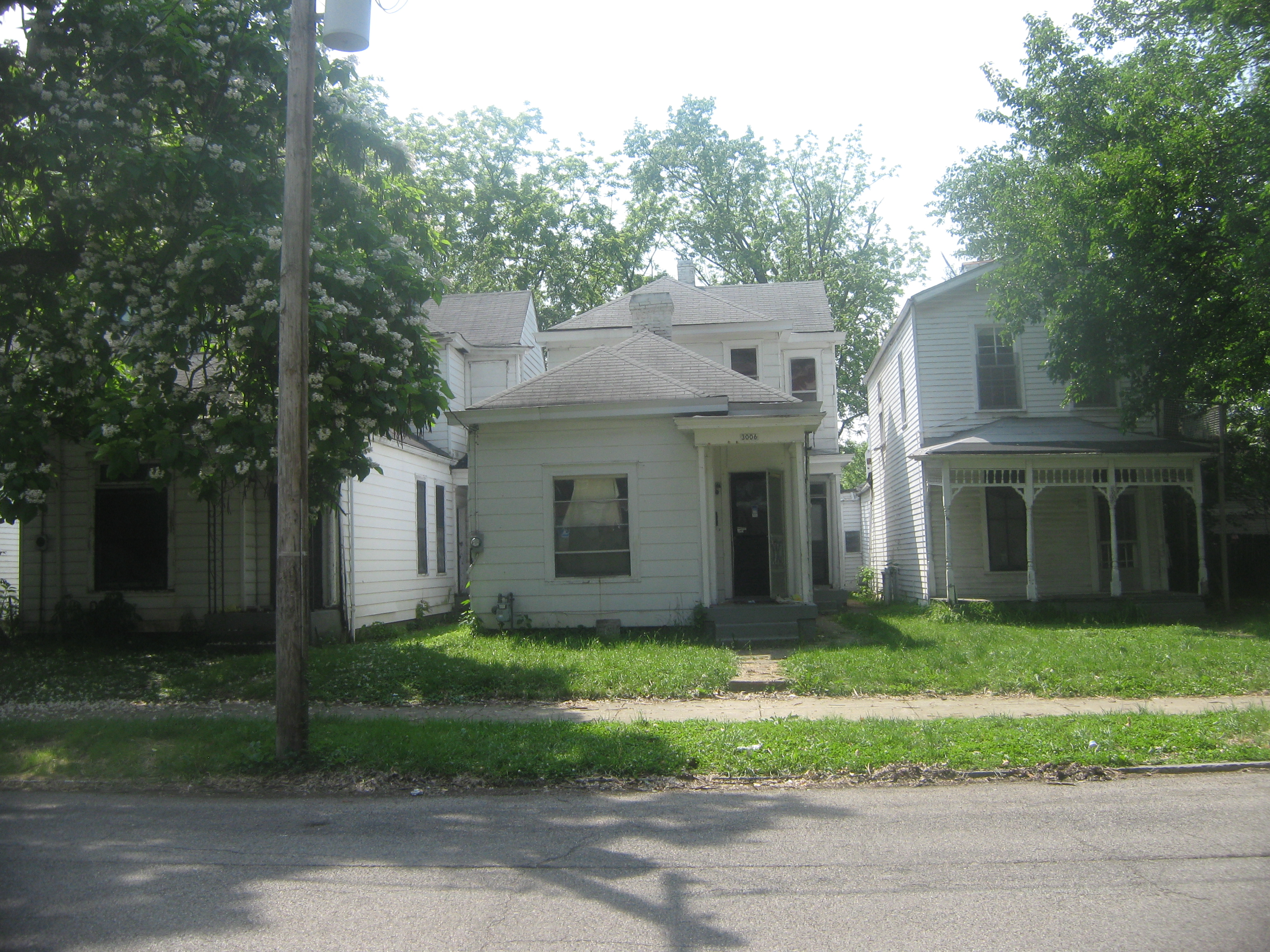
Late 1800s shotgun house on S. 5th St.

South Louisville is a neighborhood two miles south of downtown Louisville, Kentucky, US. ("South Louisville" or "South Side" is also used to describe the entire portion of Southern Louisville.) The area was incorporated as a city in 1886. The city of Louisville fought to annex the area and did so, after a three-year lawsuit, in 1898. As of 2000, the population of South Louisville was 4,688.

The neighborhood itself is bounded by Industry Road, the CSX railroad tracks, Central Avenue, Taylor Boulevard, Longfield Avenue, Compton Street, Thornberry Avenue, Colorado Avenue, Euclid Avenue, and Lincoln avenue. The world-famous Churchill Downs horse racing track and Kentucky Derby Museum are located in South Louisville.

The area was originally owned by the Churchill family and was developed as streetcar lines extended southward to the area in the 1870s. The population grew greatly in the 1890s as many factories, including the Kentucky Wagon Company, were constructed along several rail lines in the area. The large shops of the L&N Railroad were built in the early 1900s.

In 1937 there was a destructive flood. As factories in the area closed in the 1970s, the area greatly declined when middle-class residents moved away, leaving behind abandoned factories and low-income residents. South Louisville is increasingly becoming an immigrant-centered neighborhood, with large Hispanic and Arab populations. Since 2006, a Mosque and several Middle Eastern food stores have opened in the area.

However, South Louisville began to see new development as the University of Louisville expanded its campus southward, with a new football stadium completed in 1998, a baseball stadium completed in 2005, and a soccer stadium completed in 2014, all built on former brownfield sites. A shopping center was built in 2004. Several of the abandoned factory buildings are slated to be converted into condominiums.

Additionally, the smaller “Lucky Horseshoe” neighborhood primarily occupies the area of South Louisville below Central Avenue including all of Churchill Downs.
