= KYANG site =

- KYANG Site (15JF267)
- U.S. National Register of Historic Places
- Nearest city: Louisville, Kentucky
- Area: 1.2 acres (0.49 ha)
- NRHP reference No.: 72000539
- Added to NRHP: September 12, 1972

The KYANG Site, also known as the Kentucky Air National Guard site or 15JF267, is a prehistoric archaeological site located on the grounds of the Louisville Air National Guard Base in Louisville, Kentucky. The site was occupied from the Early Archaic period to the Late Woodland period. The site includes two zones, both of which contain extensive midden deposits. Burials were also conducted at the site, and human remains have been recovered from both zones. The site was discovered in 1972 during construction work at the base; formal excavations at the site began the following year.

Research by the University of Louisville concluded that KYANG was part of the "Old Clarksville Phase", a group of Middle Archaic sites straddling the Ohio River in the vicinity of the Falls of the Ohio, dated circa 6000-4400 BC, including a prehistoric component at the Old Clarksville site. It is also included in the later Lone Hill Phase, circa 4400–3200, a group of sites all located in Jefferson County. Extensive deposits of bone from the Middle Archaic period are present in KYANG's large midden, preserved by its highly alkaline soil, and their high degree of preservation facilitated a comprehensive study of local Middle Archaic bone-working toolmaking technology in 1992. Extensive burials at the site, together with the large midden, testify to its long period of use. A large mussel-shell layer atop the midden appears to indicate that the inhabitants used it as a processing spot for river mussels, while the site's bones appear to indicate that their diet was otherwise based on small mammals and deer. Conversely, no evidence of cold-weather occupation is present, suggesting that all occupations were seasonal.

The site was added to the National Register of Historic Places on September 12, 1972. The boundaries of the National Register listing were decreased in 1990.
