= German Evangelical Church of Christ Complex =

Historic church in Kentucky, United States

- U.S. National Register of Historic Places
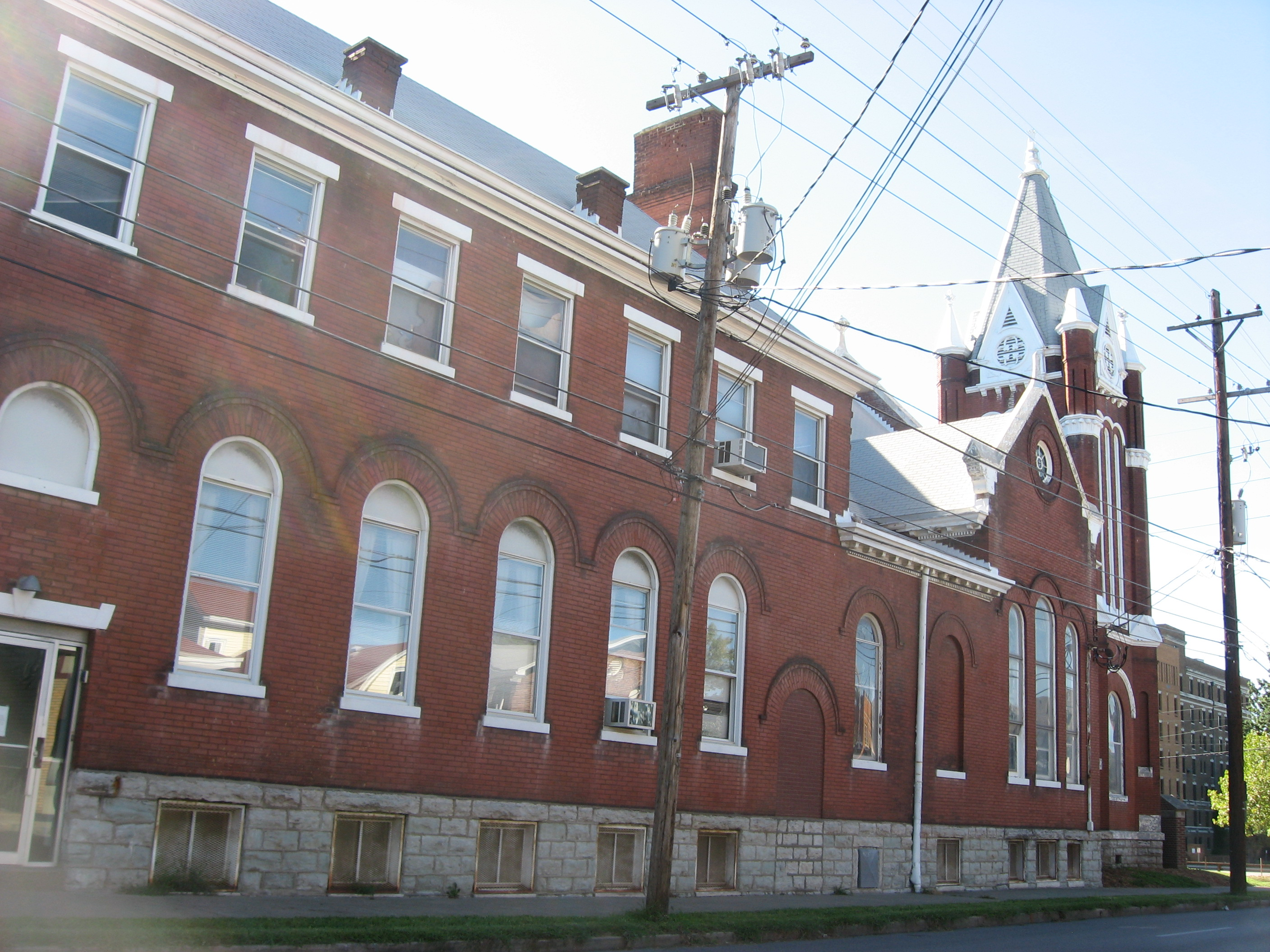
- Eastern side

- Location within Kentucky Location within the United States
- Location: 1236 E. Breckinridge St., Louisville, Kentucky
- Coordinates: 38°14′23″N 85°43′52″W
- Area: less than one acre
- Built: 1902
- Architectural style: Romanesque
- NRHP reference No.: 87000795
- Added to NRHP: May 21, 1987

The German Evangelical Church of Christ Complex (Christ Evangelical Church; United Church of Christ Complex) is a historic church complex at 1236 E. Breckinridge Street in Louisville, Kentucky. It was built during the years 1902 to 1929 and was added to the National Register of Historic Places in 1987.

The complex was deemed significant "in the area of ethnic and social history between the years 1902 and 1929. The German population was an important element to the settlement of Louisville. It was during this period the strength and influence of the German community was weakening due to national and international conflicts. The church, which is an excellent local example of Romanesque Revival style architecture, the rectory and the gymnasium addition, served as neighborhood symbols offering religious and social activities for its congregants to embrace."
