= Shelby Park, Louisville =

Neighborhood of Louisville, Kentucky

Coordinates: 38°13′58″N 85°44′45″W

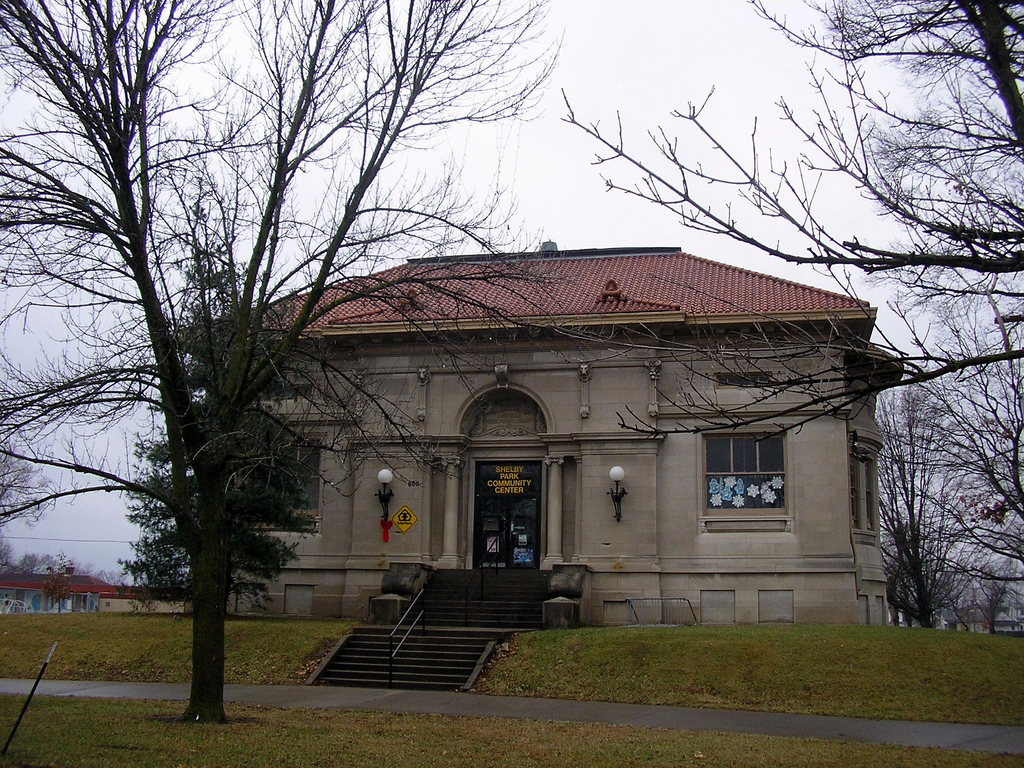
Carnegie Library in Shelby Park

Shelby Park is a neighborhood two miles southeast of downtown Louisville, Kentucky, USA, named after Kentucky's first governor, Isaac Shelby. Shelby Park has always been considered a working-class neighborhood. It was first populated by German immigrants in the early 1900s. By the 1950s, the neighborhood was majority African-American. Today, Shelby Park is a blend of ethnic and economic diversity. People from all walks of life co-exist in a vibrant, art-filled community.

The Shelby Park neighborhood is known for its 17-acre park of the same name. Shelby Park was designed by the Olmsted Firm in 1907 and is the only Olmsted park in Louisville with a Carnegie library designed by Arthur Loomis.

A gothic revival church at Oak and S. Shelby Streets constructed around 1886 is another architectural and historical landmark.

Most of the residential homes in Shelby Park were constructed around 1900 to 1910 and are shotgun-style cottages and camelbacks, with some two-story brick federal-style buildings in the mix, too.

Shelby Park is home to Logan Street Market, Louisville's first and only year-round indoor market with food vendors, artisans, coffee bar, brewery, and Farmer's Market located at Logan and Saint Catherine Streets in Shelby Park that opened its doors in October 2019.

Shelby Park is bounded by the CSX rail tracks, Kentucky Street, and I-65 and borders Germantown, Smoketown, and Old Louisville.

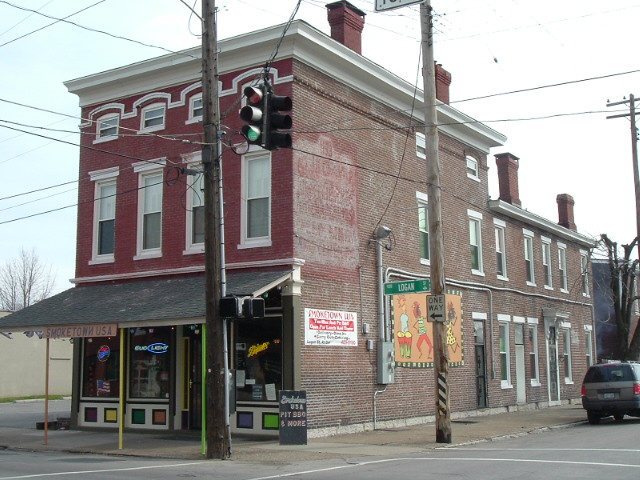

== Demographics ==
As of 2000, the population of Shelby Park was 3,204, of which 45.4% is white, 50.1% is black, 8.5% is listed as other, and 0.6% is Hispanic. College graduates are 4.2% of the population, people without a high school degree are 42.4%. Females outnumber males 50.6% to 49.4%.

== See also ==
- History of the Germans in Louisville
