= Highland Park, Louisville =

Neighborhood in Kentucky, United States

Coordinates: 38.18450°N 85.75300°W

Highland Park was a neighborhood in Louisville, Kentucky, United States, that was razed as a part of the expansion of Louisville International Airport. Its boundaries were roughly the CSX railroad tracks to the west, and what would become the Kentucky State Fair & Exposition Center and the airport on all other sides (initially these were farm land).

Highland Park was originally built largely for workers at the nearby Louisville & Nashville Railroad yard, with professor and businessman T. C. H. Vance laying out streets in the 1880s. Its relatively common name was based on its elevated location in relation to surrounding areas, particularly Louisville. Vance's daughter gave the streets their Indian-themed names, such as Hiawatha and Wampum, which was a fashionable practice at the time.

Highland Park incorporated as a city in 1890, and grew quickly to 323 families by 1900. The city would grow to include Beechmont and Wilder Park, before all were annexed by Louisville in 1922, after a 5-year court battle.

While initially centered on Louisville Avenue, the city and neighborhood's main commercial district eventually became Park Boulevard, especially after a streetcar line was installed there in 1920.

Much of the neighborhood was razed to make way for the Watterson Expressway after World War II and all of it was finally razed in the early 1990s as a part of airport expansion, a plan first announced in 1987. However, most of what was once Highland Park is now vacant, and has not been developed by the airport. The street pattern remains intact, but areas where houses once stood have been fenced off.

In 2009, the Regional Airport Authority, which owns the former Highland Park land, released plans to develop the land and re-route Crittenden Drive around it.

James Russell Lowell Elementary School was built in 1916 in Highland Park, at that time outside the Louisville city limits. It was known as the East Highland Park School. It was expanded in 1931 and demolished in 1993.
