= Eastwood, Louisville =

Neighborhood in Louisville, Kentucky

Coordinates: 38°14′01″N 85°27′11″W

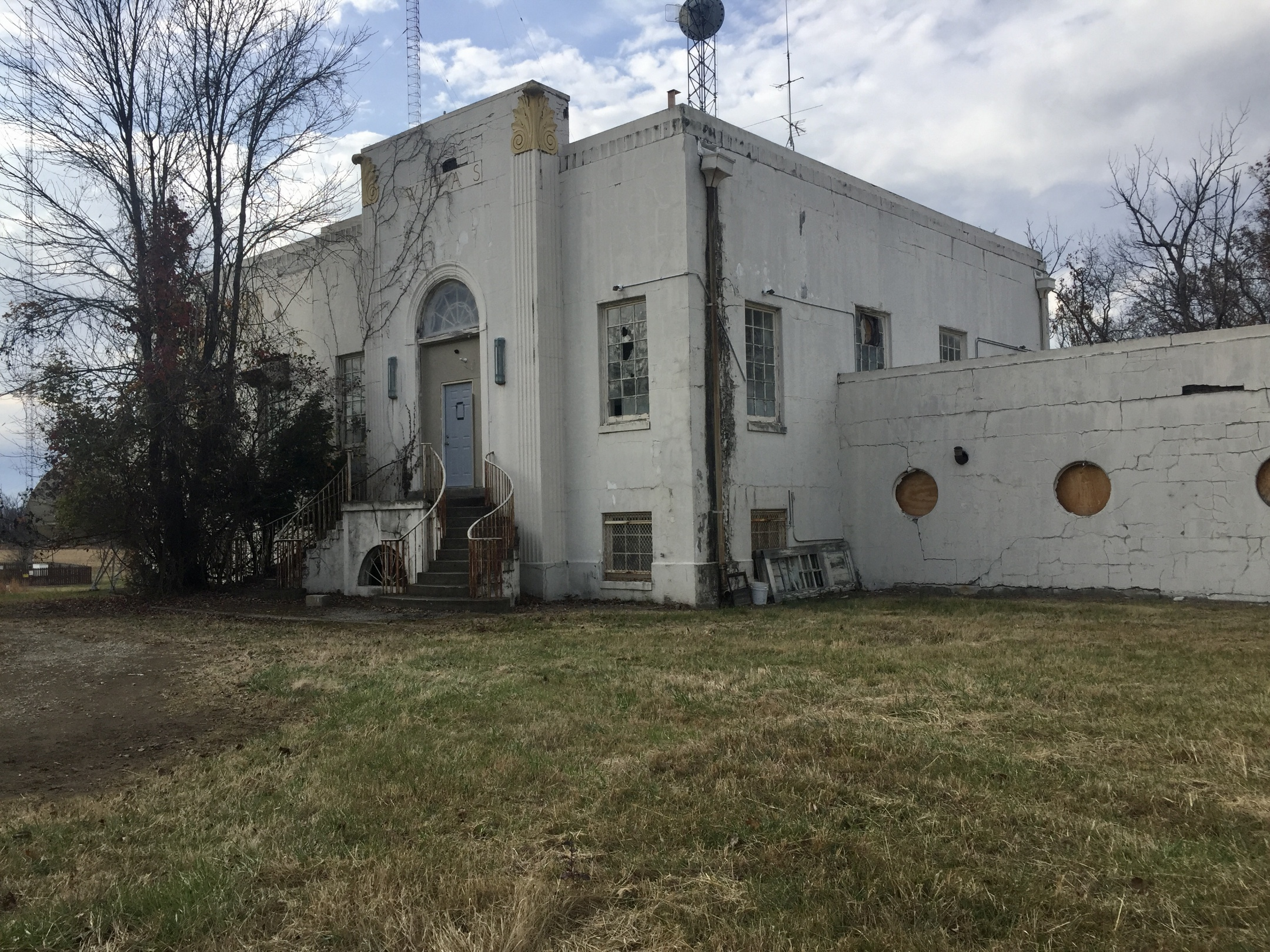
WHAS Eastwood Transmission Station

Eastwood is a neighborhood of Louisville, Kentucky, centered along Shelbyville Road (US 60) and Johnson Road. The ZIP Code for Eastwood is 40018.
