= Schnitzelburg, Louisville =

Schnitzelburg, Kentucky
- Louisville neighborhood
- Interactive map of Schnitzelburg, Kentucky
- Coordinates: 38°13′14″N 85°44′19″W
- Country: United States
- State: Kentucky
- City: Louisville
- Districts: 10

Government
  - Councilmen: Pat Mulvihill
- ZIP code(s): 40217
- Area code(s): 502
- Website: www.schnitzelburg.org

Schnitzelburg is a neighborhood three miles southeast of downtown Louisville, Kentucky. Schnitzelburg's boundaries are Clarks Lane to the south, Shelby Street to the west, the CSX railroad tracks to the north, and Goss Avenue to the east.

== History ==
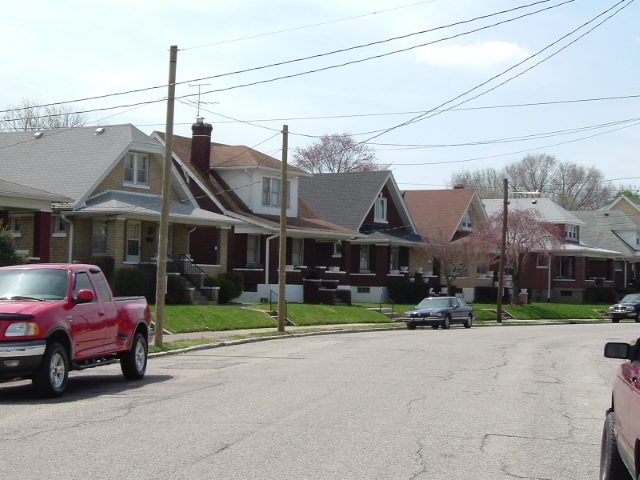
Texas Avenue in Schnitzelburg

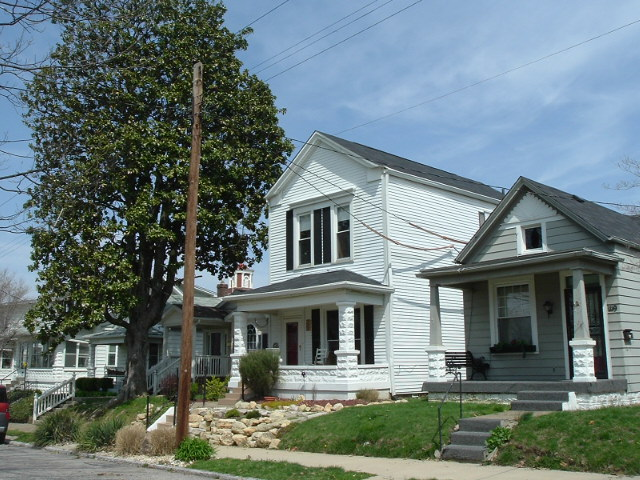
Morgan Street in Schnitzelburg

The area was first platted in 1866 by D.H. Meriwether and known as Meriwether's Enlargement. Actual construction did not begin until 1891, when a streetcar line extended to the intersection of Goss and Texas Avenues. The first residents in Schnitzelburg were immigrants who arrived from Germany. "Schnitzel" refers to a food dish, popular with Austrians and Germans.

== Culture ==
Schnitzelburg is famous for a street ball game called "Dainty," where a flat, bat-like stick is used to strike another stick on the ground, making it airborne, which is then hit like a baseball as far as possible. Every last Monday in July, the World Dainty Championship is held in the neighborhood, at the corner of Goss Avenue and Hoertz Avenue, the site of Hauck's Handy Store. The Dainty is a fundraiser for the Little Sisters of the Poor. Contestants must be 45 and older to play the Dainty.

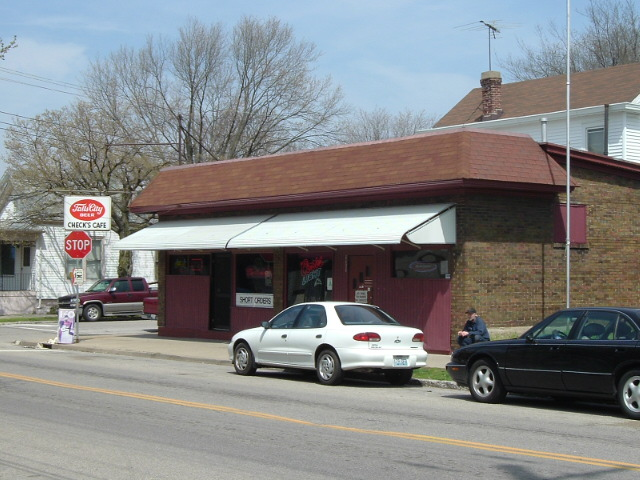
Check's Cafe

Manual Stadium is located in Schnitzelburg. Schnitzelburg is known for its number of "Shotgun-Style" homes where the homes are built narrowly with rooms being situated generally one after the other in a long row.

== Demographics ==
As of 2000, the population of Schnitzelburg was 4,420. 92.7 percent of the residents were white, and 5.1 percent were black. Hispanics made up 1.7 of the population, and 3.2 percent were listed as "other." 22.8 percent of that population were college graduates, while 20.7 percent of the population did not have a high school degree. Females outnumber males by 51.1 to 48.9 percent.

== See also ==
- German American
- History of the Germans in Louisville
