= St. Elizabeth of Hungary Roman Catholic Church =

Historic church in Kentucky, United States

- U.S. National Register of Historic Places
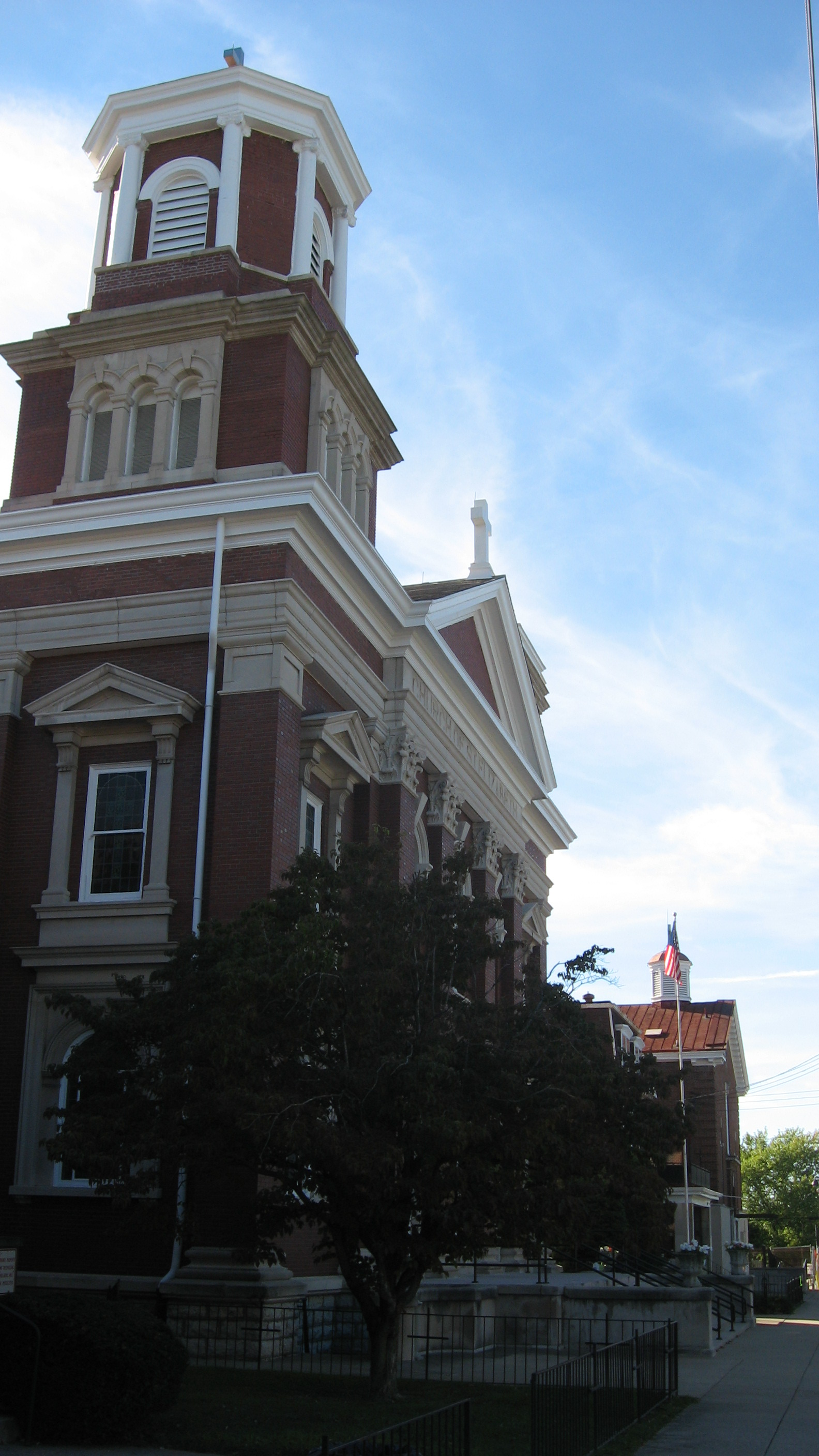
- Front of the church with its school

- Location within Kentucky Location within the United States
- Location: 1024-1028 E. Burnett St., Louisville, Kentucky
- Coordinates: 38°13′22″N 85°44′23″W
- Area: 0.4 acres (0.16 ha)
- Built: 1915
- Architect: Erhart, Fred T.
- Architectural style: Classical Revival
- NRHP reference No.: 82002721
- Added to NRHP: May 6, 1982

St. Elizabeth of Hungary Roman Catholic Church is a historic church at 1024-1028 E. Burnett Street in Louisville, Kentucky. It was completed in 1915 and added to the National Register of Historic Places in 1982.

It was designed by architect Fred T. Erhart (1870–1951).
