= Abraham Belknap =

Coat of Arms of Abraham Belknap

Abraham Belknap (1589/90-1643), of Salem, Massachusetts, not to be confused with his grandson also named Abraham (1660-about 1728), was born in England. He was one of the first settlers of New England, and all living people with the surname Belknap, Belnap, or Beltoft, are thought to be descendants of him and his wife Mary Stallion.

The European branches of families with that surname died out before this Abraham Belknap's immigration to America. Some of his descendants include: a grandson also named Abraham Belknap (1660-1728)); Samuel Belknap (1627/28-1701), Ebenezer Belknap (1667-1701) who married Hannah Ayer, Joseph Belknap who married Prudence Morris; William Belknap who married Anna Burke; US Army Brigadier General William Goldsworth Belknap; Morris Burke Belknap who married Phoebe Thompson; William Burke Belknap who married Mary Richardson; William Richardson Belknap, Eleanor Silliman Belknap Humphrey, Alice Belknap, Mary Belknap, William Burke Belknap; Christine Belknap; William Humphrey; Alice Humphrey Morgan; Edward Cornelius Humphrey; Lewis Craig Humphrey (the 2nd);Thomas MacGillivray Humphrey; Sally Reed Humphrey; and Edward Porter Humphrey (the 2nd). Clergyman and historian Jeremy Belknap (1744 – 1798), who was the founder of the Massachusetts Historical Society, mentions Abraham Belknap early in his History of New Hampshire.

== Direct American descendants ==
Many of the direct descendants of Abraham Belknap settled in or were natives of Louisville, Kentucky. They include Morris Burke Belknap (the elder) (June 25, 1780 -July 26, 1877) an iron foundry worker and founder of Belknap Hardware and Manufacturing Company; W. B. Belknap also known as William Burke Belknap (the elder) (1811–1889); Morris Burke Belknap (June 7, 1856 – April 13, 1910), also known as Colonel Morris Burke Belknap; William Burke Belknap (1885–1965), the owner of Land O'Goshen Farms; William Richardson Belknap (March 28, 1849 – June 2, 1914); genealogist Eleanor Silliman Belknap Humphrey (1876–1964); Dr. Edward Cornelius Humphrey, a World War II United States Army Major in the Medical Corps, stationed in the Ardennes; and economist Thomas M. Humphrey.
