= Indian Hills, Kentucky =

- City
- Location of Indian Hills in Jefferson County, Kentucky

- Location within the state of Kentucky Indian Hills (the United States)
- Coordinates: 38°16′24″N 85°39′37″W
- Country: United States
- State: Kentucky
- County: Jefferson
- Incorporated: 1941
- Reincorporated: 1999
- Named for: a local farm

Area
  - Total: 1.99 sq mi (5.15 km^{2})
  - Land: 1.97 sq mi (5.11 km^{2})
  - Water: 0.015 sq mi (0.04 km^{2})
- Elevation: 574 ft (175 m)

Population (2020)
  - Total: 2,860
  - Estimate (2024): 2,934
  - Density: 1,448.5/sq mi (559.28/km^{2})
- Time zone: UTC-5 (Eastern (EST))
  - Summer (DST): UTC-4 (EDT)
- ZIP code: 40207
- FIPS code: 21-39304
- GNIS feature ID: 2404757
- Website: indianhillsky.org

Indian Hills is a home rule-class city along the Ohio River in Jefferson County, Kentucky, United States. The population was 2,860 as of the 2020 census. Indian Hills and the nearby cities of Mockingbird Valley, Glenview, and Anchorage have been cited as Louisville's most prosperous suburbs since the mid-20th century. Indian Hills was among the nation's highest-income places as of the 2000 U.S. census.

== Geography ==
Indian Hills is in northeastern Jefferson County. It is bordered to the northeast by Glenview and Riverwood, to the east by Northfield, to the southeast by Windy Hills, to the south by Druid Hills and Brownsboro Village, to the southwest by Rolling Fields, and to the north by the Ohio River, which on the far bank carries the Indiana border. On all other sides, Indian Hills is bordered by the Louisville/Jefferson County consolidated government.

Interstate 71 runs through the northern part of Indian Hills, but with no direct access. U.S. Route 42 forms the community's southern boundary, leading west 6 miles (10 km) to downtown Louisville.

According to the United States Census Bureau, the city spans an area of 2.0 square miles (5.1 km^{2}), of which 0.02 square miles (0.05 km^{2}), or 0.89%, is water. The Muddy Fork of Beargrass Creek runs through Indian Hills. The region is hilly karst with numerous visible rock outcroppings, and the area is densely forested. This terrain, along with the large house lots, has been mentioned as defining features of the community.

Over a third of the land is intentionally undeveloped, mostly woodlands. Ten areas were originally developed by the Olmsted Brothers landscaping firm, and other tracts have been donated to the city over the years. Most of the undeveloped land is on Indian Hills Trail between Louisville Country Club and the Ohio River. Caperton Swamp Nature Preserve is also in the city.

The undeveloped areas around Beargrass Creek and nearly all of the city north of Interstate 71 are in the 100-year flood plain, and seasonal flooding is common. The intersection of Indian Hills Road and River Road is closed occasionally in spring due to high water.

== History ==
=== Indian Hill Stock Farm ===
The community is named for local settler John Veech's Indian Hill Stock Farm, for a time one of Kentucky's largest horse farms. Veech held over 300 acres (120 ha) as early as 1805, and his family continued to own most of the local land into the 20th century. The Georgian-style Veech house still stands at 125 Indian Hills Trail; the farm's springhouse is at 119 Arrowhead Road. (Both have been approved for listing on the National Register of Historic Places, but the property owners have so far opted against listing.) An 1877 Louisville Courier-Journal article claims the name was adopted from the hundreds of Indians camped at the site at the time of Louisville's founding in 1778, but naming developments after Indians was generally fashionable in the late 19th century.

=== Development ===
The Veech family owned much of the land into the 20th century. In 1911, the family contracted the Olmsted Brothers landscaping firm to plan the development of a golf course and subdivision. Two Indian Hills houses from this era are on the National Register of Historic Places, both in the northeastern section of the city: Midlands was built in 1913 for a member of the locally prominent Belknap family, and Blankenbaker Station was built in 1916 and was one of Louisville's first "fireproof" homes. By 1924, the Louisville Country Club had been completed, and the Semonin Company further developed the initial subdivision (sometimes called Indian Hills-Country Club) from 1927 to 1941. Initial lot restrictions required houses to be sold for at least $10,000, and this was raised to $20,000 in 1946. The state assembly formally incorporated the community on December 15, 1941. Calumet Road was the last street of the original Indian Hills plan to be built, with construction delayed until the 1950s due to the steep terrain.

=== Battles with Louisville ===
In 1954, Louisville proposed annexing Indian Hills in order to extend sewer service into the area and other developments further east. This met with such opposition that The Courier-Journal was unable to find a single supporter of annexation or sewers in Indian Hills. Two years later, the Indian Hills plans were folded into the larger "Mallon Plan" to annex most of Louisville's outlying suburbs into the city government. Leaflets distributed in Indian Hills claimed taxes would go up, Louisville buses would enter Indian Hills, and sewer service would lead to expensive and unnecessary bills. Louisville voters approved the plan by a large majority, but suburban voters rejected it by a 2-to-1 margin, and the Mallon Plan was shelved.

In the wake of the annexation vote, Indian Hills began exerting greater political autonomy, closing down a used car lot on Brownsboro Road, annexing the land, and encouraging its redevelopment for residences. (The triangle of land involved now houses the homes around Old Brownsboro Court and a small shopping center.) The city also sued the Louisville Gas & Electric Company, seeking to remove the newly installed 135-foot (41 m) electrical towers east of Indian Hills Trail. LG&E won the case by arguing that the land in question was scrubland unsuitable for commercial development.

In the 1980s, Louisville again proposed sewers for Indian Hills, this time without annexation. Indian Hills rejected the plan by a 4-to-1 margin in 1988, but extending a line through it was the only economical way to provide access to communities further east that voted for the service. Legal challenges delayed construction until 1992, but a line was then constructed through the city without connecting to any local houses. In 1995, a local resident was sued by both his neighbors and the county to deal with his overflowing septic tank; he and the septic tank companies claimed the problem could not be fixed without connecting the tank to the city sewer system. Mayor Jeanne Beam, who had opposed sewers throughout her 22-year service, abruptly resigned in June after the city commissioners announced they would no longer oppose connection. Beginning in 1999, the project became the most expensive sewer construction in Jefferson County history, costing residents $20,800–$31,200 each.

Also in 1999, Indian Hills was reincorporated after an election that merged the former Indian Hills with the neighboring cities of Indian Hills-Cherokee Section (inc. 1955), Robinswood (inc. 1965), and Winding Falls (inc. 1977). (An earlier attempt to also annex the community of Riverwood failed in 1998; Rolling Fields was approached about joining the merger but declined to participate.) The new city reached the population threshold for 4th-class status, giving it greater local control (particularly over zoning) ahead of the merger of Louisville and Jefferson County into a single metro government. It also permitted the merger of two separate local police departments.

Despite the merger, the Kentucky Secretary of State continues to list Indian Hills-Cherokee Section, Robinswood, and Winding Falls as separate and active cities.

== Demographics ==
Historical population
Census	Pop.	Note	%±
1970	1,182		—
1980	2,099		77.6%
1990	2,986		42.3%
2000	2,882		−3.5%
2010	2,868		−0.5%
2020	2,860		−0.3%
2024 (est.)	2,934		2.6%
U.S. Decennial Census

Year	Indian Hills	Indian Hills-Cherokee	Robinswood	Winding Falls
1950	291	n/a	n/a	n/a
1960	601	226	n/a	n/a
1970	600	282	300	n/a
1980	787	585	273	454
1990	1074	1005	250	657

=== 2020 census ===
As of the 2020 census, Indian Hills had a population of 2,860. The median age was 51.2 years. 21.3% of residents were under the age of 18 and 30.0% of residents were 65 years of age or older. For every 100 females there were 95.6 males, and for every 100 females age 18 and over there were 94.6 males age 18 and over.

100.0% of residents lived in urban areas, while 0.0% lived in rural areas.

There were 1,132 households in Indian Hills, of which 28.3% had children under the age of 18 living in them. Of all households, 73.4% were married-couple households, 7.8% were households with a male householder and no spouse or partner present, and 16.3% were households with a female householder and no spouse or partner present. About 18.2% of all households were made up of individuals and 13.6% had someone living alone who was 65 years of age or older.

There were 1,184 housing units, of which 4.4% were vacant. The homeowner vacancy rate was 1.4% and the rental vacancy rate was 21.9%.

Racial composition as of the 2020 census
Race	Number	Percent
White	2,639	92.3%
Black or African American	17	0.6%
American Indian and Alaska Native	1	0.0%
Asian	65	2.3%
Native Hawaiian and Other Pacific Islander	0	0.0%
Some other race	21	0.7%
Two or more races	117	4.1%
Hispanic or Latino (of any race)	68	2.4%

=== 2000 census ===
As of the census of 2000, there were 2,882 people, 1,119 households, and 914 families residing in the city. The population density was 1,459.5 inhabitants per square mile (563.5/km^{2}). There were 1,162 housing units at an average density of 588.5 per square mile (227.2/km^{2}). The racial makeup of the city was 95.70% White, 1.73% African American, 1.60% Asian, 0.03% Pacific Islander, 0.03% from other races, and 0.90% from two or more races. Hispanic or Latino of any race were 1.46% of the population.

There were 1,119 households, out of which 32.0% had children under the age of 18 living with them, 76.3% were married couples living together, 3.5% had a female householder with no husband present, and 18.3% were non-families. 16.0% of all households were made up of individuals, and 8.8% had someone living alone who was 65 years of age or older. The average household size was 2.58 and the average family size was 2.88.

In the city, the population was spread out, with 23.6% under the age of 18, 4.4% from 18 to 24, 17.1% from 25 to 44, 36.7% from 45 to 64, and 18.1% who were 65 years of age or older. The median age was 47 years. For every 100 females, there were 96.5 males. For every 100 females age 18 and over, there were 93.2 males.

The median income for a household in the city was $120,602, and the median income for a family was $134,600. Males had a median income of $98,469 versus $41,000 for females. The per capita income for the city was $66,637. About 0.5% of families and 1.2% of the population were below the poverty line, including 1.0% of those under age 18 and none of those age 65 or over.

== Notable people ==
- Jennifer Lawrence, Academy Award-winning actress

== See also ==
- The Midlands
- List of cities and towns along the Ohio River
