= William Belknap =

William Belknap may refer to:

- William W. Belknap (1829–1890), lawyer, soldier, government administrator and the United States Secretary of War
- William G. Belknap (1794–1851), United States Army general, father of William W. Belknap
- William Richardson Belknap (1849–1914), president of the Belknap Hardware and Manufacturing Company
- William Burke Belknap (1885–1965), American entrepreneur, son of William W. Belknap
