= Forbes Hawkes =

American physician and surgeon

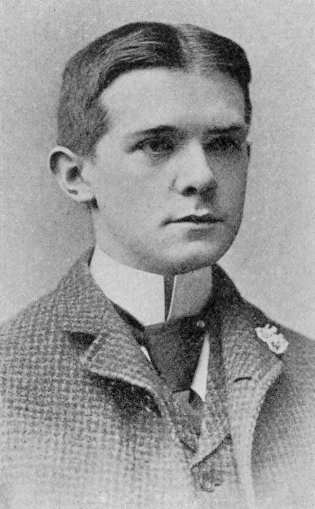
- Born: Robert Forbes Hawkes; August 25, 1865; New York City, New York, U.S.
- Died: August 24, 1940 (aged 74); Port Washington, New York, U.S.
- Education: Yale University; Columbia University College of Physicians and Surgeons
- Spouse: Alice Silliman Belknap (m. 1905)
- Parent(s): Wootton Wright Hawkes; Eliza Forbes Hawkes

Robert Forbes Hawkes (August 25, 1865 – August 24, 1940) was an American physician and surgeon who was prominent in New York society during the Gilded Age.

== Early life ==
Hawkes was born in New York City on August 25, 1865 to Wootton Wright Hawkes (1811–1887), and Eliza DeForest (née Forbes; 1823–1913). His father was a professor at Trinity College in Connecticut, and an amateur farmer in Sing Sing, New York. His older brother, Emile McDougall Hawkes, was married to (later divorced from) Eva Van Cortlandt Morris, daughter of Augustus Newbold Morris.

His early education was in Tours and Paris in France, and Marburg, Germany before graduating from Yale University in 1887. After Yale, he attended the Columbia University College of Physicians and Surgeons, graduating in 1891.

== Career ==
Following his graduation from Medical School, he did a year of post-graduate work in Vienna and Edinburgh, Scotland. Hawkes interned at New York Presbyterian Hospital. He specialized in gynecology and abdominal surgery.

Hawkes also served as the head of the dispensary for New York Presbyterian Hospital and was a consulting surgeon at the New York Presbyterian Hospital in Queens, the Loomis Sanitarium, North-Western Dispensary and several others. He was also a professor of Clinical Surgery at the Post-Graduate Hospital (today known as the New York University School of Medicine).

He was a fellow of the American College of Surgeons and a member of the New York Surgical Society, the American Urological Association, the New York Academy of Medicine, the Hospital Graduate Association, and the Presbyterian Hospital Alumni Association.

=== Society life ===
In February 1892, Hawkes was included in Ward McAllister's "Four Hundred", purported to be an index of New York's best families, published in The New York Times. Conveniently, 400 was the number of people that could fit into Mrs. Astor's ballroom. Hawkes was a member of the Union Club of the City of New York, the University Club, the Century Association, and the Piping Rock Club. He belonged to the St. Nicholas Society and was surgeon of the Society of the Cincinnati.

== Personal life ==
On April 25, 1905, Hawkes was married to suffragette Alice Silliman Belknap (1878–1972), in Louisville, Kentucky. daughter of William Richardson Belknap, the president of the Belknap Hardware and Manufacturing Company. Together, they lived at 124 East 65th Street and were the parents of a son and a daughter:

Hawkes died at his summer home, Briar Patch at Sands Point in Port Washington on Long Island, on August 24, 1940. After a funeral at his home, he was buried at Grove Street Cemetery in New Haven, Connecticut. His widow died in 1972.
