= Druid Hills (disambiguation) =

Druid Hill or Druid Hills can refer to several places in the United States:

- Druid Hills, Georgia, a neighborhood and census-designated place (CDP) in DeKalb County, partly in the city of Atlanta and partly unincorporated
  - Druid Hills High School, in DeKalb County
  - Druid Hills Road, in DeKalb County
- North Druid Hills, Georgia, a census-designated place (CDP) in unincorporated DeKalb County
- Druid Hills, Kentucky
- Druid Hill Park in Baltimore, Maryland
- Druid Hills, a historic neighborhood in Hendersonville, North Carolina
