= Glenview Hills, Kentucky =

- City
- Location of Glenview Hills in Jefferson County, Kentucky

- Location within the state of Kentucky Glenview Hills (the United States)
- Coordinates: 38°17′43″N 85°38′18″W
- Country: United States
- State: Kentucky
- County: Jefferson
- Named for: Glenview, Kentucky

Area
  - Total: 0.13 sq mi (0.33 km^{2})
  - Land: 0.13 sq mi (0.33 km^{2})
  - Water: 0 sq mi (0.00 km^{2})
- Elevation: 577 ft (176 m)

Population (2020)
  - Total: 377
  - Density: 2,991.9/sq mi (1,155.19/km^{2})
- Time zone: UTC-5 (Eastern (EST))
  - Summer (DST): UTC-4 (EDT)
- ZIP Code: 40222
- FIPS code: 21-31402
- GNIS feature ID: 2403705
- Website: www.glenviewhills.com

Glenview Hills is a home rule-class city in Jefferson County, Kentucky, United States. As of the 2020 census, Glenview Hills had a population of 377.

Glenview Hills was named for the nearby community of Glenview, although Glenview Hills was formally incorporated in 1972, more than a decade before the original town received similar recognition.

== Geography ==
Glenview Hills is located in northern Jefferson County. It is between Glenview to the north and Glenview Manor to the south. Interstate 71 follows the southern border of the community, but there is no direct access. Downtown Louisville is 9 miles (14 km) to the southwest.

According to the United States Census Bureau, the city has a total area of 0.13 square miles (0.33 km^{2}), all land.

== Demographics ==
Historical population
Census	Pop.	Note	%±
1980	433		—
1990	353		−18.5%
2000	337		−4.5%
2010	319		−5.3%
2020	377		18.2%
U.S. Decennial Census

As of the census of 2000, there were 337 people, 133 households, and 115 families residing in the city. The population density was 2,926.4 inhabitants per square mile (1,129.9/km^{2}). There were 135 housing units at an average density of 1,172.3 per square mile (452.6/km^{2}). The racial makeup of the city was 97.33% White, 1.48% Black or African American, 1.19% from other races. Hispanic or Latino of any race were 2.67% of the population.

There were 133 households, out of which 25.6% had children under the age of 18 living with them, 78.2% were married couples living together, 6.0% had a female householder with no husband present, and 13.5% were non-families. 12.0% of all households were made up of individuals, and 6.8% had someone living alone who was 65 years of age or older. The average household size was 2.53 and the average family size was 2.74.

In the city, the population was spread out, with 19.6% under the age of 18, 3.9% from 18 to 24, 16.0% from 25 to 44, 33.8% from 45 to 64, and 26.7% who were 65 years of age or older. The median age was 51 years. For every 100 females, there were 93.7 males. For every 100 females age 18 and over, there were 90.8 males.

The median income for a household in the city was $109,649, and the median income for a family was $114,914. Males had a median income of $75,000 versus $43,750 for females. The per capita income for the city was $59,069. About 6.6% of families and 9.7% of the population were below the poverty line, including 20.0% of those under age 18 and none of those age 65 or over.
