= Boxhill (Louisville) =

Historic house in Kentucky, United States

- Winkworth
- U.S. National Register of Historic Places
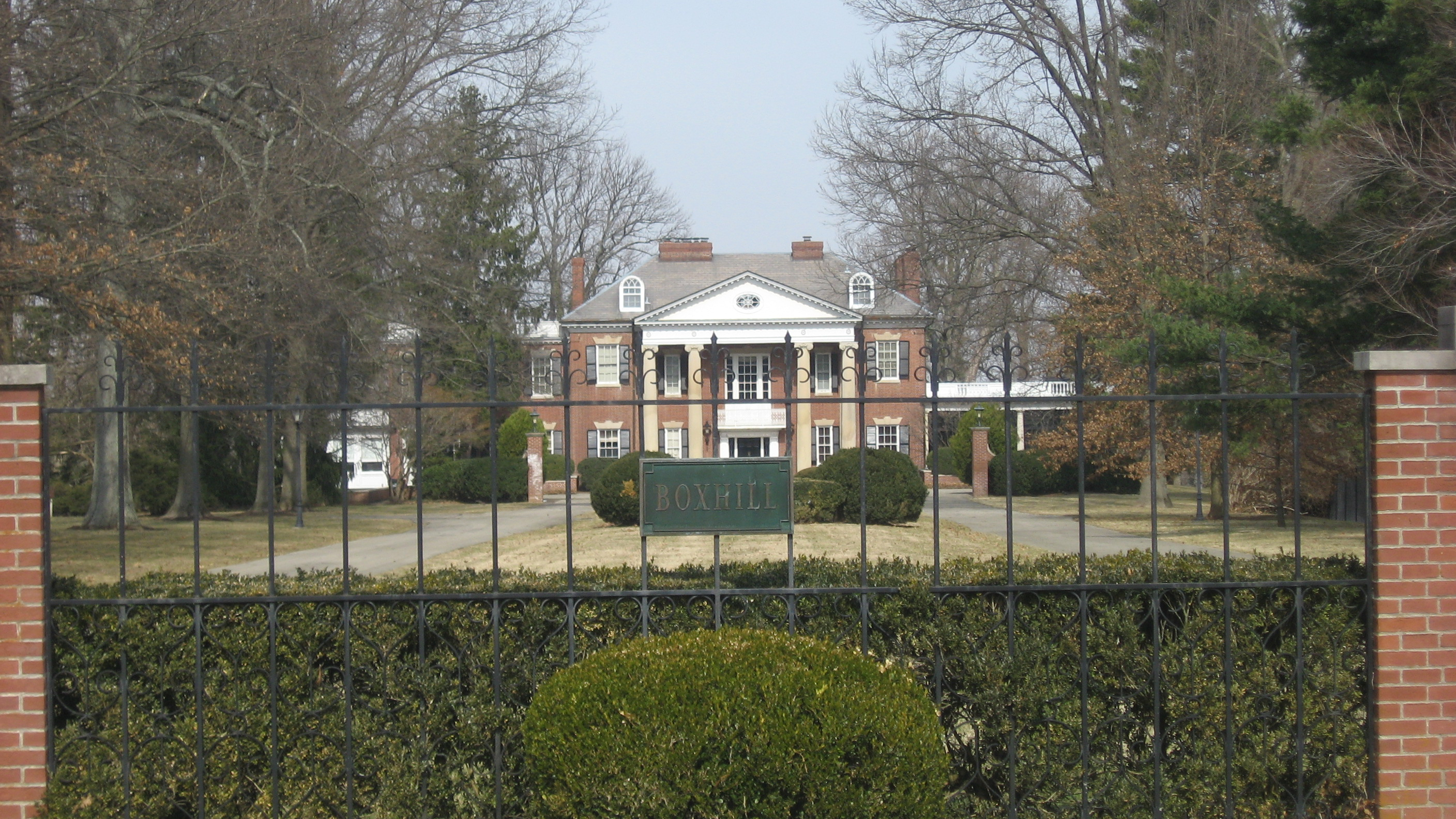
- Front, seen through the fence

- Location within Kentucky Location within the United States
- Location: 3200 Boxhill Lane, Louisville, Kentucky or Glenview, Kentucky
- Coordinates: 38°18′5″N 85°39′28″W
- Built: 1906 - 1910
- Architect: Joseph E. Chandler, Stratton Hammon (1956 addition)
- Architectural style: Georgian Revival
- MPS: Jefferson County MRA
- NRHP reference No.: 83002752
- Added to NRHP: August 16, 1983

Boxhill, also called Winkworth, is a Georgian Revival house in Glenview, Kentucky, a small city east of Louisville, Kentucky. It was built in 1906 or 1910 and added to the National Register of Historic Places in 1983.

As with other nearby mansions such as Lincliff, Boxhill reflects a period of Louisville history around the turn of the 20th century where wealthy Louisvillians built showcase homes along the Ohio River above Downtown Louisville. The 29 remaining mansions constitute the largest such collection along the 981-mile long river, and are among the best-preserved collections of turn-of-the-century estates in the United States.

== History ==
William E. Chess, president of the Chess and Wymond Cooperage Company, built Boxhill on a 75-acre (30 ha) tract on the Ohio River that he bought in 1906. The house, located on a bluff above the river, was completed by 1910. The Georgian revival house is reputed to have been designed by Boston architect Joseph E. Chandler. The landscaping, including elaborate gardens and a long tree-lined mall leading from the road to the house, is thought to have been planned by Bryant Fleming, a landscape architect from Buffalo, New York.

Chess' daughter, Mary Grace Chess Robinson, took over the property in 1917. She and her husband, Avery Robinson, vice-president of a cordage mill, lived on the estate until 1923, when they sold it to Henning Chambers, a brokerage firm executive. Portions of the original estate were sold off during the 1950s. In 1956 sidelights and a cast-iron balcony were added to the house's entry and a second story was added to a wing.

In the early 1970s Robert and Shirley Alexander from Chicago bought the property. In 1977 they were murdered in Boxhill by their stepson. He was diagnosed a schizophrenic and found incompetent to stand trial for the murder. As the mansion had been the site of a grisly double homicide, the bank which came to own it found no buyers despite offering it for sale for over three years. In 1980, Helen Combs, a veteran contractor who had restored dozens of older mansions in Louisville, purchased it for $355,000. She described the restoration process as unique, even for her, saying "The windows were out, plastic was over them, there was no furniture.... We got to this one room and opened the door, and saw big red cabbage roses on the walls, red carpet, red bedspreads and red lamps that glowed."

Combs intended to live in the house but her husband, former Kentucky governor Bert T. Combs, balked at the idea, referring to it as the "murder house". She sold the house in 1982.

The property was scheduled to be auctioned in September 2023 by Sotheby's International Realty. Proceeds were to benefit Bellarmine University, to whom the property was gifted by its former owners, Dr. Allan and Donna Lansing.

== See also ==
- National Register of Historic Places listings in Jefferson County, Kentucky
