= Goshen, Kentucky =

- City
- Location of Goshen in Oldham County, Kentucky.
- Coordinates: 38°24′10″N 85°34′57″W
- Country: United States
- State: Kentucky
- County: Oldham
- Named after: the biblical Land of Goshen

Area
  - Total: 0.20 sq mi (0.52 km^{2})
  - Land: 0.20 sq mi (0.51 km^{2})
  - Water: 0.0039 sq mi (0.01 km^{2})
- Elevation: 696 ft (212 m)

Population (2020)
  - Total: 892
  - Density: 4,524.9/sq mi (1,747.07/km^{2})
- Time zone: UTC-5 (Eastern (EST))
  - Summer (DST): UTC-4 (EDT)
- ZIP code: 40026
- Area code: 502
- FIPS code: 21-31960
- GNIS feature ID: 2403716
- Website: cityofgoshen.com

Goshen is a home rule-class city in Oldham County, Kentucky, in the United States. The population was 892 at the 2020 census.

== Geography ==
Nestled along the banks of the Ohio River northeast of Louisville.

According to the United States Census Bureau, the city has a total area of 0.2 square miles (0.52 km^{2}), all land.

== History ==
Founded in 1849, the community was first known as Saltillo for the Mexican city near the 1847 Battle of Buena Vista during the Mexican–American War. When a new post office opened in 1851, it was named Goshen for the biblical Land of Goshen, which was described by American commentators as having had good soil. It was formally incorporated by the state assembly in 1990.

== Demographics ==
Historical population
Census	Pop.	Note	%±
1880	40		—
2000	907		—
2010	909		0.2%
2020	892		−1.9%
U.S. Decennial Census

As of the census of 2010, there were 909 people, 304 households, and 261 families residing in the city. The population density was 4,655.8 inhabitants per square mile (1,797.6/km^{2}). There were 293 housing units at an average density of 1,504.0 per square mile (580.7/km^{2}). The racial makeup of the city was 95.00% White, 2.40% African American, 0.80% Asian, 1.00% from other races, and 0.60% from two or more races. Hispanic or Latino of any race were 3.40% of the population.

There were 304 households, out of which 52.3% had children under the age of 18 living with them, 69.7% were married couples living together, 11.5% had a female householder with no husband present, and 14.1% were non-families. 11.4% of all households were made up of individuals, and 4.6% had someone living alone who was 65 years of age or older. The average household size was 2.99 and the average family size was 3.24.

In the city, the population was spread out, with 25.6% under the age of 18, 9.0% from 18 to 24, 36.6% from 25 to 44, 34.3% from 45 to 64, and 9.3% who were 65 years of age or older. The median age was 39.1 years. For every 100 females, there were 99.8 males. For every 100 females age 18 and over, there were 93.4 males.

The median income for a household in the city was $84,250, and the median income for a family was $88,958. Males had a median income of $65,583 versus $51,667 for females. The per capita income for the city was $23,076. None of the families and 0.3% of the population were living below the poverty line, including none under 18 and 8.1% of those over 64.

== Economy ==
It is known for its thoroughbred breeding farms, such as Upson Downs Farm and Sunny Acres Horse Farm (now occupied by Forever Green Farm Riding Academy). Goshen also is home to other farming operations, such as a tree farm called The Riverfarm. Goshen was formerly the location of Land O' Goshen farms, a horse and sheep breeding farm owned and operated by William Burke Belknap.

Goshen is home to various operations that are Kentucky Proud producers, these include: River Farm Nursery, Round Hill Farm LLC, Golden Drop Honey, Babs Bees, Field 51 Produce, and Blue Skies Horse Farm LLC.

== Education ==
Goshen has a lending library, a branch of the Oldham County Public Library.

== Notable people ==
- Justin Thomas, professional golfer
- William Burke Belknap, professor of economics at the University of Louisville
