= Lincliff =

Historic house in Kentucky, United States

- U.S. National Register of Historic Places
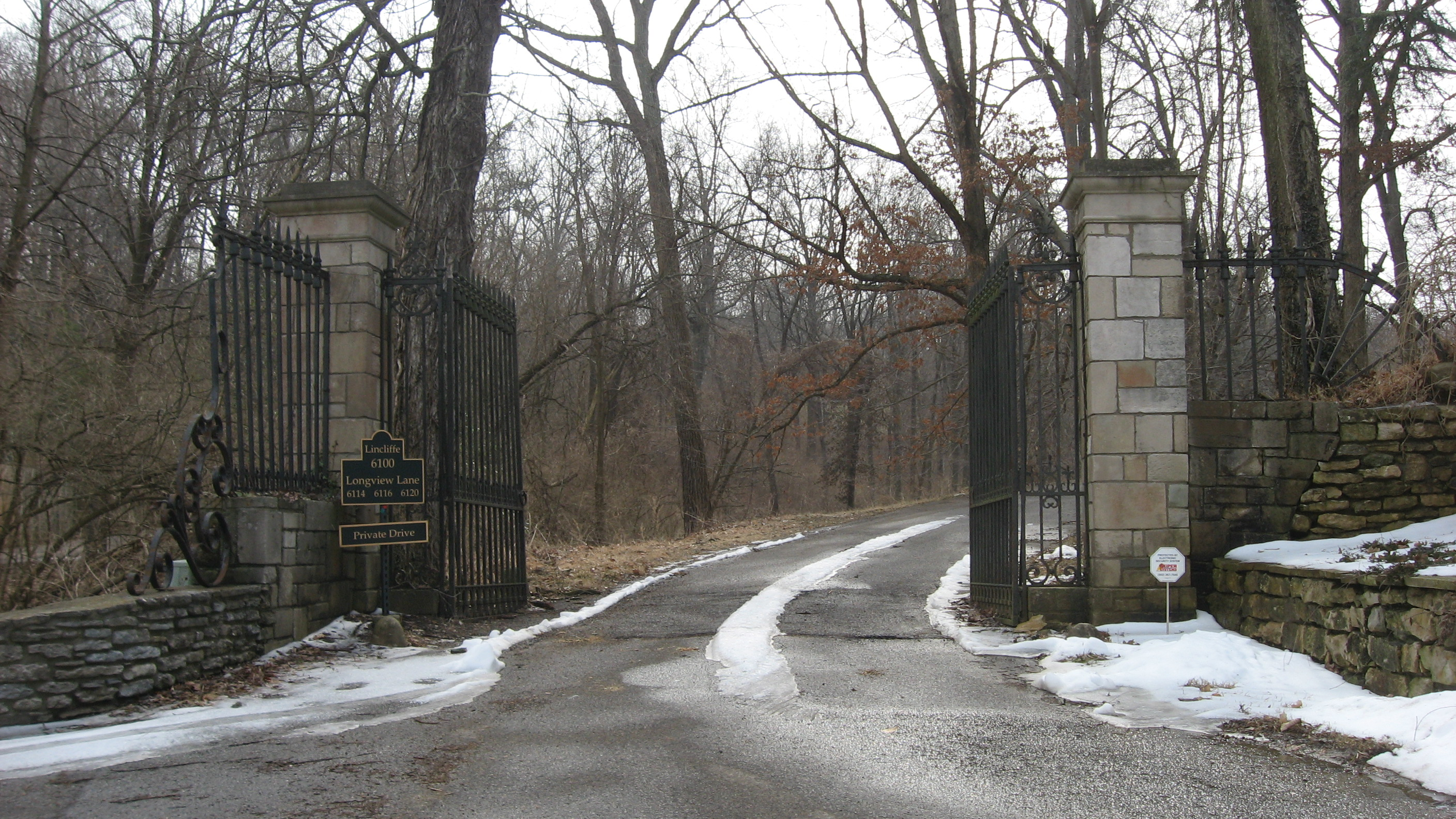
- Gates at the end of the drive

- Location within Kentucky Location within the United States
- Location: 6100 Longview Lane, Louisville, Kentucky
- Coordinates: 38°17′45″N 85°39′45″W
- Area: 29.5 acres (11.9 ha)
- Built: 1911
- Architect: Kenneth McDonald; William J. Dodd
- Architectural style: Colonial Revival, Georgian Revival
- MPS: Jefferson County MRA
- NRHP reference No.: 83002694
- Added to NRHP: August 16, 1983

Lincliff is a Georgian Revival house in Glenview near Louisville, Kentucky, United States, built in the early 1910s by William Richardson Belknap.

== History ==
Lincliff was built in 1911-12 for William Richardson Belknap, president of Belknap Hardware and Manufacturing Company, one of the largest wholesale hardware firms in the United States at that time. The hardware company, founded by Belknap's father, William Burke Belknap, is no longer extant, but some of its former buildings have been adapted for other uses. The William Richardson Belknap family was long active in civic, cultural, and philanthropic affairs in Louisville. Lincliff was the childhood home of genealogist Eleanor Silliman Belknap Humphrey, Land O' Goshen Farms horse breeder William Burke Belknap, and their siblings. The Lincliff estate was sold out of the Belknap family in 1922 according to the Kentucky Historic Resources Inventory: JF-531 in the Jefferson County Office of Historic Preservation and Archives.

=== Subsequent owners ===
In 1945, it was purchased by the C. Edwin Gheens family. Mr. Gheens owned the Bradas and Gheens Candy Company. His widow, later Mrs. Richard H. Hill, was involved in many civic and philanthropic causes and lived at Lincliff until her death in 1982.

Since 2000, Lincliff was one of the principal residences of the late writer Sue Grafton and her husband Steven F. Humphrey. Grafton, a Kentucky native, thought she had left Kentucky behind for California until her husband found Lincliff, a "crumbling estate begging to be saved." Humphrey is the "driving force behind the restoration of the estate doing the work himself of returning many of the garden's elements to their original splendor."

=== National Register of Historic Places ===
The house was listed on the National Register of Historic Places in 1983. Lincliff was recorded in the Courthouse Deed Book 5344, p. JF-531 in 1911 as a property and residence on approximately 29.6 acres on Louisville's River Road along the Ohio River.
