= Northfield, Kentucky =

- City
- Location of Northfield in Jefferson County, Kentucky

- Location within the state of Kentucky Northfield (the United States)
- Coordinates: 38°17′09″N 85°38′11″W
- Country: United States
- State: Kentucky
- County: Jefferson
- Incorporated: 1965

Area
  - Total: 0.47 sq mi (1.22 km^{2})
  - Land: 0.47 sq mi (1.22 km^{2})
  - Water: 0 sq mi (0.00 km^{2})
- Elevation: 584 ft (178 m)

Population (2020)
  - Total: 991
  - Density: 2,103.9/sq mi (812.33/km^{2})
- Time zone: UTC-5 (Eastern (EST))
  - Summer (DST): UTC-4 (EDT)
- ZIP Code: 40222
- FIPS code: 21-56730
- GNIS feature ID: 2404399
- Website: www.cityofnorthfield.com

Northfield is a home rule-class city in Jefferson County, Kentucky, United States. As of the 2020 census, Northfield had a population of 991.

== History ==
Northfield was incorporated in July 1965. One of the factors in incorporation was the threat of annexation by nearby St. Matthews. The city is located on a subdivision of the former 3,500 acre Glenview horse farm.

Northfield was one of the hardest hit neighborhoods when Louisville was hit by an F4 tornado on April 3, 1974. This tornado was part of the 1974 Super Outbreak of 148 tornadoes that hit 13 U.S. states and one Canadian province.

== Geography ==
Northfield is located in northeastern Jefferson County. It is bordered to the north by Glenview Manor, to the south by Crossgate, and otherwise by consolidated Louisville/Jefferson County. Downtown Louisville is 8 miles (13 km) to the southwest.

According to the United States Census Bureau, Northfield has a total area of 0.47 square miles (1.22 km^{2}), all land.

== Demographics ==
Historical population
Census	Pop.	Note	%±
1970	364		—
1980	906		148.9%
1990	898		−0.9%
2000	970		8.0%
2010	1,020		5.2%
2020	991		−2.8%
U.S. Decennial Census

As of the census of 2000, there were 970 people, 367 households, and 252 families residing in the city. The population density was 2,196.6 inhabitants per square mile (848.1/km^{2}). There were 421 housing units at an average density of 953.4 per square mile (368.1/km^{2}). The racial makeup of the city was 94.43% White, 4.23% African American, 1.24% Asian, and 0.10% from two or more races. Hispanic or Latino of any race were 0.82% of the population.

There were 367 households, out of which 27.2% had children under the age of 18 living with them, 62.4% were married couples living together, 5.2% had a female householder with no husband present, and 31.3% were non-families. 27.0% of all households were made up of individuals, and 9.8% had someone living alone who was 65 years of age or older. The average household size was 2.32 and the average family size was 2.85.

In the city, the population was spread out, with 19.8% under the age of 18, 3.9% from 18 to 24, 22.1% from 25 to 44, 26.3% from 45 to 64, and 27.9% who were 65 years of age or older. The median age was 49 years. For every 100 females, there were 81.6 males. For every 100 females age 18 and over, there were 82.6 males.

The median income for a household in the city was $83,752, and the median income for a family was $105,620. Males had a median income of $82,403 versus $40,000 for females. The per capita income for the city was $41,490. None of the families and 1.5% of the population were living below the poverty line, including no under eighteens and 3.0% of those over 64.

== Economy and culture ==
Holiday Manor Shopping Center opened in 1963, named for the Holiday Inn located on US-42 near the Watterson Expressway exchange. Kroger has been an anchor tenant since it opened.
