= Rogers Clark Ballard Memorial School =

- Rogers Clark Ballard School
- U.S. National Register of Historic Places
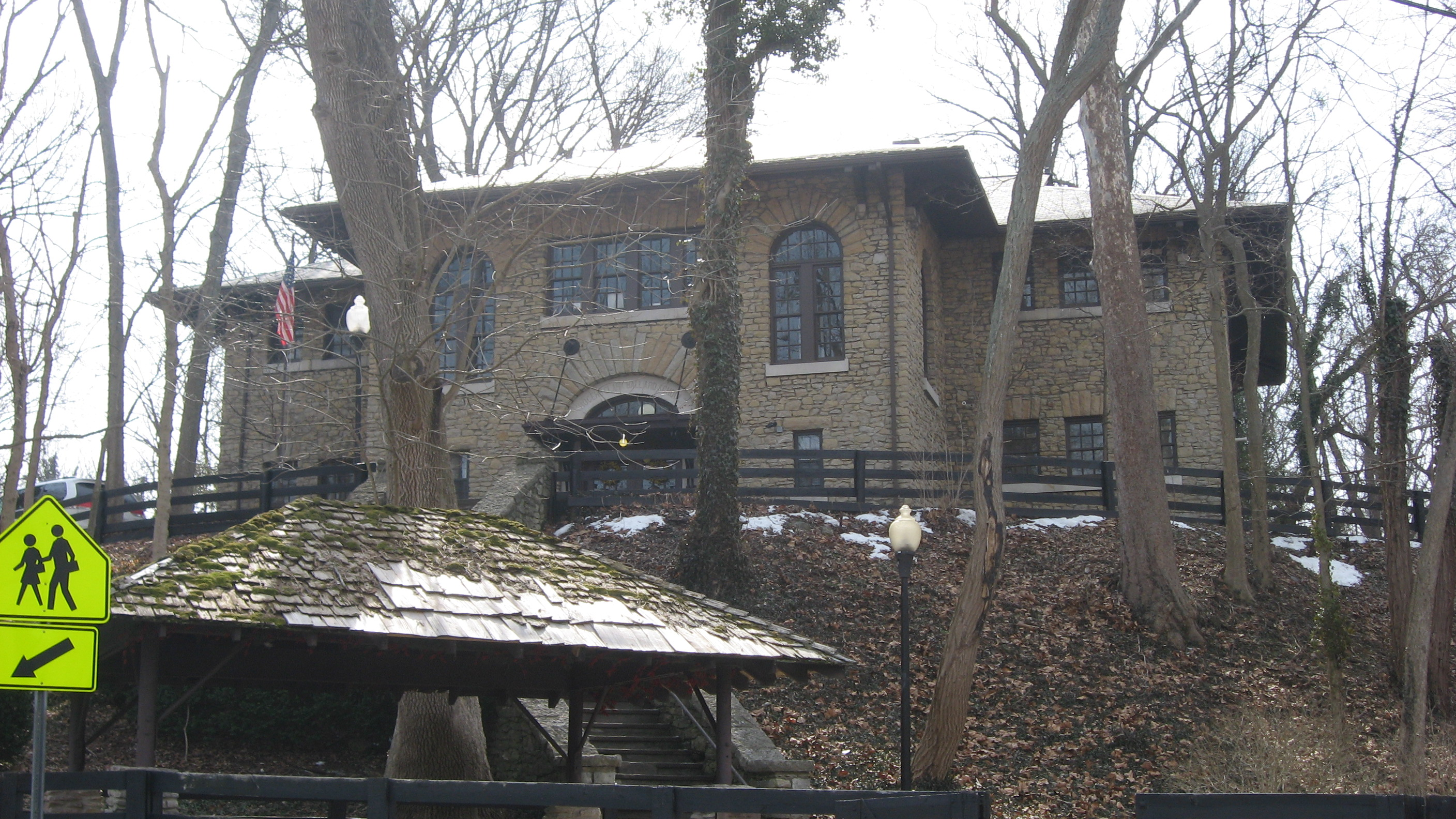

- Location within Kentucky Location within the United States
- Location: Glenview, Kentucky
- Coordinates: 38°18′47″N 85°38′44″W
- Built: 1914
- Architect: John Bacon Hutchings
- NRHP reference No.: 83003697
- Added to NRHP: December 8, 1983

Rogers Clark Ballard Memorial School is a historic building in Glenview, Kentucky, part of the Louisville metropolitan area.

It was built in 1914 and added to the National Register of Historic Places in 1983.

John Bacon Hutchings (1859–1916) was the architect for the Arts and Crafts-style building. The school was named after Rogers Clark Ballard, a boy who died in 1909. He was from a prominent family in Louisville, and his parents, Mr. and Mrs. S. Thruston Ballard, donated the site for the school from their land and gave $6,000 toward the building. The school began as a result of a joint effort by parents and the county board of education. When it opened in 1914, the school replaced four one-room schools in eastern Jefferson County.

The school was known as Ballard School. It originally accepted students from different areas, but that changed in 1949, when the county board adopted a resolution that students had to attend school in the district where they lived. This school eventually closed in 1959. It was superseded by Wilder Elementary School in the Jefferson County Public School system. Ballard High School, which opened nearby in 1968, was named for this previous school.

The building is now the home of a private school, Virginia Chance School, for students age 2 through fifth grade. The school is situated on 26 acres on a bluff overlooking the Ohio River, surrounded by woods and fields. The two-story main building has had extensive renovation that was designed to remain sensitive to the history of the building as the former Rogers Clark Ballard Memorial School.

== See also ==
- National Register of Historic Places listings in Jefferson County, Kentucky
