= Belknap, Louisville =

Belknap
- Louisville neighborhood
- Interactive map of Belknap
- Coordinates: 38°13′13″N 85°41′08″W
- Country: United States
- State: Kentucky
- City: Louisville
- ZIP code(s): 40205
- Area code(s): 502
- Website: www.belknapneighborhood.org

Belknap is an urban neighborhood three and a half miles east of downtown Louisville, Kentucky, USA. The neighborhood is bound by Bardstown Road, Douglass Boulevard, Dundee Road and Newburg Road. It is part of a larger area of Louisville called the Highlands. Belknap is often described as the neighborhood in the heart of The Highlands.

== History ==
=== Early history ===
The Belknap neighborhood was once farm land, two miles (3 km) south of where Bardstown Road (then Bardstown Turnpike) began at Highland Avenue. There was a stagecoach stop at Douglass Boulevard and Bardstown Road called the "Two-mile House." Abraham Lincoln frequented the stagecoach stop when he was visiting the Speed Family at Farmington.

As the city of Louisville grew, so did the Highlands. The Catholic parish St. Francis of Assisi built its first church on the Michael Zimlich property in 1886. Zimlich sold 24 acres (97,000 m^{2}) in 1901, paving the way for one of the first commercial strips along Bardstown and Dundee roads. In 1909, the Eilers family sold a 22 foot (7 m) easement for the streetcar turnaround and the annexation of the loop occurred, now called Douglass Loop. Zimlich later sold 26 more acres, and between 1916 and 1918 Boulevard Napoleon was developed.

When 30 acres (120,000 m^{2}) of adjacent property, owned by the Heintzmann family, was sold, it became the first section of University Park, so named because it would lead to the University of Louisville. The street names were changed in 1918 to Ivy League school names, such as Harvard and Yale, to connect to the new subdivision. However, a building bond to facilitate the new campus was rejected by voters in 1920, and the plan never materialized.

The original school on Sils Avenue was named for William Richardson Belknap (William Burke Belknap's son) and opened in 1916, two years after his death. When the school opened, it was a city school, but most of the area was still county. The county children had to go to Maple Grove, present day location of Air Devil's Inn, across from Bowman Field on Taylorsville Road.

=== 1920s ===
In the 1920s, there was another annexation, and the final annexation occurred in 1958. The sixth class cities were incorporated in the 1920s, making Strathmoor Manor within the boundaries of the Belknap neighborhood.

In 1923, the University of Louisville sold their property, and the development style in the area changed. Some of the land was sold to William F. Randolph, who preferred the curvilinear features that followed the natural contours of the land and other developers followed his lead.

When the Fred Kaelin farm was auctioned from a mule truck in 1923, there were two homes on the property. One still stands on Eastview Avenue (since converted to apartments). The other was razed to build a Walgreens drug store at Bardstown Road and Trevilian Way. The stone part of a house on Lakeside Drive was originally the springhouse for the farm.

Lakeside Swim Club opened in 1924 at the site of a former rock quarry. This private club is known for its steep, 40 foot rock walls and huge quarry "lake" – actually a 3.2 million US gallon (12,000 m^{3}) swimming pool, with a flat concrete bottom and depths ranging from 3 to 20 feet (6 meters).

=== 1940s ===
The Trough Springs property once belonged to Jonathan Clark, brother of George Rogers and William Clark. It was built before Kentucky became a state. The Doup cemetery, at 2700 Bardstown Road, was incorporated in 1812. In 1949, Bellarmine University was founded in the area.

=== 2010s ===
In 2010, Kroger petitioned the Louisville Metro Planning Commission to install a five bay gasoline station in the back of the old Hollywood Video store in the 2400 block of Bardstown Road. Kroger forecast the gasoline station would sell 50,000 gallons of gasoline each week at the proposed location behind homes located on Trevillian Way and Lakeside Drive. The Belknap Neighborhood Association opposed the gasoline station based upon existing binding elements prohibiting a gasoline station, expected impact on traffic, environment, property values and quality of life. The Louisville Metro Planning Commission considered the case in an epic five-and-a-half-hour meeting on August 19, 2010. The commission denied Kroger's request by a unanimous vote with one abstention. The denial is the first case in which Kroger was denied the ability to build a gas station in Kentucky.

The Belknap Neighborhood Association voted unanimously in 2011, to support the restoration and landmarking of the iconic Hogan's Fountain Pavilion in Cherokee Park. Belknap was the first Louisville neighborhood to come out in support of the E.J. Schickli masterpiece which is considered by residents the most recognizable landmark in the Louisville Highlands. Belknap made two financial donations in 2011, and 2012, to support the campaign to restore the TeePee and challenged all other Highland Neighborhood Associations to step up and do the same. The structure, otherwise known as the TeePee or Witch's Hat is officially named the McCall Shelter in honor of Alderman C.W. "Ches" McCall who was killed in an auto accident in 1962.

== Architecture ==
The Belknap neighborhood has many styles and ages of houses, the different styles represent more than a century of development. Some include: Bungalow, Arts & Crafts Movement, American Foursquare, Antebellum and Dutch Colonial. A handful of antebellum structures remain, including a former farmhouse on Eastview Avenue (now apartments), and a barn behind a house near the Douglass Loop.

== Recognition ==
Belknap was recognized by Louisville Magazine in October 2010 as one of the most livable and lovable neighborhoods in Louisville and Jefferson County, Kentucky. In 2012, the neighborhood received a national award from Neighborhoods, USA. The recognition by Neighborhoods, USA is the first time a Kentucky neighborhood was recognized by this organization.

Belknap is known to be a diverse neighborhood, and was rated as one of the most walkable neighborhoods in Louisville, based upon walkabilityscore.com. Belknap has one of the highest voter registrations of Democrats in all of Jefferson County and is home to U.S. Senate Majority Leader Mitch McConnell and his wife Elaine Chao, former president of the United Way, director of the Peace Corps and United States Secretary of Labor.

== Belknap Fall Festival ==
The Belknap Neighborhood Association stages the Belknap Fall Festival each year on the second Friday and Saturday of October. It has grown to become the largest Fall festival in the Louisville Highlands, in 2011 drawing a two-day crowd of 18,000 people. The festival showcases the work of over 100 artists, musicians, nonprofits, education organizations and community resources. The festival is produced completely by volunteers and proceeds raised go to support the mission of the Belknap Neighborhood Association - including neighborhood improvements.

== Demographics ==
In the 2010 census, the population of Belknap was 4,730, making it the largest neighborhood in the Louisville Highlands. The population is comprised: 95.8% are white, 1.9% are people listed as other, 1.3% are black, and 1% are Hispanic. College graduates are 57.8% of the population, people without a high school diploma are 3.8%. Females outnumber males 55% to 45%. The Belknap neighborhood has the highest median household income of any neighborhood in the Louisville Highlands. It has the lowest percentage of homes in foreclosure, the highest percentage of owner occupied housing and the lowest percentage of households in poverty.

== See also ==
- Willam R. Belknap School – designated on the National Register of Historic Places
- Bellarmine University – located in the northwest corner of the neighborhood
