= Rolling Fields, Kentucky =

- City
- Location of Rolling Fields in Jefferson County, Kentucky

- Location within the state of Kentucky Rolling Fields (the United States)
- Coordinates: 38°16′08″N 85°40′15″W
- Country: United States
- State: Kentucky
- County: Jefferson

Area
  - Total: 0.23 sq mi (0.60 km^{2})
  - Land: 0.23 sq mi (0.60 km^{2})
  - Water: 0 sq mi (0.00 km^{2})
- Elevation: 561 ft (171 m)

Population (2020)
  - Total: 720
  - Density: 3,100.3/sq mi (1,197.05/km^{2})
- Time zone: UTC-5 (Eastern (EST))
  - Summer (DST): UTC-4 (EDT)
- ZIP Code: 40207
- FIPS code: 21-66486
- GNIS feature ID: 2404645
- Website: rollingfieldsky.org

Rolling Fields is a home rule-class city in Jefferson County, Kentucky, United States. As of the 2020 census, Rolling Fields had a population of 720. It incorporated as a city in 1958.

It was the fifth-wealthiest city in Kentucky by median household income in 2000. It is adjacent to the similar small cities of Indian Hills and Mockingbird Valley, and all three are served by the Indian Hills Police Department.

After settlement by Europeans, the land was part of the Veech family farm for over 100 years. Land from the farm was also developed into Indian Hills and the adjoining Louisville Country Club. Most of the homes in Rolling Fields were built in the 1940s and 1950s.

== Geography ==
Rolling Fields is located in northern Jefferson County. It is bordered to the west by Mockingbird Valley, to the east by Indian Hills, and otherwise by consolidated Louisville/Jefferson County. It is 5 miles (8 km) east of downtown Louisville.

According to the United States Census Bureau, the city of Rolling Fields has a total area of 0.23 square miles (0.60 km^{2}), all of it recorded as land.

Swing Lane west of Club Lane is actually in Mockingbird Valley, although the only egress is into Rolling Hills. The homes on the east side of the lane are in Rolling Fields, while those on the west side are either in Mockingbird Valley or Louisville.

== Demographics ==
Historical population
Census	Pop.	Note	%±
1960	816		—
1970	714		−12.5%
1980	731		2.4%
1990	593		−18.9%
2000	648		9.3%
2010	646		−0.3%
2020	720		11.5%
U.S. Decennial Census

As of the census of 2000, there were 648 people, 253 households, and 195 families residing in the city. The population density was 2,687.5 inhabitants per square mile (1,037.6/km^{2}). There were 263 housing units at an average density of 1,090.8 per square mile (421.2/km^{2}). The racial makeup of the city was 99.07% White, 0.15% African American, 0.15% Asian, 0.62% from other races. Hispanic or Latino of any race were 0.46% of the population.

There were 253 households, out of which 36.8% had children under the age of 18 living with them, 70.0% were married couples living together, 6.3% had a female householder with no husband present, and 22.9% were non-families. 19.8% of all households were made up of individuals, and 13.8% had someone living alone who was 65 years of age or older. The average household size was 2.56 and the average family size was 2.97.

In the city, the population was spread out, with 28.7% under the age of 18, 2.0% from 18 to 24, 20.8% from 25 to 44, 28.2% from 45 to 64, and 20.2% who were 65 years of age or older. The median age was 44 years. For every 100 females, there were 84.6 males. For every 100 females age 18 and over, there were 76.3 males.

The median income for a household in the city was $122,386, and the median income for a family was $138,765. Males had a median income of $100,000 versus $41,875 for females. The per capita income for the city was $73,152. None of the families and 1.5% of the population were living below the poverty line, including no under eighteens and 2.4% of those over 64.
