= Mockingbird Valley, Kentucky =

- City
- Location of Mockingbird Valley in Jefferson County, Kentucky

- Location within the state of Kentucky Mockingbird Valley (the United States)
- Coordinates: 38°16′12″N 85°40′54″W
- Country: United States
- State: Kentucky
- County: Jefferson
- Incorporated: c. 1940

Area
  - Total: 0.21 sq mi (0.54 km^{2})
  - Land: 0.21 sq mi (0.54 km^{2})
  - Water: 0 sq mi (0.00 km^{2})
- Elevation: 502 ft (153 m)

Population (2020)
  - Total: 175
  - Density: 845.6/sq mi (326.48/km^{2})
- Time zone: UTC-5 (Eastern (EST))
  - Summer (DST): UTC-4 (EDT)
- ZIP Code: 40207
- FIPS code: 21-52842
- GNIS feature ID: 2404279

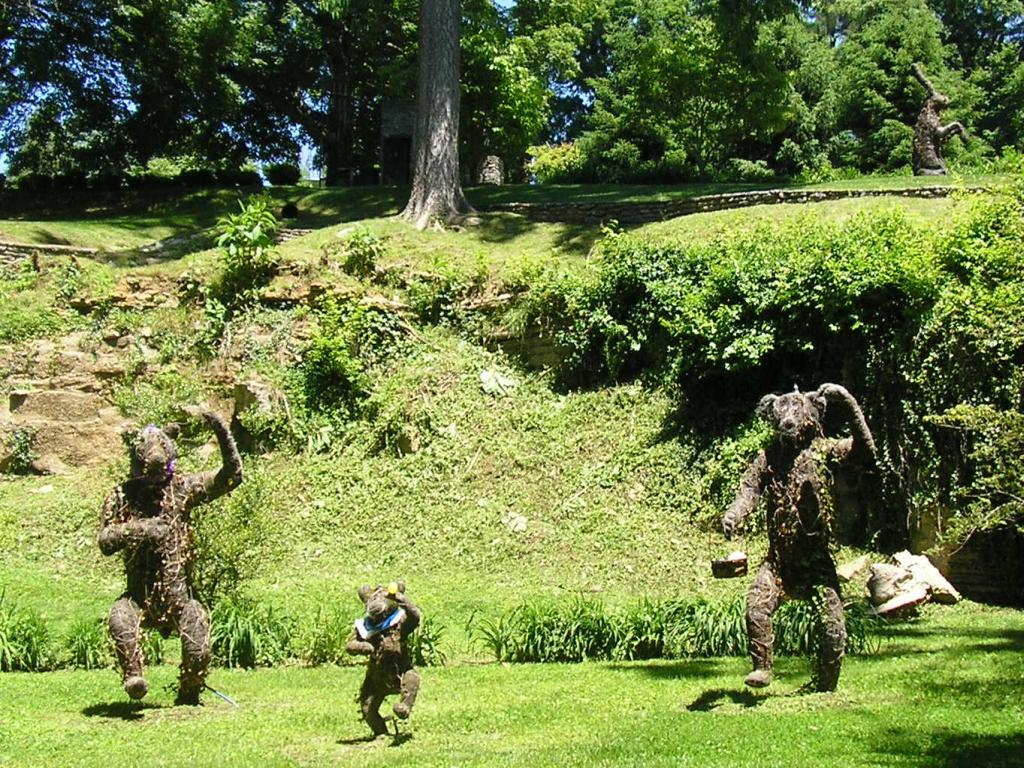
These local-landmark lawn sculptures are part of the distinctive Mockingbird Valley Road

Mockingbird Valley is a home rule-class city in Jefferson County, Kentucky, United States. Since incorporation, there has been some interest in making it a historic preservation district, largely to prevent unwanted development. As of the 2020 census, Mockingbird Valley had a population of 175. It has the highest per capita income of any location in Kentucky and the tenth-highest of any location in the United States.

Located directly to the east of Louisville along the Ohio River, Mockingbird Valley is frequently referred to as a "country enclave" and is noted for its rural feel. It is located on river bluffs and rolling hills, with large homes set back from the road, heavy tree density, bridges and walls using traditional local materials, as well as undisturbed rock outcroppings. One-third of the roads are privately owned, and the entire city is zoned residential except for a small commercial parking lot.

== History ==
The first house, Rock Hill, was built in 1840 near River Road and still remains. Although it was initially agricultural, wealthy Louisvillians eventually began building summer homes in Mockingbird Valley, starting with Atilla Cox in 1905 (nearby Cox Park is named for his wife Carrie). An interurban railroad soon allowed for commuting to Downtown Louisville, and the first year-round house was built by Stuart English Duncan in 1908. Planned subdivisions were soon built in the area: the Jarvis addition in 1912, Green Hills in 1924, and Overbrook in 1929. It incorporated as a city in 1940. Development has continued slowly as late as 2006, with a final subdivision, Mockingbird Valley River Bluff, being built on 15 lots covering 54 acres (220,000 m^{2}). The city's history is roughly similar to that of Glenview and Anchorage, two other eastern Jefferson County cities.

The Louisville Country Club is located near Mockingbird Valley, its clubhouse built in 1910 and designed by the architectural firm of McDonald & Dodd. The golf course was originally designed by Tom Bendelow and redesigned in 1924 by Walter Travis In 1999, it was one of several private clubs named in a discrimination lawsuit and was eventually forced to turn over its membership records, though no investigation was ever conducted by the state Human Rights Commission. It admitted its first black member in February 2006.

== Geography ==
Mockingbird Valley is located in northern Jefferson County. It is bordered to the east by Rolling Fields and on all other sides by consolidated Louisville/Jefferson County. It is 5 miles (8 km) northeast of downtown Louisville.

According to the United States Census Bureau, the city has a total area of 0.21 square miles (0.55 km^{2}), all of it recorded as land.

== Wildlife ==
Numerous wild animals reside in Mockingbird Valley, including white-tailed deer, coyote, red fox, groundhog, opossum, raccoon and the occasional mink. Birding enthusiasts have also recorded sightings of wild turkey, blue heron, turkey vulture, red tail hawk, pileated woodpecker, and the great horned owl. Due to the karst topography, reptiles and amphibians such as the box turtle, ring neck snake, red salamander and five-lined skink are also common.

== Demographics ==
Historical population
Census	Pop.	Note	%±
1940	146		—
1950	150		2.7%
1960	169		12.7%
1970	255		50.9%
1980	205		−19.6%
1990	177		−13.7%
2000	190		7.3%
2010	167		−12.1%
2020	175		4.8%
U.S. Decennial Census

As of the census of 2000, there were 190 people, 74 households, and 58 families residing in the city. The population density was 905.4 inhabitants per square mile (349.6/km^{2}). There were 82 housing units at an average density of 390.8 per square mile (150.9/km^{2}). The racial makeup of the city was 97.37% White, 1.05% Asian, and 1.58% from two or more races.

There were 74 households, out of which 29.7% had children under the age of 18 living with them, 77.0% were married couples living together, 2.7% had a female householder with no husband present, and 20.3% were non-families. 18.9% of all households were made up of individuals, and 16.2% had someone living alone who was 65 years of age or older. The average household size was 2.57 and the average family size was 2.95.

In the city, the population was spread out, with 25.8% under the age of 18, 2.1% from 18 to 24, 16.8% from 25 to 44, 31.6% from 45 to 64, and 23.7% who were 65 years of age or older. The median age was 49 years. For every 100 females, there were 90.0 males. For every 100 females age 18 and over, there were 78.5 males.

The median income for a household in the city was in excess of $200,000, as was the median income for a family. Males had a median income over $100,000 versus $14,375 for females. The per capita income for the city was $134,745. None of the families and none of the population were below the poverty line.

== Notable people ==
- Adeline Hoagland, painter
