= Brownsboro Village, Kentucky =

- City
- Location of Brownsboro Village in Jefferson County, Kentucky

- Location within the state of Kentucky Brownsboro Village (the United States)
- Coordinates: 38°15′47″N 85°39′57″W
- Country: United States
- State: Kentucky
- County: Jefferson

Area
  - Total: 0.073 sq mi (0.19 km^{2})
  - Land: 0.073 sq mi (0.19 km^{2})
  - Water: 0 sq mi (0.00 km^{2})
- Elevation: 571 ft (174 m)

Population (2020)
  - Total: 308
  - Density: 4,111.6/sq mi (1,587.48/km^{2})
- Time zone: UTC-5 (Eastern (EST))
  - Summer (DST): UTC-4 (EDT)
- ZIP Code: 40207
- FIPS code: 21-10198
- GNIS feature ID: 2403939
- Website: www.brownsborovillage.org

Brownsboro Village is a home rule-class city in Jefferson County, Kentucky, United States. As of the 2020 census, Brownsboro Village had a population of 308.

== Geography ==
Brownsboro Village is located in north-central Jefferson County. It is bordered by Indian Hills to the north, Druid Hills to the east, Bellewood to the southeast, St. Matthews to the south, and Louisville to the west. U.S. Route 42 (Brownsboro Road) forms the northern boundary of the city, leading southwest 5 miles (8 km) to downtown Louisville and northeast 7 miles (11 km) to Prospect.

According to the United States Census Bureau, Brownsboro Village has a total area of 0.07 square miles (0.19 km^{2}), all land.

== Demographics ==
Historical population
Census	Pop.	Note	%±
1960	598		—
1970	494		−17.4%
1980	410		−17.0%
1990	361		−12.0%
2000	318		−11.9%
2010	319		0.3%
2020	308		−3.4%
U.S. Decennial Census

As of the census of 2000, there were 318 people, 173 households, and 83 families residing in the city. The population density was 4,161.1 inhabitants per square mile (1,606.6/km^{2}). There were 187 housing units at an average density of 2,447.0 per square mile (944.8/km^{2}). The racial makeup of the city was 99.37% White, 0.31% Black or African American, and 0.31% from two or more races. Hispanic or Latino of any race were 0.63% of the population.

There were 173 households, out of which 13.9% had children under the age of 18 living with them, 38.7% were married couples living together, 5.2% had a female householder with no husband present, and 52.0% were non-families. 46.2% of all households were made up of individuals, and 13.9% had someone living alone who was 65 years of age or older. The average household size was 1.84 and the average family size was 2.59.

In the city, the population was spread out, with 13.8% under the age of 18, 3.8% from 18 to 24, 33.0% from 25 to 44, 27.0% from 45 to 64, and 22.3% who were 65 years of age or older. The median age was 45 years. For every 100 females, there were 81.7 males. For every 100 females age 18 and over, there were 80.3 males.

The median income for a household in the city was $64,375, and the median income for a family was $75,290. Males had a median income of $38,750 versus $40,250 for females. The per capita income for the city was $38,187. About 6.0% of families and 7.0% of the population were below the poverty line, including 10.9% of those under age 18 and 15.2% of those age 65 or over.
