= James Thompson House (Anchorage, Kentucky) =

Historic house in Kentucky, United States

- U.S. National Register of Historic Places
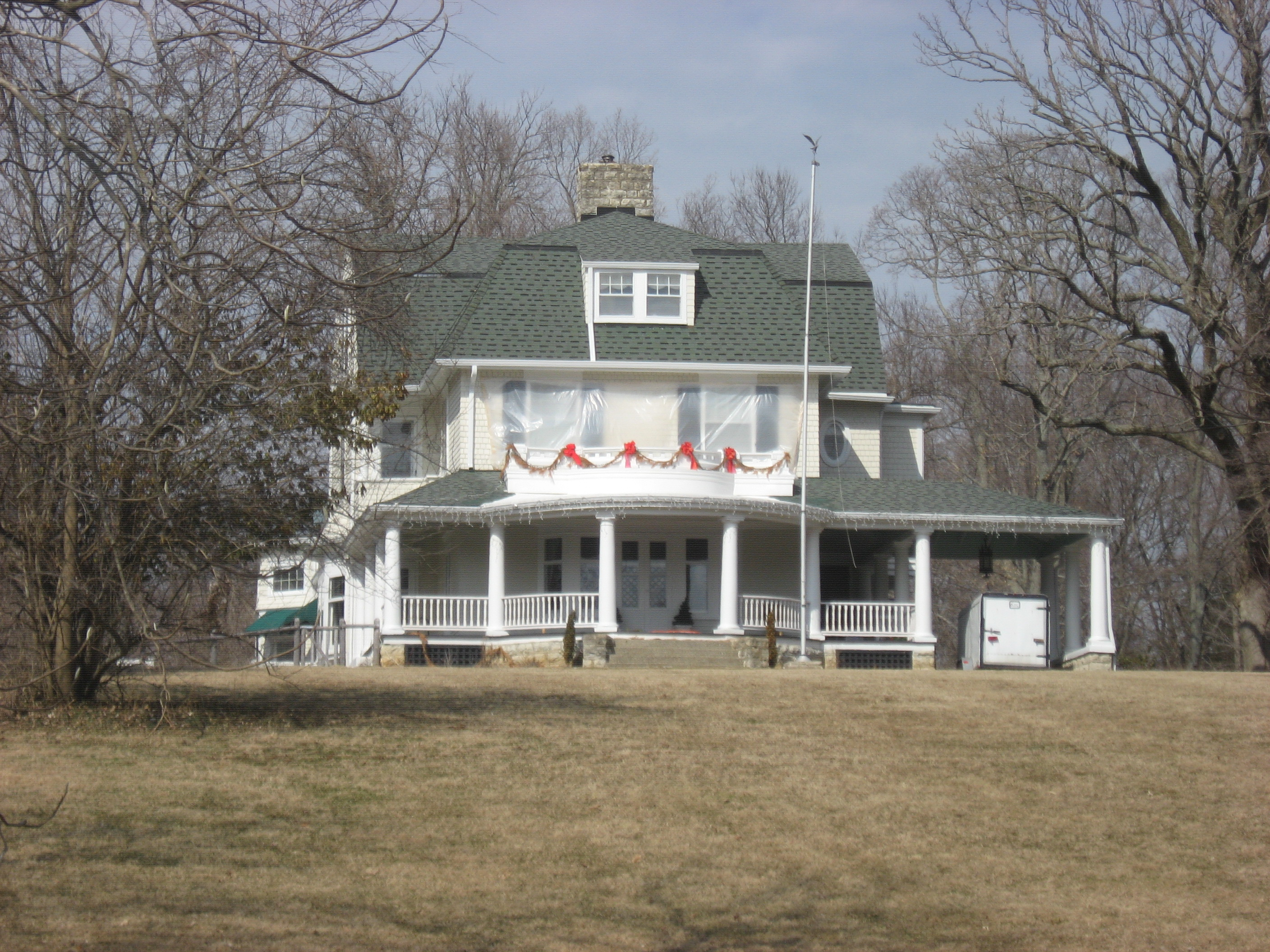
- Front with western side

- Location within Kentucky Location within the United States
- Location: 1400 Walnut Land, Anchorage, Kentucky
- Coordinates: 38°15′54″N 85°32′49″W
- Built: c.1894
- Built by: Wood, William B.
- Architect: Hutchings, E.T.
- Architectural style: Queen Anne, Shingle Style
- MPS: Jefferson County MRA
- NRHP reference No.: 80001570
- Added to NRHP: December 5, 1980

The James Thompson House in Anchorage, Kentucky, was built in about 1894. The house's architecture is eclectic, with elements of Shingle Style and Queen Anne style, and by tradition it has been believed to have been designed by E.T. Hutchings.

It is a wood-frame house on a limestone foundation, with a modified gambrel roof. Its front is asymmetrical and it has a porch around three sides of the house.

It was listed on the National Register of Historic Places in 1980.
