= Morris Burke Belknap (the elder) =

Morris Burke Belknap (June 25, 1780 -July 26, 1877) was an early iron foundry owner and American industrialist and "one of the pioneers in development of the iron industry west of the Allegheny Mountains." His son, W. B. Belknap, was founder of the Belknap Hardware and Manufacturing Company, having learned about the business from his father.

== Early life ==
Belknap was born in South Brimfield, Massachusetts on June 25, 1780, the only son of William Belknap.

== Business activities ==
Belknap moved in 1807 to a colony in Marietta, Ohio where he started an iron industry. In 1810 or 1811 he moved back East to Worcester, Massachusetts. In 1816 he moved to Pittsburgh, Pennsylvania, where he helped to build some of the first rolling mills and iron casting and iron forging companies. He traveled on horseback and by river boats, exploring the ore fields of the Tennessee and Cumberland rivers. and subsequently established iron furnaces in Stewart County, Tennessee and Nashville, Tennessee.

== Personal life ==
In 1824 Belknap married Phoebe Locke Thompson (1788-1873). W. B. Belknap, the oldest of Morris and Phoebe's six children, by following his father's chosen industrial manufacturing and retail career became the founder of Belknap Hardware and Manufacturing Company. in Louisville, Kentucky.

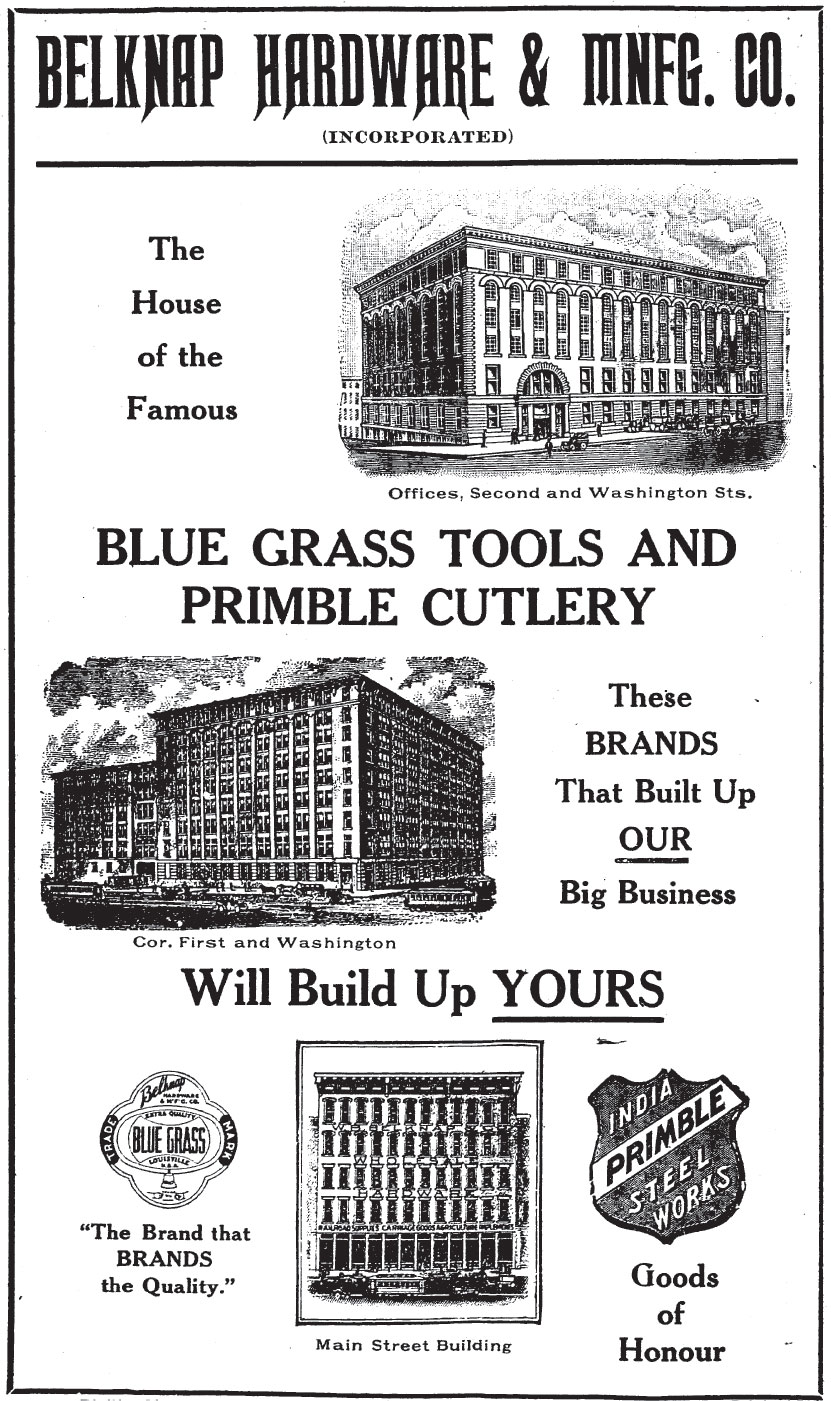
Belknap-ad

Phoebe Belknap died February 5, 1873, in DeWitt, Arkansas, and Morris died at Smithland, Livingston County, Kentucky on July 26, 1877. Kentucky historian E. Polk Johnson observed that Morris Burke Belknap's name "merits special prominence on the roster of those through whose constructive and initiative abilities encompassed the development of the great iron industry of the United States."
