= E.T. Hutchings =

American architect

Eusebius Theodore Hutchings (March 19, 1886 - November 30, 1958), commonly known as E. T. Hutchings, was an American architect in Louisville, Kentucky. Hutchings was born in Louisville in 1886. He attended Kentucky State University and Cornell University. He also studied architecture in Hanover, Germany. He was the son of an architect, John Bacon Hutchings (1859–1916), and in 1909, he began practicing as an architect with his father as John Bacon Hutchings & Sons. He served in France during World War I and was responsible for building the Sauvenay Hospital at Sauvenay, France. In 1919, he returned to his architectural practice in Louisville.

A number of their works are listed on the U.S. National Register of Historic Places.

Works include (with attribution):

- Harriet Funk House, 9316 Hurstbourne, Jeffersontown, Kentucky (Hutchings, E.T.), NRHP-listed
- Lyndon Cottage, Terminus of Hurstbourne Country Club Dr., Louisville, Kentucky (Hutchings, Eusebius Theodore), NRHP-listed
- Madrid Building, 545 S. 3rd St., Louisville, Kentucky (Hutchings, E.T.), NRHP-listed
- Midlands, 25 Poplar Hill Rd., Louisville, Kentucky (Hutchings E. T.), NRHP-listed
- James Thompson House, 1400 Walmut Land, Anchorage, Kentucky (Hutchings, E.T.), NRHP-listed
- George Woodard House, 232 W. Poplar St., Elizabethtown, Kentucky (Hutchings, E.T.), NRHP-listed
- Numerous works in Glenview Historic District (Louisville, Kentucky), NRHP-listed
- Rogers Clark Ballard Memorial School, 4200 Lime Kiln Ln., Louisville, Kentucky (Hutchings, John Bacon), NRHP-listed
- One or more works in Cannelton Historic District, roughly bounded by Richardson, Taylor, First, and Madison Sts., Cannelton, Indiana (Hutchings, John Bacon), NRHP-listed
