= William Burke Belknap =

American entrepreneur (1885–1965)

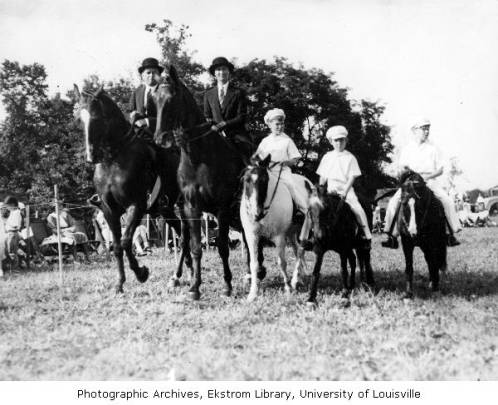
- Born: April 18, 1885; Louisville, Kentucky, United States
- Died: September 7, 1965 (aged 80)
- Occupations: Hardware manufacturer; horse and sheep breeder; economist; academician; politician
- Spouses: Helen Clark Strong (m. 1922; div. 1934) Edith Mary Clarke (m. 1937)
- Children: 3
- Father: William Richardson Belknap

William Burke Belknap the younger (1885–1965) was the son of William Richardson Belknap and Alice Trumbull Silliman. He was an entrepreneur in the family of William Burke Belknap, the elder (1811–1884), son of Morris Burke Belknap of Brimfield, Massachusetts, who was engaged in the iron furnace industry and died in 1873. The Belknaps were founders, inventors of patented merchandise, and owners of the Belknap Hardware and Manufacturing Company in Louisville, Kentucky. William Burke Belknap was an economist and a professor of economics at the University of Louisville. Leading up to and during World War II, he volunteered for service with the Red Cross in Ramsay and Plymouth, England. He was a trustee of Berea College and a graduate of Yale and Harvard. As a Kentucky legislator, he served two terms as a representative in the Kentucky General Assembly. He was the owner of Land O'Goshen Farms, where he bred and raised sheep and American saddlebred horses, and he was the president of F.C. Co-operative Milk Producers Association.

== Biography ==
William Burke Belknap (not to be confused with his son, William Burke Belknap, Jr.) was the son of William Richardson Belknap, for whom the William R. Belknap School in Louisville was named, and who was also former president and chairman of the board of Belknap Hardware and Manufacturing Company and original owner of the family mansion Lincliff. When William Richardson Belknap died in 1914, part of his estate was donated by his children William Burke Belknap and Eleanor Silliman Belknap Humphrey to help fund the purchase of the property at Third and Eastern Parkway for the University of Louisville's Belknap Campus. William Burke Belknap's mother, Alice Trumbull Silliman, was his father William Richardson Belknap's first wife. She was the daughter of Yale chemistry professor Benjamin Silliman, Jr. and Susan Huldah Forbes and granddaughter of Benjamin Silliman and Harriett Trumbull, a descendant of Connecticut Governor Jonathan Trumbull, Jr. In addition to their son, William Burke Belknap's parents had four daughters. Belknap's sisters were Eleanor Silliman Belknap Humphrey (1876–1964), Alice Silliman Belknap Hawkes (1878–1972), Mary Belknap Gray (1881–1974), and Christine Belknap Robinson (1890–1919).

William Burke Belknap was engaged in 1920 to Lucy Hewitt, granddaughter of Abram S. Hewitt, a U.S. Congressman and Mayor of New York. Lucy was also a great-granddaughter of Peter Cooper, a merchant and philanthropist. But a date was not set and she wed another.

William Burke Belknap was married on September 14, 1922, to Helen Clark Strong. In 1934 he filed for divorce asking for custody of their three young children, William Burke Belknap, Jr., Jonathan Trumbull Belknap, and Helen Belknap. Helen Strong counter-sued and on March 8, 1944, their financial settlement became part of a suit Belknap, et al. v. United States, in which Belknap's sheep-farming accounts, tax records, and divorce settlement were closely scrutinized. William Burke Belknap and his wife Edith Mary Clarke Belknap (whom he had married in 1937 in Hudson, Canada), initiated the suit in order to recover money paid in an inaccurate tax assessment, and the court granted the refund to the original plaintiffs, William Burke Belknap and his second wife Edith Clarke Belknap, who was born September 28, 1896, in Hudson Heights, Quebec. Edith, also known as "Aunt Edie" petitioned to become a naturalized citizen on July 10, 1942. She lived at Land O'Goshen farm with William Burke Belknap until his death and died March 24, 1983, in Oldham, Kentucky.

== Education ==
William Burke Belknap was a Phi Beta Kappa graduate of Yale, class of 1908, where he was an editor and contributor to the campus humor magazine The Yale Record, for which the logo and mascot was The Owl. When Punch stopped publication in 2002, The Yale Record became the oldest humor magazine in the world. William Burke Belknap was one of the "Old Owls," an honorary title given to former editors and board members of The Yale Record. He earned an M.A. from Harvard in 1915. He studied economics on the graduate level at Harvard and was a professor of economics at The University of Louisville.

== Land O'Goshen Farms ==
William Burke Belknap was the owner of Land O' Goshen Farms in Goshen, Kentucky, and a breeder of American Saddlebred horses. He was an early director of ASHBA (the American Saddle Horse Breeders Association), the forerunner of ASHA (the American Saddlebred Horse Association), of which he became president in 1958. In a notable lineage bred at Land O' Goshen were a top mare, Kalabara O'Goshen, who produced Ace O'Goshen and Gilded Gal O'Goshen. Gilded Gal O'Goshen was the dam of Gallant Guy O'Goshen. A filly in 1945 at Land O'Goshen, owned by William B. Belknap and managed by S.Y. Tupper, was Pre-War Stuff O'Goshen.

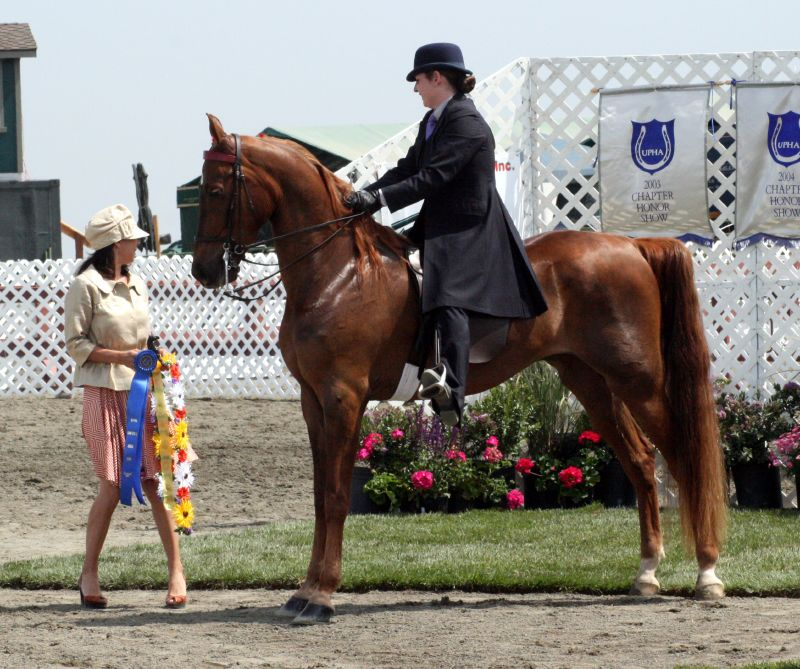
American Saddlebred

== Politics, religion and public life ==
Belknap was a Democrat, an Elder in the Presbyterian Church, and a member of the Kentucky House of Representatives (also known as the Kentucky General Assembly) from the 59th District, 1924–28 and 1934–35. He was a candidate for U.S. Congress as a Representative from Kentucky in 1933. He was president of the American Legislators Association and presided at a meeting in 1933 when United States President Herbert Hoover gave the opening address. He was a member of the Pendennis Club of Louisville, a men's club originally housed in another former Belknap family mansion, and of Zeta Psi fraternity.

In 1993 the landmark building of his family's former Belknap Hardware and Manufacturing Company was imploded and filmed as promotional advertising for the movie Demolition Man.

At least three newspaper photos of William Burke Belknap, including one on horseback at Land O' Goshen, are available at various locations and are probably in the common domain.
