= Adeline Hoagland =

American painter (1930–2025)

- Born: Adeline Van Court Andrews; September 8, 1930
- Died: June 24, 2025 (aged 94)
- Occupation: Painter

Adeline Hoagland (September 8, 1930 – June 24, 2025) was an American painter in the 21st century known for her portraits and genre painting, often featuring women or children in natural settings. Beginning in 1964, she resided and created art in affluent Mockingbird Valley near Louisville, Kentucky. Hoagland began as a watercolorist and began painting with oils in the early 1980s. Her work has been exhibited around the region and is in the permanent collections of institutions including the Hunter Museum of American Art.

Hoagland died on June 24, 2025, at the age of 94.

== Works ==
Dozens of Hoagland's works were auctioned in two estate auctions in early 2023 conducted by Louisville, KY based auction house Wardlow Auctions.
