= Riverwood, Kentucky =

- City
- Location of Riverwood in Jefferson County, Kentucky

- Location within the state of Kentucky Riverwood (the United States)
- Coordinates: 38°16′59″N 85°39′41″W
- Country: United States
- State: Kentucky
- County: Jefferson

Area
  - Total: 0.21 sq mi (0.54 km^{2})
  - Land: 0.21 sq mi (0.54 km^{2})
  - Water: 0 sq mi (0.00 km^{2})
- Elevation: 561 ft (171 m)

Population (2020)
  - Total: 492
  - Density: 2,364.1/sq mi (912.77/km^{2})
- Time zone: UTC-5 (Eastern (EST))
  - Summer (DST): UTC-4 (EDT)
- ZIP Code: 40207
- FIPS code: 21-65766
- GNIS feature ID: 2404625
- Website: www.riverwoodky.org

Riverwood is a home rule-class city in northeastern Jefferson County, Kentucky, United States. As of the 2020 census, Riverwood had a population of 492.

== Geography ==
Riverwood is located in northern Jefferson County. It is bordered to the west, south, and east by the city of Indian Hills, and to the north by consolidated Louisville/Jefferson County. Downtown Louisville is 7 miles (11 km) to the southwest.

According to the United States Census Bureau, Riverwood has a total area of 0.21 square miles (0.54 km^{2}), all land.

== History ==
Riverwood incorporated on November 11, 1969. In 1998, Riverwood residents rejected a ballot initiative to merge into the city of Indian Hills along with three other small cities. Riverwood was the only city whose tax rate was projected to increase if the merger took effect. The other cities merged the following year with Riverwood off the ballot.

== Demographics ==
Historical population
| Census | Pop. | Note | %± |
|---|---|---|---|
| 1970 | 515 | | — |
| 1980 | 435 | | −15.5% |
| 1990 | 506 | | 16.3% |
| 2000 | 469 | | −7.3% |
| 2010 | 446 | | −4.9% |
| 2020 | 492 | | 10.3% |
U.S. Decennial Census

As of the census of 2000, there were 469 people, 177 households, and 149 families residing in the city. The population density was 2,278.2 inhabitants per square mile (879.6/km^{2}). There were 183 housing units at an average density of 889.0 per square mile (343.2/km^{2}). The racial makeup of the city was 98.93% White, 0.21% African American, 0.64% Asian, and 0.21% from two or more races. Hispanic or Latino of any race were 0.43% of the population.

There were 177 households, out of which 38.4% had children under the age of 18 living with them, 80.2% were married couples living together, 4.0% had a female householder with no husband present, and 15.3% were non-families. 14.7% of all households were made up of individuals, and 6.8% had someone living alone who was 65 years of age or older. The average household size was 2.65 and the average family size was 2.92.

In the city, the population was spread out, with 26.4% under the age of 18, 3.8% from 18 to 24, 20.3% from 25 to 44, 32.4% from 45 to 64, and 17.1% who were 65 years of age or older. The median age was 45 years. For every 100 females, there were 95.4 males. For every 100 females age 18 and over, there were 94.9 males.

The median income for a household in the city was $107,552, and the median income for a family was $114,493. Males had a median income of $83,493 versus $48,750 for females. The per capita income for the city was $53,783. About 1.3% of families and 1.8% of the population were below the poverty line, including 1.9% of those under age 18 and none of those age 65 or over.
