= Midlands (Louisville, Kentucky) =

Historic house in Kentucky, United States

- U.S. National Register of Historic Places
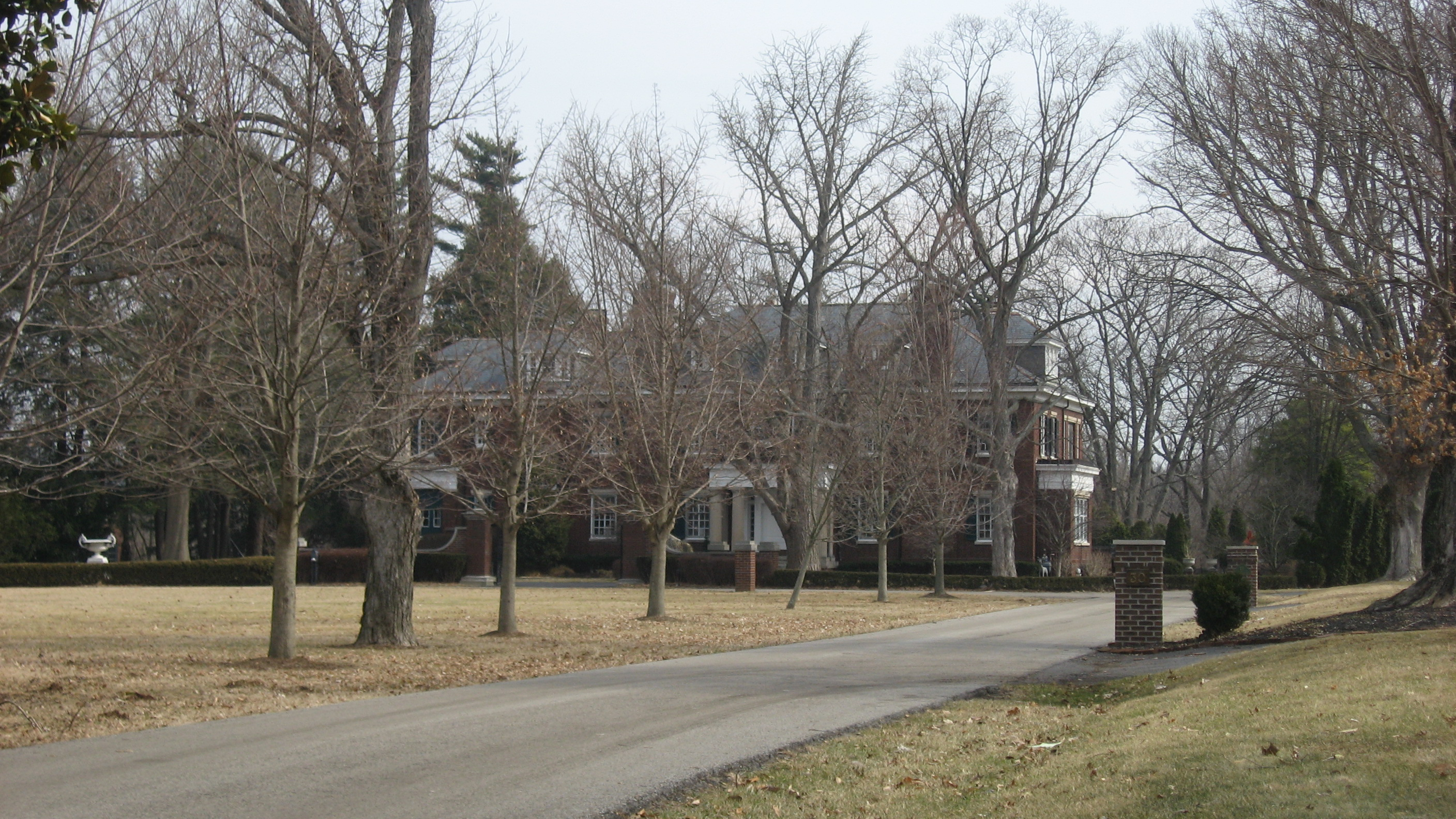
- Western side and front

- Location within Kentucky Location within the United States
- Location: 25 Poplar Hill Rd., Louisville, Kentucky
- Coordinates: 38°17′33″N 85°39′44″W
- Area: 6.2 acres (2.5 ha)
- Built: 1914
- Architect: E. T.Hutchings
- Architectural style: Colonial Revival, Georgian-Revival
- MPS: Jefferson County MRA
- NRHP reference No.: 83002706
- Added to NRHP: August 16, 1983

The Midlands is a private house in Indian Hills, Kentucky in suburban Louisville built 1913–1914; it is listed on the American National Register of Historic Places. It was built for Marion Dumont Belknap, who was the widow of Louisville businessman Morris B. Belknap, who had died in 1910. It was designed by the Louisville firm of E.T. Hutchings.

It was listed on the National Register in 1983. The listing included two contributing buildings on 6.2 acres (2.5 ha).
