= Druid Hills, Kentucky =

- City
- Location of Druid Hills in Jefferson County, Kentucky

- Location within the state of Kentucky Druid Hills (the United States)
- Coordinates: 38°15′54″N 85°39′42″W
- Country: United States
- State: Kentucky
- County: Jefferson

Area
  - Total: 0.089 sq mi (0.23 km^{2})
  - Land: 0.089 sq mi (0.23 km^{2})
  - Water: 0 sq mi (0.00 km^{2})
- Elevation: 554 ft (169 m)

Population (2020)
  - Total: 299
  - Density: 3,361.1/sq mi (1,297.71/km^{2})
- Time zone: UTC-5 (Eastern (EST))
  - Summer (DST): UTC-4 (EDT)
- ZIP Code: 40207
- FIPS code: 21-22474
- GNIS feature ID: 2403509
- Website: druidhillsky.gov

Druid Hills is a home rule-class city in Jefferson County, Kentucky, United States. As of the 2020 census, Druid Hills had a population of 299. It was incorporated in 1950.

== Geography ==
Druid Hills is located in northern Jefferson County. It is bordered to the north by Indian Hills, to the east by Louisville, to the south by Bellewood, and to the west by Brownsboro Village. U.S. Route 42 (Brownsboro Road) forms the northern border of Druid Hills, leading west 5 miles (8 km) to downtown Louisville.

According to the United States Census Bureau, Druid Hills has a total area of 0.09 square miles (0.23 km^{2}), all land.

== Demographics ==
Historical population
Census	Pop.	Note	%±
1960	444		—
1970	416		−6.3%
1980	338		−18.7%
1990	305		−9.8%
2000	318		4.3%
2010	308		−3.1%
2020	299		−2.9%
U.S. Decennial Census

As of the census of 2000, there were 318 people, 139 households, and 89 families residing in the city. The population density was 3,752.4 inhabitants per square mile (1,448.8/km^{2}). There were 141 housing units at an average density of 1,663.8 per square mile (642.4/km^{2}). The racial makeup of the city was 99.69% White and 0.31% Asian. Hispanic or Latino of any race were 0.31% of the population.

There were 139 households, out of which 31.7% had children under the age of 18 living with them, 54.0% were married couples living together, 7.9% had a female householder with no husband present, and 35.3% were non-families. 33.1% of all households were made up of individuals, and 18.0% had someone living alone who was 65 years of age or older. The average household size was 2.29 and the average family size was 2.96.

In the city, the population was spread out, with 26.1% under the age of 18, 3.5% from 18 to 24, 27.7% from 25 to 44, 22.3% from 45 to 64, and 20.4% who were 65 years of age or older. The median age was 41 years. For every 100 females, there were 71.9 males. For every 100 females age 18 and over, there were 75.4 males.

The median income for a household in the city was $66,875, and the median income for a family was $83,698. Males had a median income of $68,750 versus $46,250 for females. The per capita income for the city was $41,213. None of the population or families were below the poverty line.
