= William R. Belknap School =

- Belknap, William R., School
- U.S. National Register of Historic Places
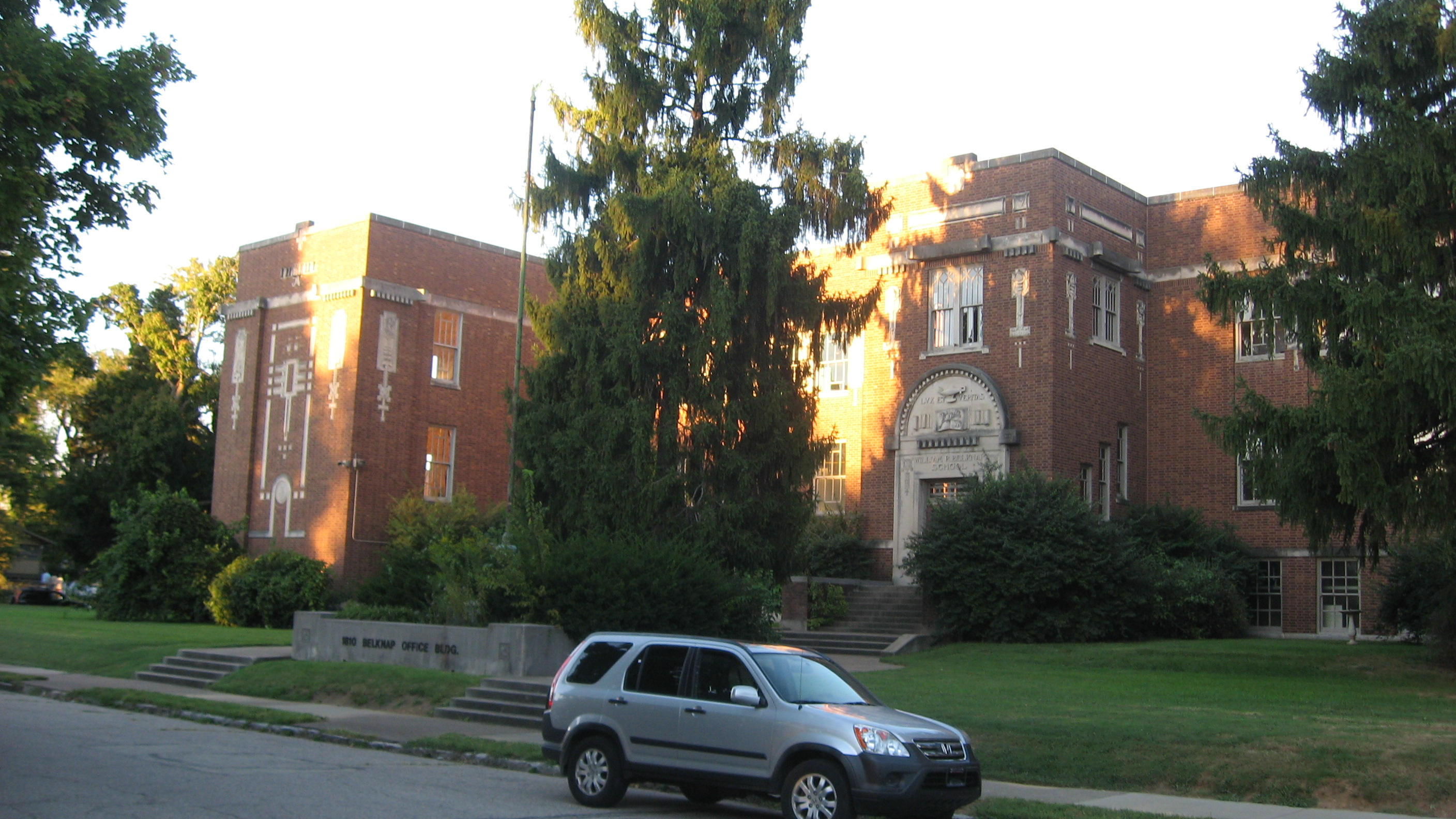
- Front of the school

- Location within Kentucky Location within the United States
- Location: 1800 Sils Ave., Louisville, Kentucky
- Coordinates: 38°13′19″N 85°41′23″W
- Built: 1916
- Architect: Earl J. Henry
- Architectural style: Mixed (more than 2 styles from different periods)
- NRHP reference No.: 82002706
- Added to NRHP: August 12, 1982

The William R. Belknap School is a former school building in the Belknap neighborhood of Louisville, Kentucky United States. It was added to the National Register of Historic Places in 1982. It was designated as a local landmark by the Louisville Metro Landmarks Commission in 2001.

The school takes its name from the developer of the surrounding neighborhood. In 1995, the Belknap neighborhood association took a geometric motif from the school building for its logo.

== Description ==
The building and its grounds originally took up an entire 2.15-acre (8,700 m^{2}) city block. The building has about 30,000 square feet (2,800 m^{2}) of indoor space.

The Belknap School is a two-story building on a raised basement. The building has a central projecting entry bay and projecting end wings. The central projecting entrance contains double doors with a single transom. The panes have geometric mullions. This entrance is encased in a stone surround with an arched tympanum lined with exaggerated dentils. Within the tympanum is a central lamp with the words "LUX ET VERITAS, light and truth," above an open book with a fig branch. In the lintel is a band of exaggerated dentils. In the stone surround; the school name, WILLIAM R. BELKNAP SCHOOL, is located above the doors, flanked by applied decorative terra cotta motifs.

On the second floor is a pair of windows with vertical mullions in both sash, and crosshatch mullions in the upper portion of the upper sash. Flanking the windows are applied, terra cotta torch motifs. The inside walls of this projecting bay contain three stepped windows on the first level and paired windows on the second with the flanking torch motifs. The fenestration of the recessed façade plane which flanks the entrance bay consists of five basement-story windows and five windows on both the first and second floors.

The basement-story windows have six-over-six lights. A stone band divides the basement-story from the first floor. The first and second floor windows contain unusually patterned geometric lights. Pilasters rise from the sill of the first floor windows to the lintels of the second floor windows, with tapestry-like terra cotta panels on the pilasters between the second: floor windows. A stone band divides the second floor from the large parapet wall with a stone coping.

On the inside walls of each wing are three basement-story windows and two first and second floor windows with the same mullion patterns found on the recessed front façade windows. Applied tapestry-like panels are found on the second floor. The ends of the wings contain no fenestration and are the most decorative planes of the structure. The same tapestry-like panels found on the other façade planes are also located here, on both sides of a central, slightly recessed plane which contains banding and brickwork which comprise another tapestry-like design. The stone band which divides the basement-story from the first floor is interrupted by an elongated arch with a medallion containing an old city of Louisville emblem.

On every outside corner of the building at the parapet level is a band of exaggerated dentils with projecting ends. On the right side of the building is an entrance for the boys and on the left side is an entrance for the girls. The entrance is within a stone surround with the tapestry-like applied motifs on each side of the entrance. The name BOYS and GIRLS is located in the lintel. There are small paired windows above the entrance and another larger pair on the second level. The rest of the fenestration on the side walls of the building is the same as that found on the front. The windows on the rear of the building have nine-over-nine lights.

The polygonal smokestack contains some of the same decorative elements found on the school building. Every door knob on the interior is a bust of William R. Belknap. In 2000 a cellular antennae was added atop the smokestack, but was quickly altered to hide the antennae within the smokestack after neighbors complained.

It is not clear what material was used in the surrounds and applied motifs and banding on this building. It is terra cotta, stone or cement - most likely a combination of all three. Assumptions were made as to the material used in the context of the description. If and when terra cotta was used, it is unglazed.

== Architecture ==
The Belknap School is an example in Louisville of the eclectic styles of the early twentieth century. The craftsmanship displayed in the terra cotta ornamentation on the building's exterior make it one of the city's finest examples of Sullivanesque detailing.

The Belknap School was designed in an eclectic style. The plan is typical of the new Elizabethan style schools of the period, but the decorative elements are both classical and Sullivanesque. The main entrance is an example of the combination of the decorative motifs. Exaggerated dentils line the arched panel above the double doors. This panel also contains a lamp, symbolic of enlightenment, hope, window and truth, an open book, symbolic of intellectual attainment, and a fig branch from the tree of knowledge. The remaining elements are stylized foliate patterns, typical of Sullivanesque detailing.

The projecting end wings of the building also contain geometric and foliate stylized panels, described in a 1916 article from The Courier-Journal as tapestries.

== History ==
The William R. Belknap School, named for William Richardson Belknap, was the last of seven schools built with a local bond issue from 1914 to 1916. J. Earl Henry was architect for schools and also designed Louisville Male High School and Brandeis Elementary School, both of which are also on the National Register of Historic Places.

Henry was in partnership with Brinton B. Davis before becoming school architect, and assisted Davis in the plans for the Broadway School. Henry is known particularly for his use of classical and mythical symbolism, as well as his ingenuous eclectic designs. The Belknap School remained a neighborhood school until 1978 when it was closed.

Jefferson County Public Schools sold the building to a private company which reopened the school building as office space in 1983. A portion was used by the Christian Academy of Louisville from 1994 to 1998. Vineyard Christian Church held services in the building in 2002 until 2006.

In 2006, the school building was converted into 20 condominium units. As a part of the plant, a new condo building was built on the school lot just south of the original building. The new building was built to roughly resemble the original building and have a similar footprint.
