= Glenview Manor, Kentucky =

- City
- Location of Glenview Manor in Jefferson County, Kentucky

- Location within the state of Kentucky Glenview Manor (the United States)
- Coordinates: 38°17′27″N 85°38′00″W
- Country: United States
- State: Kentucky
- County: Jefferson
- Named for: Glenview, Kentucky

Area
  - Total: 0.085 sq mi (0.22 km^{2})
  - Land: 0.085 sq mi (0.22 km^{2})
  - Water: 0 sq mi (0.00 km^{2})
- Elevation: 591 ft (180 m)

Population (2020)
  - Total: 206
  - Density: 2,402/sq mi (927.3/km^{2})
- Time zone: UTC-5 (Eastern (EST))
  - Summer (DST): UTC-4 (EDT)
- ZIP Code: 40222
- FIPS code: 21-31420
- GNIS feature ID: 2403706

Glenview Manor is a home rule-class city in Jefferson County, Kentucky, United States. As of the 2020 census, Glenview Manor had a population of 206.

Glenview Manor was named for the nearby community of Glenview, although Glenview Manor was formally incorporated in 1965, two decades before the original town received similar recognition.

== Geography ==
Glenview Manor is located in northern Jefferson County. It is bordered to the south and west by Northfield and to the north and east by consolidated Louisville/Jefferson County. The city is 8 miles (13 km) northeast of downtown Louisville.

According to the United States Census Bureau, Glenview Manor has a total area of 0.085 square miles (0.22 km^{2}), all land.

== Demographics ==
Historical population
Census	Pop.	Note	%±
1970	170		—
1980	212		24.7%
1990	197		−7.1%
2000	191		−3.0%
2010	191		0.0%
2020	206		7.9%
U.S. Decennial Census

As of the census of 2020, there were 206 people, 79 households, and 62 families residing in the city. The population density was 1,842.0 inhabitants per square mile (711.2/km^{2}). There were 84 housing units at an average density of 810.1 per square mile (312.8/km^{2}). The racial makeup of the city was 97.91% White and 2.09% Asian.

There were 79 households, out of which 31.6% had children under the age of 18 living with them, 78.5% were married couples living together, and 20.3% were non-families. 19.0% of all households were made up of individuals, and 11.4% had someone living alone who was 65 years of age or older. The average household size was 2.42 and the average family size was 2.75.

In the city, the population was spread out, with 21.5% under the age of 18, 2.1% from 18 to 24, 18.8% from 25 to 44, 26.2% from 45 to 64, and 31.4% who were 65 years of age or older. The median age was 49 years. For every 100 females, there were 94.9 males. For every 100 females age 18 and over, there were 87.5 males.

The median income for a household in the city was $98,832, and the median income for a family was $103,501. Males had a median income of $87,351 versus $32,500 for females. The per capita income for the city was $43,382. About 4.8% of families and 3.9% of the population were below the poverty line, including none of those under the age of eighteen and 8.5% of those 65 or over.
