= Glenview, Kentucky =

- City
- Location of Glenview in Jefferson County, Kentucky

- Location within the state of Kentucky Glenview (the United States)
- Coordinates: 38°18′07″N 85°39′06″W
- Country: United States
- State: Kentucky
- County: Jefferson
- Named for: Glen View, a former horse farm

Area
  - Total: 1.43 sq mi (3.71 km^{2})
  - Land: 1.42 sq mi (3.69 km^{2})
  - Water: 0.0077 sq mi (0.02 km^{2})
- Elevation: 545 ft (166 m)

Population (2020)
  - Total: 596
  - Density: 418/sq mi (161.5/km^{2})
- Time zone: UTC-5 (Eastern (EST))
  - Summer (DST): UTC-4 (EDT)
- ZIP code: 40025
- Area code: 502
- FIPS code: 21-31348
- GNIS feature ID: 2403704
- Website: www.glenviewky.gov
- Glenview Historic District
- U.S. National Register of Historic Places
- U.S. Historic district
- Location within Kentucky Location within the United States
- Location: Glenview Ave., Louisville, Kentucky
- Area: 80 acres (32 ha)
- Architect: Multiple
- Architectural style: Late 19th And 20th Century Revivals
- MPS: Jefferson County MRA
- NRHP reference No.: 83002673
- Added to NRHP: August 16, 1983

Glenview is a 6th-class city along the southern bank of the Ohio River in northeastern Jefferson County, Kentucky, United States. As of the 2020 census, Glenview had a population of 596.

Glenview has the 2nd-highest per capita income within Kentucky and the 74th-highest in the United States. The city is known for its old estate homes on high bluffs overlooking the Ohio River.

== History ==
5,000 acres (20 km^{2}) of the surrounding land were originally owned by James Smalley Bate and named "Berry Hill" for his former Virginia home. The estate was purchased in 1868 by meat packer James C. McFerran. McFerran's horse farm was named "Glen View". After his death in 1885, John E. Green acquired the farm and renamed it "Glenview Stock Farm". The community received its post office on May 11, 1893.

In the late 19th century, wealthy families from Louisville began moving east to build summer homes in communities such as Anchorage. Some of these eventually became full-time residences. Early residents of Glenview cooperated with other communities to open the Louisville, Harrods Creek and Westport Railroad in 1877, a commuter rail line in use until its abandonment in the 1950s. Some of Louisville's most influential families, including the Binghams, the Ballards, and the Belknaps, moved into the area after the opening of the railroad.

Many houses are part of the Glenview Historic District. Several buildings are individually listed on the National Register of Historic Places including the Ballard School, Boxhill and Lincliff.

Some developers have played off Glenview's reputation, establishing similarly named communities at Glenview Manor and Glenview Hills in the 1960s and 70s. Louisville attempted to annex Glenview in 1983, which prompted its residents to seek a separate incorporation from the state legislature. This was granted in 1985. Many of the houses are part of the Glenview Historic District, which is on the National Register of Historic Places.

== Geography ==
Glenview is located in northern Jefferson County. It is bordered to the northwest by the Ohio River, to the southwest by Indian Hills, and on all other sides by consolidated Louisville/Jefferson County. Interstate 71 runs along the southern edge of the community, but with no direct access. Downtown Louisville is 7 miles (11 km) to the southwest via River Road.

According to the United States Census Bureau, Glenview has a total area of 1.4 square miles (3.7 km^{2}), of which 0.01 square miles (0.02 km^{2}), or 0.43%, are water.

== Demographics ==
Historical population
Census	Pop.	Note	%±
1990	653		—
2000	558		−14.5%
2010	531		−4.8%
2020	596		12.2%
U.S. Decennial Census

As of the census of 2000, there were 558 people, 214 households, and 181 families residing in the city. The population density was 386.3 inhabitants per square mile (149.2/km^{2}). There were 232 housing units at an average density of 160.6 per square mile (62.0/km^{2}). The racial makeup of the city was 96.24% White, 0.18% Native American, 2.69% Asian, 0.18% Pacific Islander, 0.72% from other races. Hispanic or Latino of any race were 1.08% of the population.

There were 214 households, out of which 34.1% had children under the age of 18 living with them, 81.8% were married couples living together, 2.3% had a female householder with no husband present, and 15.0% were non-families. 13.1% of all households were made up of individuals, and 6.5% had someone living alone who was 65 years of age or older. The average household size was 2.61 and the average family size was 2.84.

In the city, the population was spread out, with 22.4% under the age of 18, 5.2% from 18 to 24, 13.3% from 25 to 44, 42.5% from 45 to 64, and 16.7% who were 65 years of age or older. The median age was 48 years. For every 100 females, there were 97.2 males. For every 100 females age 18 and over, there were 94.2 males.

The median income for a household in the city was $161,571, and the median income for a family was $183,800. Males had a median income of $100,000 versus $46,250 for females. The per capita income for the city was $85,094. About 3.3% of families and 4.2% of the population were below the poverty line, including 6.5% of those under age 18 and none of those age 65 or over.

== See also ==
- List of cities and towns along the Ohio River
