= W. B. Belknap =

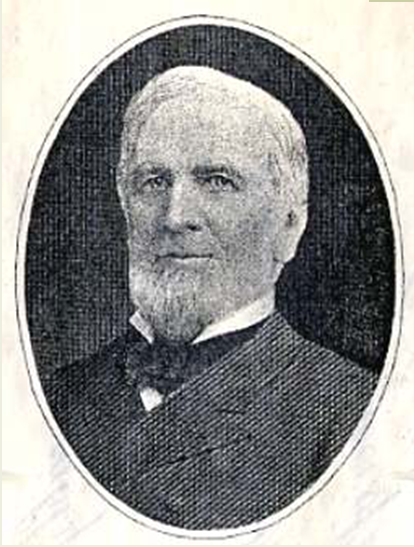
- Born: 1811; Brimfield, Massachusetts, U.S.
- Died: 1889 (aged 77–78); Jefferson County, Kentucky, U.S.
- Resting place: Cave Hill Cemetery; Louisville, Kentucky, U.S.
- Occupations: Founding owner, Belknap Hardware and Manufacturing Company
- Spouse: Mary Richardson (m. 1843)
- Children: 5, including William and Morris
- Parent: Morris Burke Belknap, the elder

W. B. Belknap, also known as William Burke Belknap (the elder) (1811–1889), not to be confused with his grandson William Burke Belknap (the younger) (1885–1965) or great-grandson William Burke Belknap Jr. (1893–1952), was the founder of W .B. Belknap and Company, an early iron and nail business at Third and Main Street in downtown Louisville, Kentucky, which evolved by 1840 into the mammoth Belknap Hardware and Manufacturing Company. He was born in Brimfield, Massachusetts, where he spent his early years helping his father Morris Burke Belknap (the elder) (1780–1877) in an iron furnace foundry business.

== Origins of Belknap Hardware and Manufacturing ==
W. B. traveled to Pittsburgh, East Tennessee, St. Louis, and Cincinnati before settling his hardware business on the banks of the Ohio River in Louisville. He became a prominent Kentucky citizen and businessman who hosted Ulysses S. Grant and William T. Sherman in his home during the American Civil War.

== Kentucky family ==
William Burke Belknap, the elder, was the oldest of six children and the only son of Morris Burke Belknap (the elder), and Phoebe Locke Thompson (1788–1873). In 1843 he married Mary Richardson, daughter of William Richardson, President of the North Kentucky Bank. He was the father of three daughters, Frances "Fanny," Caroline, and Lucy, and of two sons, William Richardson Belknap and Morris Burke Belknap (the younger). His son Morris was also known as Colonel Morris Burke Belknap and married Lily Buckner (1858 -1893), the granddaughter of Simon Bolivar Buckner, the 30th Governor of Kentucky. He was the grandfather of Eleanor Silliman Belknap Humphrey. He is buried at Cave Hill Cemetery in Louisville.

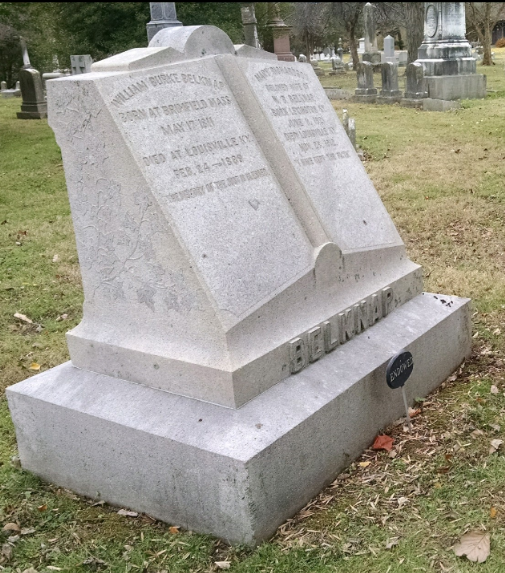
2017-11-10 1435 tombstone of William Burke Belknap, the elder, and wife Mary in Cave Hill Cemetery

During the period of the American Civil War, William Burke Belknap owned and resided in a house subsequently occupied by the Pendennis Club.

W. B.'s son Morris Burke Belknap (the younger) (1856–1910), and Lily Buckner Belknap were the grandparents of the Belknap/Moorman twins, Charles H. Moorman Jr. and Morris Burke Moorman, the only children of their only daughter, also named Lily, and Judge Charles Harwood Moorman Sr. The twins were both born on February 25, 1925, and both were killed in action while serving in the U.S. Army in 1944 during the World War II defense of Normandy, France, thus leaving Lily a widow with no living children or parents.

== Progeny ==
William Burke Belknap (the elder) was the grandfather of Alice Belknap Hawkes, Eleanor Belknap Humphrey, William Burke Belknap, the younger, Mary Belknap Gray, and Christine Belknap Robinson. He was the great-grandfather of Dr. Edward Cornelius Humphrey and Alice Humphrey (who married Gerald D. Morgan). He was the great-great-grandfather of economist Thomas MacGillivray Humphrey and of Barbara Morgan Meade, a founder and former co-owner of Politics and Prose book store in Chevy Chase, Washington, D.C.

W. B. Belknap, also known as William Burke Belknap (the elder), was the great-great-grandfather of John Lawrance Hawkes, who edited and published in 2000 the journal of Joel Root, Hawkes' ancestor who kept a log of his journey around the world on a sailing ship seal hunting expedition which departed from New Haven, Connecticut on September 1, 1802.
