= Morris B. Belknap =

Businessman and politician

Morris Belknap
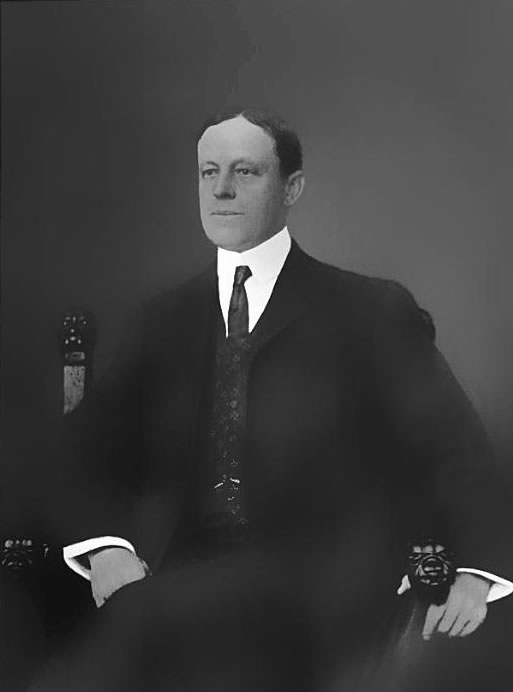
- Portrait, before 1910
- Born: Morris Burke Belknap; June 7, 1856; Louisville, Kentucky, US
- Died: April 13, 1910 (aged 53); Lexington, Kentucky
- Resting place: Cave Hill Cemetery
- Education: Yale University
- Occupation: Businessman
- Known for: Vice-president of Belknap Hardware and Manufacturing Company; nominee for governor of Kentucky
- Political party: Republican
- Spouses: Lily Buckner (m. 1883; died 1893) Marion S. Dumont (m. 1900)
- Children: 4
- Parents: William Burke Belknap; Mary Richardson
- Relatives: Simon Bolivar Buckner (father-in-law)

Morris Burke Belknap (June 7, 1856 – April 13, 1910), also known as Colonel Morris Burke Belknap, was an American businessman from Louisville, Kentucky.

After earning a degree from Yale University in 1877, Belknap worked at his father's hardware company. Later, he co-founded an agricultural implement company. In 1883, he married Lily Buckner, with whom he fathered four children. Following the death of his father, Belknap became vice-president of his hardware company, a position which he held for the rest of his life. Buckner died in 1893, and he married Marion S. Dumont in 1900.

In addition to his business career, Belknap served in the Kentucky State Guard, eventually rising to the rank of lieutenant colonel. In 1898, during the Spanish–American War, he served briefly in Puerto Rico prior to the end of hostilities. He was promoted to colonel before his honorable discharge in 1899.

Belknap was the Republican nominee for governor of Kentucky in the 1903 gubernatorial election. He campaigned on his business experience and opposition to policies of the incumbent governor, J. C. W. Beckham, whom Belknap lost the election to. Afterward, Belknap spent his later life involved in a variety of civil and religious organizations. In 1910, he died of pernicious anemia, a condition which is believed to have been worsened by a mysterious ailment he contracted while in Puerto Rico.

== Early life and family ==
Belknap was born at his parents' home in Louisville, Kentucky, on June 7, 1856. He was the youngest child of William Burke and Mary (Richardson) Belknap. Until the age of 17, he was educated in the private school of Benjamin B. Huntoon. In 1873 he and his brother, William Richardson Belknap (1849–1914), spent a year traveling in Europe. On his return, he enrolled in the Sheffield Scientific School of Yale University. He earned his degree in 1877, but spent an additional year of postgraduate study in chemistry.

Returning to Louisville in 1879, Belknap worked for his father's hardware company, W. B. Belknap and Company, for a short time before partnering with Thomas Miekle and Barry Coleman to form Thomas Miekle and Company, an agricultural implement manufacturer. He returned to Belknap and Company in 1883 as a secretary.

On June 14, 1883, Belknap married Lily Buckner, the daughter of Confederate general Simon Bolivar Buckner. The couple had four children – Gertrude, Walter Kingsbury, Lily, and Morris Jr. Lily Belknap died in 1893. After her death, Belknap constructed a stone bridge – dubbed Belknap Bridge – in Louisville's Cherokee Park in her honor.

Belknap's father died in 1889, and after incorporating his company as Belknap Hardware and Manufacturing Company, Morris Belknap became the company's vice-president, a position he held for the remainder of his life. He was the youngest person elected president of the Louisville Board of Trade, and he held that position for many years.

== Military service ==
In 1879, Belknap enlisted as a private in the First Infantry Regiment of the Kentucky State Guard, known as the Louisville Legion. His father-in-law was elected governor of Kentucky in 1887 and appointed Belknap to his military staff with the rank of colonel. In 1890, he was elected captain of Company A of the First Regiment in the State Guard, and in 1893, he was chosen as the unit's lieutenant colonel.

At the commencement of the Spanish–American War, governor William O'Connell Bradley called up Belknap's unit for service. He was mustered into federal service on May 13, 1898, and departed the same day, spending several weeks at Lexington, Kentucky, before arriving at Newport News, Virginia, on July 28, 1898. On August 1, general Frederick Dent Grant ordered six companies under Belknap to board the USRC Hudson bound for Puerto Rico. Arriving at Ponce on August 11, the men were forwarded to Mayagüez, and were ordered to follow the 11th Infantry Regiment inland as soon as transport could be secured.

After hostilities had ceased. Belknap and his men remained at Mayagüez until August 26, then returned to Ponce, reuniting with the regiment on August 29 and 30. Upon Castleman's elevation to brigadier general, Belknap was promoted to colonel and given command of the First Kentucky. The unit returned to Louisville on December 12, 1898; Belknap was honorably discharged on February 24, 1899. He saw no active service.

On July 16, 1900, Belknap married Marion S. Dumont of Plainfield, New Jersey.

== Gubernatorial campaign ==
At the 1903 Republican state convention, party leaders including W. Godfrey Hunter supported Belknap as the party's gubernatorial nominee. Former governor Bradley, however, supported a fellow Louisvillian, attorney Augustus E. Willson. When a pro-Willson delegation was unseated by a challenge, Willson withdrew and Bradley bolted the convention. Consequently, Belknap was chosen as the party's nominee on the first ballot. Former Democratic governor Buckner supported his son-in-law's candidacy.

Belknap touted his business management experience, contrasting it with charges that his opponent, incumbent governor J. C. W. Beckham, had mismanaged the state's eleemosynary institutions. Belknap lacked name recognition outside Louisville. He was a poor public speaker, and he was unable to make the race truly competitive. The New York Times reported, "Col. Morris B. Belknap, the Republican nominee for Governor of Kentucky, is an athlete as well as a politician and a millionaire businessman. Election day was a rowdy one throughout the state, and a judge supporting Belknap was shot by a sheriff at a polling place in Louisville. Victory went to Belknap's opponent; Beckham won the election 229,014 to 202,764, marking the first time in sixteen years that the Democrats had gained a majority of the votes cast.

== Later life ==
Belknap continued to be active in business, attending the International Congress of Chambers of Commerce in Liège in 1905. From 1907 to 1909, he was chairman of the Louisville Board of Parks. He was a member of several civic and religious organizations, including the Pendennis Club, the Louisville Country Club, the Salmagundi Club of Louisville, and the Warren Memorial Presbyterian Church of Louisville, where he was a deacon and chairman of the board of trustees. He was president of the Yale Alumni Association in Louisville and director of that city's YMCA.

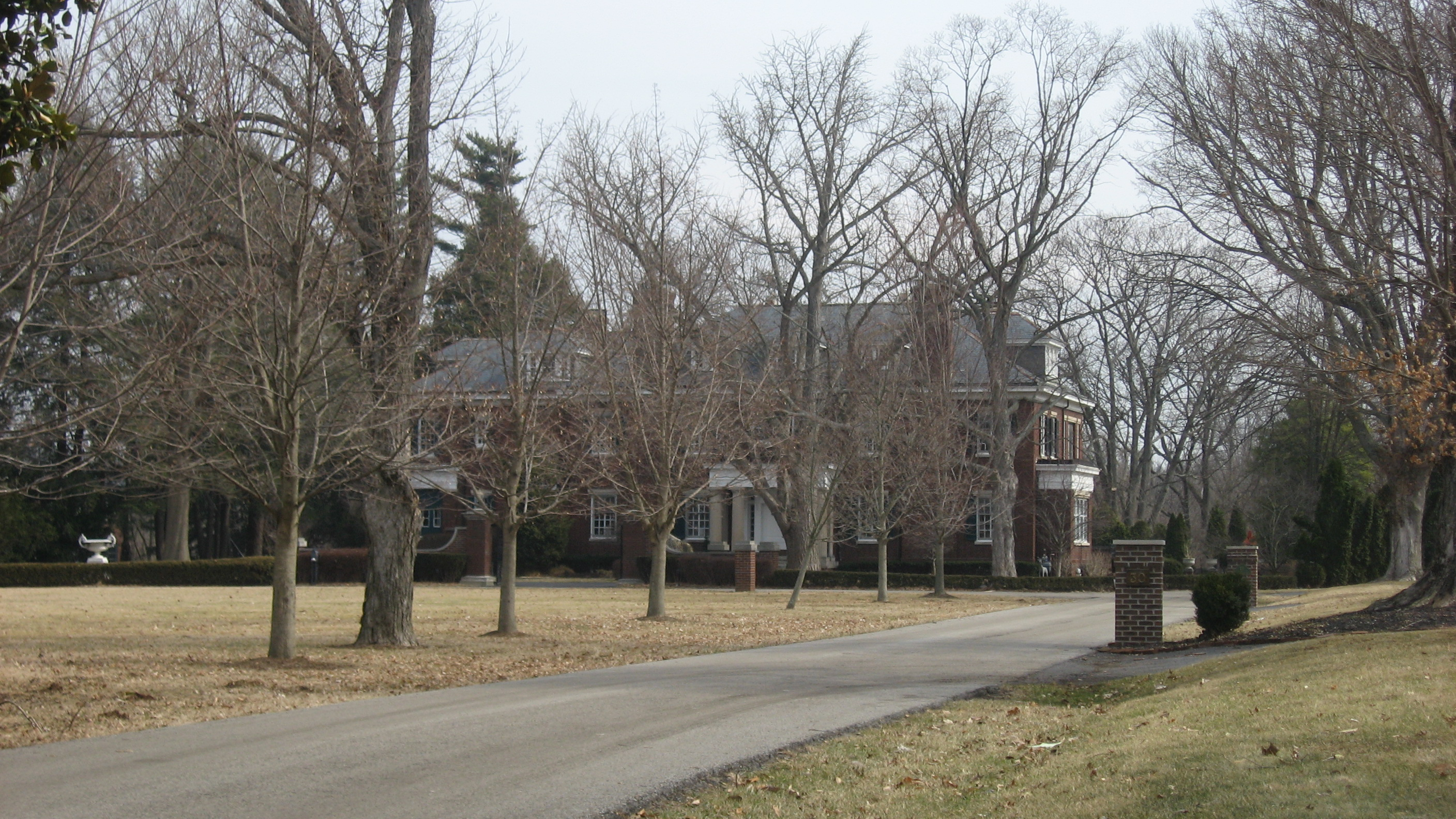
After Belknap's death, the Midlands was built for his widow, Marion, from 1913 to 1914, in Louisville.

Belknap fell ill in late 1907, and his poor health continued into mid-1908. In July 1908, he traveled to Europe in order to improve his health, but after his return in October, his condition worsened again. From January to June 1909, he was bedfast. In early April 1910, he fell into a coma from which he never awakened. He died of pernicious anemia on April 13, 1910, at Lexington, Kentucky and was buried in Cave Hill Cemetery.

Party political offices
Preceded by John W. Yerkes	Republican nominee for Governor of Kentucky; 1903	Succeeded by Augustus E. Willson
