= Belknap Hardware and Manufacturing Company =

Hardware manufacturer and wholesaler

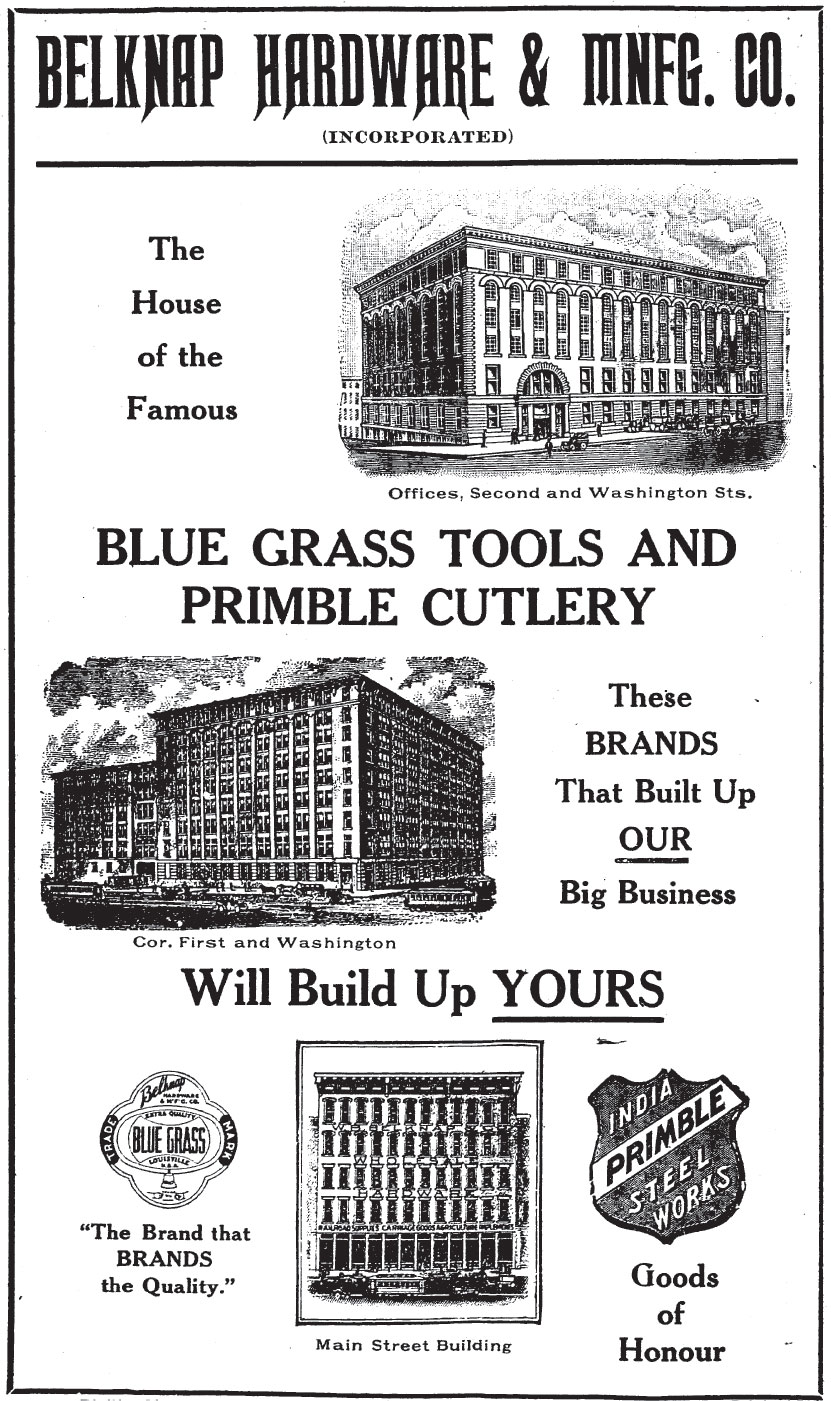
A 1909 ad for the Belknap Hardware and Manufacturing Company

The Belknap Hardware and Manufacturing Company, also known as the Belknap Hardware Company or simply Belknap Hardware, was at one time a leading American manufacturer of hardware goods and a major wholesale competitor of retail sales companies Sears, Roebuck, and Company and Montgomery Ward. Located in Louisville, Kentucky, Belknap excelled both in catalog sales and widespread distribution of its own name-brand manufactured products.

== Origins of the company ==
The company's founder William Burke Belknap the elder (1811–1884) was born in Brimfield, Massachusetts, the son of Morris Burke Belknap the elder (1780–1877) and Phoebe Locke Thompson Belknap (1788–1873) and is not to be confused with William Burke Belknap the younger (1885–1965) or William Burke Belknap Jr. The elder William Burke Belknap started the company on the banks of the Ohio River in 1840. His father Morris Burke Belknap the elder had earlier developed iron foundries and other related businesses in Massachusetts which influenced his son's founding of the Belknap Hardware and Manufacturing Company. Morris Burke Belknap (1856–1910), also known as Morris B. Belknap or Col. Morris Belknap, was a vice president of Belknap Hardware. and was married to Lily Buckner., the daughter of Simon Bolivar Buckner.

Belknap Hardware's fame spread and the company was represented at the 8th Annual Convention of the Panhandle Hardware and Implement Association in Amarillo, Texas. The Belknaps figured prominently in the history of the Pendennis Club of Louisville, the first club house of which, in 1848, was a former Belknap family mansion. After 50 years, Belknap Hardware was acclaimed in the Atlanta Constitution as one of the South's great industries. The company was praised in newspaper advertising by Southern Bell Telephone and Telegraph Company as an exemplary business user of the long distance telephone. By its 100th anniversary in 1940, Belknap Hardware had grown to a landmark complex of 37 buildings, covering 37 acres of floor space under one roof. The building had a network of underground passageways and covered bridges. The warehouse space alone at 129-133 N. Second Street (a building which no longer exists) was eight stories tall.

== The company at height of its long success ==
The company became one of the nation's largest wholesale enterprises with nationally known quality brands, among which Blue Grass was the most readily recognizable. John Primble knives, developed by an employee of the company, became a Belknap brand with its own division, made in Louisville between 1947 and 1985 by the John Primble Belknap Hardware Co. The Crusader manufacturing brand of Belknap included contractors' shovels, hammers, hatchets, axes, drawing knives, carpenters' pincers, planes, screw drivers, hand drills, wrecking bars, bit braces, auger bits, chisels, pliers, wrenches, tin snips, and tin ceilings. Other popular Belknap manufactured products included rifles, guns, padlocks, lawn mowers, and bicycles. Belknap inventory in the vast warehouse spaces grew larger and larger, and the Belknap neon sign could be seen from miles away.

== The company's demise ==
The company was founded by Belknaps and managed predominantly by members of the Belknap family and their chosen successors until its demise in 1986 when, after over 140 years, it faced bankruptcy and was sold. Terrence Gallaher, editor-in-chief of Hardware Age said, "In the late '70's, Belknap's Board of Directors came to include a number of outsiders, men who weren't also company officers . . . . The new board saw an opportunity to appoint someone from outside as president. Up to that time, Belknap promoted top officers from within, and virtually all the men in top management had begun their careers on the road, carrying a catalog."

The closing of Belknap has been called a tragedy of errors. As early as 1909, the hardware company management sued a newspaper which incorrectly announced that Belknap Hardware was bankrupt. The company was also known as W. B. Belknap from 1840 to 1860, W. B. Belknap & Co. from 1860 to 1880, W. B. Belknap and Co. Inc. from 1880 to 1907, and Belknap Hardware & Mfg. Co. from 1907 to 1986.

On July 23, 1968, the Louisville Courier-Journal carried the Associated Press, Dow Jones, and other special dispatches' news that Belknap Hardware and Manufacturing Company was changing its name to simply "Belknap, Inc." The company had not yet gone out of business, but the stockholders the day before approved the change of the name, reasoning that since no abbreviations of firm names were permitted under the new U.S. Fair Packaging and Labeling Act, the full name of the company would be hard to inscribe on small tools. The company's proxy statement explained that Belknap had not "conducted any manufacturing operation for many years," and that it carried much merchandise that was not hardware. Although not a manufacturer at that time, Belknap was still distributing items made for it "by other manufacturers under at least nine Belknap trade names."

In 1923, the Belknap Hardware and Manufacturing Building was built at 101-23 East Main Street in Louisville's General Business District on the site of the second Galt House. It was designed by the architectural firm of Graham, Anderson, Probst, and White of Chicago and at the time it was "the largest single-unit hardware plant in the world. . . .". For a while the building was the location of the Presbyterian denomination's National Headquarters and is now known as the Waterside Building and is occupied by the Humana Corporation.

Photographs of the actual demolition by explosion of a defunct Belknap building were used as promotional preview advertising for the 1993 film, Demolition Man.

The Heyburn Building, on the National Historic Register since 1979, until 1955 was the tallest building in Kentucky. It was completed in 1928 and named for William R. Heyburn, a former president of Belknap Hardware and Manufacturing Company. This skyscraper's height was surpassed as the result of an addition to the top of the now defunct Commonwealth Building, which was imploded in 1994.

A former home of members of the William Richardson Belknap (1849–1914) family, Lincliff, was owned by detective fiction writer Sue Grafton and her husband Stephen F. Humphrey and is on the National Historic Register.
