= William Richardson Belknap =

American businessman

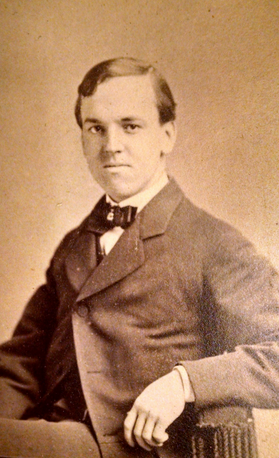
- Born: March 28, 1849; Louisville, Kentucky, U.S.
- Died: June 2, 1914 (aged 65); Jefferson County, Kentucky, U.S.
- Resting place: Cave Hill Cemetery
- Education: Sheffield Scientific School (Yale University)
- Occupation: Businessman
- Known for: President of Belknap Hardware and Manufacturing Company
- Spouses: Alice Trumbull Silliman (m. 1874; died 1890) Juliet Rathbone Davison (m. 1894)
- Children: 5, including William Burke Belknap
- Father: William Burke Belknap

Signature
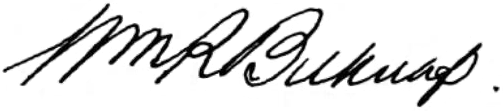

William Richardson Belknap (March 28, 1849 – June 2, 1914), for 28 years was president of the Belknap Hardware and Manufacturing Company based in Louisville, Kentucky, one of the largest hardware American manufacturing companies and wholesale hardware companies of its time. He was the son of the company's founder, William Burke Belknap, and became its president in 1880 following his father's death.

== Early life ==
William Richardson Belknap was born in Louisville on March 28, 1849 to William Burke Belknap and Mary Richardson. His younger brother was Morris B. Belknap. He graduated from Yale's Sheffield Scientific School in 1869, and in 1873 he spent a year traveling in Europe with his younger brother Morris.

== Career ==
In 1880, following the death of his father, founder of the Belknap company, he became its president. After his retirement as president of Belknap Hardware, he became the company's Chairman of the Board.

Belknap was a member of the American Society of Civil Engineers. The William R. Belknap School in the Belknap neighborhood of Louisville was named for him. He was a charter member of the Salmagundi Club and served for three years as its secretary. He was a trustee of Berea College, and the namesake and founder of the William R. Belknap Prizes awarded for excellence in the fields of geology and biology in Yale's Sheffield Scientific School, now awarded annually to Yale College undergraduates.

== Personal life ==
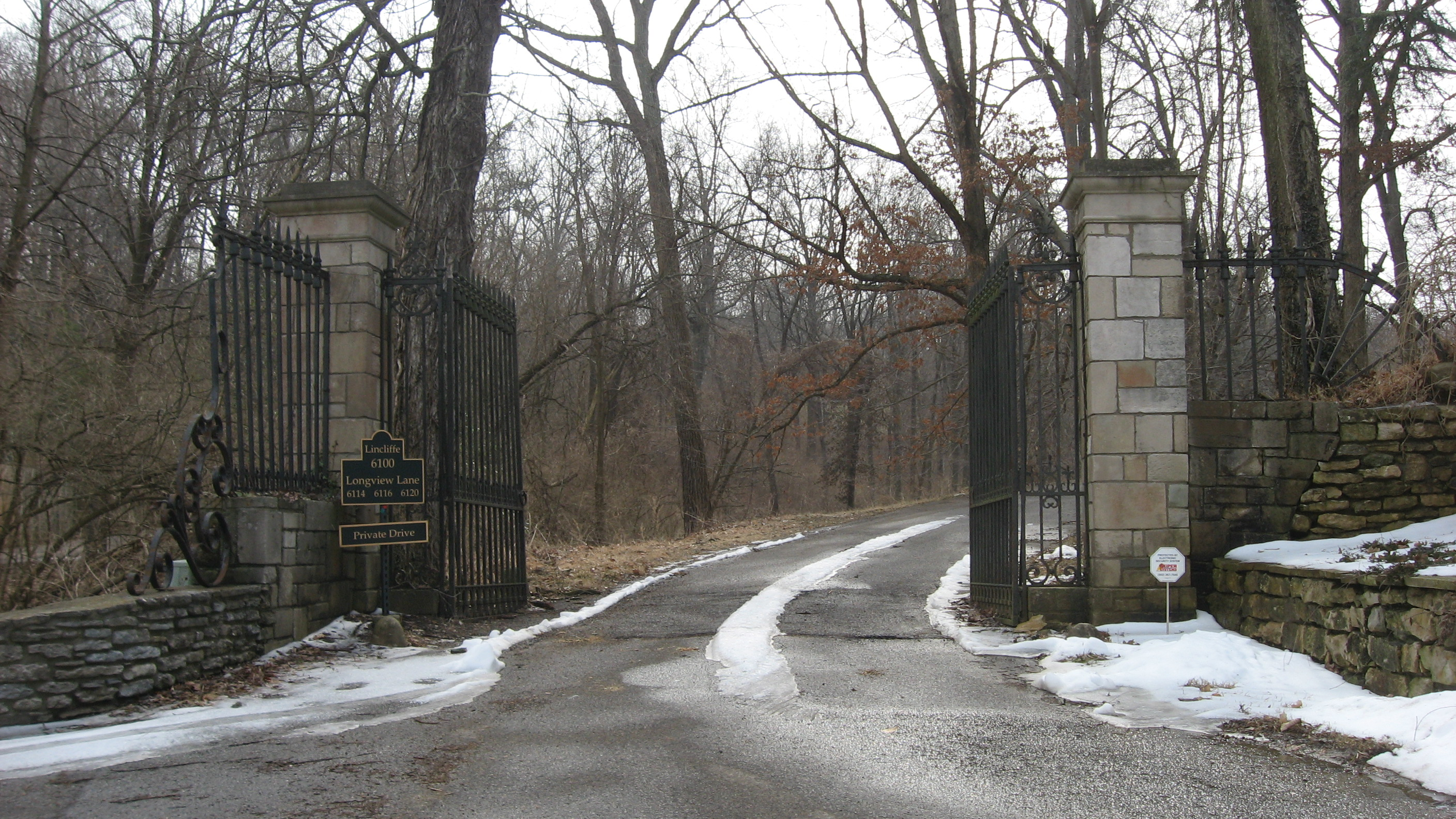
Lincliff gates

In 1874, Belknap married Alice Trumbull Silliman (1846–1890), the daughter of Benjamin Silliman Jr., a professor of chemistry at Yale University who was instrumental in developing the oil industry. They had a son, William Burke Belknap, and four daughters; the eldest, Eleanor, married Kentucky newspaper editor Lewis Craig Humphrey; the second, Alice, married the physician and surgeon Forbes Hawkes.

After his wife's death in 1890, he married Juliet Rathbone Davison (1862–1948) in 1894.

Belknap died on June 2, 1914, in Jefferson County, Kentucky. At his death in 1914, and after building Lincliff in 1911, his estate was estimated at $3,000,000 to $5,000,000. He is buried in the Belknap family plot at Cave Hill Cemetery, Louisville.

=== Residences ===
In 1911, Belknap built his house, Lincliff. The Olmsted Brothers were hired by Belknap to create plans for the estate grounds. Lincliff was added to the National Register of Historic Places in 1983. Lincliff is currently owned by Stephen F. Humphrey, widower of the mystery writer the late Sue Grafton. Together they worked on restoration of the building and grounds.
