= History of Louisville, Kentucky =

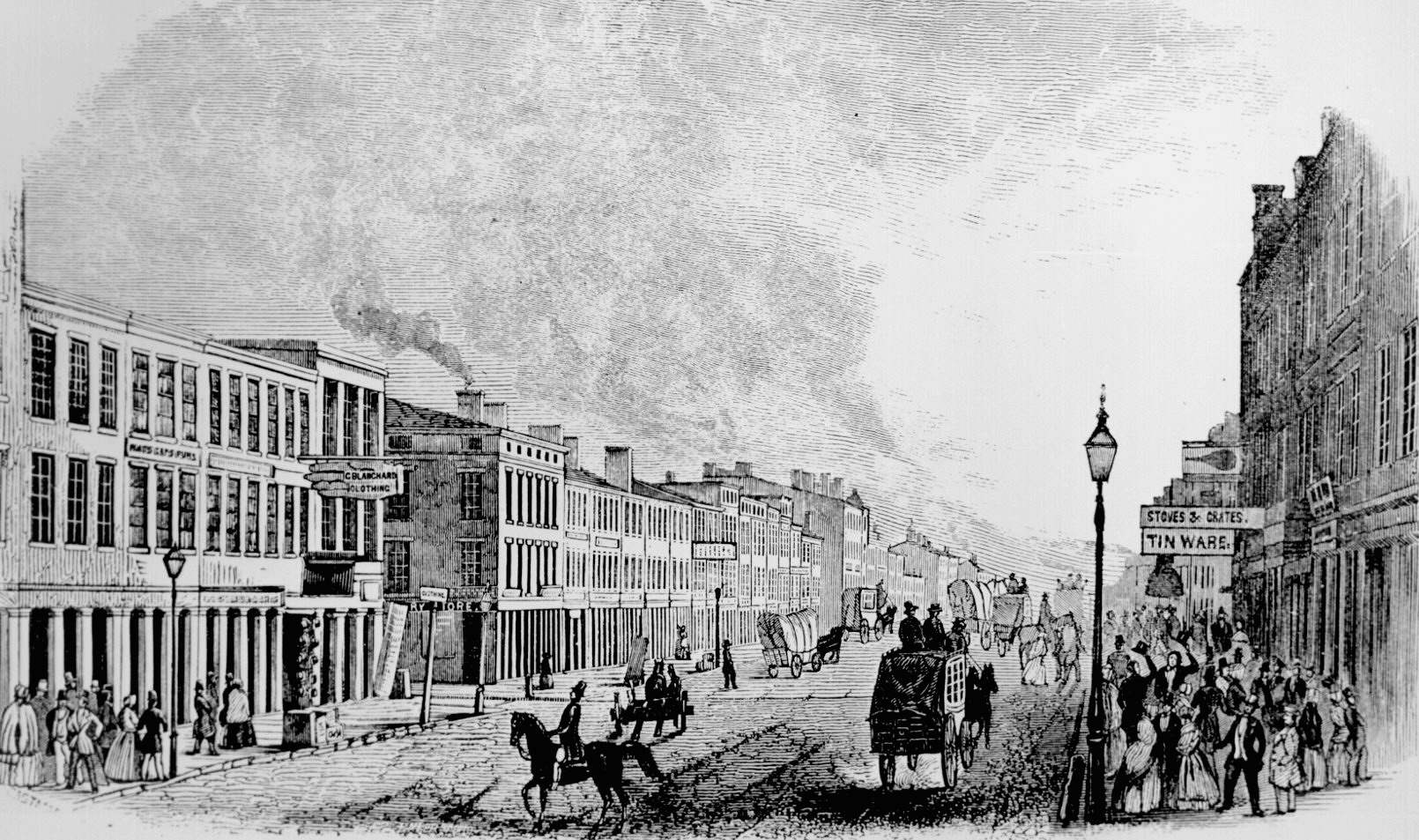
View of Main Street, Louisville, in 1846.

The history of Louisville, Kentucky spans nearly two-and-a-half centuries since its founding in the late 18th century. The geology of the Ohio River, with but a single series of rapids midway in its length from the confluence of the Monongahela and Allegheny rivers to its union with the Mississippi, made it inevitable that a town would grow on the site. The town of Louisville, Kentucky was chartered there in 1780. From its early days on the frontier, it quickly grew to be a major trading and distribution center in the mid-19th century and an important industrial city in the early 20th. The city declined in the mid-20th century, but by the late 20th, it was revitalized as a culturally-focused mid-sized American city.

The area's geography and proximity to the Falls of the Ohio River attracted people from the earliest times. However, prior to arrival of Europeans, the region was depopulated from the Beaver Wars of the 17th century, and no permanent Native American settlements existed in the area. It was used as hunting grounds by southern Shawnee and northern Cherokee. By the late 18th century, as the Falls created a barrier to river travel, settlements by Europeans began to grow at this portage point. The earliest such settlements occurred during the latter stages of the American Revolutionary War by Virginian soldiers under George Rogers Clark, first at Corn Island in 1778, then Fort-on-Shore and Fort Nelson on the mainland. At that time a part of Kentucky County, Virginia, the town was chartered in 1780 and named Louisville in honor of King Louis XVI of France.

In 2003, the city of Louisville merged with Jefferson County to become Louisville-Jefferson Metro. As of the 2010 census, it is the largest city in the state of Kentucky, the largest on the Ohio River, and 28th largest city in the nation.

Important events occurring in the city include the second largest American exhibition to date (1883), which had the largest to-date installation of light bulbs by their recent inventor and then-former resident Thomas Edison, as well as the first free public library in the US to be staffed by and provide services exclusively for African Americans (1905). Medical advances include the 1999 first human hand transplant in the US and the first self-contained artificial heart transplant in 2001.

Other notable residents of the city have included boxing legend Muhammad Ali, U.S. Supreme Court Justice Louis Brandeis, newscaster Diane Sawyer, actors Victor Mature, Ned Beatty and Tom Cruise, actresses Sean Young and Jennifer Lawrence, singers Nicole Scherzinger and Bryson Tiller, rapper Jack Harlow, the Speed family (including U.S. Attorney General James Speed and Abraham Lincoln's close friend Joshua Fry Speed), the Bingham family, industrialist/politician James Guthrie, U.S. Senate Minority Leader Mitch McConnell, and contemporary writers Hunter S. Thompson and Sue Grafton.

== Pre-Anglo-American settlement history (pre-1778) ==
There was a continuous indigenous human occupation of the area that became Louisville from at least 1,000 BCE until roughly 1650 CE, when the Beaver Wars resulted in depopulation of much of the Ohio River region. The Iroquois maintained this area as a hunting ground by conquest.

Archeologists have identified several late and one early Archaic sites in Jefferson County's wetlands. One of the most extensive finds was at McNeeley Lake Cave; many others were found around what is now the Louisville International Airport area. People of the Adena culture and the Hopewell tradition that followed it lived in the area, with hunting villages along Mill Creek and a large village near what became Zorn Avenue, on bluffs overlooking the Ohio River. Archeologists have found 30 Jefferson County sites associated with the Fort Ancient and Mississippian cultures, which were active from 1,000 AD until about 1650. The Louisville area was on the eastern border of the Mississippian culture, which extended through the Mississippi Valley and its tributaries. Regional chiefdoms built dense villages and cities characterized by extensive earthwork mounds arranged around central plazas.

When European explorers and settlers began entering Kentucky in the mid-18th century, there were no permanent Native American settlements in the region. The country was used as hunting grounds by Shawnee from the north and Cherokee from the south.

The account of the first European to visit the area, the French colonizer, René-Robert Cavelier, Sieur de La Salle in 1669, is disputed and not supported by facts. La Salle travelled along the St. Lawrence River to Lake Ontario, then to Lake Erie. The two priests traveling with his party departed the group at that point, and the written documentation of the expedition apparently ceased. Reports of what occurred differ, including abandonment of the journey due to illness, or traveling onward but not to the Ohio River. La Salle did not claim to discover the Ohio River on that voyage nor travel to the falls (of the Ohio). The "discovery" of the Louisville area in 1669 is thus perhaps better assigned to myth or legend. Subsequently, La Salle explored areas of the Mississippi river valley and lower Great Lakes region from the Gulf of Mexico up to modern-day Canada, claiming much of this land for France.

In 1751, the Maryland colonist Christopher Gist explored areas along the Ohio River. Following the defeat of France in the French and Indian War (part of the Seven Years' War in Europe), it ceded control of its territory east of the Mississippi River to Britain.

In 1769, American pioneer Daniel Boone created a trail from North Carolina to Tennessee. He spent the next two years exploring Kentucky. In 1773, Captain Thomas Bullitt led the first exploring party into Jefferson County, surveying land on behalf of Virginians who had been awarded land grants for their service in the French and Indian War. In 1774, James Harrod began constructing Fort Harrod in Kentucky. However, battles with the Native American tribes established in the area forced the American settlers to retreat. They returned the following year, as Boone built the Wilderness Road and established Fort Boonesborough at a site near Boonesborough, Kentucky. The Native Americans allocated a tract of land between the Ohio River and the Cumberland River for the Transylvania Land Company. In 1776, the colony of Virginia declared the Transylvania Land Company illegal and created the county of Kentucky in Virginia from the land involved.

== Founding and early settlement (1778–1803) ==
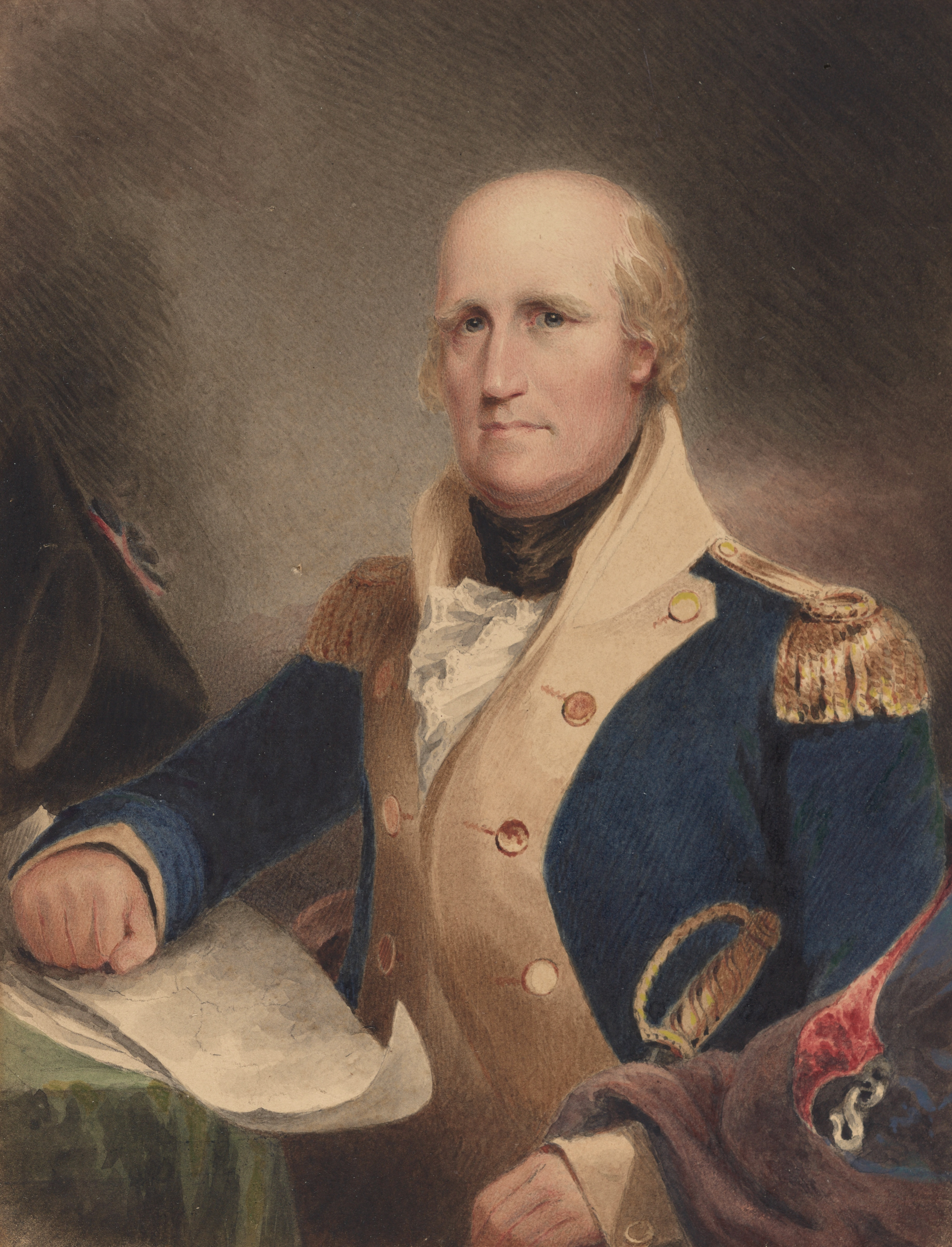
Louisville's founder George Rogers Clark as painted by James Barton Longacre in 1825

Col. George Rogers Clark established the first American settlement in the vicinity of modern-day Louisville in 1778, during the American Revolutionary War. He was conducting his Illinois campaign against the British in areas north of the Ohio River, then called the Illinois Country. Clark organized a group of 150 soldiers, known as the Illinois Regiment, after heavy recruiting in Virginia and Pennsylvania. On May 12, they set out from Redstone, today's Brownsville, Pennsylvania, taking along 80 civilians who hoped to claim fertile farmland and start a new settlement in Kentucky. They arrived at the Falls of the Ohio on May 27. It was a location Clark thought ideal for a communication post. The settlers helped Clark conceal the true reason for his presence in the area.

The regiment helped the civilians establish an initial settlement on what came to be called Corn Island, clearing land, and building cabins and a springhouse. On June 24, Clark took his soldiers and left to begin their military campaign. The first local government was established almost immediately. The first Trustees were selected in April 1779, as part of this transition, with the first board consisting of seven men – William Harrod, Richard Chenoweth, Edward Bulger, James Patton, Henry French, Marsham Brashear, and Simon Moore. In May 1779, at the request of Clark, the settlers crossed the river and established the first permanent settlement on the mainland. By April, they called it "Louisville", in honor of King Louis XVI of France, whose government and soldiers aided colonists in the Revolutionary War. Today, George Rogers Clark is recognized as the European-American founder of Louisville; many landmarks have been named for him.

During its earliest history, the colony of Louisville and the surrounding areas suffered from Indian attacks, as Native Americans tried to push out the encroaching colonists. As the Revolutionary War was still being waged, all early residents lived within forts, as suggested by the earliest government of Kentucky County, Virginia. The initial fort, at the northern tip of today's 12th street, was called Fort-on-Shore. In response to the threat of British attacks, particularly Bird's invasion of Kentucky, a larger fort called Fort Nelson was built north of today's Main Street between Seventh and Eighth streets, covering nearly an acre. The GBP15,000 contract was given to Richard Chenoweth, with construction beginning in late 1780 and completed by March 1781. The fort, thought to be capable of resisting cannon fire, was considered the strongest in the west after Fort Pitt. Due to decreasing need for strong forts after the Revolutionary War, it was in decline by the end of the decade.

In 1780, the Virginia General Assembly and then-Governor Thomas Jefferson approved the town charter of Louisville on May 1. Clark recruited early Kentucky pioneer James John Floyd, who was placed on the town's board of trustees and given the authority to plan and lay out the town. Jefferson County, named after Thomas Jefferson, was formed at this time as one of three original Kentucky counties from the old Kentucky County, Virginia. Louisville was the county seat.

Also, during 1780, three hundred families migrated to the area, the town's first fire department was established, and the first street plan of Louisville was laid out by Willian Pope. Daniel Brodhead opened the first general store here in 1783. He became the first to move out of Louisville's early forts. Jonathan Cessna built the first house in newly platted Louisville. James John Floyd became the first judge in 1783 but was killed later that year. The first courthouse was completed in 1784 as a 16 by 20-foot (6.1 m) log cabin. By this time, Louisville contained 63 clapboard finished houses, 37 partly finished, 22 uncovered houses, and over 100 log cabins. Shippingport, incorporated in 1785, was a vital part of early Louisville, allowing goods to be transported through the Falls of the Ohio. The first church was built in 1790, the first hotel in 1793, and the first post office in 1795. During the 1780s and early 1790s, the town did not grow as rapidly as Lexington in central Kentucky. Factors were the threat of Indian attacks (ended in 1794 by the Battle of Fallen Timbers), a complicated dispute over land ownership between John Campbell and the town's trustees (resolved in 1785), and Spanish policies restricting American trade and travel down the Mississippi to New Orleans. By 1800, the population of Louisville was 359 compared to Lexington's 1,759.

From 1784 through 1792, a series of conventions were held to discuss the separation of Kentucky from Virginia. On June 1, 1792, Kentucky became the fifteenth state in the United States and Isaac Shelby was named the first Governor.

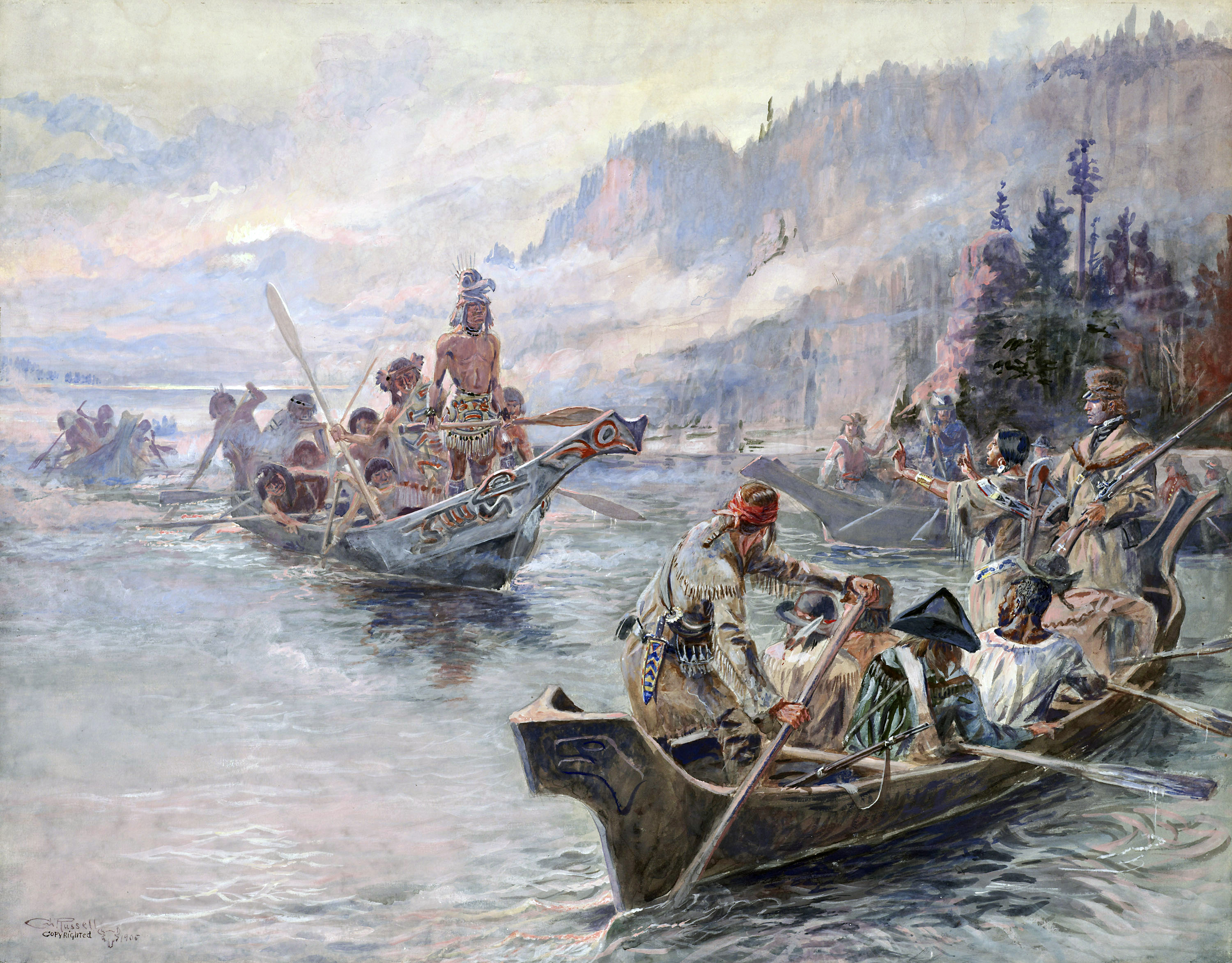
Lewis and Clark on the Lower Columbia by C.M. Russell

In 1803, Meriwether Lewis and William Clark were commissioned by President Thomas Jefferson to make an expedition across North America; they organized it at the Falls of the Ohio and Louisville. The Lewis and Clark Expedition would take the explorers across the western U.S., surveying the Louisiana Purchase, and eventually to the Pacific Ocean.

== City development (1803–1900) ==
=== Antebellum ===
Since settlement, all people and cargo had arrived by flatboats and later keelboats, both of which were non-motorized vessels, meaning that it was prohibitively costly to send goods upstream (towards Pittsburgh and other developed areas). This technical limitation, combined with the Spanish decision in 1784 to close the Mississippi River below Vicksburg, Mississippi to American ships, meant there was very little outside market for goods produced early on in Louisville. This improved somewhat with Pinckney's Treaty, which opened the river and made New Orleans a Free trade zone by 1798.

However, most cargo was still being sent downstream in the early 19th century, averaging 60,000 tons downstream to 6,500 tons upstream. Boats passing through still had to unload all of their cargo before navigating the falls, a boon to local businesses. The frontier days quickly fading, log houses and forts began to disappear, and Louisville saw its first newspaper, the Louisville Gazette in 1807 and its first theatre in 1808, and the first dedicated church building in 1809. All of this reflected the 400% growth in population reported by the 1810 census.

The economics of shipping were about to change, however, with the arrival of steamboats. The first, the New Orleans arrived in 1811, traveling downstream from Pittsburgh. Although it made the trip in record time, most believed its use was limited, as they did not believe a steamboat could make it back upriver against the current. However, in 1815, the Enterprise, captained by Henry Miller Shreve, became the first steamboat to travel from New Orleans to Louisville, showing the commercial potential of the steamboat in making upriver travel and shipping practical.

Industry and manufacturing reached Louisville and surrounding areas, especially Shippingport, at this time. Some steamboats were built in Louisville and many early mills and factories opened. Other towns were developing at the falls: New Albany, Indiana in 1813 and Portland in 1814, each competing with Louisville to become the dominant settlement in the area. Still, Louisville's population grew rapidly, tripling from 1810 to 1820. By 1830, it would surpass Lexington to become the state's largest city, and would eventually annex Portland and Shippingport.

In 1816 the Louisville Library Company, the city's first library, opened its doors with a subscription-based service. Also, in a series of events ranging from 1798 to 1846, the University of Louisville was founded from the Jefferson Seminary, Louisville Medical Institute and Louisville Collegiate Institute.

In response to great demand, the Louisville and Portland Canal was completed in 1830. This allowed boats to circumvent the Falls of the Ohio and travel through from Pittsburgh to New Orleans. In response to several epidemics and the increasing need to treat ill or injured river workers, Louisville Marine Hospital was completed in 1825 on Chestnut Street, an area that is today home to Louisville's Medical Center.

In 1828, the population surpassed 7,000 and Louisville became Kentucky's first city. John Bucklin was elected the first Mayor. The nearby towns of Shippingport and Portland remained independent of Louisville for the time being. City status gave Louisville some judicial authority and the ability to collect more taxes, which allowed for the establishment of the state's first public school in 1829.

In 1831, Catherine Spalding moved from Bardstown to Louisville and established Presentation Academy, a Catholic school for girls. She also established the St. Vincent Orphanage, which was later renamed as St. Joseph Orphanage.

Louisville's famous Galt House hotel—the first of three downtown buildings to have that moniker—was erected in 1834. In 1839, a precursor to the modern Kentucky Derby was held at Old Louisville's Oakland Race Course. Over 10,000 spectators attended the two-horse race, in which Grey Eagle lost to Wagner. This race occurred 36 years before the first Kentucky Derby. It was a popular competition to test the quality of horses. Louisville became a center for sales of horses and other livestock from the Bluegrass Region of central Kentucky, where horse breeding became a major part of the economy and traditions.

The Kentucky School for the Blind was founded in 1839, the third-oldest school for the blind in the country. In 1847, William H. Gibson opened one of the city's first schools for African Americans in the basement of the Methodist church on Fourth and Green Streets.

In 1840 William Burke Belknap the elder (1811–1884) started the Belknap Hardware and Manufacturing Company on the banks of the Ohio River.

In 1848, Zachary Taylor, resident of Jefferson County from childhood through early adulthood and a hero of the Mexican–American War, was elected as the 12th President of the United States. He served only sixteen months in office before dying in 1850 from acute gastroenteritis. He was buried in the east end of Louisville at Zachary Taylor National Cemetery.

Following the 1850 census, Louisville was reported as the nation's tenth largest city, while Kentucky was reported as the eighth most populous state.

The Louisville and Nashville Railroad (L&N) Company was founded in 1850 by James Guthrie, who also was involved in the founding of the University of Louisville. When the railroad was completed in 1859, Louisville's strategic location at the Falls of the Ohio became central to the city's development and importance in the rail and water freight transportation business.

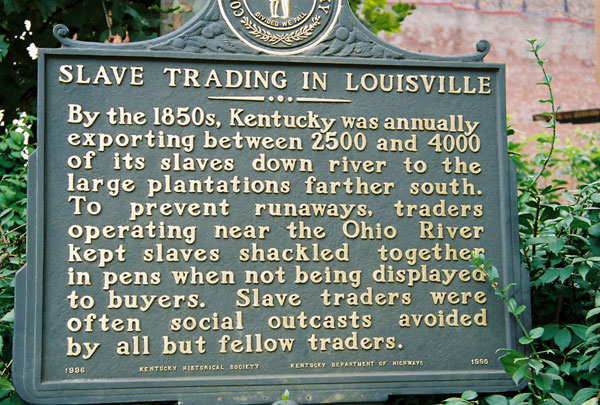
Historical marker from the corner of Second and Main in downtown Louisville describing the slave trade

On August 6, 1855, a day dubbed Bloody Monday, election riots stemming from the bitter rivalry between the Democrats and supporters of the Know-Nothing Party broke out. Know-Nothing mobs rioted in Irish and German parts of the city, destroying property by fires and killing numerous people.

Founded in 1858, the American Printing House for the Blind is the oldest organization of its kind in the United States. Since 1879 it has been the official supplier of educational materials for blind students in the U.S. It is located on Frankfort Avenue in the Clifton neighborhood, adjacent to the campus where the Kentucky School for the Blind moved in 1855.

==== "Sold down the river" ====
Louisville had one of the largest slave trades in the United States before the Civil War, and much of the city's initial growth is attributed to that trade. Shifting agricultural needs produced an excess of slaves in Kentucky, and many were sold from here and other parts of the Upper South to the Deep South. In 1820, the slave population was at its height at nearly 26% of the Kentucky population, but by 1860, that proportion had dropped significantly, even though this percentage still represented over 10,000 people. Through the 1850s, slave traders sold 2500–4000 slaves annually from Kentucky down river.

The expression "sold down the river" originated as a lament of eastern slaves being split apart from their families in sales to Louisville. Slave traders collected slaves there until they had enough to ship in a group via the Ohio and Mississippi rivers down to the slave market in New Orleans. There slaves were sold again to owners of cotton and sugar cane plantations.

Louisville was the turning point for many enslaved blacks. If they could get from there across the Ohio River, called the "River Jordan" by escaping slaves, they had a chance for freedom in Indiana and other northern states. They had to evade capture by bounty-seeking slave catchers, but many were aided by the Underground Railroad to get further north for freedom.

=== Civil War ===
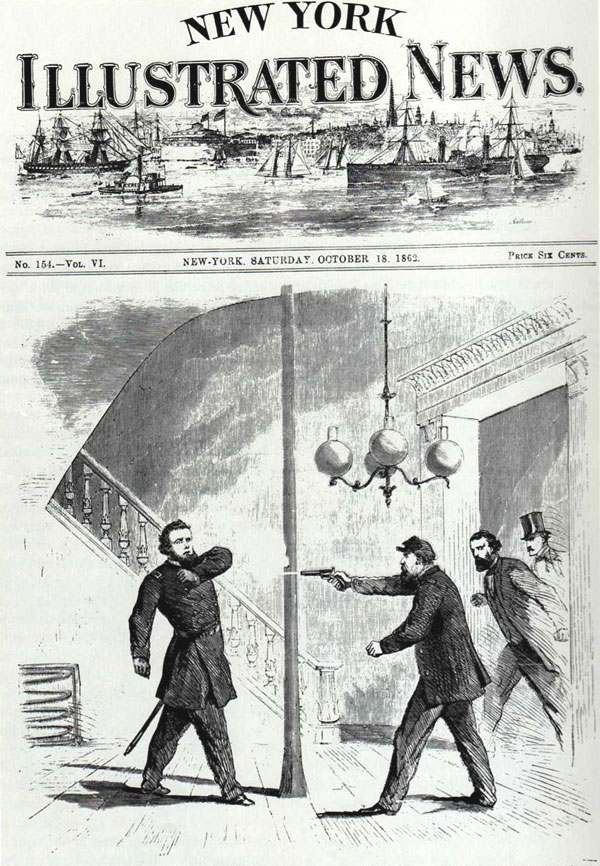
Union Gen. Jefferson C. Davis shoots Union Gen. William "Bull" Nelson on the steps of the Galt House

During the Civil War, Louisville was a major stronghold of Union forces, which kept Kentucky firmly in the Union. It was the center of planning, supplies, recruiting and transportation for numerous campaigns, especially in the Western Theater. While the state of Kentucky officially declared its neutrality early in the war, prominent Louisville attorney James Speed, brother of President Abraham Lincoln's close friend Joshua Fry Speed, strongly advocated keeping the state in the Union. Seeing Louisville's strategic importance in the freight industry, General William Tecumseh Sherman formed an army base in the city in the event that the Confederacy advanced.

In September 1862, Confederate General Braxton Bragg decided to take Louisville, but changed his mind. There was lack of backup from General Edmund Kirby Smith's forces. In addition, the decision to install Confederate Governor Richard Hawes in the alternative government in Frankfort made people think the state might change. In the summer of 1863, Confederate cavalry under John Hunt Morgan invaded Kentucky from Tennessee and briefly threatened Louisville, before swinging around the city into Indiana during Morgan's Raid. In March 1864, Generals Sherman and Ulysses S. Grant met at the Galt House to plan the spring campaign, which included the capture of Atlanta, Georgia. (As of 2014, that this meeting actually occurred has fallen into dispute.)

By the end of the war, Louisville itself had not been attacked once, although it was surrounded by skirmishes and battles, including the Battle of Perryville and the Battle of Corydon. The Unionists—most of whose leaders owned slaves—felt betrayed by the abolitionist position of the Republican Party. After 1865 returning Confederate veterans largely took political control of the city, leading to the saying that it joined the Confederacy after the war was over.

During the postwar years, the Freedmen's Bureau opened a school, led by W. H. Gibson, and a bank in the city to serve the now free and growing African American population. Confederate women organized in associations to ensure the dead were buried in cemeteries, to identify missing men, and to build memorials to the war and their losses. By the 1890s, the memorial movement came under the control of the United Daughters of the Confederacy (UDC) and United Confederate Veterans (UCV), who promoted the "Lost Cause". Making meaning after the war was another way of writing its history. In 1895, in one of their successes, a Confederate monument was erected near the University of Louisville campus.

=== Post-Reconstruction ===
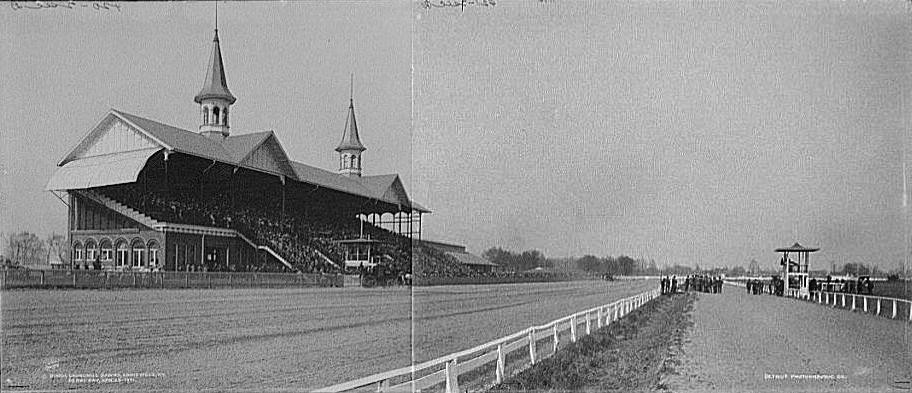
Churchill Downs in 1901

James Callahan and other area businessmen organized the Louisville, Harrods Creek and Westport Railway in 1870 and continued construction through the Long Depression before failing in 1879. Although the LHC&W never reached beyond Harrods Creek, its service was continued by the L&N and contributed to growth in the city's eastern suburbs, particularly after the LRC purchased and electrified the track between Zorn Avenue and Prospect in 1904.

The first Kentucky Derby was held on May 17, 1875, at the Louisville Jockey Club track (later renamed to Churchill Downs). The Derby was originally shepherded by Meriwether Lewis Clark, Jr., the grandson of William Clark of the Lewis and Clark Expedition, and grandnephew of the city's founder George Rogers Clark. Ten thousand spectators were present at the first Derby to watch Aristides win the race.

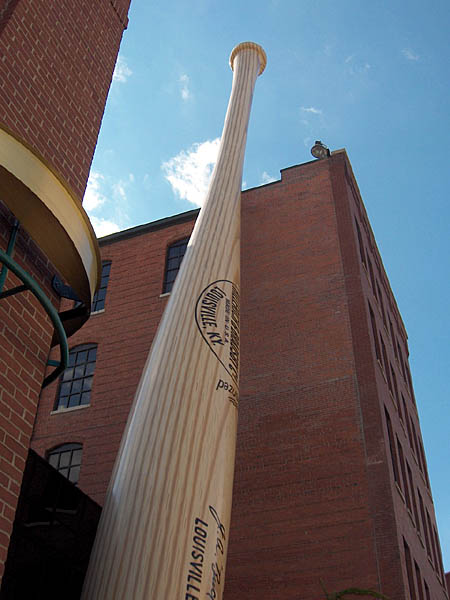
A giant baseball bat adorns the outside of Louisville Slugger Museum in downtown Louisville

On February 2, 1876, professional baseball launched the National League, and the Louisville Grays were a charter member. While the Grays were a relatively short-lived team, playing for only two years, they began a much longer lasting relationship between the city and baseball. In 1883, John "Bud" Hillerich made his first baseball bat from white ash in his father's wood shop. The first bat was produced for Pete "The Gladiator" Browning of the Louisville Eclipse (minor league team). The bats eventually become known by the popular name, Louisville Slugger, and the local company Hillerich & Bradsby rapidly became one of the largest manufacturers of baseball bats and other sporting equipment in the world. Today, Hillerich & Bradsby manufactures over one million wooden bats per year, accounting for about two of three wooden bats sold worldwide.

In 1877 the Southern Baptist Theological Seminary relocated to Louisville from Greenville, South Carolina, where it had been founded in 1859. Its new campus, at Fourth and Broadway downtown, was underwritten by a group of Louisville business leaders, including the Norton family, eager to add the promising graduate-professional school to the city's resources. It grew quickly, attracting students from all parts of the nation, and by the early 20th century it was the second-largest accredited seminary in the United States. It relocated to its present 100-acre (0.40 km^{2}) campus on Lexington Road in 1926.

In February 1882, Oscar Wilde lectured in the city and on that occasion met Emma Speed Keats, the niece of his poetical hero (John Keats), who had settled in the city. She was the daughter of Keats' brother George Keats and she later sent Wilde an autograph manuscript by Keats of his poem 'Sonnet on Blue'.

On August 1, 1883, U.S. President Chester A. Arthur opened the first annual Southern Exposition, a series of World's Fairs that would run for five consecutive years adjacent to Central Park in what is now Old Louisville. Highlighted at the show was the largest to-date installation of incandescent light bulbs, having been recently invented by Thomas Edison, a former resident.

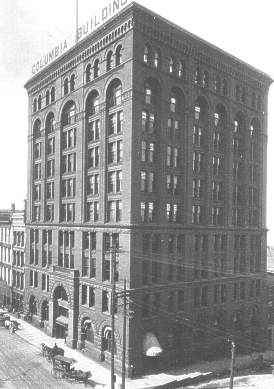
The Columbia Building was the tallest building in Kentucky for a decade

Downtown Louisville began a modernization period in the 1890s, with Louisville's second skyscraper, the Columbia Building, opening on January 1, 1890. The following year, famous landscape architect Frederick Law Olmsted was commissioned to design Louisville's system of parks (most notably, Cherokee, Iroquois and Shawnee Parks) connected by tree-lined parkways. Passenger train service arrived in the city on September 7, 1891, with the completion of the Union Station train hub. The first train arrived at 7:30 am. Louisville's Union Station was then recognized as the largest train station in the South.

Interrupting these developments, on March 27, 1890, a major tornado measuring F4 on the Fujita scale visited Louisville. The "whirling tiger of the air" carved a path from the Parkland neighborhood all the way to Crescent Hill, destroying 766 buildings ($2.5 million worth of property) and killing an estimated 74 to 120 people. At least 55 of those deaths occurred when the Falls City Hall collapsed. This is one of the highest death tolls due to a single building collapse from a tornado in U.S. history.

In 1893, two Louisville sisters, Patty and Mildred J. Hill, both schoolteachers, wrote the song "Good Morning to All" for their kindergarten class. The song did not become popular, and the lyrics were later changed to the more recognizable, "Happy Birthday to You". This is now the most performed song in the English language.

Also in 1893, the Louisville Presbyterian Seminary was founded, building a handsome campus at First and Broadway downtown (now occupied by Jefferson Community College). Eight years later, it absorbed an older Presbyterian seminary in Danville, Kentucky. In 1963 Louisville Seminary relocated to a modern campus on Alta Vista Road near Cherokee Park.

== 20th century and beyond ==
=== Early 20th century ===
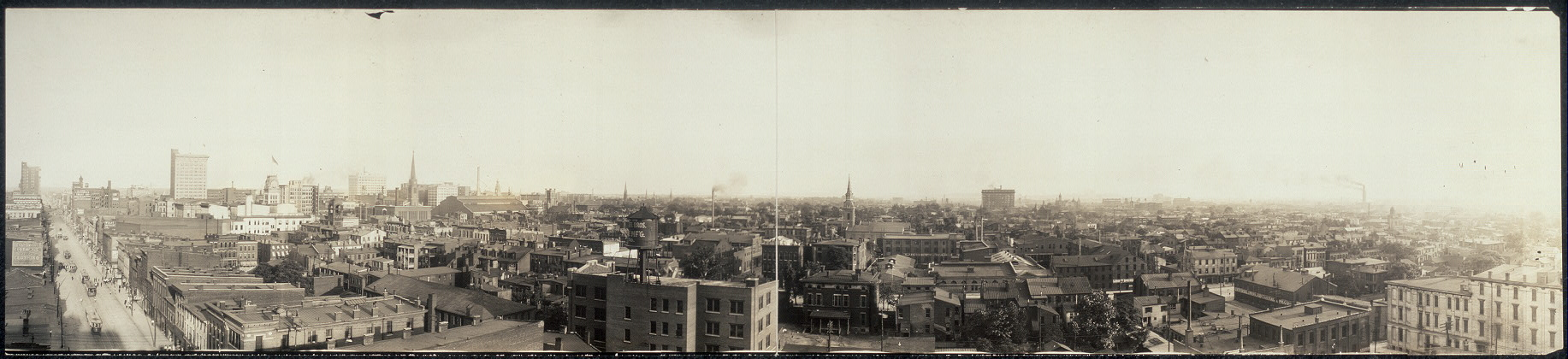
Louisville, Kentucky, c. 1910

Seventy of the Ladies' Memorial Associations, formed between 1865 and 1900, were unified into the Confederated Southern Memorial Association, which was established on May 30, 1900, during the United Confederate Veterans Reunion at Louisville.

In the early 20th century, controversy over political corruption came to a head in the 1905 Mayor election, called the most corrupt in city history. An anti-corruption party unique to Louisville, called themselves the Fusionists, briefly emerged at this time. Democratic boss John Whallen succeeded in getting his candidate, Paul C. Barth, elected, but the results were overturned in 1907. Elections gradually became less corrupt, but political machines would still hold considerable power for decades.

The Waverly Hills Sanatorium was opened in 1910 to house tuberculosis patients. The hospital was closed in 1961. It was later used as a retirement home (1963–1982). It was unused for more than a decade until 1991, when it was reopened for tours.

During World War I, Louisville became home to Camp Taylor. In 1917, the English-bred colt "Omar Khayyam" became the first foreign-bred horse to win the Kentucky Derby. Two years later, in 1919, Sir Barton became the first horse to win the Triple Crown, though the term for the three prime races did not come into use for another 11 years.

In 1920, Louisville's first zoo was founded at Senning's Park (present-day Colonial Gardens), next to Iroquois Park. Barely surviving through the Great Depression, it closed in 1939. Its successor, the current Louisville Zoo, did not open until 1969.

In 1923, the Brown Hotel's chef Fred K. Schmidt introduced the Hot Brown sandwich in the hotel restaurant, consisting of an open-faced "sandwich" of turkey and bacon smothered with cheese and tomato. The Hot Brown became rather popular among locals and visitors alike, and can be ordered by many local restaurants in the area today.

The Belle of Louisville, today recognized as the oldest river steamboat in operation, came to Louisville in 1931. That same year, the Louisville Municipal College for Negroes was established to allow black Louisvillians to attend classes. (The college was dissolved into the University of Louisville with the ending of segregation in 1951.)

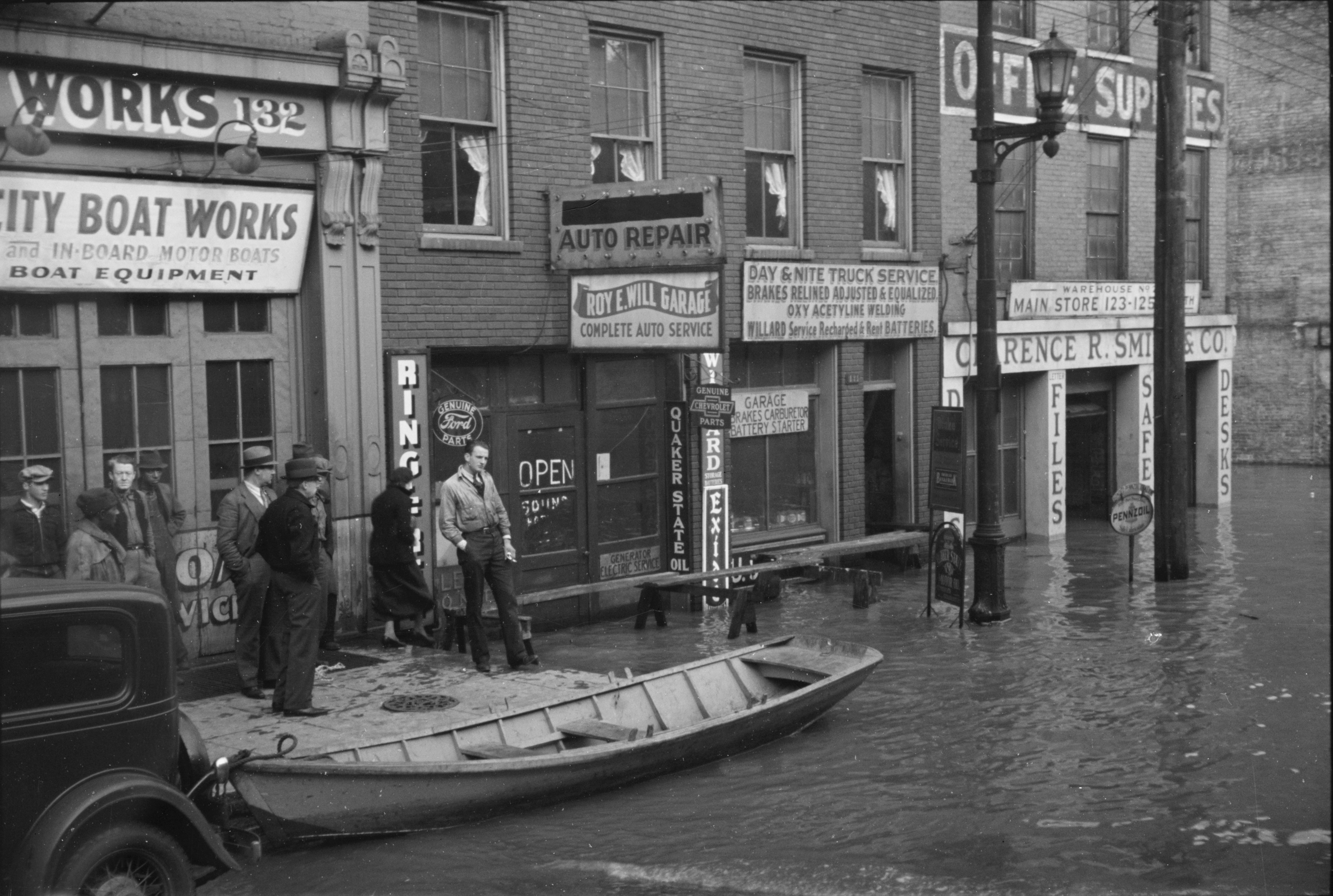
Louisville during the Ohio River flood of 1936; the following year's flood was even worse.

On March 28, 1936, the river reached a level of 60.6 feet, flooding parts of the city. In late January and February 1937, a month of heavy rain throughout the Ohio River Valley prompted what became remembered as the "Great Flood of '37". The flood submerged about 70 percent of the city and forced the evacuation of 175,000 residents. In Louisville, 90 people died. At the crest on January 27, 1937, the waters reached 30 feet (9.1 m) above flood level in Louisville. Photojournalist Margaret Bourke-White documented the flood and its aftermath in a series of famous photos. Later, flood walls were installed to prevent another such disaster.

Standiford Field was built in Louisville by the Army Corps of Engineers in 1941. Bowman Field, a smaller airport, had been previously opened in 1919.

Louisville was a center for factory war production during World War II. In May 1942, the U.S. government assigned the Curtiss-Wright Aircraft Company a war plant located at Louisville's air field for wartime aircraft production. The factory produced the C-46 Commando cargo plane, among other aircraft. In 1946 the factory was sold to International Harvester, which began large-scale production of tractors and agricultural equipment. Otter Creek Park was given to Louisville by the U.S. Government in 1947, in recognition of the city's service during World War II.

Throughout the 20th century, the arts flourished in Louisville. The Speed Art Museum was opened in 1927 and is now the oldest and largest museum of art in Kentucky. The Louisville Orchestra was founded in 1937. In 1949 the Kentucky Shakespeare Festival was begun, and today it is the oldest free and independently-operating Shakespeare festival in the United States. The Kentucky Opera was started in 1952, and the Louisville Ballet was founded that same year, though it only achieved professional status in 1975. In 1956 the Kentucky Derby Festival was started to celebrate the annual Kentucky Derby. The next year, in 1957, the St. James Court Art Show was started. Both these are still popular festivals in the region.

=== Decline in mid-century ===
Eight whiskey distilleries opened on 7th Street Road after the end of prohibition, and Louisville attempted to annex them to increase its tax base. Not wanting to pay city taxes, the whiskey companies persuaded the Kentucky General Assembly to pass the Shively Bill, which made it much more difficult for Louisville to annex additional areas. The distilleries used Kentucky's existing laws (which favored the mostly rural communities in the state) to form a 0.5 square-mile city named Shively in 1938. Shively grew to include residential areas.

In 1946 the General Assembly passed a law allowing the formation of a Metropolitan Sewer District, and Louisville's Board of Aldermen approved its creation a few months later. With the expansion of sewer service outside of traditional city limits and laws hindering Louisville's annexation attempts, areas outside of the city limits that were developed during the building boom after World War II became cities in their own right. This status prevented their annexation by Louisville. As a result, Louisville's population figures leveled off. The incorporation of such several new communities contributed to the defeat of Louisville's attempt to merge with Jefferson County in 1956. Louisville continued fighting to annex land to grow.

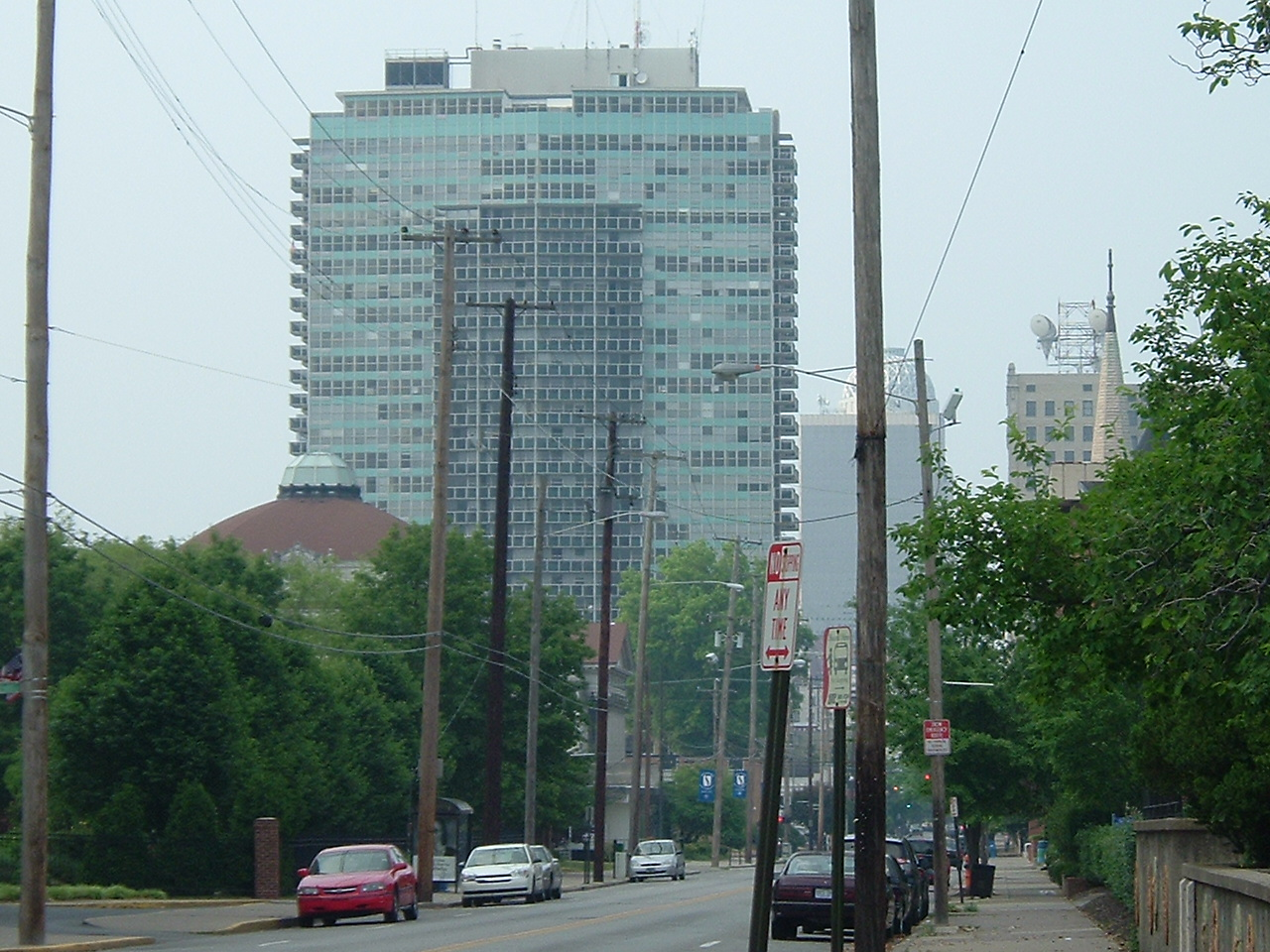
Completed in 1963, the 29 story 800 Apartments was Louisville's first modern high rise.

For a variety of reasons, Louisville began to decline as an important city in the 1960s and 1970s. Highways built in the late 1950s facilitated movement by the expanding middle class to newer housing being developed in the suburbs. With the loss in population, the downtown area began to decline economically. Many formerly popular buildings became vacant. Even the previously strong Brown Hotel closed its doors in 1971 (although it later reopened). Fontaine Ferry Park, Louisville's most popular amusement park during the early 20th century, closed in 1969 as people's tastes for entertainment changed.

The once-strong farmer's market, Haymarket, ceased operations in 1962 after 71 years of operation. The final death-knell for the Haymarket, already in decline due to changing economic trends, was the construction of an Interstate 65 ramp through the main part of the open-air market. Not only did interstates facilitate suburban living, they sliced through older city neighborhoods and often divided them irreversibly.

The Haymarket in Louisville before its closing.

Another major (F4) tornado hit on April 3, 1974, as part of the 1974 Super Outbreak of tornadoes that struck 13 states. It covered 21 miles (34 km) and destroyed several hundred homes in the Louisville area but was only responsible for 2 deaths. It also caused extensive damage in Cherokee Park.

Despite these signs of decline, a number of activities were taking place that presaged the Louisville Renaissance of the 1980s.

Southeast Christian Church, today one of the largest megachurches in the U.S., was founded in 1962 with only 53 members. In 1964, Actors Theatre of Louisville was founded. It was later designated the "State Theater of Kentucky" in 1974. It has created a strong regional theater.

In 1973, the racehorse Secretariat made the fastest time ever run in the Derby (at its present distance) at 1 minute 59 2/5 seconds. Excitement over him raised interest in the Derby.

There were signs of revival in the 1970s. Throughout the decade, new buildings came under construction downtown, and many historic buildings were renovated. Louisville's public transportation, Transit Authority of River City, began operating a bus line in 1974. And in 1981 the Falls of the Ohio was granted status as a Federal conservation area.

On the downside, in the early morning hours of February 13, 1981, sewer explosions ripped through the southern part of Old Louisville and near the University of Louisville. The cause was traced back to chemical releases into the sewer system from a nearby Ralston-Purina soybean processing facility.

Louisville continued to struggle during the 1980s in its attempt to redevelop and expand. It fought with other Jefferson County communities in two more failed attempts to merge with county government in 1982 and 1983. Barry Bingham, Jr. sold the family business Standard Gravure in 1986, which sent the company into a major restructuring in the following years. The Courier-Journal was one of the papers printed by Standard Gravure. On September 14, 1989, Joseph Wesbecker, on medical leave due to mental illness and work-related stress, entered the Courier-Journal building and shot and killed eight employees, injuring another twelve before killing himself.

=== Civil Rights Movement ===
During the Civil Rights Movement in the late 1950s and through the 1960s, Louisville was affected, as it had maintained a segregated society. Civil rights groups undertook a variety of actions to challenge that. In addition, black neighborhoods had declined during the economic downturn of the city. Urban renewal efforts undertaken for ostensible improvements had adversely affected the center of their neighborhood.

After national civil rights legislation had passed in 1964 and 1965, African Americans continued to push for social changes. The National Association for the Advancement of Colored People (NAACP) long maintained an office in the Parkland neighborhood, which had an African-American majority population. In Louisville, as in other cities, there was a political struggle between the NAACP and more militant activists associated with Black Power. The latter's attempt to organize was one of the catalysts for the riot. In addition, feelings were raw because Martin Luther King Jr. had been assassinated less than two months before. On May 27, 1968, a group of 400 mostly African-Americans gathered for a protest in Parkland. They opposed possible reinstatement of a white officer involved in an incident where physical conflict had occurred in the arrest of two African-American men. The group was organized by the Black Unity League of Kentucky, known as BULK. BULK had announced that activist Stokely Carmichael was to come to Louisville to speak, but he had no such plans. When the crowd gathered, speakers spread rumors that Carmichael's plane had been purposely delayed; protesters got angry, and a disturbance began.

The crowd's tossing bottles and looting forced police to retreat. By midnight, rioters had looted several stores in Downtown Louisville. Cars were overturned and some burned. Mayor Kenneth A. Schmied ordered the 2,178 Kentucky National Guardsmen to help disperse the crowd. The mayor also issued a citywide curfew. 472 arrests were made during the riots, two African-American teenage boys were killed, and over $200,000 in property damage was done. The National Guard remained in place until June 4, 1968. Following these events, the city's demographics changed dramatically; the city became more racially segregated by neighborhoods, and more middle-class people, of both races, moved to newer housing in the suburbs.

Despite the Supreme Court's ruling in Brown v. Board of Education in 1954, Louisville's public schools were still essentially segregated, especially as regional residential segregation had become more pronounced due to other economic changes. In 1971 and 1972 the Kentucky Civil Liberties Union, Legal Aid Society, and NAACP filed suit in federal court to desegregate the Louisville and Jefferson County school systems. The Kentucky Commission on Human Rights also filed suit asking that desegregation be achieved through merger of the Louisville, Jefferson County and Anchorage school systems, to overcome residential segregation and the inability of the city to expand by annexation and take in a more diverse area. By February 28, 1975, the state Board of Education ordered the merger of the Louisville and Jefferson County schools systems effective April 1, 1975.

On July 17, 1975, Judge James F. Gordon stipulated that a desegregation plan would be implemented at the beginning of the 1975–76 school year, to begin September 4, 1975. The school system used mandatory busing to distribute students to integrate the newly merged school systems. The students were bused according to the first initial of their last name and their grade level. The busing was to achieve certain percentages of racial diversity in schools regardless of where the students lived. In practical effects, the plan required black students to be bused up to 10 of their 12 years in school, and white students 2 of their 12 years. In 1978 the judge ended his supervision of the project, but the decree remained in effect in some places. The school system continued the busing system. In the mid-1980s, the school system restructured the plan to try to provide for more local schooling for students. Guidelines remained in effect for percentages of the student population based on ethnicity.

=== Revitalization efforts ===
Since the 1980s, Louisville has had a revival in popularity and prosperity. This can be seen in the many changes in this period, including a great deal of downtown infrastructure.

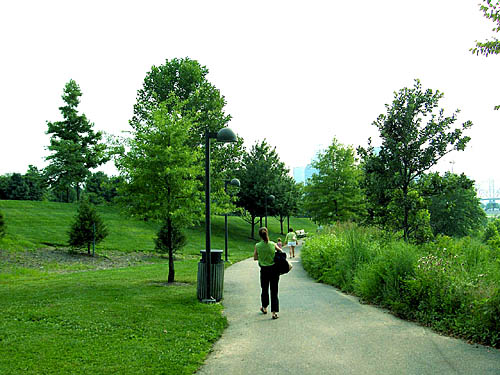
The Louisville Waterfront Park features gentle hills, spacious lawns, and walking paths along Louisville's waterfront in the downtown area

The retail environment changed here and across the country. Woolworth went out of business in 1990. The building in Louisville, designed by architect Frederick W. Garber and completed in 1946, was demolished in 2004. The site was not redeveloped at the time, but paved for a parking lot.

Many cultural showcases were founded or expanded in this period. The Kentucky Center for the Arts was officially dedicated in 1983. In 1984 the center hosted one of the U.S. presidential election debates between candidates Ronald Reagan and Walter Mondale. Today the center hosts many touring plays and performances by the Kentucky Opera and the Louisville Ballet. An IMAX theater was added to the Kentucky Science Center in 1988. Phase I of the Louisville Waterfront Park was completed in 1999, and Phase II was completed in 2004. Though originally built as a standard movie theater in 1921, the Kentucky Theater was reopened in 2000 as a performing arts venue.

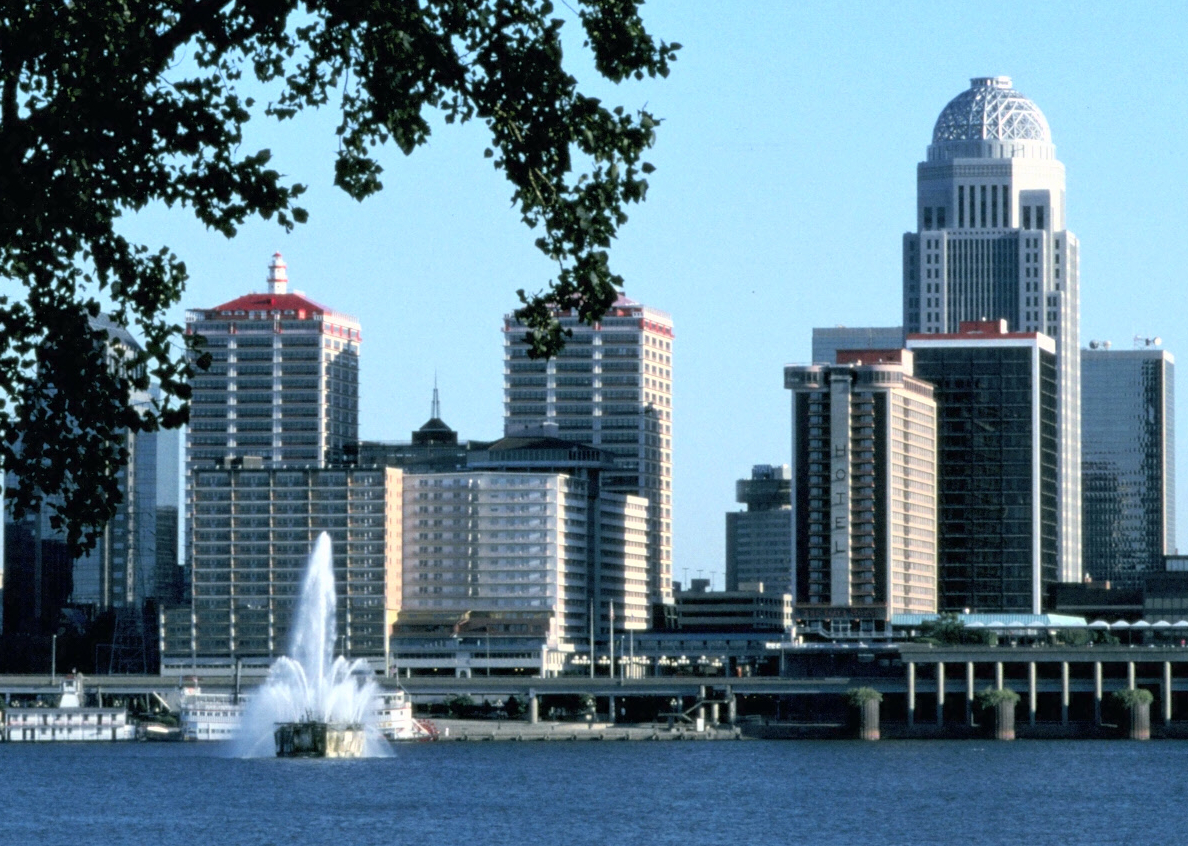
Louisville Falls Fountain, here viewed from Southern Indiana in 1993, operated from 1988 to 1998.

In 1988, the Louisville Falls Fountain, the tallest computerized fountain in the world, began operation on the Ohio River at Louisville. Its 420-foot (130 m) high spray (later reduced to 375 feet (114 m) due to energy costs) and fleur-de-lis patterns graced Louisville's waterfront until the fountain was shut down in 1998.

The headquarters of the Presbyterian Church (U.S.A.), the largest Presbyterian denomination and a pillar of the religious "main line," moved to Louisville in 1988. The move was the result of a concerted campaign, led by Louisville Presbyterian Theological Seminary president John Mulder, Louisville mayor Jerry Abramson, and with a gift of waterfront buildings from Humana founder David Jones.

In communications, The Courier-Journal, Louisville's primary local newspaper, was purchased in 1987 by media giant Gannett. The Louisville Eccentric Observer (LEO), a popular alternative newspaper, was founded in 1990. Velocity was later released by the Courier-Journal to compete with the LEO in 2003.

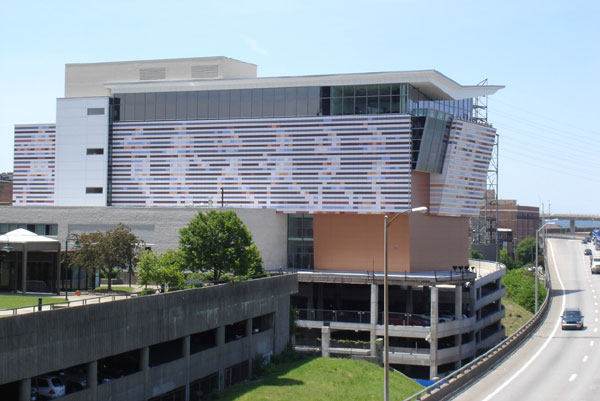
The Muhammad Ali Center, alongside Interstate 64 on Louisville's riverfront

In 2003, the city of Louisville and Jefferson County merged into a single government named Louisville-Jefferson County Metro Government. This merger made Louisville the 16th or 27th most populous city in the U.S., depending on how the population is calculated. The change enabled consolidation of some services and activities to provide better government for the region.

New changes and growth continued in the city. The entertainment and retail district called Fourth Street Live! was opened in 2004, and the Muhammad Ali Center was opened in 2005. Between the 1990 census and 2000 census, Louisville's metro area population outgrew that of Lexington by 149,415, and Cincinnati's by 23,278.

== Preservation and presentation of Louisville history ==
Since 1884, The Filson Historical Society (originally named the Filson Club), with its extensive collections, has led the way in preserving Louisville's history, and publishes articles in its quaristorical collections.

As of 2016, Louisville did not have a museum dedicated to the city's history. Various museums and historic homes present exhibits that interpret this history. These include the Filson, Portland Museum, Historic Locust Grove, Falls of the Ohio State Park interpretive center (Clarksville, Indiana), Howard Steamboat Museum (Jeffersonville, Indiana), Carnegie Center for Art & History (New Albany, Indiana), and the Thomas D. Clark Center for Kentucky History (Frankfort).

In 2004 The Frazier History Museum, previously known as the Frazier Historical Arms Museum and the Frazier International History Museum opened a history museum located on Museum Row in the West Main District of downtown Louisville, Kentucky.

== See also ==
- History of Germans in Louisville
- History of the Irish in Louisville
- Timeline of Louisville, Kentucky
- List of mayors of Louisville, Kentucky
- History of Jefferson County, Kentucky
- History of Kentucky
- List of historic properties in Louisville (attractions)
- National Register of Historic Places listings in Jefferson County, Kentucky
