= Louisville, Harrods Creek and Westport =

The Louisville, Harrods Creek and Westport (LCH&W) may refer to either of:

- the Louisville, Harrods Creek and Westport Railway (1870–1879)
- the Louisville, Harrods Creek and Westport Railroad (1879–1935)

Both were named for the communities of Louisville and Harrods Creek in Jefferson and Westport in Oldham County. Neither ever reached beyond Harrods Creek.
