= Louisville, Harrods Creek and Westport Railroad =

The Louisville, Harrods Creek and Westport Railroad was a 19th-century railway company in the U.S. state of Kentucky. It was formed from the failed Louisville, Harrods Creek and Westport Railway in 1879, gave up its predecessor's hope of reaching Westport or beyond, and simply continued service along the existing 3 ft (914 mm) narrow gauge railway line between Fulton Street and Harrods Creek until the company's 1881 purchase by the Louisville and Nashville Railroad.

The L&N continued the LHC&W's separate existence, but converted it to 4 ft 8 1/2 in (1,435 mm) standard gauge. Under the L&N, it offered passenger service on four daily round trips and principally serviced commuters living along River Road (the old Louisville–Westport Turnpike). At night, the line was employed for freight service by a lime kiln, bourbon distillery, two quarries, and nearby farms.

In 1904, the L&N sold the 8 miles (13 km) between Zorn Avenue and Prospect to the Louisville Railway Company, which electrified the rail and ran hourly commuter shuttles.

All service on both stretches were abandoned during the Great Depression in 1935. The LHC&W's rights-of-way continued to be employed by the L&N for freight service, however, and presently make up part of the class-I CSX Transportation system.

== See also ==
- List of Kentucky railroads
- Louisville, Harrods Creek and Westport Railway
