= Louisville and Interurban Railroad =

Overview
- Locale: Louisville, Kentucky
- Dates of operation: 1904–1935

Technical
- Track gauge: 5 ft (1,524 mm)

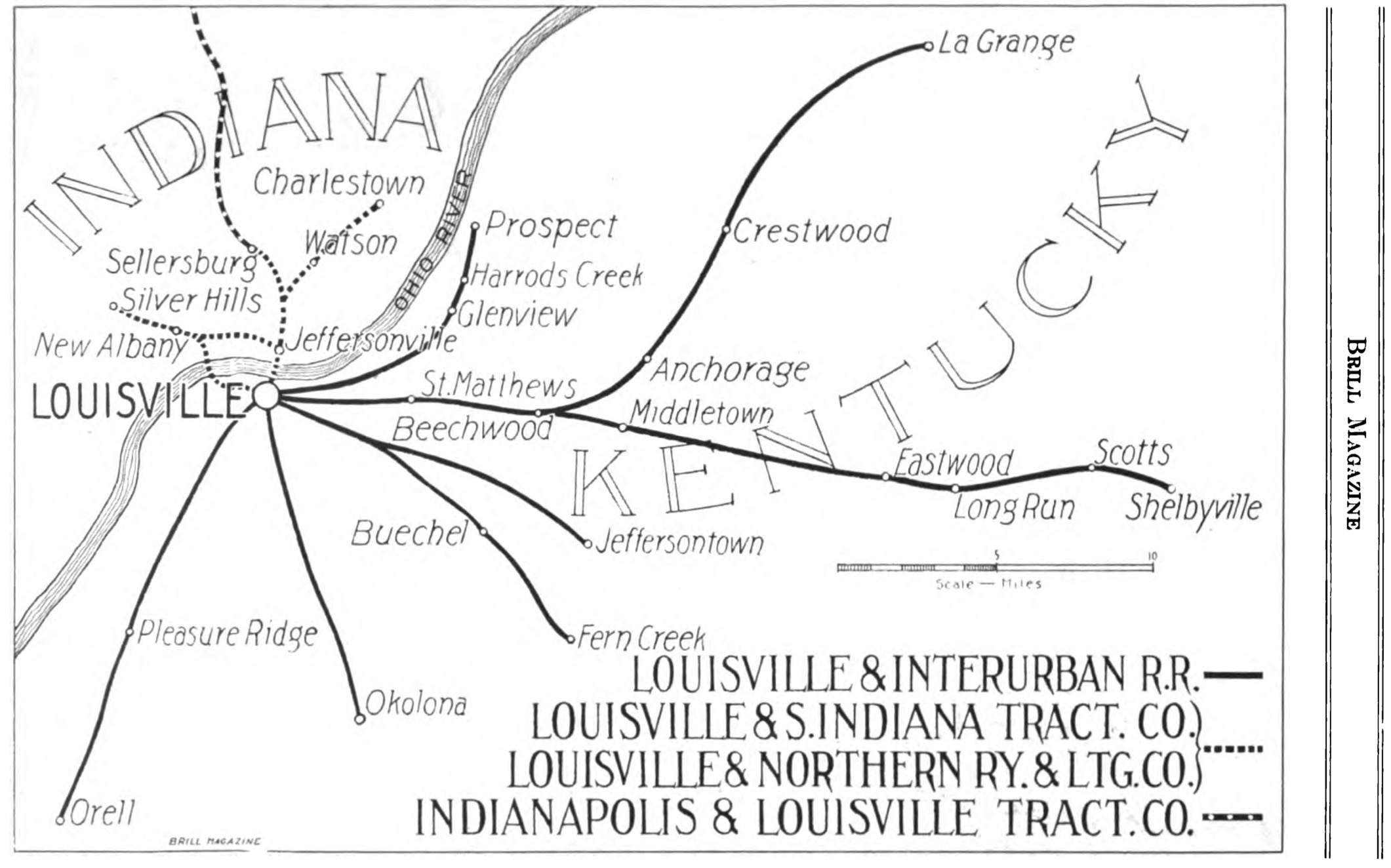
Map of interurban railways emanating from Louisville in 1916 with Louisville and Interurban lines drawn in solid lines, published in Brill Magazine

The Louisville and Interurban Railroad (L&I) was an interurban company that operated lines in and around Louisville, Kentucky during the first half of the 20th century. The L&I was owned by the Louisville Traction Company, which also operated local streetcar service through Louisville Railway Company.

Interurban operations began in 1904 with two lines to Jeffersontown and Prospect. Subsequent routes were built to Okolona in 1905, Orell in 1907, and Fern Creek in 1908. In 1911, L&I acquired the Louisville & Eastern Railroad, which consisted of lines from Louisville to Shelbyville and La Grange. Operations were separated into seven divisions, corresponding to the terminals of the routes. Outside of Louisville, cars operated in private rights of way, which allowed for high speeds and reliable schedules. Between 1931 and 1935, all routes were abandoned.

== Rolling stock ==
The rolling stock initially consisted of 21 St. Louis Car Company units. By 1916, the company's passenger fleet featured 42 motor cars and seven passenger trailers.

== See also ==
- Transportation in Louisville, Kentucky
