= History of the Irish in Louisville =

The history of the Irish in Louisville, Kentucky, United States, dates to the founding of the city. There were two major waves of Irish influence on Louisville - the Scots-Irish in the late 18th century, and those who escaped from the Great Famine of the 1840s.

== 18th century ==
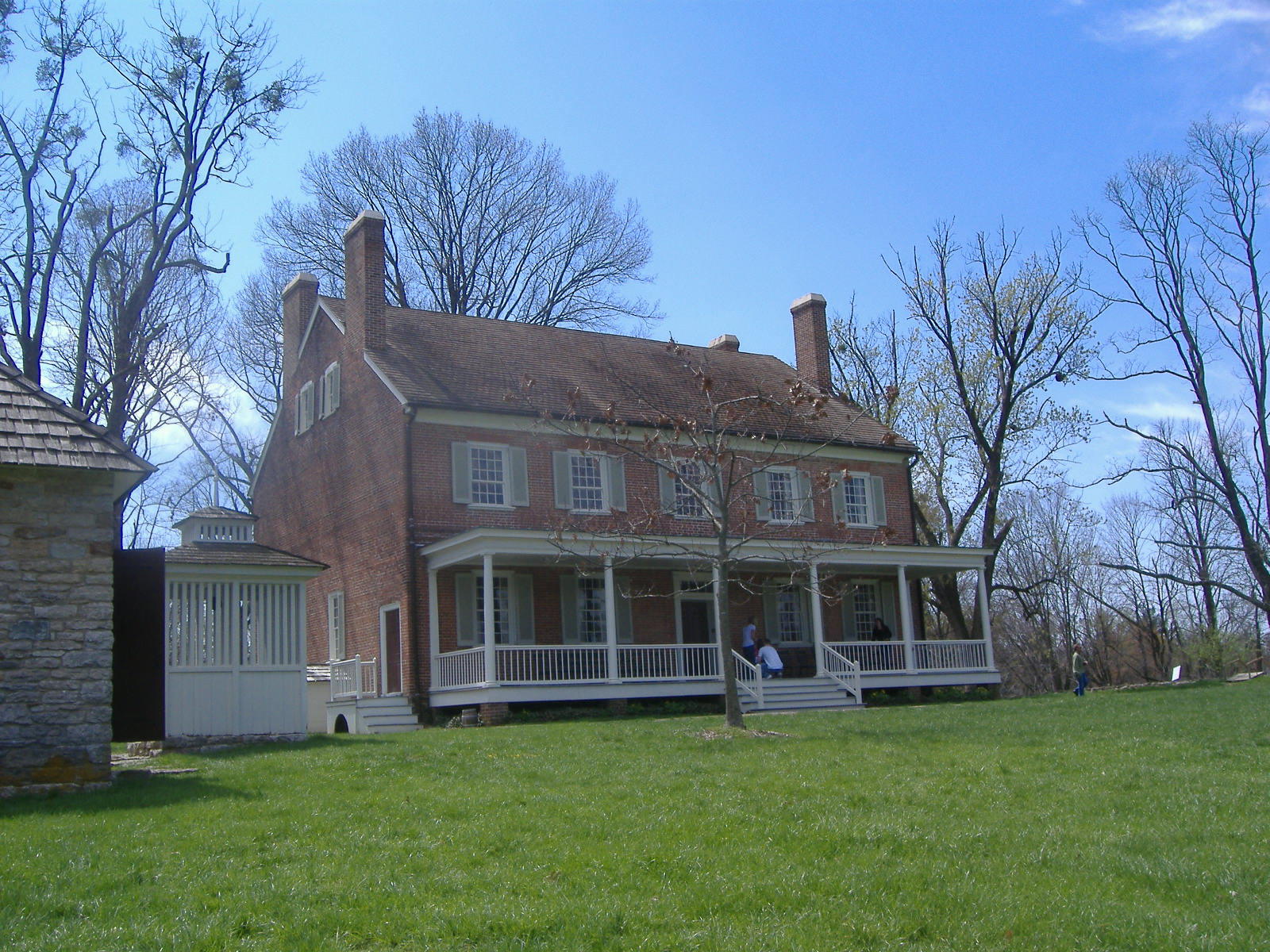
Locust Grove

Louisville was born from the original settlement by George Rogers Clark of Corn Island. Among the first settlers were the Irish families of Coomes, Doherty, McManis and Hart. The original surveys of the land that became Louisville were made by the Irishmen John Campbell and John Connolly. William Croghan, who was the brother-in-law of Clark, had a tremendous influence, best represented by Historic Locust Grove, which was built by Croghan and is now a National Historic Landmark. A stockade on the outer reaches of Louisville was built by Irishman James Sullivan in 1780.

== 19th century ==
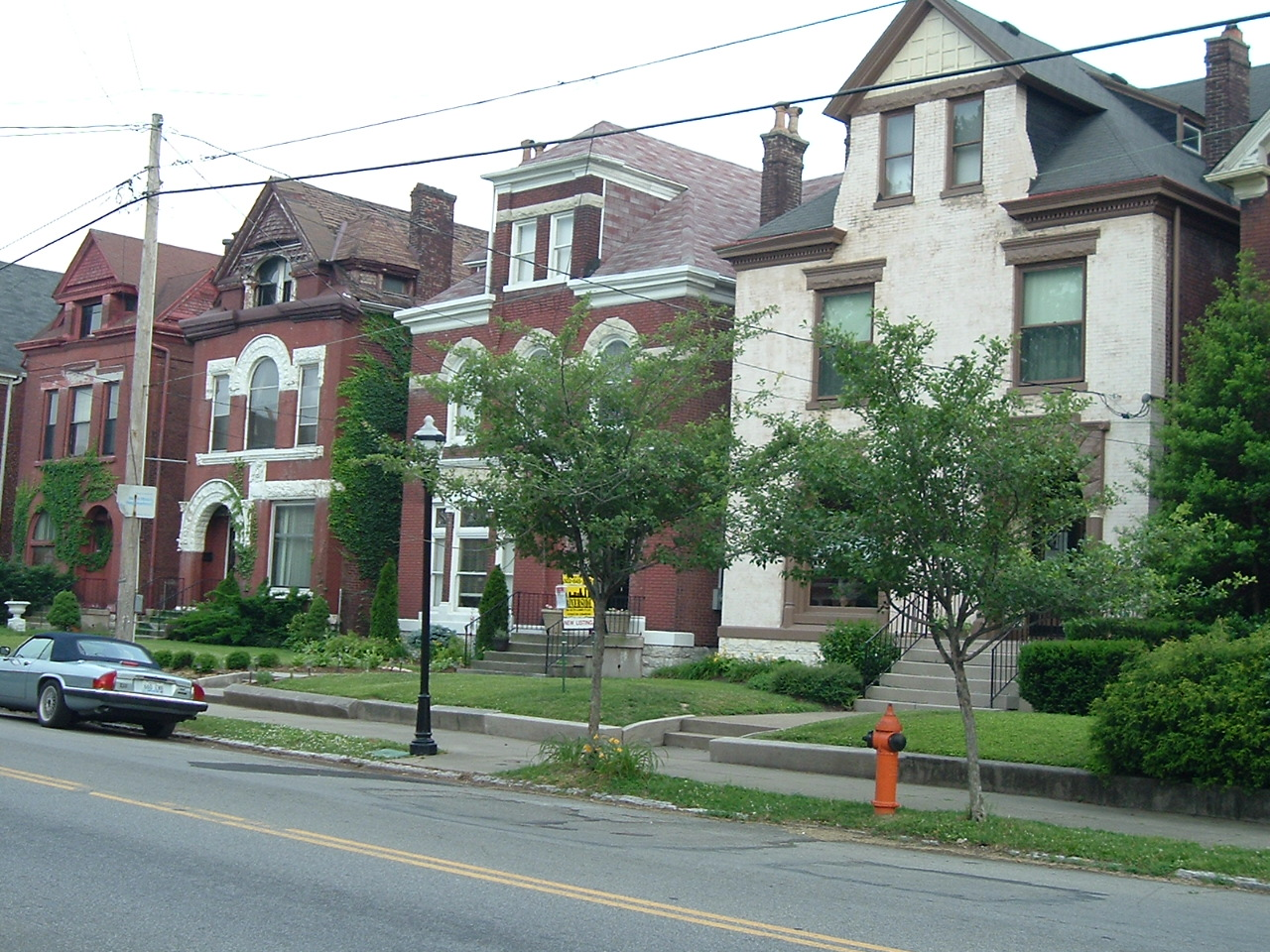
Detached villas built by "lace curtain" Irish in the 1890s in the Limerick district

In 1805, several Irish natives were living on Fifth Street by the Ohio River, but due to exogamous marriages and removals to new residences this was the last concentration of the Scots-Irish/Ulster Scots in Louisville. Irish from beyond the borders of Ulster did not arrive in Louisville until after the War of 1812.

The new wave of Irish began in 1812 when James Anderson migrated to Louisville. He started a successful wholesale dry goods store and also directed the Louisville branch of the Bank of the United States and joined the Louisville Commons Council. By 1825, many new Irish had come to Louisville, starting jobs such as candlemaking, groceries and boardinghouses.

With all the Irish coming to Louisville, many of the jobs that would normally be served by chattel slaves were instead being performed by the Irish, causing a major decrease in the number of slaves in Louisville before 1860. However, the influx of Irish brought with it different tensions, as it increased the number of Catholics in the city. This culminated in the Bloody Monday riots in 1855.

By the late 1860s, Irish residents of Portland moved to the Limerick district of Louisville, in order to be closer to their jobs with the Louisville & Nashville Railroad. It became the predominant Irish neighborhood in Louisville until 1905.

== 20th century ==
The Kentucky Irish American was a newspaper printed for the Irish in Louisville. Founded in 1896 in Limerick, it existed until 1968. However, Limerick as an Irish stronghold ended after the Louisville and Nashville Railroad in 1902 chose to move its shop to Louisville's Highland Park district, causing most of its Irish workforce to move with it. By 1920, Limerick had lost its Irish character; the last St. Patrick's Day Parade in Limerick was in 1918. Louisville did not see another until the 1970s.

The Irish decline continued for decades. The Ancient Order of Hibernians once had seven chapters in Louisville, but the last one folded in 1944. The 1960s saw a renewed interest in Irish culture in Louisville, and the Hibernians returned to Louisville in 1966; the National Convention met in Louisville in 1994 at the Galt House. Other groups interested in Irish culture formed. Mayor Harvey Sloane brought back the Saint Patrick's Day parades during his administration. Outside of Chicago, no city has had more Irish music bands than Louisville.

== 21st century ==
As of the early 21st century, Louisville had several businesses with Irish connections. These include an "Irish Pub District", centered around Baxter Avenue, which includes Dublin's Cellar, Flanagan's Ale House, Molly Malone's, O'Shea's, The Irish Rover, and The Celtic Center.

On April 14, 2008, Louisville became a twin city with Bushmills in Northern Ireland. Bushmills residents had voted to decide whether to twin with Louisville, Boston, Massachusetts, or Portland, Maine.

On July 17, 2013, a Gaelic games club was formed and was named the Louisville Gaelic Athletic Club.

== See also ==
- History of Louisville, Kentucky
- History of the Germans in Louisville
