= History of Germans in Louisville =

The history of Germans in Louisville began in 1817. In that year, a man named August David Ehrich, a master shoe maker born in Königsberg, arrived in Louisville. Ehrich was the first native-born German in Louisville, but as early as 1787, Pennsylvania Dutch (Deutsch) settlers arrived in Jefferson County from Pennsylvania. While they maintained German customs from their ancestors who came to Pennsylvania several generations before, they were not native Germans. The Blankenbaker, Bruner, and Funk families came to the Louisville region following the American Revolutionary War, and in 1797 they founded the town Brunerstown, which would later become Jeffersontown, Kentucky. Further early immigration of Germans took place as they slowly followed the Ohio River after arriving in the United States at New Orleans, and settled in the various river towns, which included not only Louisville, but Cincinnati, Ohio, and St. Louis, Missouri, as well.

== 19th century ==
By the 1850s 35% of Louisville's population would be German, totaling 18,000. Many of this number included a few Swiss and Austrians for whom German was their native language, and would often live amongst the Germans. This large population would introduce to Louisville two different concepts: bilingual education, and kindergartens. By 1854, Louisville public schools taught German. By 1900, 48,000 Louisvillians were at least half-German

The Germans would found many of the city's churches. The first was St. Paul's German Evangelical Church in 1836. Others included St. Peter's German Evangelical Church and St. John's Evangelical Church. Even the first synagogue was created by Germans, as Jewish immigrants from Germany created Temple Adath Israel in 1838. In total, thirteen churches in Louisville specifically catered to Germans.

Germans would also be instrumental in food. Butchertown got its name for the various meat-packing companies operated there by Germans, with some in Germantown as well. The most prominent of these meat-packers would be Henry Fischer's, whose Fischer Packing Company still exists today as a popular local brand of meat. Throughout the city there were bakeries and confectioners of German heritage. The German-speaking Swiss ran the nearby dairy operations.

It was not entirely peaceful for the Germans in Louisville, particularly politically. The "Forty-Eighters", who had come to the United States due to the Revolution of 1848, and these immigrants were big believers in Marxism and atheism. Their views being so foreign to most Louisvillians caused the Bloody Monday riots of 1855, as members of the Know-Nothing Party blocked their ability to vote, creating the worst riot in Louisville history, much of it centered in Butchertown. Also, they opposed Kentucky seceding to the Confederate States of America, and their strong support of Northern causes led to the first German-born mayor of Louisville in 1865, Phillip Tomppert. Even through they were pro-Union, most Germans remained with the Democratic Party as the Republican Party had too many former Know-Nothings as its membership.

== Modern era ==
After 1900, German culture began to die out in Louisville, as many of the German churches switched to preaching in English rather than German. The advent of World War I increased this, forcing German names to either dropped the word "German" from their names (Germany Security Bank became Security Bank, for example), or were completely altered. Even the Louisville libraries got in the act by removing books written in German from their shelves. On March 4, 1938, the long-lasting German newspaper, Louisville Anzeiger, printed its final issue.

In the 21st century, one third of Louisville's population claims German ancestry. The Kentuckiana German Heritage Society was started in 1991 to preserve Louisville's German heritage. The German-American Club Gesangverein, which was founded in 1878, also remains. Since 1977 Louisville has maintained a relationship with Mainz, Germany, with the two cities officially town twinning in 1994. Every October a two-day Oktoberfest is celebrated.

== See also ==
- History of Louisville, Kentucky
- History of the Irish in Louisville
