= Prospect, Kentucky =

- City
- Location of Prospect in Jefferson County, Kentucky

- Location within the state of Kentucky Prospect (the United States)
- Coordinates: 38°20′49″N 85°36′37″W
- Country: United States
- State: Kentucky
- Counties: Jefferson, Oldham
- Incorporated: 1974
- Named after: the local railroad station

Area
  - Total: 3.90 sq mi (10.11 km^{2})
  - Land: 3.83 sq mi (9.92 km^{2})
  - Water: 0.073 sq mi (0.19 km^{2})
- Elevation: 495 ft (151 m)

Population (2020)
  - Total: 4,592
  - Estimate (2024): 4,696
  - Density: 1,199/sq mi (462.9/km^{2})
- Time zone: UTC-5 (Eastern (EST))
  - Summer (DST): UTC-4 (EDT)
- ZIP code: 40059
- Area code: 502
- FIPS code: 21-63264
- GNIS feature ID: 2404575
- Website: prospectky.gov

Prospect is a home rule-class city in Jefferson and Oldham counties in the U.S. state of Kentucky. The Jefferson County portion is a part of the Louisville Metro government. The population was 4,592 as of the 2020 census, down from 4,698 at the time of the 2010 census. It is one of the wealthiest communities in Kentucky.

== History ==
The area was first known as "Sand Hill" when it was settled by farmers in the late 18th century. The present community grew up around the "Prospect" railroad station erected by the Louisville, Harrods Creek and Westport Railway c. 1872. The name referred either to the view from the top of the hill or the expected completion of the line (which – owing to the Long Depression – never did reach Westport and collapsed into bankruptcy in 1879). When the post office was established in 1886, the local postmaster named it "Wilhoyte" in his own honor, but the community corrected this within the month.

Although a few luxury residences existed in the area from the late 19th century and the Louisville Railway Company offered hourly electrified-rail trolleys along the former LHC&W line after 1904, it was largely agricultural until the mid-1960s when large-scale high-end subdivisions were built in the area, most notably the Estates of Hunting Creek, which included a golf course. The newest large-scale high-end development, covering almost 600-acres, is Norton Commons.

Prospect incorporated as a city in 1974.

An EF2 tornado struck the town on April 2, 2024, causing major damage.

== Geography ==
Prospect is located in northeastern Jefferson County. A small portion of the city extends north into Oldham County. The city is bordered by the Ohio River to the northwest, by U.S. Route 42 to the southwest, and by Harrods Creek, a tributary of the Ohio, to the south. US-42 is the primary transportation artery running through the area, leading southwest 12 miles (19 km) to downtown Louisville and northeast 29 miles (47 km) to Bedford. According to the United States Census Bureau, Prospect has a total area of 3.9 square miles (10.1 km^{2}), of which 3.8 square miles (9.9 km^{2}) are land and 0.1 square miles (0.2 km^{2}), or 1.85%, are water.

The postal address of "Prospect" (ZIP Code 40059) covers an area far beyond the city limits, extending east as far as the Norton Commons development in the Worthington community.

== Demographics ==
Historical population
Census	Pop.	Note	%±
1980	1,981		—
1990	2,788		40.7%
2000	4,657		67.0%
2010	4,698		0.9%
2020	4,592		−2.3%
2024 (est.)	4,696		2.3%
U.S. Decennial Census

=== 2020 census ===
As of the 2020 census, Prospect had a population of 4,592. The median age was 53.1 years. 18.3% of residents were under the age of 18 and 30.0% of residents were 65 years of age or older. For every 100 females there were 92.5 males, and for every 100 females age 18 and over there were 90.7 males age 18 and over.

99.9% of residents lived in urban areas, while 0.1% lived in rural areas.

There were 1,898 households in Prospect, of which 25.9% had children under the age of 18 living in them. Of all households, 67.6% were married-couple households, 10.2% were households with a male householder and no spouse or partner present, and 18.9% were households with a female householder and no spouse or partner present. About 20.3% of all households were made up of individuals and 12.4% had someone living alone who was 65 years of age or older.

There were 1,983 housing units, of which 4.3% were vacant. The homeowner vacancy rate was 1.9% and the rental vacancy rate was 3.0%.

Racial composition as of the 2020 census
Race	Number	Percent
White	3,942	85.8%
Black or African American	165	3.6%
American Indian and Alaska Native	7	0.2%
Asian	193	4.2%
Native Hawaiian and Other Pacific Islander	0	0.0%
Some other race	49	1.1%
Two or more races	236	5.1%
Hispanic or Latino (of any race)	145	3.2%

=== 2000 census ===
As of the 2000 census, there were 4,657 people, 1,732 households, and 1,423 families residing in the city. The population density was 1,158.4 inhabitants per square mile (447.3/km^{2}). There were 1,847 housing units at an average density of 459.4 units per square mile (177.4 units/km^{2}). The racial makeup of the city was 92.91% White, 3.39% African American, 0.26% Native American, 2.06% Asian, 0.02% Pacific Islander, 0.21% from other races, and 1.14% from two or more races. Hispanic or Latino of any race were 0.64% of the population.

There were 1,732 households, out of which 38.0% had children under the age of 18 living with them, 76.3% were married couples living together, 4.4% had a female householder with no husband present, and 17.8% were non-families. 15.8% of all households were made up of individuals, and 5.1% had someone living alone who was 65 years of age or older. The average household size was 2.69 and the average family size was 3.01.

In the city the population was spread out, with 27.5% under the age of 18, 3.7% from 18 to 24, 23.3% from 25 to 44, 35.5% from 45 to 64, and 10.1% who were 65 years of age or older. The median age was 43 years. For every 100 females, there were 97.2 males. For every 100 females age 18 and over, there were 94.8 males.

The median income for a household in the city was $111,170, and the median income for a family was $124,131. Males had a median income of $100,000 versus $42,159 for females. The per capita income for the city was $51,469. 1.5% of the population and 0.8% of families were below the poverty line.

== Notable people ==
- Bob Atcher (1914–1993) – country music artist
- Ray Burse (born 1984) – soccer player
- Sarah Gorham (born 1954) – poet, essayist, and publisher
- Scott Jennings (born 1977) – American conservative political strategist and writer
- David W. Osborne (born 1964) – Kentucky state politician
- Justin Powell (born 2001) – NBA G League player
- Naomi Wallace (born 1960) – playwright, screenwriter, and poet

== See also ==
- List of cities and towns along the Ohio River
