= Limerick, Louisville =

- Limerick Historic District
- U.S. National Register of Historic Places
- U.S. Historic district
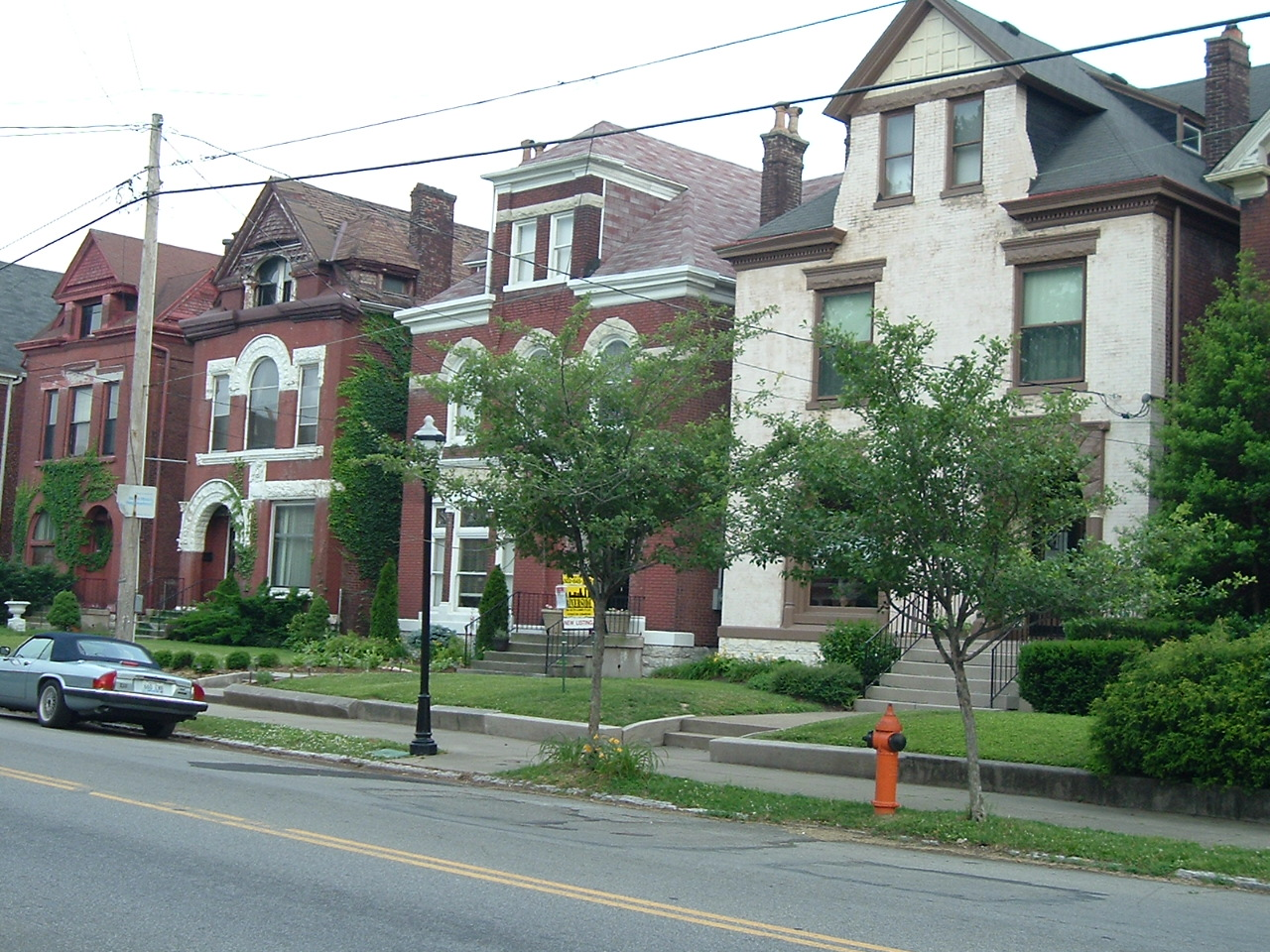
- Large mansion house built by "lace curtain" Irish in the 1890s

- Location within Kentucky Location within the United States
- Location: Between Breckinridge and Oak, 5th and 8th St., Louisville, Kentucky
- Coordinates: 38.23986548°N 85.76286077°W
- Area: 47 acres (19 ha)
- Built: 1860
- Architectural style: Queen Anne, Romanesque, Victorian
- NRHP reference No.: 78001360 (original); 83003715 (increase)

Significant dates
- Added to NRHP: September 13, 1978
- Boundary increase: December 23, 1983

Limerick is a neighborhood one mile south of downtown Louisville, Kentucky, USA.

== History ==
The neighborhood was developed in the 1860s as a place of residence for employees of the Louisville and Nashville Railroad freight yard. It was named because nearly all of the residents were from County Limerick in Ireland. The St. Louis Bertrand Catholic Church was the centerpiece of the newly founded neighborhood. Limerick began the trend of working-class people living southwest of downtown, a trend which continues in the city to this day.

The working class Irish immigrants lived in modest shotgun houses, with a moderate number of African Americans living in the alleyways behind them, while upper income Irish, known as "lace curtain Irish", built mansion houses on St. Catherine Street. The Irish Catholic presence in Limerick was strong enough that from 1872 to 1918 an annual St Patrick's Day march went from the church to Broadway. But as many of the railroad jobs left the area, the Irish began to move to South Louisville.

On October 7, 1871, the Louisville Steam Engine Co. 7 was formed to provide fire protection to the "southern suburbs" of Louisville. Its firehouse at 821 S. 6th Street is the oldest continuously active firehouse in the U.S. On December 10, 2008, Louisville Mayor Jerry Abramson announced his intention to close the firehouse and disband the company on January 1, 2009.

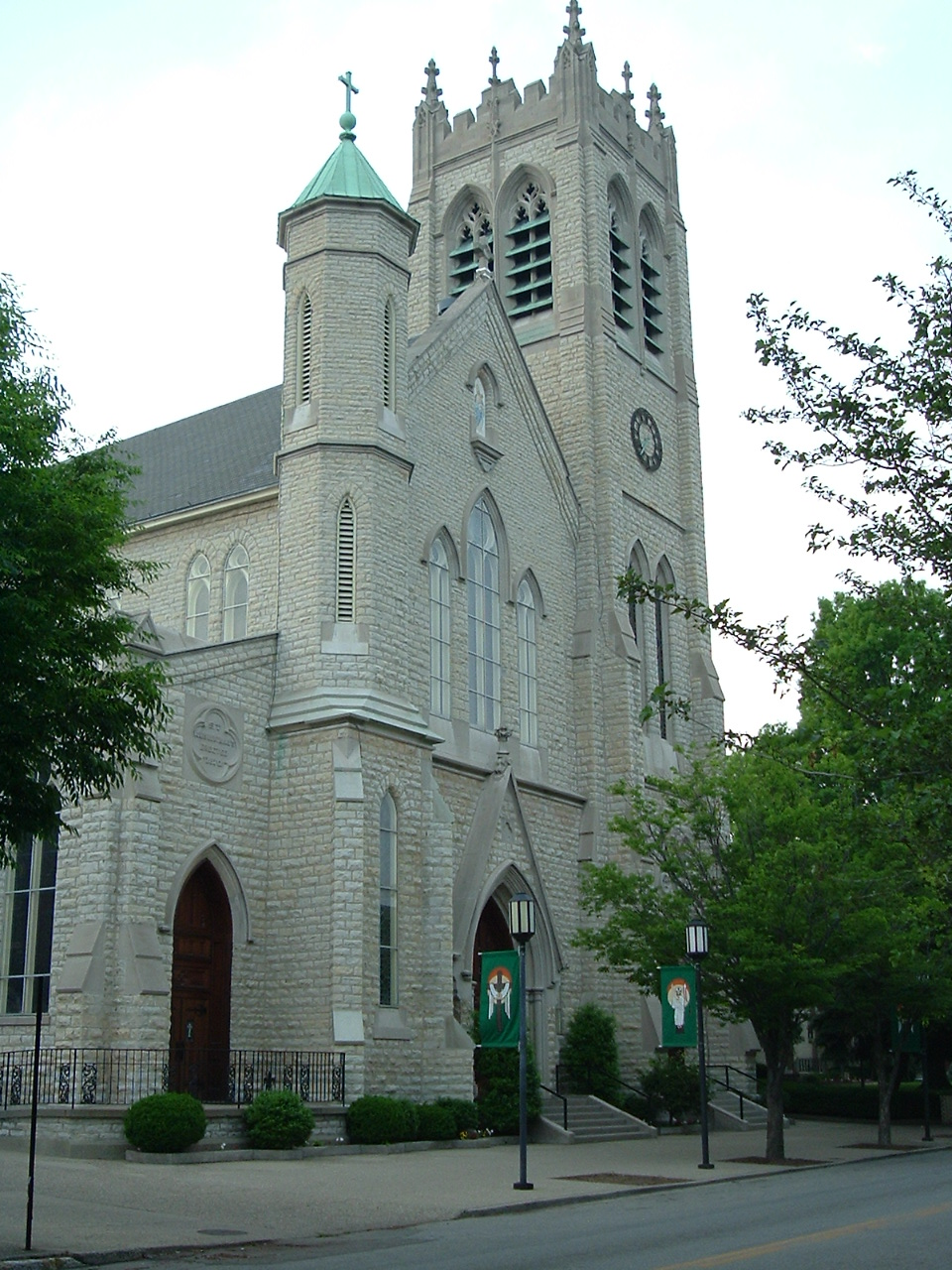
St. Louis Bertrand Catholic Church on 6th Street

As the Irish left, the African Americans moved from the alleyways into the vacated shotgun houses. In 1873, Louisville Central Public School, Kentucky's first state supported public school for African Americans was opened at 6th and Kentucky Streets. It would be later renamed Simmons College and finally Municipal College for Negros, a "colored" campus of the University of Louisville. The school is now in the process of reclaiming its former campus and is officially known as Simmons College of Kentucky.

Beginning around 1874 Limerick was the site of two successive baseball fields, both named Eclipse Park and located at 7th and Kentucky streets (across the street from each other). They were the home of Louisville's major league team, the Louisville Colonels (originally the Louisville Eclipse) from 1882 until the team folded in 1899. It was here that Hall of Famer Honus Wagner made his major league debut on July 19, 1897.

The news weekly Kentucky Irish American would be published from Limerick for nearly seventy years, starting in 1898.

== Historic preservation ==
Today, Limerick is a historic preservation district. It is bounded by Breckinridge Street to the north, 5th street to the east, Oak Street to the south, and the CSX railroad tracks to the west. South of Oak street, the eastern boundary is 7th street until it crosses the railroad tracks.

== Demographics ==
As of 2000, the population of Limerick was 1,448, of which 56.5% are black, 37.7% are white, 3.8% are listed as other, and 2% are Hispanic. College graduates are 17.3% of the population, people without a high school degree are 21.2%. Males outnumber females 63.7% to 46.3%.

== See also ==
- History of the Irish in Louisville
- Irish Hill, Louisville
