= Kentucky Irish American =

Newspaper in Louisville, Kentucky

- Type: Weekly newspaper
- Format: Broadsheet
- Publisher: William M. Higgins
- Founded: July 4, 1898
- Ceased publication: November 30, 1968
- Language: English
- Headquarters: Louisville, Kentucky

The Kentucky Irish American was an ethnic weekly newspaper in Louisville, Kentucky, which catered to Louisville's Irish community.

It was first published on July 4, 1898, founded by William M. Higgins. It was a four-page weekly. Higgins would run the paper until his death on June 9, 1925. He based it in the heavy-Irish neighborhood of Limerick at 319 Green Street, even after the Irish residents began moving away from Limerick to other parts of Louisville.

The Kentucky Irish American was distinctly Irish, and would de facto serve the Catholic community of Louisville. After World War I and the creation of the Irish Free State in 1922, the paper turned to local affairs, specializing in shilling for the Democratic Party. During the 1920s it regularly defended its community from attacks by the second incarnation of the Ku Klux Klan. Other groups that the paper saw as enemies were Great Britain and the Republican Party. It railed against women's suffrage, Prohibition, and the League of Nations. After Al Smith lost the 1928 Presidential election, the newspaper's headline was "Bigotry Won the Day".

After Higgins' death, the Kentucky Irish American became a Barry family publication. John J. Barry was Higgins' first associate, working with him to begin the paper, and continuing it after Higgins' 1925 death. Barry's son, John Michael (Mike) Barry, ran it after John J.'s death in 1950 until the end of the paper's run. Mike's brothers and wife helped to publish it, and it was distributed by Mike's brother Joseph's children. It was during Barry's time that the annual Saint Patrick's Day edition would be printed with green ink. In 1934 Mike began a back-page sports section, which remained in the paper, save during the hiatus caused by World War II.

The 1930s saw the Kentucky Irish American regularly defend Franklin Delano Roosevelt's New Deal policies. During World War II the paper routinely published columns written by various Barry family members who were serving in the military. In the 1960s the paper routinely defended the New Frontier policies of John F. Kennedy and criticize The Courier-Journal and Kentucky governor A. B. Chandler. The paper saw wide distribution outside Louisville. Roosevelt and Harry Truman both subscribed to the paper, and the sportscaster Red Smith said that the Kentucky Irish American was "all the excuse a man needs for learning to read".

The newspaper's offices were moved from Limerick to Breckenridge Street in 1966, but interest in the paper still waned. The final issue was published on November 30, 1968. Mike Barry became a sports writer for The Louisville Times and commentated on sports for both WAVE television and radio. Following his death in 1992, he was inducted into the Kentucky Journalism Hall of Fame on April 10, 2000.

The University of Louisville has copies of almost all issues of the Kentucky Irish American, held on sixteen reels of microfilm due to the paper's fragility.

== Notes ==
See also The Irish in Louisville, M.A. Thesis University of Louisville, 1974 by Stan Ousley Jr.
