= Transit Authority of River City =

Transportation provider in Kentucky, United States

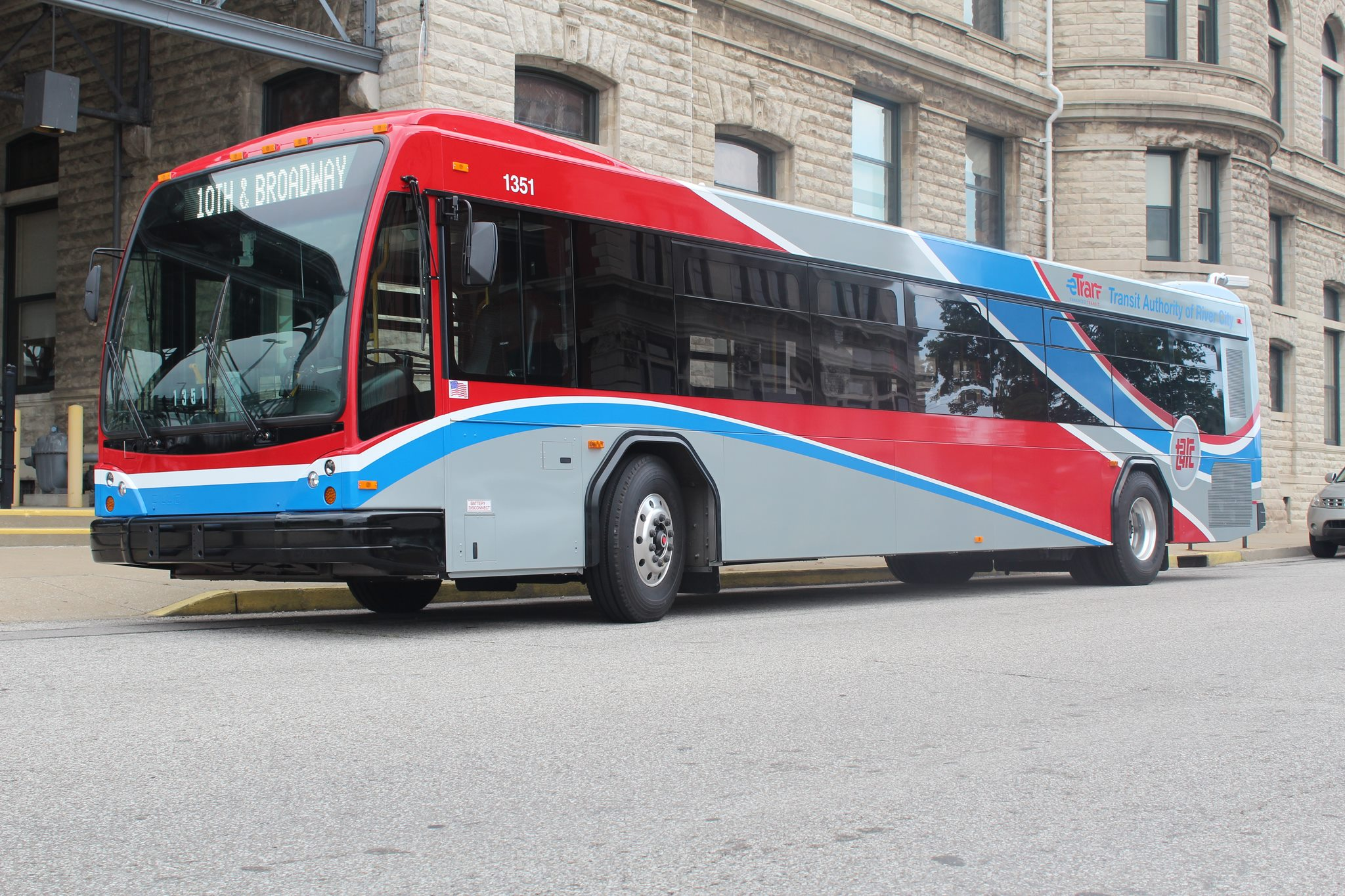
- TARC 2013 Gillig BRT
- Founded: 1974
- Headquarters: 1000 W. Broadway; Louisville, Kentucky 40203
- Locale: Louisville, Kentucky, U.S.
- Service area: Louisville Metro and southern Indiana
- Service type: Bus service
- Routes: 15 (includes one BRT line)
- Stops: 1,430
- Hubs: 1
- Fleet: 227
- Daily ridership: 20,800 (weekdays, Q1 2026)
- Annual ridership: 6,544,600 (2025)
- Fuel type: ULSD and electricity
- Chief executive: Ozzy Gibson
- Website: ridetarc.org

The Transit Authority of River City (TARC) is the major public transportation provider for Louisville, Kentucky and parts of southern Indiana, including the suburbs of Clark County and Floyd County. TARC is publicly funded and absorbed private mass-transit companies in Louisville, the largest of which was the Louisville Transit Company. In 2025, the system had a ridership of 6,544,600 (about 20,800 per weekday as of the first quarter of 2026).

TARC began bus operations in 1974. In 2023, it operated a fleet of 227 accessible buses which run year-round.

== History ==
TARC was created in 1971 after 1970 legislation authorized city and county governments to operate mass-transit systems with local funding. At the time, public transit was provided in Louisville by the private Louisville Transit Company. The company had long operated mass-transit lines in the city, converting from electric trolleys to diesel buses in the late 1940s and changing its name from the Louisville Railway to the Louisville Transit Company in 1947.

Following a trend in cities across the United States, the company saw annual ridership decline from 84 million in 1920 to 14 million in 1970. Its ridership was no longer large enough to cover operating expenses, and in 1971 it posted its first loss. In 1972, the company announced that it would cease operations on September 1, 1974.

The local government began subsidizing fares in July 1973, but this was not enough to make the Louisville Transit Company profitable. Bridge Transit Company (which provided mass transit between Louisville and Jeffersonville) ceased operations at around the same time due to lack of revenue, setting the stage for a metropolitan area without any private mass-transit companies.

Voters approved a controversial 1974 referendum, supported by Mayor Harvey Sloane, which approved an increased occupational tax to fund mass transit. Combined with a federal grant, this was enough for TARC to purchase the Louisville Transit Company, buy new buses, reduce fares, and create new service lines. TARC bought up the area's remaining mass-transit companies: Blue Motor Coach Lines (which served outlying areas) in 1976, and the Daisy Line (connecting New Albany and Louisville) in 1983.

In 1993, TARC experimented with water-taxi service connecting the Belle of Louisville wharf and Towboat Annie's Restaurant in Jeffersonville. A feasibility study for a light rail system in the Louisville area was funded by TARC in 1996 and proposed a north–south route that followed the Interstate 65 corridor that was adopted in 1998. The project's draft environmental impact statement was submitted to the Federal Transit Administration, but was not recommended for final design due to a lack of clear state or local funding for the $661 million cost. TARC paused its planning and engineering work on the light rail line in May 2004.

In February 1994, an audit committee headed by Bruce Lunsford found that TARC had been mismanaging funds and was depleting its once-large trust fund with increasing expenses such as door-to-door service for the disabled and spending on personal services and fringe benefits for administrators which was higher than that of transit companies in similarly sized cities. TARC's executive director resigned after the audit, and fares nearly doubled before the end of the year. In August 2011, TARC's new $4.5 million, 17,700-square-foot Maintenance and Training Annex received a Gold LEED (Leadership in Energy and Environmental Design) Certification.

TARC began to purchase hybrid buses in 2004, and began purchasing ultra-low-sulfur diesel buses by 2008; by late winter 2012–2013, the company added 16 ULSD buses. Eleven hybrids were added by midsummer 2013, bringing TARC's hybrid total to 32. The company added 21 ULSD buses that fall, and 12 more the following fall; some are equipped with WiFi. Thirteen more updated buses were due to arrive by late 2016, increasing the company's ULSD fleet to 95. Electric buses began operation in downtown Louisville in early 2015 and, according to the Courier Journal, share the 8th Street charging station with a trolley route. There is another charging station in downtown Louisville, at 3rd and York Streets. The 30-passenger buses can operate for up to two hours on a charge and, like the old trolleys, are fare-free. On November 5, 2019, TARC observed its 45th anniversary; since 2016, the company has added 45 ULSD buses and one hybrid. On January 6, 2020, TARC introduced Kentucky's first bus rapid transit line.

TARC purchased and took delivery of 72 clean diesel buses during FY 2022. TARC purchased 8 more electric buses that were expected to be delivered in the fourth quarter of FY 2024. These 80 buses were to replace 80 older buses that had been in service since the mid-2000s. The agency launched an updated real-time locator system for its buses in 2025 alongside upgrades to on-board passenger information screens with audio and visual announcements. The TARC network underwent a major restructuring in August 2026 that decreased the number of routes from 24 to 15 and cut nearly half of its 3,300 bus stops. The plan was enacted in response to budget issues and low ridership. A new Downtown Transfer Center at Muhammad Ali Boulevard and 8th Street opened along with the new routes, which were designed to allow for "pulsed" transfers. Under the new network, most routes have frequencies of every 15 to 30 minutes.

== Services ==
TARC operates buses which serve the Louisville area. The TARC network has 1,430 bus stops. The stops are served by 15 routes. The daily routes are named for the primary road on which they run.

Since 1999, it has operated a shuttle service for the University of Louisville's main campus. The company operates two routes shuttling workers to Worldport, the hub of United Parcel Service and one of Louisville's largest employers. TARC launched a "Ride to Safety" program in 2007, which allows domestic abuse victims to use its buses for transportation to a shelter.

TARC and its predecessor had provided shuttle access to the Kentucky Derby and Kentucky Oaks since the 1950s, but in 2008 new federal rules required Churchill Downs to negotiate with private companies for service. The shuttle operation transported tens of thousands of people each year and provided TARC with over $200,000 of annual revenue. TARC provides service to other local events, including Thunder Over Louisville and the Kentucky State Fair.

It began a "Bikes on Board" program in 2001, and two-to-three-bicycle bike racks had been installed on all its full-size buses by 2004. In 2005, TARC reported that an average of 6,000 riders a month used the bike racks.

=== Bus rapid transit ===
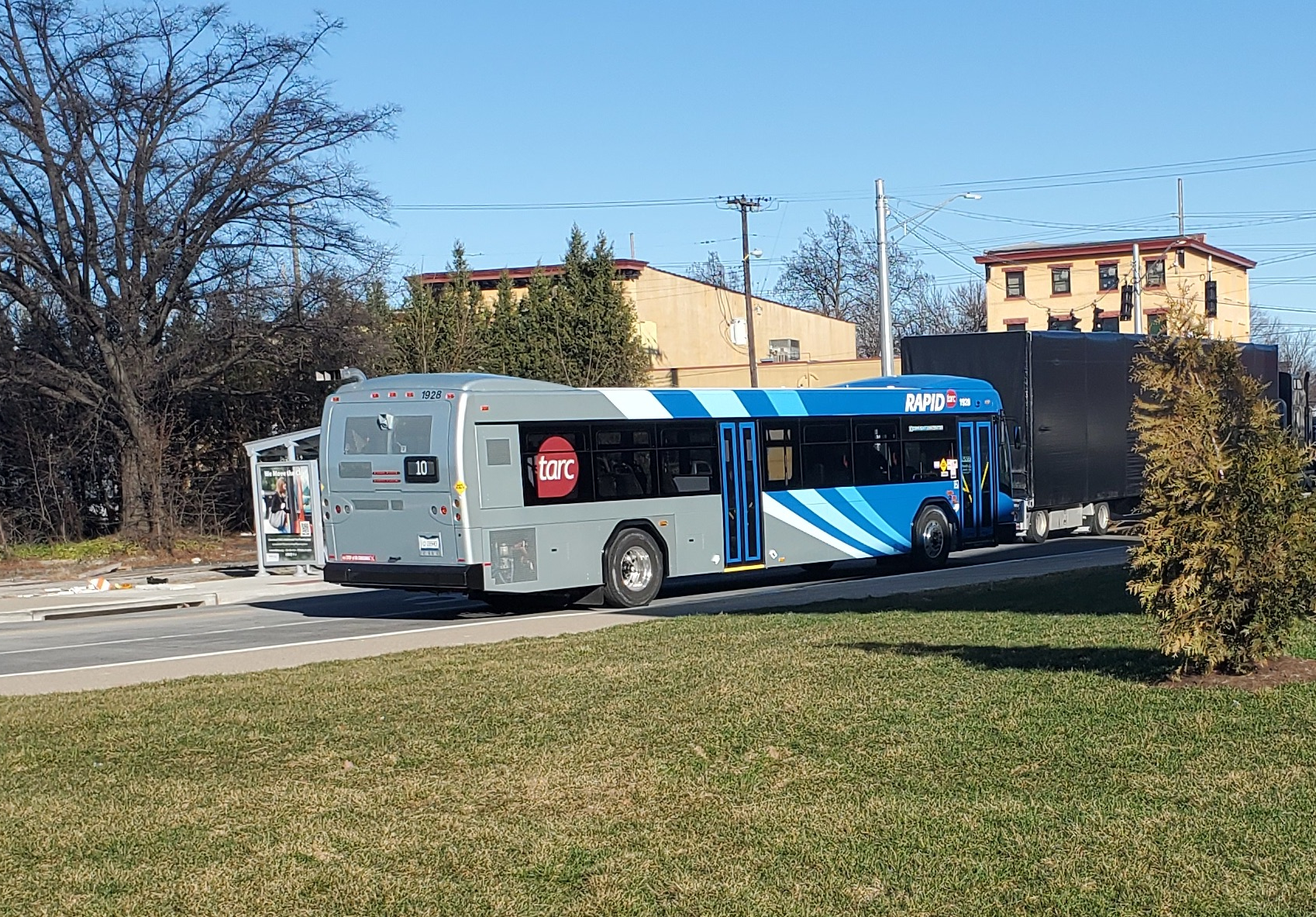
One of 11 BRT buses on the TARC Rapid line

Dixie Rapid is a bus rapid transit line that runs from Downtown Louisville to Dixie Highway. The line began operating on January 6, 2020, and is Kentucky's first bus rapid transit route. It has 37 stops and a dedicated fleet of 11 silver-and-blue buses. Service is every 15–30 minutes, 20 hours a day, seven days per week. The route was created as part of the $35 million New Dixie Highway project.

=== TARC On-Demand ===
On April 1, 2024, TARC launched a six-month on-demand pilot program in New Albany, Indiana. A second service zone was launched in Jeffersontown, Kentucky, the following month.

== Fares ==
As of 2026, the adult fare on TARC fixed route buses is $2.25; a discounted fare of $1.00 is available for children, senior citizens, people with disabilities, and Medicare cardholders. TARC offers passes for unlimited rides within one day, one week, and one month that begin at first use. The agency's smart card, named the MyTARC Card, launched in January 2019 and allows users to load fares as well as passes. A smart-card youth summer pass became available in late May 2019.

Mobile ticketing first became available July 1, 2019, through a 13-day pilot program on a single route. TARC formally launched a mobile ticketing app through Token Transit on April 23, 2024. Since April 1, 2025, University of Louisville students and employees are required to download the Token Transit app in order to utilize their student passes to board the bus.

== Administration ==
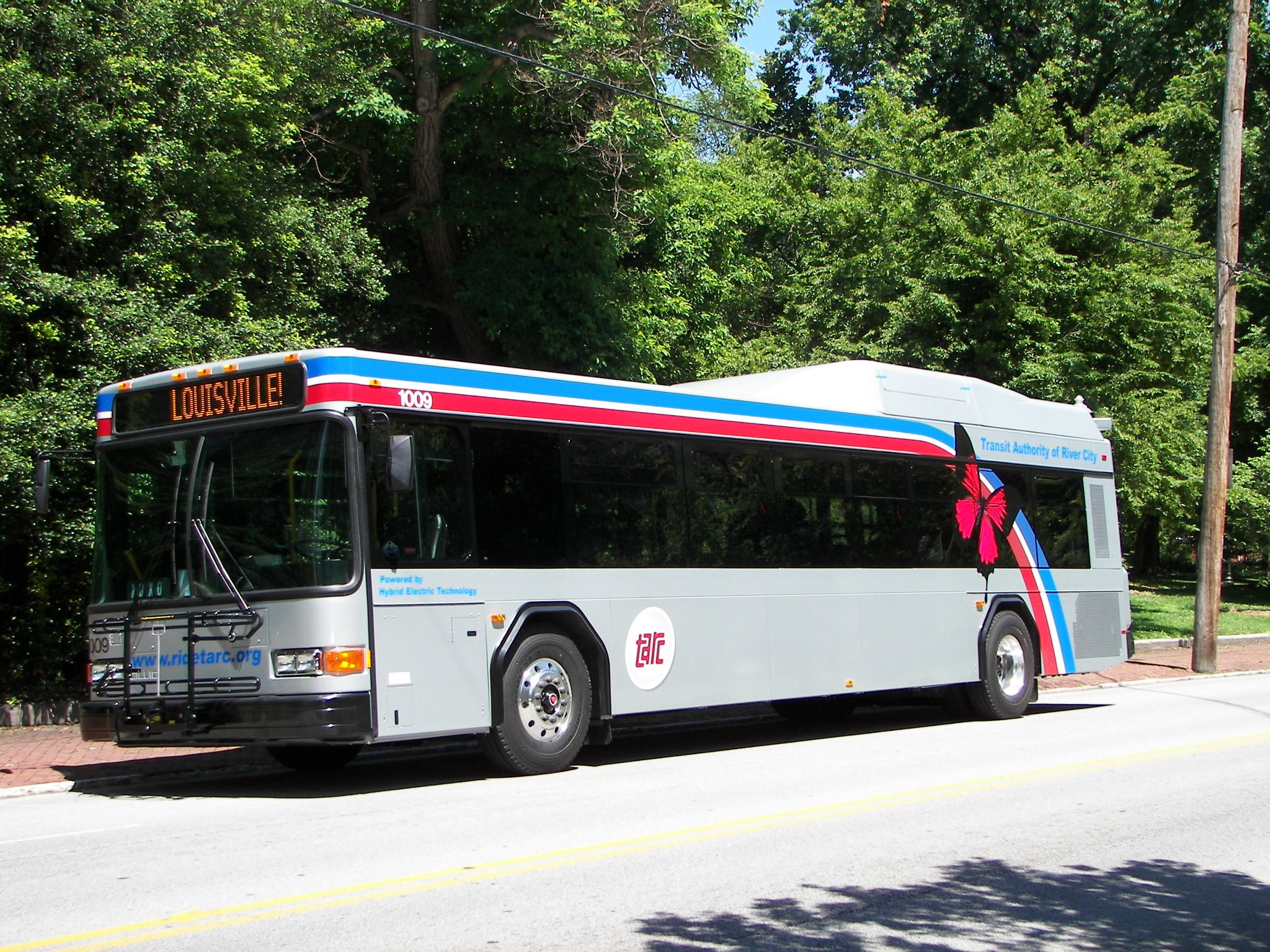
TARC 2010 Gillig Low Floor hybrid

TARC purchased Louisville's Union Station for $2 million in 1977, the year after the former train station had ceased rail operations. The train yard was replaced with a large maintenance facility for TARC buses, and the former train station is now TARC's administrative headquarters. In 2003, TARC significantly remodeled Union Station for the first time since it purchased the facility; the renovation cost $2.1 million.

An eight-member board administers TARC, which had a budget of $67.8 million for the 2008–09 fiscal year. Fares cover only about 12 percent of the company's operating expenses; the rest is from Jefferson County's occupational tax, federal aid, and minor sources. The occupational tax, 0.002 percent, covers about two-thirds of TARC's annual operating expenses; the total varies with the availability of federal grants and fares collected. TARC had 710 employees in 2002, 460 of whom were bus drivers.

Some funding is from a TARC transportation trust fund. The fund contained $28 million in 1992, which a local alderman said made TARC the "Cadillac" of America's bus systems. The city unsuccessfully proposed raiding it to fund the Louisville Free Public Library. The fund had declined from $34 million in 1989 to $13 million in 1994, prompting cutbacks and rate hikes that year.

== Fleet ==
TARC had a fleet of 227 buses in 2020, 32 of which were hybrid buses combining a diesel engine and an electric motor at increased cost. The hybrids were provided through federal highway-bill earmarks by U.S. Senator Jim Bunning. A new TARC diesel bus cost $285,000 in 2007, and a hybrid bus cost $504,000; a new ULSD bus currently costs $405,000, and a hybrid costs $600,000. TARC also operates a fleet of 17 electric buses, reducing diesel emissions by 11,000 pounds (5,000 kg).

TARC announced in October 2010 that its hybrid bus fleet would increase to 21 with nine new buses, due to a grant of $3.9 million from the Federal Transit Authority's Clean Fuels Bus and Bus Facilities Program. A previous grant, through the federal stimulus program, paid for nine hybrid buses which arrived in July of that year.

All buses have "kneeling" technology, which makes them easier to board, and a wheelchair lift. TARC once required disabled riders to use a paratransit service which had to be scheduled in advance, but all regular buses were made accessible after protests in 1986.

== See also ==
- List of bus transit systems in the United States
- Transportation in Louisville, Kentucky
- List of roads in Louisville, Kentucky
