= Louisville, Harrods Creek and Westport Railway =

The Louisville, Harrods Creek and Westport Railway was a 19th-century railway company in the U.S. state of Kentucky. Its first president was James Callahan. It was organized by Louisvillian businessmen in 1870, began construction and operation of the 3 ft (914 mm) narrow gauge railway in 1872, and failed in 1879 owing to the era's Long Depression. The line then gave up hope of connecting to Westport or beyond and reincorporated as the more modest Louisville, Harrods Creek and Westport Railroad, which simply continued service along the existing track.

The railroad began at First and River roads in Louisville and ran along Fulton Street. It reached the 8 miles (13 km) to Goose Creek by 1874 and finished construction about 1 mile (1.6 km) above Harrods Creek in 1877. The company charter was amended to permit consolidation with other lines (including a proposed "Westport, Carrollton and Covington Railroad" expansion) but the line's failure ended those plans.

The line was responsible for the settlement and name of the Louisville suburb of Prospect. It later made up part of the Louisville and Nashville network and its former rights-of-way currently form parts of the class-I CSX Transportation system.

== See also ==
- List of Kentucky railroads
- Louisville, Harrods Creek and Westport Railroad
