= Orell, Louisville =

Neighborhood in Louisville, Kentucky

Orell is a neighborhood of Louisville, Kentucky centered along Dixie Highway (US 31W) and Orell Road.

== Geography ==
Orell, Louisville is located at 38°4′31″N 85°53′3″W.
