= Louisville Railway =

Streetcar and interurban in Kentucky

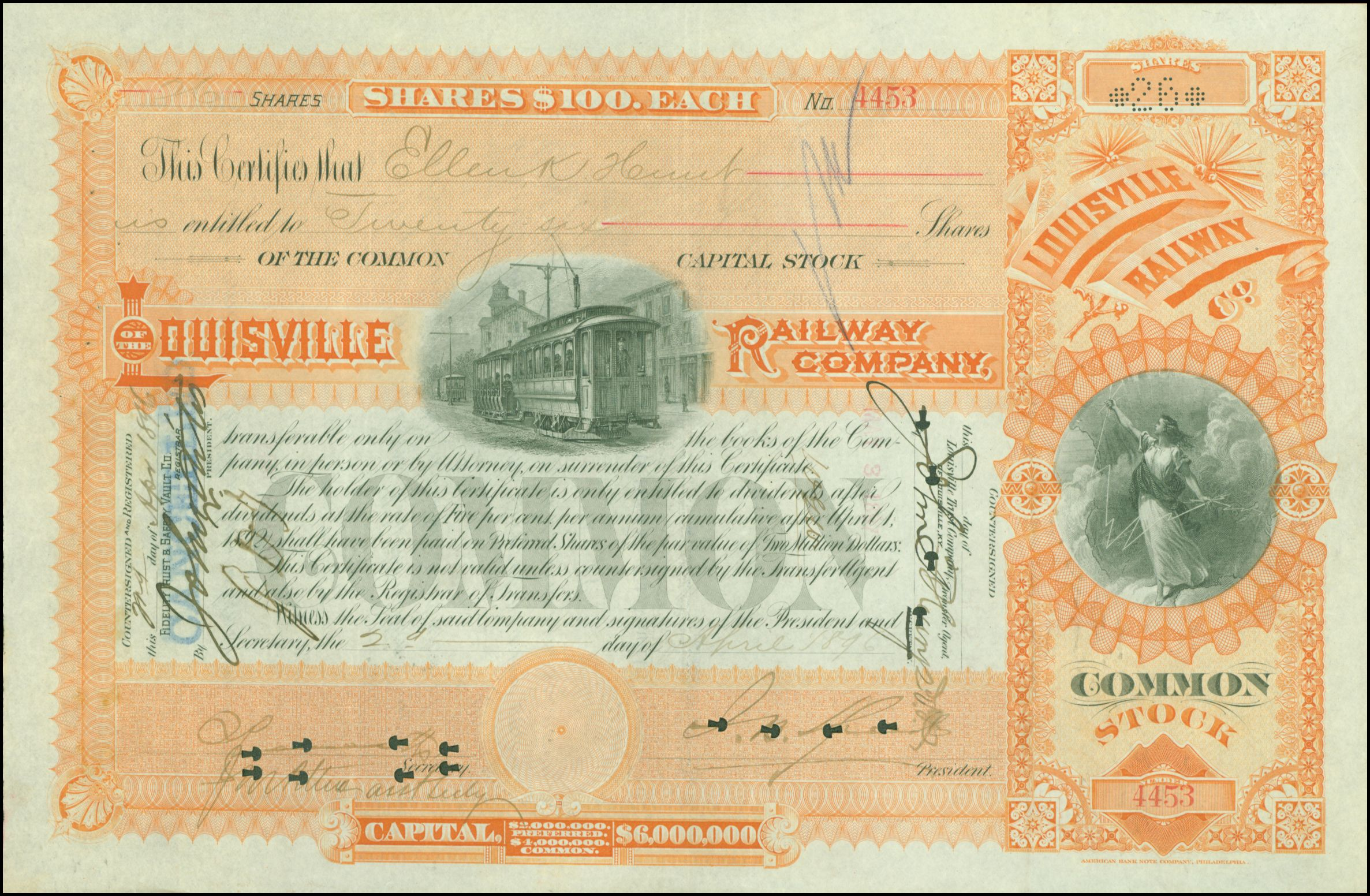
Share of the Louisville Railway Company, issued April 2, 1896

The Louisville Railway Company (LRC) was a streetcar and interurban rail operator in Louisville, Kentucky. It was acquired by Louisville Transit Company in 1951.

== History ==
The Louisville Railway Company began under the name Louisville City Railway in 1859 as a horsecar operator. It slowly acquired other rival companies and was renamed in 1880 following the merger of all Mule operations as the Louisville Railway Company. All tracks were 5 ft (1,524 mm) gauge.

The first electric streetcar line in Louisville opened in 1889 on Green Street, and full electrification of streetcar lines was completed 1901. The Crescent Hill line was the system's last to operate with mule cars. The Louisville & Eastern Railroad opened the first interurban railway in the area in 1901. In 1904, Louisville & Interurban Railroad (L&I), a company owned by Louisville Traction Company, which also owned Louisville Railway Company, opened an interurban line east to Jeffersontown, the first of several lines over the next 6 years.

In 1923, Louisville Railway Company (LRC) formed the subsidiary Kentucky Carriers Inc., which operated the first bus route in Louisville on 3rd Street. This route was not successful and was discontinued within a few months. Additional bus routes created that year and in 1927 were more successful. In 1928, Kentucky Carriers bus routes were transferred to LRC so the subsidiary could rebrand as a solely charter bus operator. In 1934, they took over the Daisy Line service. Meanwhile, L&I's interurban lines were increasingly being abandoned. In 1935, LRC replaced their Orell line with a bus route. The last streetcars in Louisville were replaced in 1948. LRC was sold to the Louisville Transit Company in 1951, one of several operators acquired by Louisville Transit over the next 30 years.

In 2014, Louisville Railway Company was reformed as a non-profit to promote restoration of the Market Street Streetcar Service.

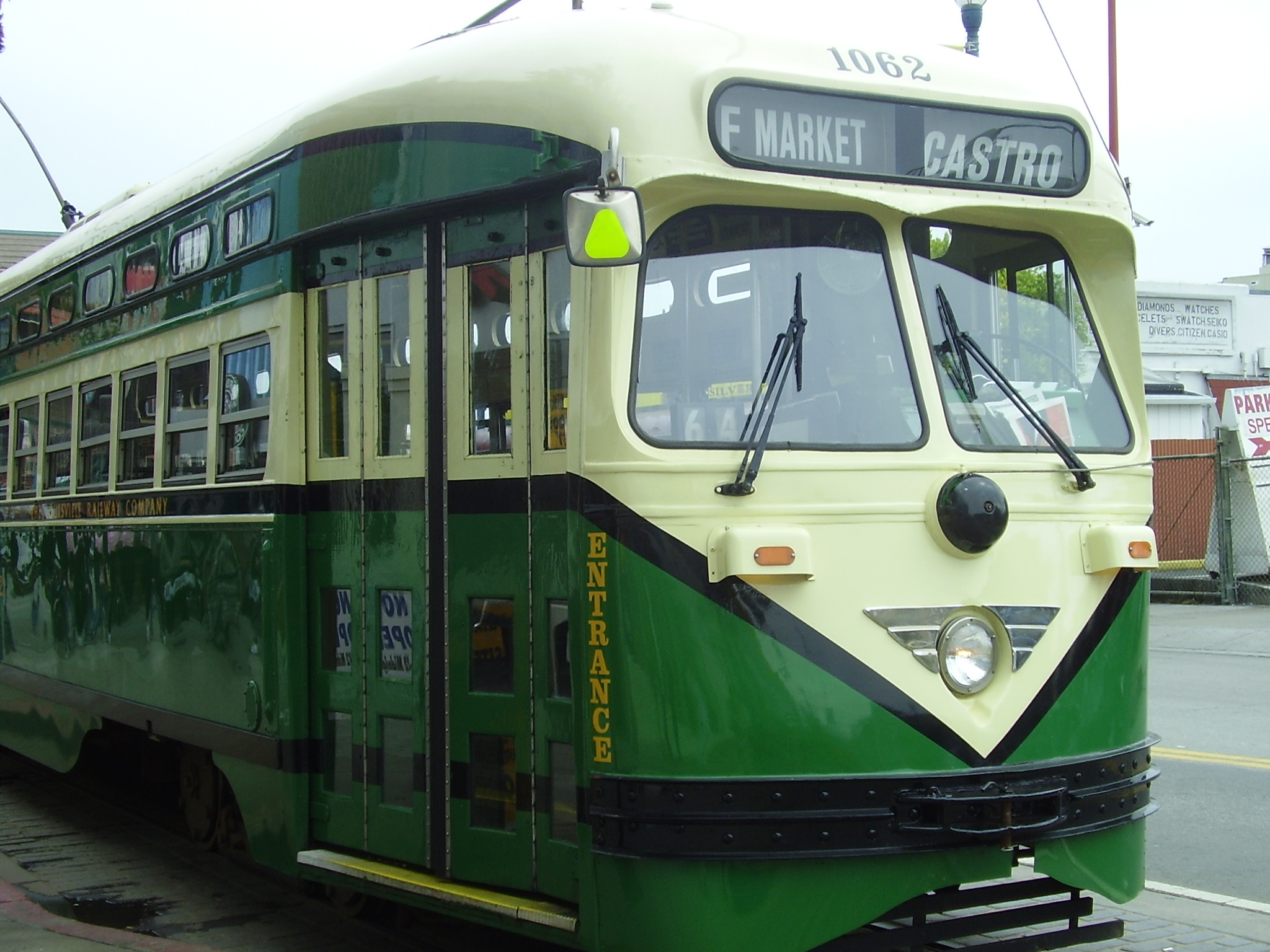
An F Market car painted to represent Louisville Railway Company

== Fleet ==
| Number | Manufacturer | Year | Class |
|---|---|---|---|
| 100 | G. C. Kuhlman Car Company | 1929 | Master Unit |
| 200 | St. Louis Car Company | 1929 | Master Unit |
| 250 | Cincinnati Car Company | 1929 | Master Unit |
| 345–354 | Louisville Railway Company | 1912 | |
| 355–368 | G. C. Kuhlman Car Company | 1924 | |
| 401–477 | J. G. Brill Company | 1922 | Birney |
| 500–537 | Cincinnati Car Company | 1922 | Birney |
| 551–553 | J. G. Brill Company | 1879 | |
| 700–723 | St. Louis Car Company | 1900 | |
| 770–784 | Kuhlman Car Company | | |
| 800–889 | St. Louis Car Company | 1902 | |
| 930–935 | St. Louis Car Company | 1905 | |
| 936–945 | St. Louis Car Company | 1905 | |
| 980–1049 | St. Louis Car Company | 1905 | |
| 1050–1112 | Cincinnati Car Company | 1910 | |

Twenty-five PCC cars numbered 501–525 were ordered from the St. Louis Car Company in 1946 but the order was cancelled before delivery was completed. The Louisville-bound cars were instead sold to the Cleveland Transit System where they became numbers 4250–4274. Car 509 / 4259 was acquired in 1952 by the Toronto Transit Commission (as part of an order of 50 Pullman PCC A11 and 25 St. Louis Car Company A12 cars) and renumbered as 4684; it has since been retired and now owned by Halton County Radial Railway.
