= Harrods Creek, Louisville =

Neighborhood in Louisville, Kentucky

Coordinates: 38°19′35″N 85°37′56″W

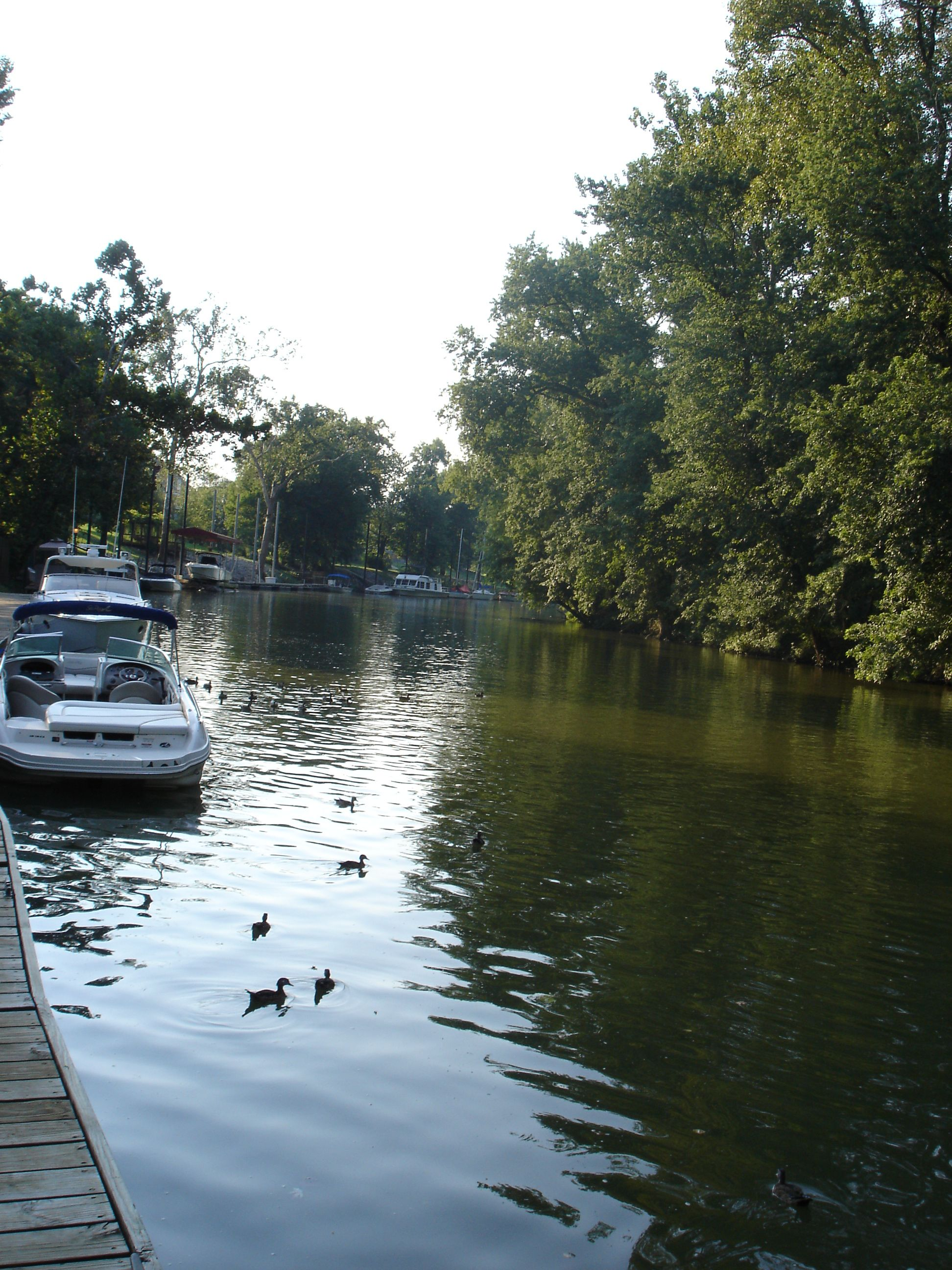
Recreational boating has long been popular in the Harrods Creek area

Harrods Creek is a neighborhood of Louisville, Kentucky centered near Harrods Creek at the intersection of River Road and Wolf Pen Branch Road. It is roughly bordered by the Ohio River to the west and US 42 to the east. Its ZIP code is 40027. Formerly an unincorporated community, it was designated a neighborhood of Louisville when the city merged with Jefferson County in 2003.

== Early history ==
A town was planned by the Transylvania Company, and lots were sold, but a town was not developed. Nevertheless, the area was known as "Seminary Land" for some time. Some development did occur in the area when the Louisville-Westport Pike (later renamed River Road) was built through it. Harrod's Tavern was an early stopping point for boats headed downstream, and the building lives on, heavily rebuilt, as the Captain's Quarters bar and restaurant.

The area is named for Harrods Creek, one of two local creeks. The namesake of the creek is either James Harrod, founder of Fort Harrod (modern Harrodsburg), or Captain William Harrod, an early Louisvillian. The area became agricultural in the early 19th century, primarily selling flour and cornmeal to the nearby market of Louisville.

In 1877, the Louisville, Harrods Creek and Westport Railway reached the area and, owing to the era's Long Depression, never reached beyond it. The line became part of the L&N network in 1881. As with other areas in the Louisville hinterland, improved transportation made Harrods Creek a popular choice for suburban estates by the turn of the century. Prominent Louisville families that built homes here included the Browns and the Hilliards.

George Garvin Brown, founder of the Brown-Forman company, financed the Nitta Yuma ("High Ground") development in the 1890s. Another early enclave was called Ashbourne. The area had a traditional African-American enclave, centered on the area called "The Neck", modern-day Hoskins Beach Road.

== 20th century ==
The community was a mixture of working farms and a few country estates well into the 20th century. Many upper class subdivisions were built in Harrods Creek later in the century, although there was some opposition from earlier residents.

In the 1990s the residents of Harrods Creek opposed a proposal to bisect the community by building the proposed East End Bridge through the area.

== See also ==
- List of rivers of Kentucky
- Geography of Louisville, Kentucky
