= Westport, Kentucky =

Unincorporated community in Kentucky, United States

- Unincorporated community
- Location within Kentucky Location within the United States
- Coordinates: 38°29′14″N 85°28′31″W
- Country: United States
- State: Kentucky
- County: Oldham

Area
  - Total: 1.49 sq mi (3.87 km^{2})
  - Land: 0.81 sq mi (2.09 km^{2})
  - Water: 0.69 sq mi (1.78 km^{2})
- Elevation: 443 ft (135 m)

Population (2020)
  - Total: 253
  - Density: 313.8/sq mi (121.14/km^{2})
- Time zone: UTC-5 (Eastern (EST))
  - Summer (DST): UTC-4 (EDT)
- ZIP code: 40077
- Area code: 502
- GNIS feature ID: 2583509

Westport is an unincorporated community and census-designated place in Oldham County, Kentucky, United States. As of the 2020 census, Westport had a population of 253. Westport has a post office with ZIP code 40077, which opened on November 29, 1815. The community is located along the Ohio River.

== Geography ==
According to the U.S. Census Bureau, the community has an area of 1.499 square miles (3.88 km^{2}); 0.799 square miles (2.07 km^{2}) of its area is land, and 0.700 square miles (1.81 km^{2}) is water.

== Demographics ==
Historical population
Census	Pop.	Note	%±
2020	253		—
U.S. Decennial Census

== Education ==
It is in the Oldham County School District. It operates Oldham County High School.
