= National Register of Historic Places listings in Louisville's West End =

This is a list of properties and historic districts on the National Register of Historic Places in the West End of Louisville, Kentucky. The table below includes 53 listings in the following neighborhoods:

- Algonquin
- California
- Chickasaw
- Park Hill
- Parkland
- Russell
- Shawnee

Latitude and longitude coordinates of the sites listed on this page may be displayed in a map or exported in several formats by clicking on one of the links in the box below the map to the right.

National Register sites elsewhere in Jefferson County are listed separately.

This National Park Service list is complete through NPS recent listings posted July 11, 2025.

== Current listings ==
	Name on the Register	Image	Date listed	Location	Neighborhood	Description
1	B.F. Avery and Sons Industrial District	B.F. Avery and Sons Industrial District	December 21, 1990 (#90001837)	1721-1821 7th St. 38°13′16″N 85°46′23″W	Algonquin	
2	Axton-Fisher Tobacco Company Warehouse	Axton-Fisher Tobacco Company Warehouse	April 18, 2003 (#03000260)	1405 W. Broadway; 38°14′54″N 85°46′32″W	Russell	
3	Wood F. Axton Hall, Simmons University		August 4, 2016 (#16000497)	1811 Dumesnil St. 38°14′11″N 85°47′15″W	Park Hill	
4	Bernheim Distillery Bottling Plant	Bernheim Distillery Bottling Plant	September 8, 1983 (#83002634)	822-828 S. 15th St. 38°14′43″N 85°46′40″W	California	
5	Albert S. Brandeis Elementary School	Albert S. Brandeis Elementary School	December 8, 1980 (#80001594)	1001 S. 26th St. 38°14′35″N 85°47′43″W	California	
6	Brass Finishing Building, Standard Sanitary Manufacturing Company	Brass Finishing Building, Standard Sanitary Manufacturing Company	March 15, 2005 (#05000142)	1547 S. 7th St. 38°13′30″N 85°46′12″W	Algonquin	
7	Broadway Temple A.M.E. Zion Church	Broadway Temple A.M.E. Zion Church	December 8, 1980 (#80001596)	662 S. 13th St. 38°14′53″N 85°46′24″W	Russell	
8	Chestnut Street Baptist Church	Chestnut Street Baptist Church	December 3, 1980 (#80001598)	912 W. Chestnut St. 38°14′59″N 85°46′01″W	Russell	
9	Chickasaw Neighborhood Historic District		September 4, 2024 (#100010764)	Bounded by Broadway, Louis Coleman Jr. Drive, Ohio River, the southern boundary of Chickasaw Park and the Paducah and Louisville Railroad; 38°14′48″N 85°49′15″W	Chickasaw	
10	Christ the King School and Church	Christ the King School and Church	September 8, 1983 (#83002647)	718-724 S. 44th St. 38°14′57″N 85°49′32″W	Shawnee	
11	Church of Our Merciful Saviour	Church of Our Merciful Saviour	September 8, 1983 (#83002648)	473 S. 11th St. 38°15′09″N 85°46′08″W	Russell	
12	Columbian School	Columbian School	September 8, 1983 (#83002650)	1337 Dixie Hwy. 38°14′01″N 85°47′17″W	Park Hill	Currently the Strothers Elementary Apartments
13	Anton Diebold House	Anton Diebold House	September 8, 1983 (#83002653)	4303 W. Broadway; 38°15′03″N 85°49′28″W	Shawnee	
14	J.W. Diebold, Jr. House	J.W. Diebold, Jr. House	September 8, 1983 (#83002654)	4119 W. Broadway; 38°15′02″N 85°49′15″W	Shawnee	
15	Basil Doerhoefer House	Basil Doerhoefer House	September 8, 1983 (#83002657)	4432 W. Broadway; 38°15′00″N 85°49′36″W	Shawnee	
16	Peter C. Doerhoefer House	Peter C. Doerhoefer House	September 8, 1983 (#83002658)	4422 W. Broadway; 38°15′00″N 85°49′33″W	Shawnee	
17	Doerhoefer–Hampton House	Doerhoefer–Hampton House	July 16, 1979 (#79001002)	2422 W. Chestnut St. 38°15′09″N 85°47′35″W	Russell	
18	Dumesnil Street ME Church	Dumesnil Street ME Church	September 8, 1983 (#83002659)	1707 Dumesnil St. 38°14′10″N 85°47′00″W	Park Hill	
19	Fire Department Headquarters	Fire Department Headquarters	November 7, 1981 (#81000283)	1135 W. Jefferson St. 38°15′20″N 85°46′12″W	Russell	
20	Ford Motor Plant	Ford Motor Plant	January 27, 1983 (#83002666)	1400 Southwestern Parkway; 38°14′06″N 85°50′00″W	West End Louisville	
21	Stephen Foster Elementary School	Stephen Foster Elementary School	April 4, 2006 (#06000337)	4020 Garland Ave. 38°14′47″N 85°49′08″W	Chickasaw	
22	Great Atlantic & Pacific Tea Company Bakery & Warehouse		March 14, 2024 (#100010096)	901 S. 15th Street; 38°14′38″N 85°46′38″W		
23	Holy Cross Catholic Church, School and Rectory	Holy Cross Catholic Church, School and Rectory	September 8, 1983 (#83002684)	3112 W. Broadway; 38°14′58″N 85°48′18″W	Russell	
24	Hook and Ladder Company No. 4	Hook and Ladder Company No. 4	November 7, 1980 (#80001603)	2301 Jefferson St. 38°15′28″N 85°47′21″W	Russell	
25	Hook and Ladder Company No. 5	Hook and Ladder Company No. 5	November 7, 1980 (#80001604)	1824 Garland Ave. 38°14′37″N 85°47′08″W	California	
26	Jefferson Branch Louisville Free Public Library	Jefferson Branch Louisville Free Public Library	July 18, 1979 (#79001009)	1718 W. Jefferson St. 38°15′22″N 85°46′46″W	Russell	
27	Knights of Pythias Temple	Knights of Pythias Temple	November 29, 1978 (#78001358)	928-932 W. Chestnut St. 38°14′59″N 85°46′04″W	Russell	
28	Louisville and Nashville Railroad Office Building	Louisville and Nashville Railroad Office Building	September 8, 1983 (#83002696)	908 W. Broadway; 38°14′48″N 85°46′04″W	California	
29	Louisville Free Public Library, Western Colored Branch	Louisville Free Public Library, Western Colored Branch	December 6, 1975 (#75000771)	604 S. 10th St. 38°14′59″N 85°46′05″W	Russell	
30	Marlow Place Bungalows District	Marlow Place Bungalows District	September 8, 1983 (#83002699)	3139 to 3209 W. Broadway; 38°15′00″N 85°48′20″W	Russell	
31	J.B. McFerran School	J.B. McFerran School	September 8, 1983 (#83002703)	1515 Cypress St. 38°13′47″N 85°47′54″W	Algonquin	
32	Mengel Box Company	Mengel Box Company	September 8, 1983 (#83002705)	1247-1299 S. 12th St. 38°14′04″N 85°46′25″W	Park Hill	
33	Parkland Evangelical Church	Parkland Evangelical Church	September 8, 1983 (#83002717)	1102 S. 26th St. 38°14′26″N 85°47′47″W	Parkland	
34	Parkland Historic District	Parkland Historic District	June 4, 1980 (#80001613)	Roughly bounded by railroad tracks, Hale Ave., and S. 26th and S. 30th Sts. 38°14′12″N 85°48′00″W	Parkland	
35	Parkland Junior High School	Parkland Junior High School	September 8, 1983 (#83002718)	2509 Wilson Ave. 38°14′06″N 85°47′44″W	Parkland	
36	J.J. Reilly Manufacturing Building		June 13, 2019 (#100004097)	1234 Rowan St. 38°15′35″N 85°46′15″W		
37	Russell Historic District	Russell Historic District	May 7, 1980 (#80001617)	Roughly bounded by S. 15th, S. 26th, Congress, and W. Broadway Sts.; also the junction of Muhammad Ali Boulevard and S. 17th St. 38°15′20″N 85°47′20″W	Russell	Junction address represents a boundary increase of March 24, 2000
38	St. Anthony's Roman Catholic Church, Rectory, Convent, and School	St. Anthony's Roman Catholic Church, Rectory, Convent, and School	March 1, 1982 (#82002720)	2222-2233 W. Market St. 38°15′30″N 85°47′16″W	Russell	
39	St. Columba Catholic Campus	St. Columba Catholic Campus	April 5, 2005 (#05000143)	3514 W. Market; 38°15′39″N 85°48′33″W	Shawnee	
40	St. George's Roman Catholic Church	St. George's Roman Catholic Church	October 29, 1982 (#82001563)	1809 Standard Ave. 38°13′53″N 85°47′23″W	Park Hill	
41	St. Peter's German Evangelical Church	St. Peter's German Evangelical Church	December 4, 1980 (#80001621)	1231 W. Jefferson St. 38°15′20″N 85°46′16″W	Russell	
42	Shawnee Elementary School	Shawnee Elementary School	November 2, 1984 (#84000275)	4151 Herman St. 38°15′43″N 85°49′08″W	Shawnee	
43	Shawnee High School	Shawnee High School	November 2, 1984 (#84000277)	4015 Herman St. 38°15′43″N 85°48′56″W	Shawnee	
44	Shawnee Neighborhood Historic District		April 15, 2025 (#100011688)	Bounded by the Ohio River to the north and west, I-264 to the East, and Broadway to the south. 38°15′28″N 85°49′08″W	Shawnee	
45	F.M. Tiller House	F.M. Tiller House	September 8, 1983 (#83002741)	4309 W. Broadway; 38°15′03″N 85°49′30″W	Shawnee	
46	Union Station	Union Station	August 11, 1975 (#75000777)	1000 W. Broadway; 38°14′48″N 85°46′08″W	California	
47	Universal Car Company	Universal Car Company	May 2, 2001 (#01000454)	2500 W. Broadway; 38°14′57″N 85°47′38″W	California	
48	Virginia Avenue Colored School	Virginia Avenue Colored School	March 31, 2004 (#04000244)	3628 Virginia Ave. 38°14′21″N 85°48′53″W	Chickasaw	
49	Henry Vogt Machine Company Shop	Henry Vogt Machine Company Shop	February 11, 1982 (#82002727)	1000 W. Ormsby Ave. 38°13′58″N 85°46′15″W	Park Hill	
50	Warehouse A, Brown-Forman Corporation	Warehouse A, Brown-Forman Corporation	April 16, 1990 (#89001144)	1809 Garland Ave. 38°14′40″N 85°47′04″W	California	
51	Wedekind House and Servant's Quarters	Wedekind House and Servant's Quarters	September 8, 1983 (#83002747)	2630 and 2532 W. Burnett St. 38°13′56″N 85°47′57″W	Park Hill	
52	White Mills Distillery Company	White Mills Distillery Company	December 8, 1978 (#78001371)	850 Dixie Hwy. 38°14′42″N 85°47′03″W	California	
53	Whiteside Bakery	Whiteside Bakery	April 24, 1979 (#79001014)	1400 W. Broadway St. 38°14′52″N 85°46′32″W	California	

== See also ==
- National Register of Historic Places listings in Jefferson County, Kentucky
- List of National Historic Landmarks in Kentucky
- List of attractions and events in the Louisville metropolitan area
