= Fontaine Ferry Park =

Former amusement park in Louisville, Kentucky

- Interactive map of Fontaine Ferry Park
- Location: Louisville, Kentucky, U.S.
- Coordinates: 38°15′53″N 85°49′41″W
- Status: Defunct
- Opened: 1905; 1972 (reopened as Ghost Town on the River)
- Closed: May 4, 1969 (as Fontaine Ferry Park); 1975 (as River Glen Park)
- Area: 64 acres (26 ha)

Attractions
- Total: 50
- Roller coasters: 4

Fontaine Ferry Park was an amusement park in Louisville, Kentucky that operated from 1905 to 1969. Located on 64 acres (26 ha) in western Louisville at the Ohio River, it offered over 50 rides and attractions, as well as a swimming pool, skating rink and theatre. The most popular attraction were its wooden roller coasters, of which 4 were built over the years.

It was built on land originally part of Aaron Fontaine's estate and ferry landing, which he bought in 1814, and sold in 1887 to Thomas Landenwich, who built a hotel and other attractions there. The park opened to the public in May 1905. It was located at the western terminus of Market Street (originally Fontaine Ferry Road) at what is now Southwestern Parkway in Louisville's Shawnee neighborhood.

Until the 1940s, visitors could travel to the park by steamboat from Downtown Louisville.

For nearly 60 years the park was off-limits to the city's African Americans. When the West End became integrated in the 1960s, the park remained as a constant reminder of Jim Crow to African Americans. The park became racially integrated in 1964. On May 4, 1969, the first day of Fontaine Ferry's operating season, a race riot broke out during which the park was heavily vandalized. Fontaine Ferry Park did not reopen after the riot. The nearby Shawnee neighborhood had also been integrated, and white flight was occurring heavily there, especially after the 1968 riots in the West End. The park was sold in 1969, and renamed Ghost Town on the River in 1972, then River Glen Park in 1975, its last season. Following several fires, the city purchased it in 1981. The 1910 carousel was relocated to Marriott's Great America near Chicago the next year and reopened as the Ameri-Go-Round.

Fontaine Ferry has been cited bitterly as a reminder of racial segregation in Louisville. It was located between two public parks and, prior to racial integration, one was designated for Whites (Shawnee Park) and the other for Blacks (Chickasaw Park).

It is now the site of a residential development called Fontaine Estates, where houses were first sold in 1996. The $1.2 million Shawnee Park Sports Complex was built on the former Fontaine Ferry site in 1997.

== See also ==
- History of Louisville, Kentucky
- List of attractions and events in the Louisville metropolitan area
- Rose Island (amusement park)
- West End Community Council
