= Albert S. Brandeis Elementary School =

- U.S. National Register of Historic Places
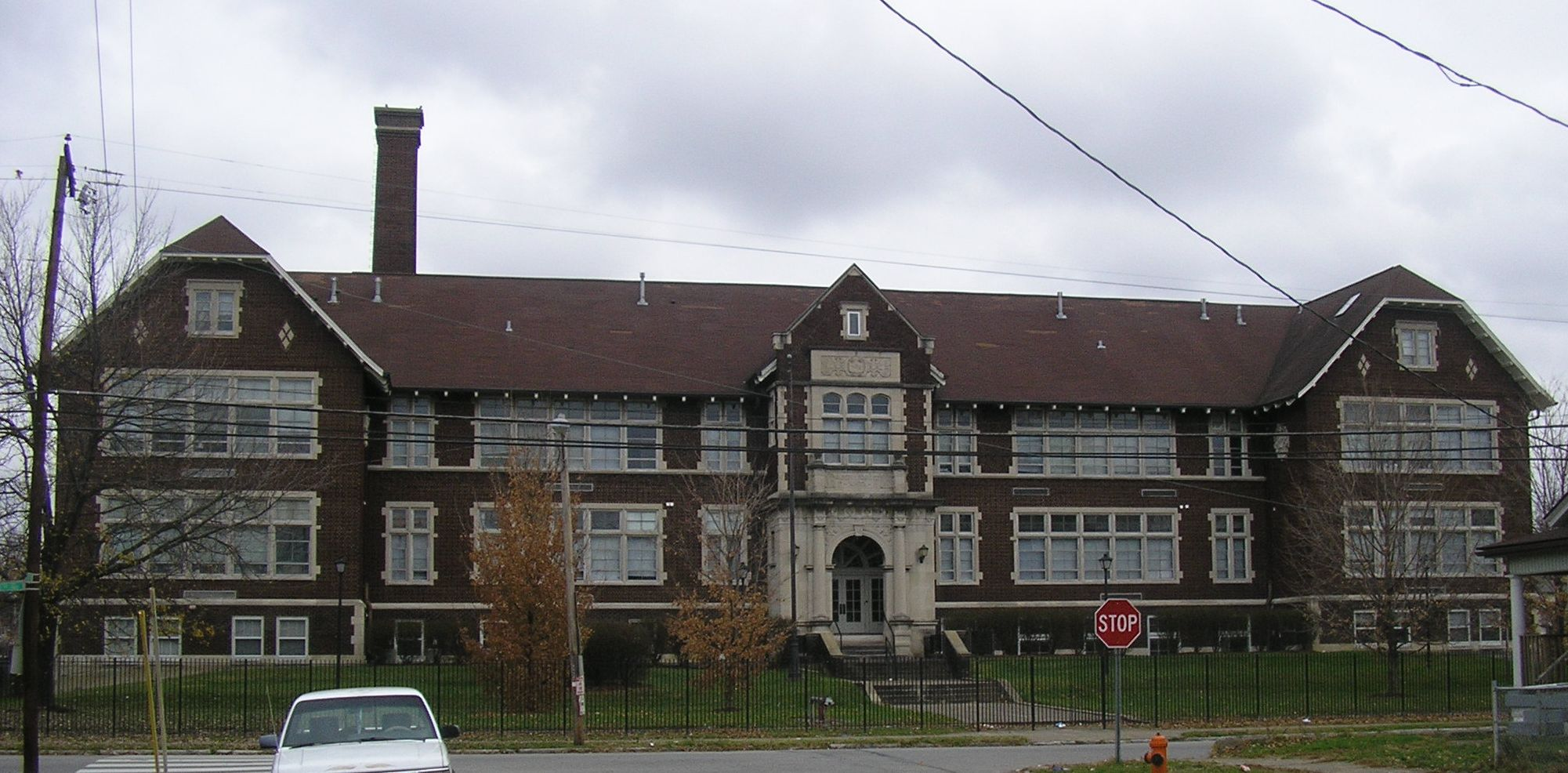
- Brandeis Elementary School in 2009

- Location within Kentucky Location within the United States
- Location: 1001 S. 26th Street; Louisville, Kentucky
- Coordinates: 38°14′35″N 85°47′43″W
- Area: less than one acre
- Built: 1913
- Architect: J. Earl Henry
- Architectural style: Tudor Revival
- NRHP reference No.: 80001594
- Added to NRHP: December 08, 1980

Albert S. Brandeis Elementary School is a former elementary school in Louisville, Kentucky that began operation in 1913. It is listed as a historic building with the National Register of Historic Places. It was patterned after the Charlton House in England. It was designed by J. Earl Henry, a renowned early 20th century Louisville architect.

The historic building is located at 1001 South 26th Street. The school itself operates at 2817 W. Kentucky St. in a modern facility. It became a math/science/technology magnet school in fall 1990. It was Louisville's first magnet program in an elementary school.

== Design ==
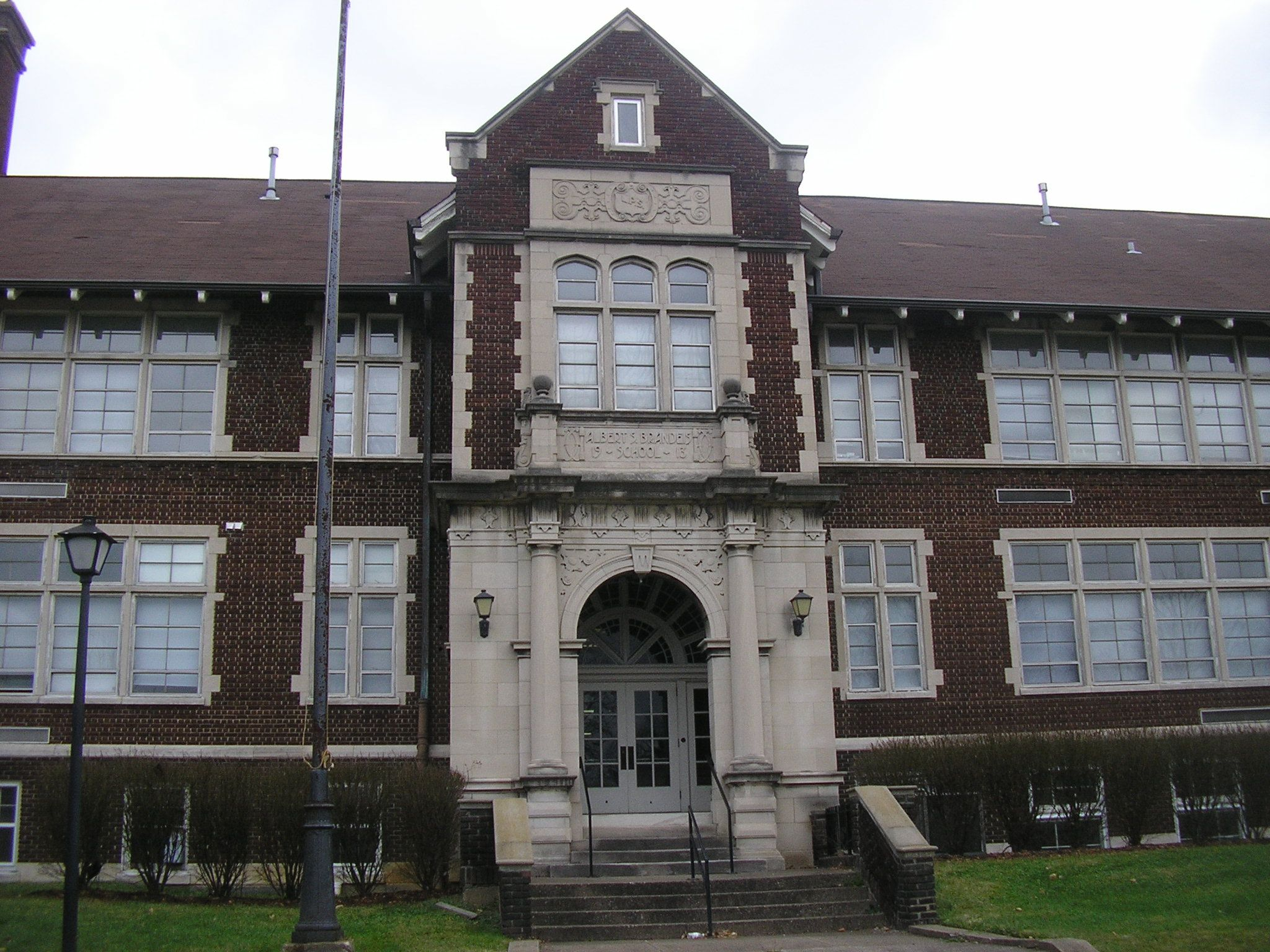
Detail of main entrance

The original school building occupies a city block between the Parkland and California neighborhoods. It is built of brick and has 2½ stories as well as a raised basement. The windows on the first and second floor are identical. A decorative gabled entrance spans the height of the building and includes a decorative scroll which reads "L.P.S." for Louisville Public School (the predecessor of Jefferson County Public Schools).

The building is designed in the Tudor Revival architecture style, although the entrance includes Gothic elements. Architect J. Henry Earl was heavily influenced by Robert Smythson, especially his designs for Wardour Castle and Charlton House.

A modestly styled addition was added to the back of the building in 1954. The elaborate original windows were replaced in 1962 steel frame vent windows.

== History ==
Brandeis was one of the first schools built under the Louisville Independent School District, which spent equally in rich and poor neighborhoods, accounting for the large and stylish building in a working-class neighborhood.

The school was named after Albert S. Brandeis, who was one of the founders of the Louisville Board of Education.

In 1990, the school board announced Brandeis would be leaving its old building because it was too small and maintenance costs were too high. At the time, its principal said "The building has a lot of charm, but we've outdated it. Most of the major systems are in constant need of repair." A new 6-acre (24,000 m^{2}) site was selected a few blocks away, which was previously the location of about 20 houses and some small businesses.

The move was completed in 1992. At the time, city officials hoped to buy the building and convert it to housing. The city bought the property in 1993 for $220,000. The property was used for public meetings in the mid-1990s as various plans were proposed to convert it to a new use. A non-profit group built a day care center on the original school property, behind the school building, in 1995.

However, the property suffered during this time, as parts of the roof caved in and vandals repeatedly struck. In 1996, it was finally converted to 50 private apartments. It was converted by the same not-for-profit group, New Directions Housing Corporation, that turned Theodore Roosevelt Elementary School in Portland into apartments. It continues to be an important landmark in its neighborhood. The building now includes 50 apartments, an after school Learning Center and community garden.

== See also ==
- Public schools in Louisville, Kentucky
- National Register of Historic Places listings in Louisville's West End
