= Universal Car Company =

- U.S. National Register of Historic Places
- Location within Kentucky Location within the United States
- Location: 2500 W. Broadway, Louisville, Kentucky
- Coordinates: 38°14′57″N 85°47′38″W
- Area: 0.8 acres (0.32 ha)
- Built: 1923
- Architectural style: Late 19th And Early 20th Century American Movements, Commercial
- NRHP reference No.: 01000454
- Added to NRHP: May 2, 2001

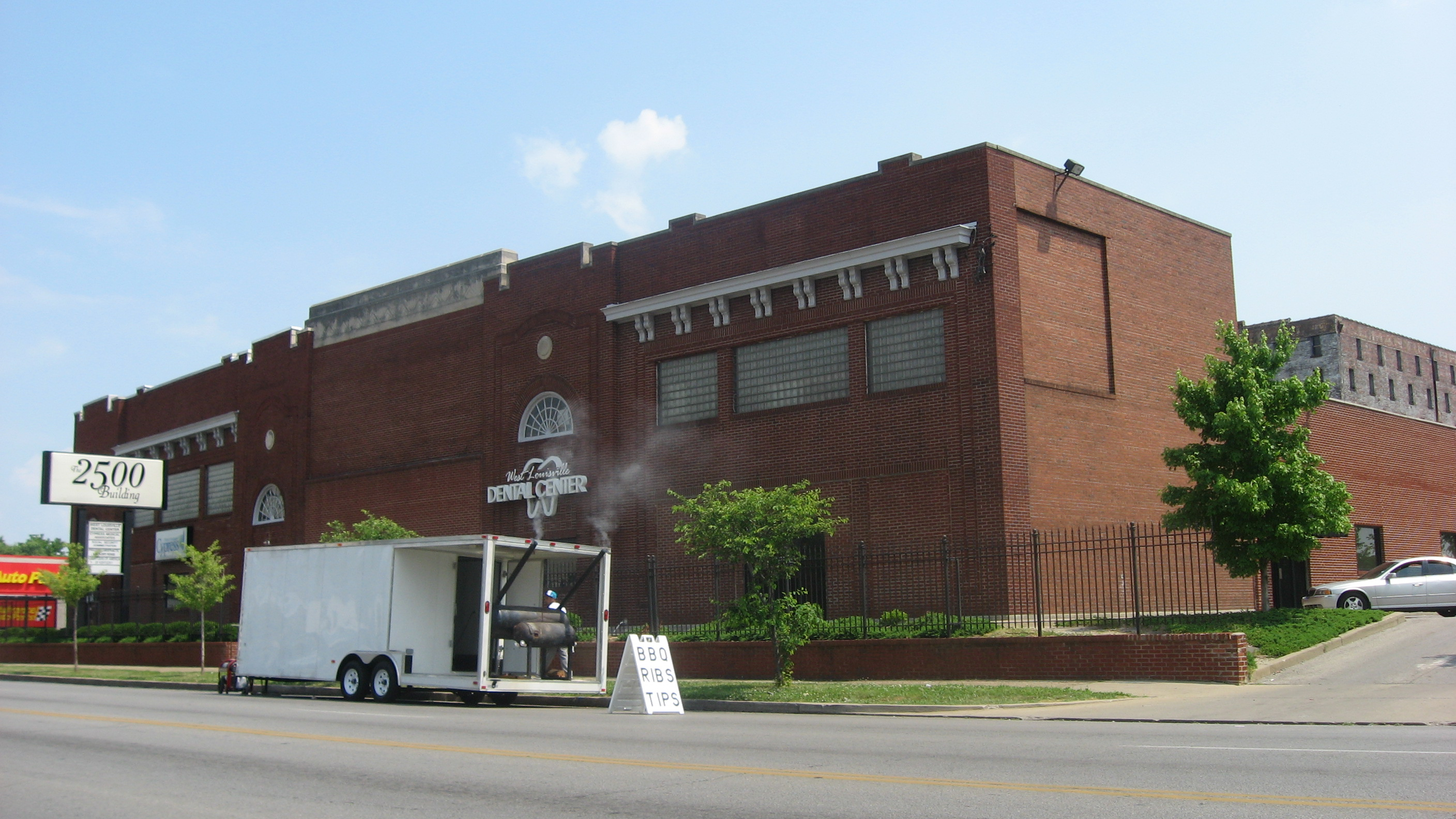
Universal Car Company

The Universal Car Company, at 2500 W. Broadway in the California neighborhood of Louisville, Kentucky, was built in 1923. It was listed on the National Register of Historic Places in 2001.

It is a two-story brick building. Also known as the Universal Chevrolet Company Building, it was one of Louisville's first dedicated new car sales showrooms.

== See also ==
- Third Street Motor Car Company Building: NRHP listing in Newport, Kentucky
- National Register of Historic Places listings in Louisville's West End
