= Riverside Gardens, Louisville =

Neighborhood in Louisville, Kentucky

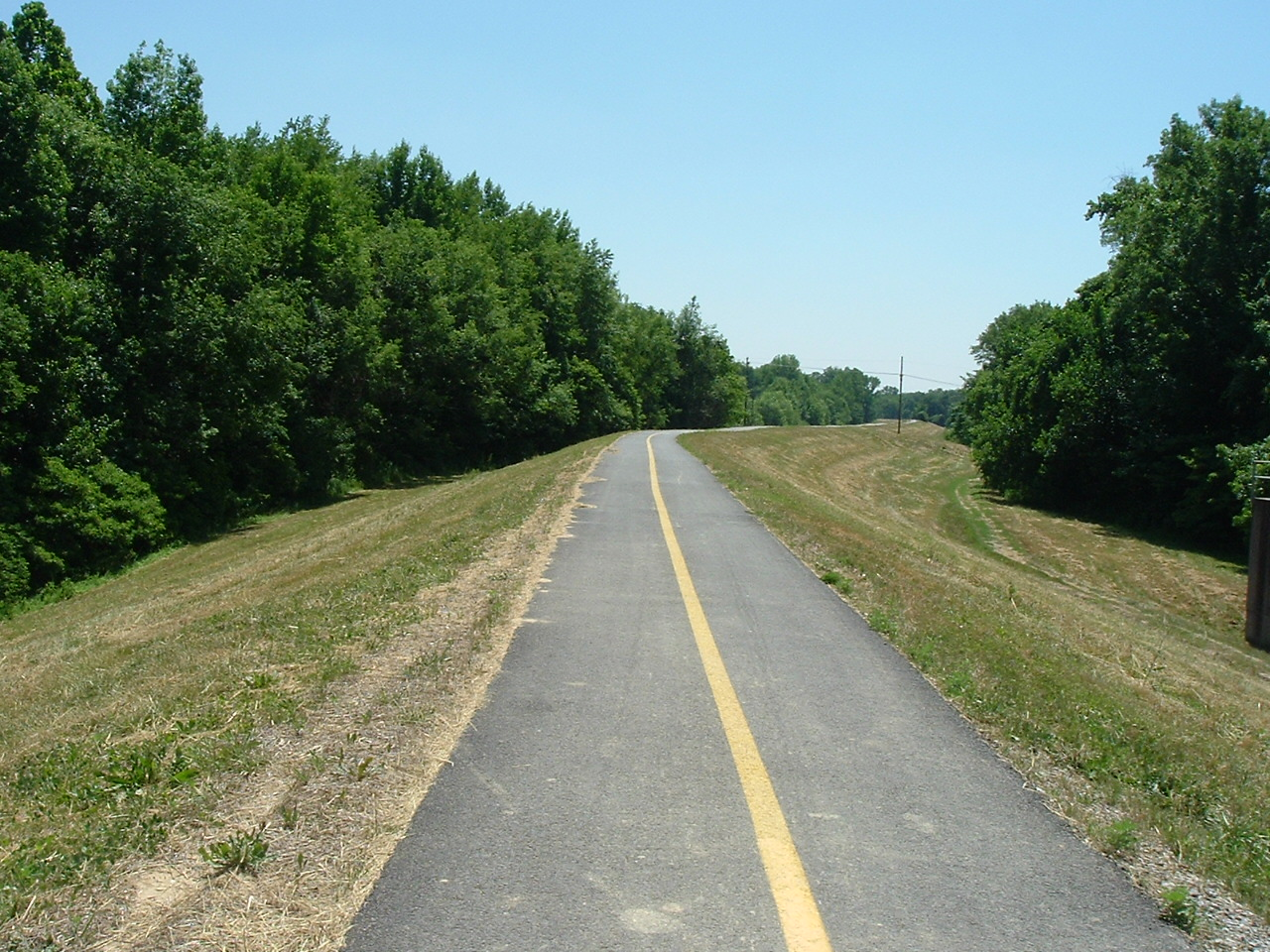
The first completed stretch of a planned 110 mile-long bike loop around Louisville, Kentucky, near Riverside Gardens

Riverside Gardens is a neighborhood of Louisville, Kentucky centered along Campground Road and Lees Lane. In 2007, the first stretch of the proposed 110-mile Louisville Loop bike and pedestrian trail was completed to Lees Lane in Riverside Gardens from Riverview Park. The project included a $2 million bridge over Mill Creek. The concrete trail is expected to be connected to Shawnee Park by spring of 2008. In the future, a wharf and riverfront park is planned for Riverside Gardens.

As of 2000, Riverside Gardens had an estimated population of 1,238.

== Geography ==
Riverside Gardens, Louisville is located at 38°11′25″N 85°52′10″W.
