= West End Community Council =

The West End Community Council in Louisville, Kentucky, was an open housing organization that was founded in 1945 and remained active until 1970. This group became a broad human rights group with the help of its first executive director, Hulbert James. The women in the organization battled throughout the scare tactics imposed by white residents in segregated parts of Louisville in the 1960s.

== Origins ==
In the 1800s the West End, an area of Louisville west of 7th Street and north of Algonquin Parkway, was a prominent hub for African American activity primarily that of abolitionist blacks (and whites). What was significant about West End was that after the Civil War, it was one of the few places in which Louisville's African Americans could have a political voice. In fact, each year, one black would sit on the local community council each year to assist with community related deliberations and decision making. Some trace the group's activist work back to the 1930s and the Lincolnia Council which was a group that worked to secure better library and recreational equipment for its neighborhood. The first documented source of the West End Community Council was in 1946 when the Cincinnati Times-Star reported advocacy by the local African Americans as part of the Negro Community Council. The actual name "West End Community Council" does not appear in the Times-Star until the 1950s.

The Council organization by the 1960s included a Board of Directors made up of the chairpersons of eleven standing committees and of representatives from each of the seven districts in the West End. The board was led by four elected officers (chairperson, vice-chairperson, secretary and treasurer) and an executive committee which held monthly meetings. Until 1965 the work of the Council was conducted by volunteers and funding from local donors and membership fees. A grant from the United Church of Christ and funding from the federal Head Start Program allowed the Council to begin holding neighborhood festivals to celebrate local talent.

== Violence of segregation ==
Demonstrations by the Ku Klux Klan showed the possibility of race-based violence in Louisville, and white families would move out of neighborhoods en masse once a black family moved into that neighborhood. This instilled a sense of fear and inferiority into minorities during this time, making the few blacks that could actually afford the houses feel unwelcome. Some blacks and sympathetic whites organized protests and marches, but oftentimes those would end in violence. In 1964 the West End Community Council conducted a survey to measure the degree of racial prejudice in their neighborhood.

== Peace efforts ==
The West End Community Council (WECC) organized political, social and cultural activities in this 1000-block area of Louisville to try to halt the movement of whites out of the West End. The WECC helped raise the visibility of issues involving the desegregation of housing and schools, the need for urban renewal and a cleaner environment. In 1966 the WECC hired its first full-time director, Hulbert James, and began the "Project West End". This initiative promoted voter registration efforts, improved zoning laws, better street maintenance, the formation of block clubs and programs for community youth. As a fiscal agent for the Louisville Community Action Commission for a short time, the WECC disbursed federal anti-poverty funds to local groups by hiring community organizers. WECC members organized other grassroots groups such as Community Action on Metropolitan Problems (improved police protection), the Public Housing Tenant Association, and the West Louisville Cooperative Ministry.

The women of the Louisville West End Community Council strived for open housing in a more peaceful fashion when they worked for equal garbage pickup in black neighborhoods, as well as the placement of traffic lights in those areas. These women also organized and hosted the local festivals to promote the intermingling of the races to encourage a more peaceful integration of housing. The organization continued by working towards the integration of local restaurants as well. In 1969 the Louisville Welfare Rights Organization, established by the WECC then under the leadership of Rev. Charles Tachau as the new executive director, organized a march of welfare mothers on Frankfort, Kentucky.

The efforts by this group helped foster more accepting attitudes about integration and promoted equal housing for anyone who could afford it, later influencing movements for affordable housing for low-income families, regardless of race. Examples of movements for affordable housing are the U.S. Department of Housing and Urban Development which is an organization that worked to end racial segregation and enforce fair housing.

== Fair housing ==
Fair housing was a tricky subject because in most cases, African Americans couldn't afford decent housing during this time. This stems from multiple factors: one being that lack of adequate education received due to inferior segregated schools with less than quality book conditions, among other shortcomings and the second being that most of the work that was available to African Americans with these sub-par education at this time were manual labor positions that didn't pay well. When paired with the tensions between whites and blacks, blacks barely stood a chance to purchase a decent home. With the West End Community Council's work towards open housing, the goal was to bridge the gap so that the African Americans who could afford certain homes could actually purchase them without the scare tactics of white segregationists. Later, they pushed for more affordable housing so more of the lower income Americans could purchase decent homes, regardless of race.

== Famous members ==
Certain members of the West End Community Council went on to receive further recognition in their work with civil rights. For example, Leo Lesser Jr., who was executive director of the West End Community Council was inducted into the Kentucky Commission on Human Rights Hall of Fame in 2010. He was known for his desire for a peaceful transition into integrated housing and his resilience in the face of violence and jeers. Another prominent member was Ruth Booker-Bryant who was the West End Community Council's VISTA coordinator in the mid-1960s. She also participated in many demonstrations fighting for fair housing for African Americans. She also was very active in the Black Women for Political Action group. Another famous Kentuckian who was an organizer of this movement was Anne Braden.

== Dissolution ==
When the last of its funding ran out and with a membership count of only 40, the West End Community Council officially disbanded on March 22, 1970.

== See also ==
- History of Louisville, Kentucky
- Housing Segregation
- List of Jim Crow law examples by State, in Kentucky
- Louisville, Kentucky
- Louisville riots of 1968
- NAACP in Kentucky
- National Register of Historic Places listings in Louisville's West End
- Open housing
- Racial segregation in the United States
- Residential segregation
