= City of Parks =

Municipal project

City of Parks is a municipal project to create a continuous paved pedestrian and biking trail around the city of Louisville, Kentucky while also adding a large amount of park land. The project was announced on February 22, 2005. Current plans call for making approximately 4,000 acres (1,600 ha) of the Floyds Fork floodplain in eastern Jefferson County into park space, expanding area in the Jefferson Memorial Forest, and adding riverfront land and wharfs along the Riverwalk Trail and Levee Trail. There are also plans to connect the 100-mile (160 km) Louisville trail to a planned seven miles (11 km) trail connecting the Southern Indiana cities of New Albany, Clarksville and Jeffersonville.

== Louisville Loop ==
The Louisville Loop is a planned 110-mile (180 km) bike and pedestrian trail which will circle the city of Louisville, Kentucky when completed, using the trail to connect many of the city's existing parks and future parks.

=== History ===
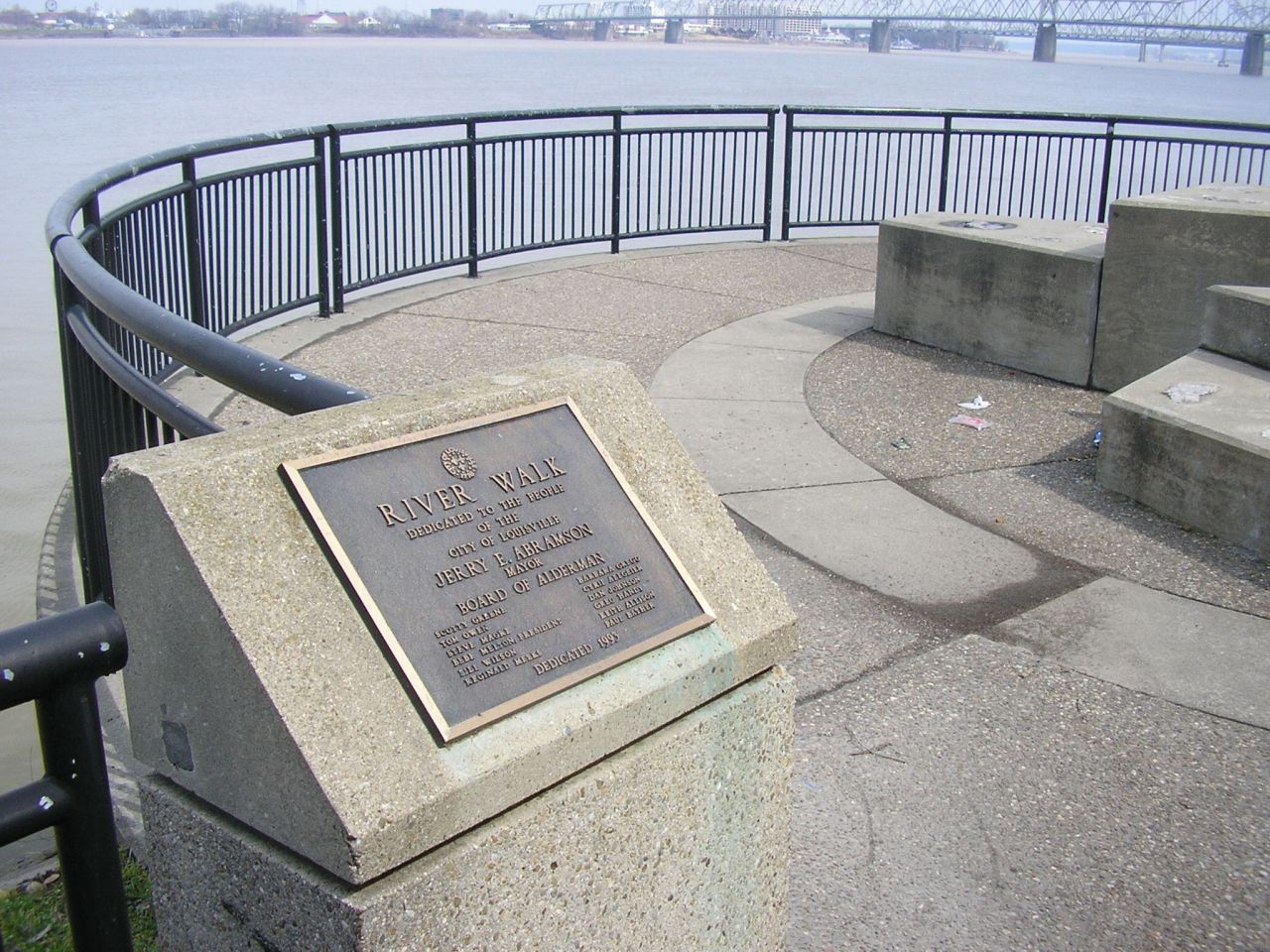
Dedication plaque for the trail, located near the Belvedere

The city's first bike path effort, Beargrass Bikeway, which connects Cherokee Park to the Belvedere, was opened in 1980 but received little use. The section connecting the Belvedere to Shawnee Park was first proposed in 1988.

==== Existing sections ====
The Louisville Loop currently extends a total of 30 miles from the Farnsley-Moremen House to Downtown.

The first completed section of the Louisville Loop was created in the 1980s and is known as the Riverwalk. It is a 6.9-mile (11.1 km) bike and jogging trail running along the city's Ohio River waterfront from the Belvedere to Chickasaw Park. It passes through Lannan Park in Portland and Shawnee Park along the way. A portion of the trail runs along city streets Portland, with about 0.4 miles (0.64 km) of the total route existing on city sidewalks. The trail passes through the former Portland Wharf area, which was razed for I-64 development, and the old street grid is still visible. Along the way, there are mileage markers on the surface of the trail every tenth of a mile, as well as markers giving information on 19th century river culture, such as units of measurement, river jobs, and types of riverboats.

The second oldest section of the Louisville Loop is the 3.6-mile (5.8 km) Levee Trail, which spanning the flood protection from runs from Riverside Park in Pleasure Ridge Park to the Farnsley-Moremen House to Lees Lane.

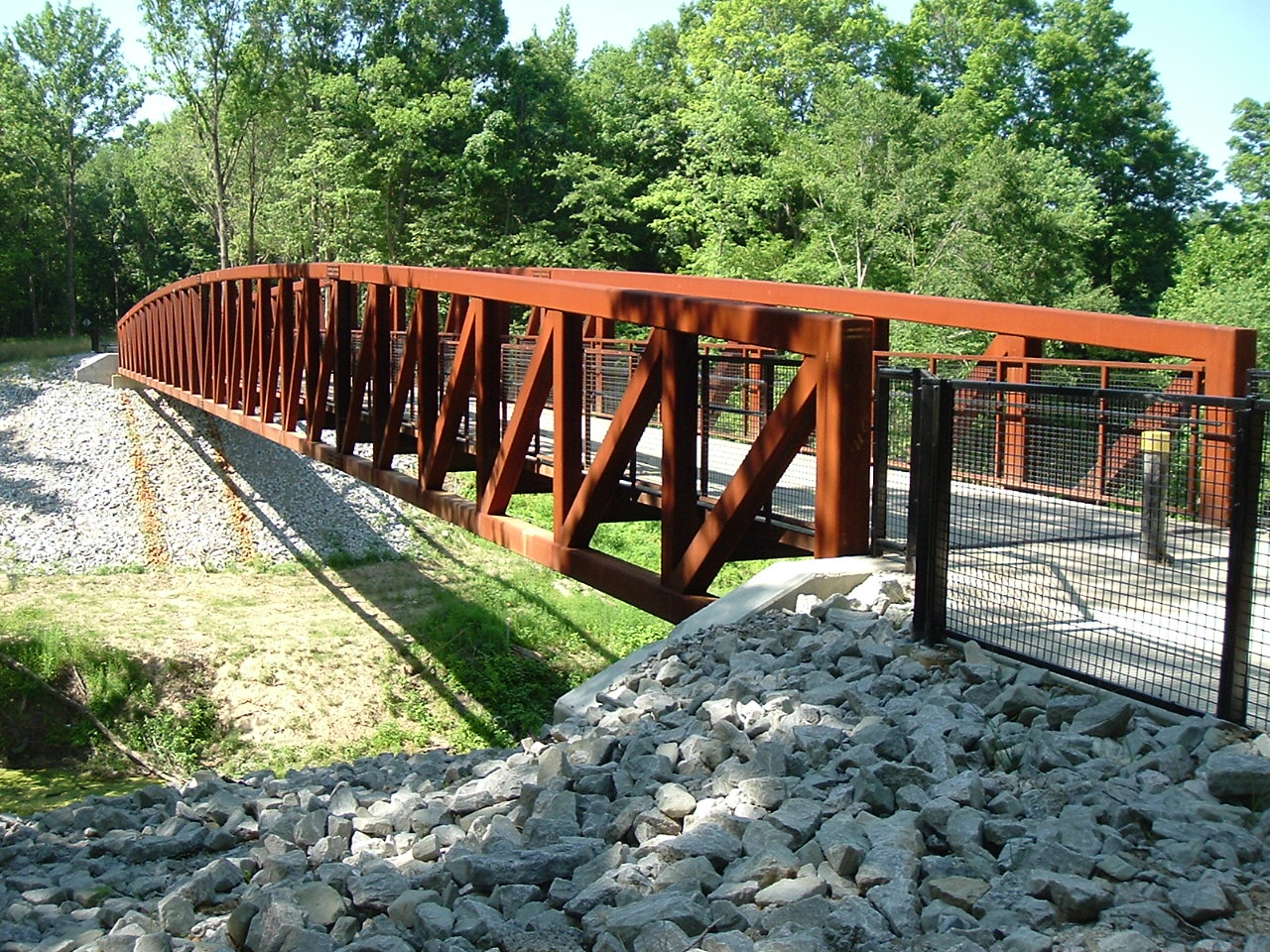
The newly completed bridge over Mill Creek near Shively

In 2007, the 10-mile (16 km) Mill Creek Trail was completed, connecting the Levee Trail and The Riverwalk, ending at Lee Lane in Riverside Gardens. A small stretch of the Mill Creek Trail had been completed in 2002 by LG&E, on whose property much of the trail is located, which ran from Greenwood Rd. to Mill Creek. An extension added by the city in 2007 included a $2 million bridge over Mill Creek.

=== Future sections ===
The total trail length for a completed Louisville Loop is estimated at 100 miles. The Louisville Loop has construction underway, as of 2023, for McCrawly Lake, connecting the Middletown section to the Beckley Creek Park section, and the rest of Algonquin Parkway. Jefferson Memorial Forest portions are being designed, as well as a route along all of the Parkways, a section on River Road near the Water Company, and a connector route from Broad Run Park to around Beulah Church Road.

== Gallery ==
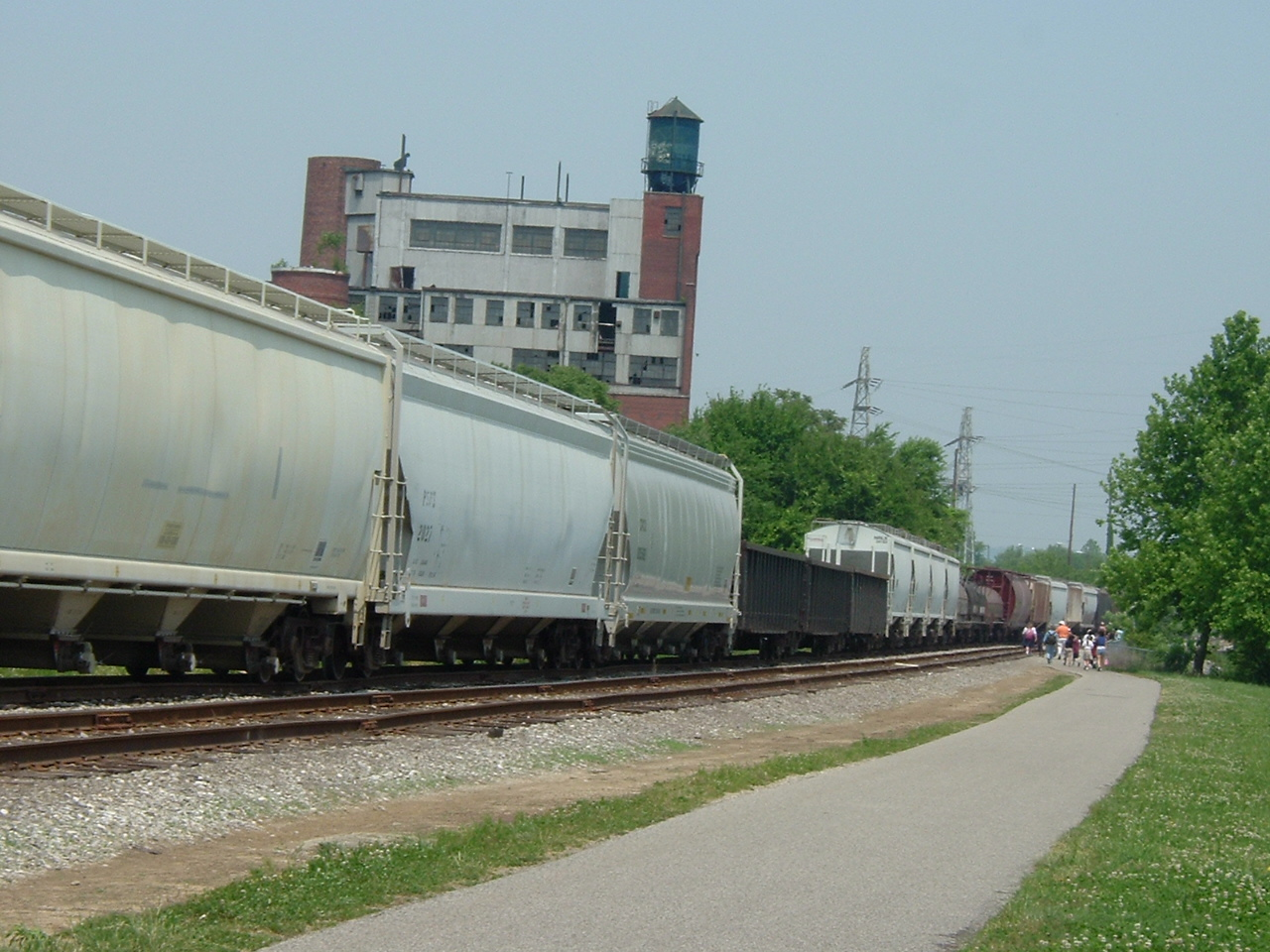
The RiverWalk near the vertical liftgate bridge

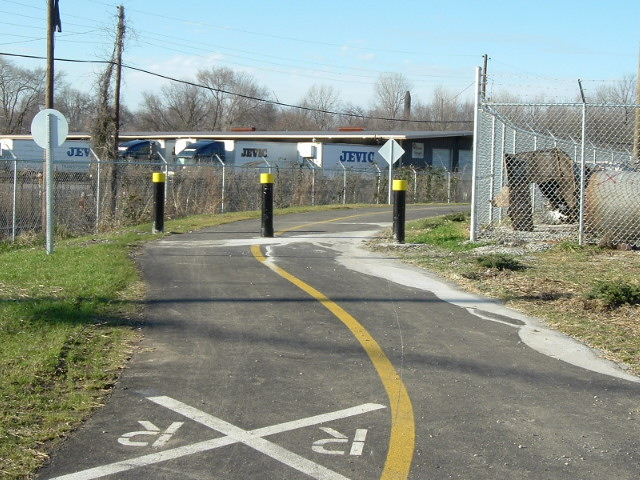
Rail crossing for the trail in Rubbertown

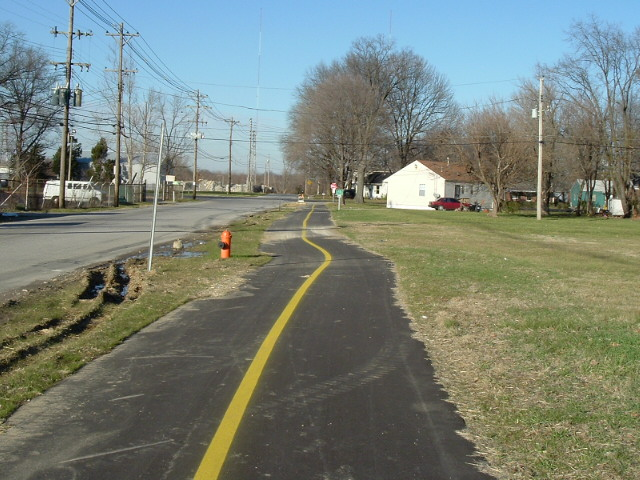
Section of the trail in West Louisville

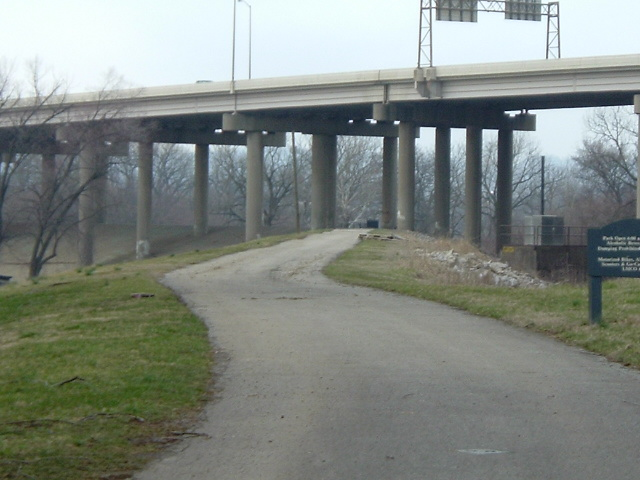
The RiverWalk going under the I-64 Causeway

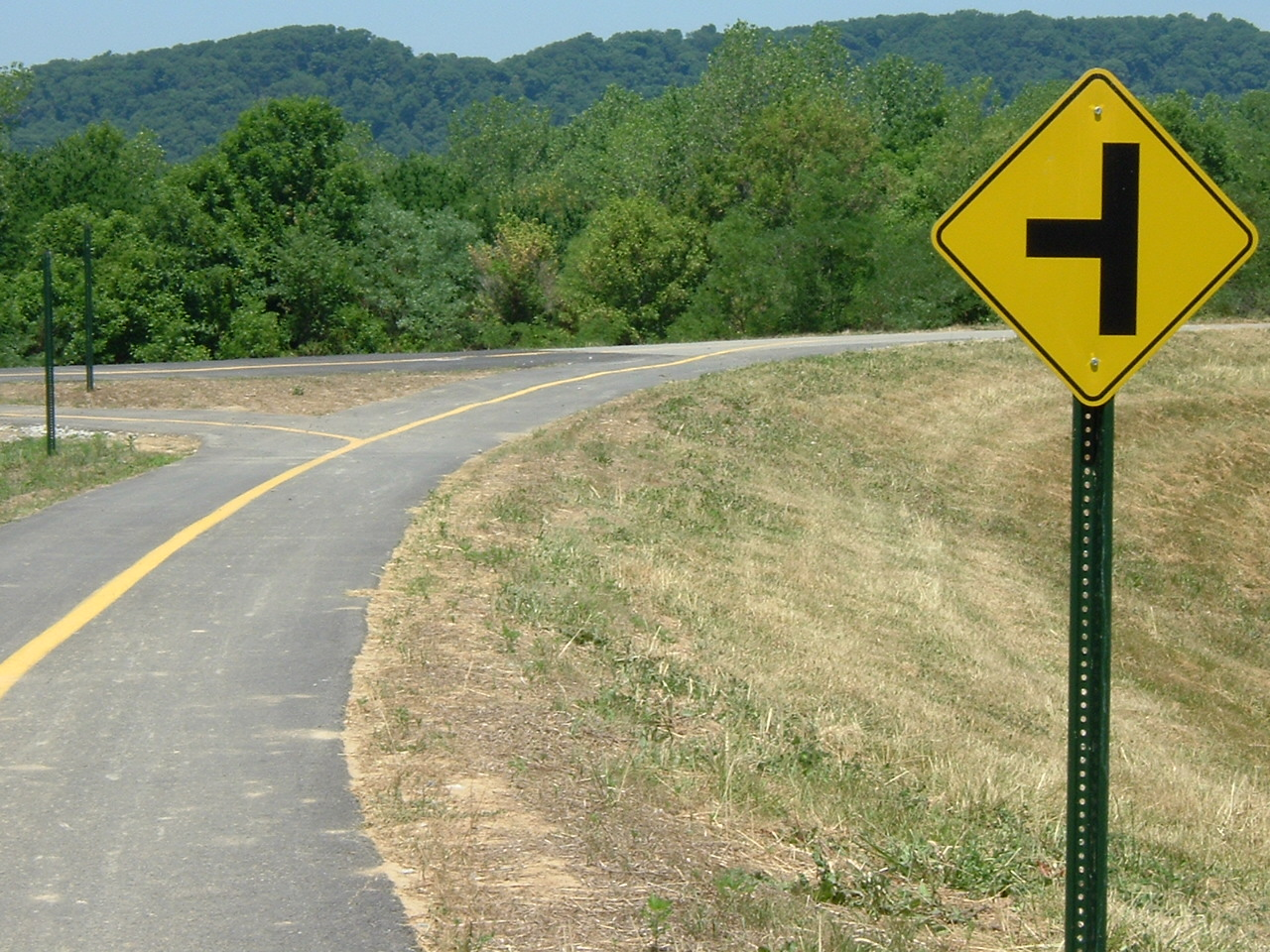
Junction of the trails leading to Mill Creek bridge and landing

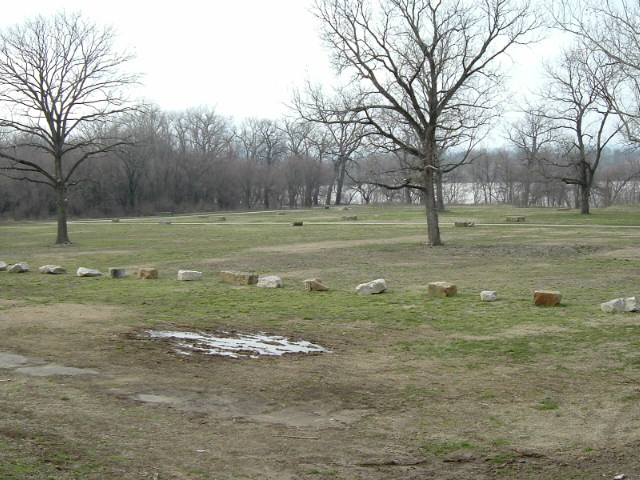
RiverWalk at the Old Portland Wharf

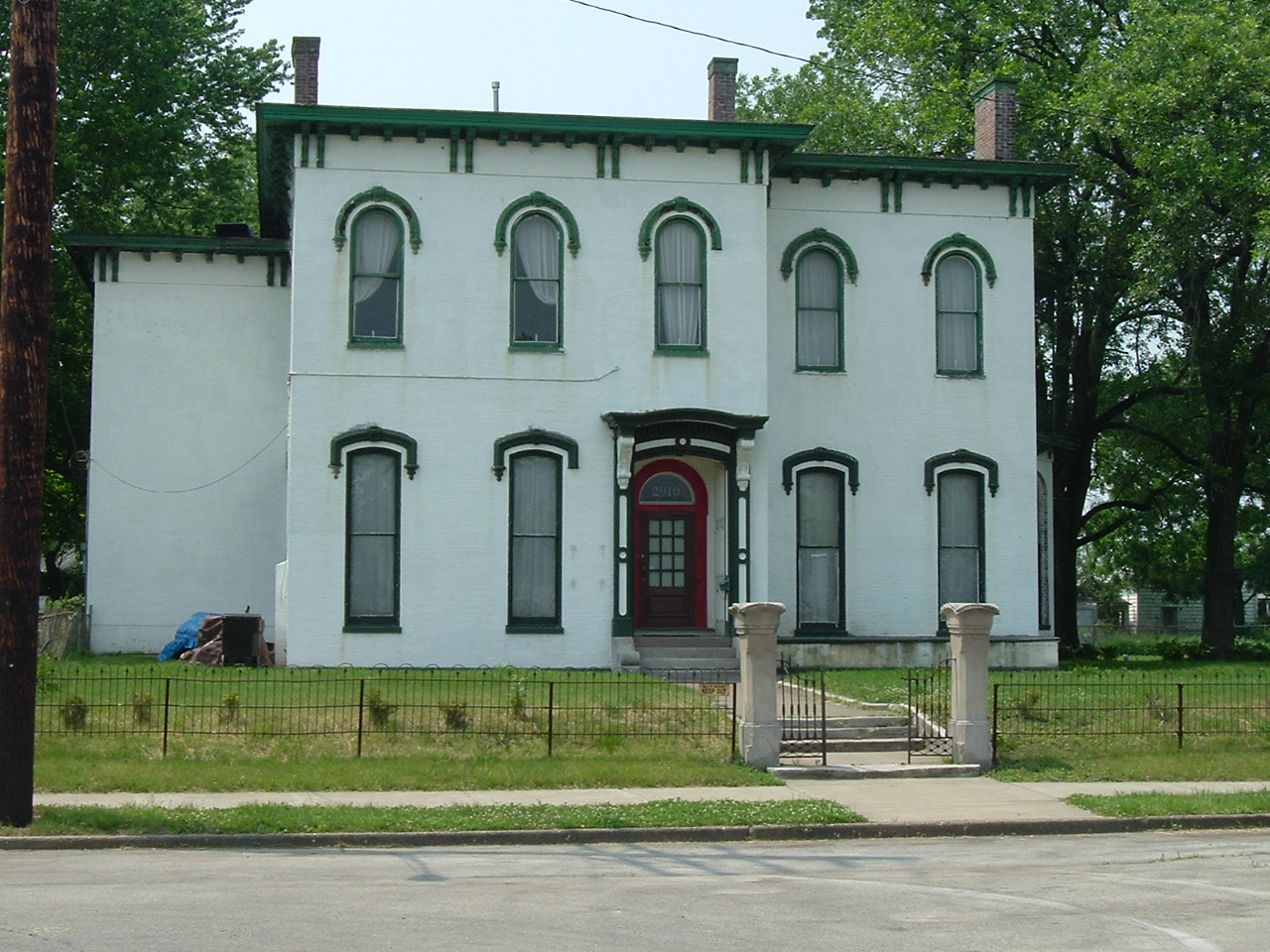
A Civil War era house off the RiverWalk

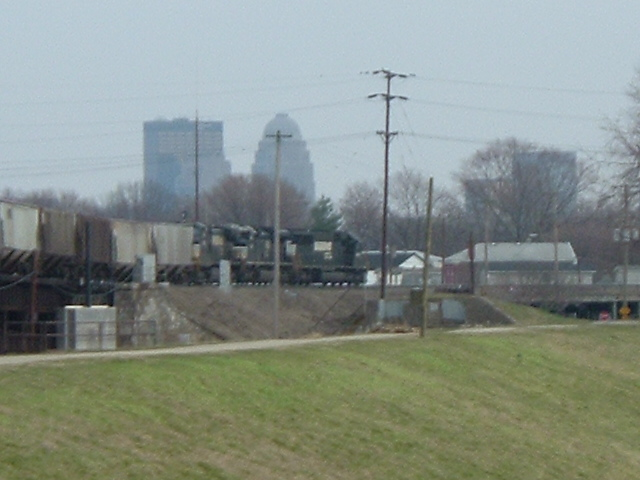
Louisville skyline viewed from the RiverWalk

== See also ==
- List of attractions and events in the Louisville metropolitan area
- List of parks in the Louisville metropolitan area
- Louisville Waterfront Park
- Emerald Necklace, a series of connected parks around Boston
