= List of killings by law enforcement officers in the United States, May 2022 =

This is a list of people reported killed by non-military law enforcement officers in the United States in May 2022, whether in the line of duty or not, and regardless of reason or method. The listing documents the occurrence of a death, making no implications regarding wrongdoing or justification on the part of the person killed or officer involved. Killings are arranged by date of the incident that caused death. Different death dates, if known, are noted in the description. The table below lists 59 people.

== May 2022 ==
Date	Name (age) of deceased	Race	City/state	Description
2022-05-31	Michael Angelo Gales (37)	Black	Locust, North Carolina	
2022-05-31	Andy Brock (46)	White	London, Kentucky	
2022-05-31	Victor Thomas Torres Jr (42)	Hispanic	Spring Hill, Florida	
2022-05-30	Yosef Bekermus (31)	Unknown race	Cape Coral, Florida	
2022-05-30	Michael Morado (19)	White	Billings, Montana	
2022-05-30	Mark Anthony Diaz (21)	Hispanic	Siler City, North Carolina	
2022-05-30	Matthew Todhunter (33)	White	Marysville, Ohio	
2022-05-30	Datwuan Catchings (22)	Black	Cleveland, Ohio	
2022-05-29	Masen T. Moore (22)	White	Sedalia, Missouri	
2022-05-29	Tony Brown (52)	Unknown race	Phoenix, Arizona	
2022-05-29	Jeffery Moctezuma Noyola (19)	Black	King, North Carolina	
2022-05-29	Stephen Paul John (51)	White	Safford, Arizona	
2022-05-29	Michael Wade McKee (50)	White	Tulsa, Oklahoma	
2022-05-28	Davin Darayle Saunders (38)	Black	Cheyenne, Wyoming	
2022-05-28	Davonnte McKnight (29)	Black	Tallahassee, Florida	
2022-05-28	Bradley Thompkins (51)	White	Rockford, Illinois	
2022-05-27	Dustin Vance (42)	White	Salina, Kansas	
2022-05-27	Miguel Angel Rodriguez (39)	Hispanic	Pomona, California	
2022-05-26	Robert Hammitt (48)	Unknown race	Austin, Texas	
2022-05-26	Douglas Weishaupl (53)	White	Mead, Colorado	
2022-05-26	Robert Earl Williams (24)	Unknown race	Lakehead, California	
2022-05-26	Houston Tipping (32)	White	Los Angeles, California	
2022-05-25	Abe Banks (53)	Unknown race	Winn Parish, Louisiana	
2022-05-25	Spencer Cassanova Heckathorne (60)	White	Myrtle Creek, Oregon	
2022-05-25	Gregorio Banuelos (39)	Hispanic	Wichita, Kansas	
2022-05-25	Toure Jones (23)	Unknown race	Canton, Georgia	
2022-05-24	Salvador Ramos (18)	Latino	Uvalde, Texas	After non-fatally shooting his grandmother, Ramos shot and killed 21 people at Robb Elementary School, including 19 students. Ramos was killed by a Border Patrol agent.
2022-05-21	Arthur Page II (58)	White	Aiken County, South Carolina	Police chased Page, who was riding a motorcycle. After losing control and crashing, Page fled and fell over. When he turned over, a deputy shot him, stating he mistook an object in Page's hand for a firearm.
2022-05-20	Omari Cryer (25)	Black	Louisville, Kentucky	U.S. Marshals shot and killed Cryer in the Chickasaw neighborhood while attempting to serve an arrest warrant for domestic violence, strangulation and assault.
2022-05-20	Da'Shontay King Sr. (37)	Black	Racine, Wisconsin	After refusing to pull over, King Sr. fled the vehicle and was pursued by the officer on foot. When King Sr. attempted to retrieve a handgun he dropped, the officer opened fire, fatally injuring him. The officer was not charged.
2022-05-19	Devon Lee Taylor (19)	White	Beverly, Ohio	
2022-05-19	Tavis Latimore Carithers (23)	Black	Mableton, Georgia	
2022-05-19	Samuel Frias (35)	Hispanic	Seabrook, Texas	
2022-05-19	Michael MacFhionghain (57)	Unknown	San Francisco, California	Police responded to reports of a fight and encountered two homeless men, MacFhionghain and Mendoza, with MacFhiongain on top of Mendoza holding a knife. After MacFhionghain began to move aggressively towards Mendoza police opened fire, killing both men.
2022-05-19	Rafael Mendoza (49)	Unknown	San Francisco, California	Police responded to reports of a fight and encountered two homeless men, MacFhionghain and Mendoza, with MacFhiongain on top of Mendoza holding a knife. After MacFhionghain began to move aggressively towards Mendoza police opened fire, killing both men.
2022-05-19	Austin Flores (29)	Hispanic	Fresno, California	Flores pointed a replica handgun at officers who were responding to a call of a man who violated a restraining order.
2022-05-19	Dave Walker (45)	White	LaPlace, Louisiana	
2022-05-19	Rickey Looney (40)	White	Mena, Arkansas	
2022-05-19	Maddie Hofmann (47)	Asian	Malvern, Pennsylvania	Police were called to Hofmann's home for a wellness check. Less than a minute after entering the home, police shot and killed Hofmann, who was a transgender woman and parent of two children.
2022-05-16	Justin Moore (31)	White	Palmyra, Indiana	After running out of gas, Moore pulled over on the side of the road, where a reserve officer and an off-duty firefighter stopped to help him. After being asked to put a knife in his car, Moore grabbed a shotgun and shot at the officer and firefighter, killing the firefighter. The reserve officer then shot and killed Moore.
2022-05-13	Michael Foley (33)	Unknown	New Boston, New Hampshire	Foley was shot and killed by a police officer and a security guard near the New Boston Space Force Station.
2022-05-13	Unknown	Unknown	Memphis, Tennessee	A police vehicle hit a pedestrian crossing an interstate.
2022-05-08	Edward Wilkins (20)	Unknown	Wallkill, New York	An officer from the New York City Police Department shot and killed Wilkins in the parking lot of a Buffalo Wild Wings before shooting himself.
2022-05-08	Stephanie Dantzler (53)	Black	Ravenel, South Carolina	An officer sped past a stop sign, hitting a car carrying a mother and her two daughters. The officer was charged in their deaths.
2022-05-08	Shanice Dantzler-Williams (28)	Black	Ravenel, South Carolina	An officer sped past a stop sign, hitting a car carrying a mother and her two daughters. The officer was charged in their deaths.
2022-05-08	Miranda Dantzler-Williams (22)	Black	Ravenel, South Carolina	An officer sped past a stop sign, hitting a car carrying a mother and her two daughters. The officer was charged in their deaths.
2022-05-05	Larry Chadwick (68)	Unknown	Albertville, Alabama	Police responded to a domestic dispute and shot Chadwick. Police say Chadwick was holding a gun and refused to drop it, although he did not fire it.
2022-05-05	Prince Gurley	Black	Marion, South Carolina	Police responded to reports of a disturbance and shot Gurley. Body camera footage shows Gurley lunge at an officer with a knife before he was shot.
2022-05-04	Cicero Sanchez (31)	Hispanic	Federal Way, WA	Deputies were looking for a person wanted for felony assault. Deputies located Sanchez and attempted to arrest him. Sanchez fled the scene in an SUV after he intentionally struck several patrol cars. Police eventually stopped the vehicle and attempted to arrest Sanchez again, but encountered a lethal threat and fired their weapons. Sanchez died at the scene after lifesaving measures were performed, according to investigators.
2022-05-03	Mekiah D. Harris (26)	Black	Platte City, Missouri	
2022-05-03	Kenneth Lee Sykes (47)	White	Prichard, Alabama	
2022-05-03	Leron James (54)	Unknown race	Los Angeles, California	
2022-05-02	Samuel Ed Farnam Jr (44)	White	Ozark, Alabama	
2022-05-01	Lorenzo Molina (41)	Hispanic	Ducor, California	
2022-05-01	David Deaton (60)	Unknown race	Midland, Texas	
2022-05-01	Adam Shreve (39)	White	Waukegan, Illinois	
2022-05-01	George J. Gordon II (28)	White	Azle, Texas	
2022-05-01	William “Jerry” Crosby (55)	White	Jacksonboro, South Carolina	
2022-05-01	Scott Osborn (47)	White	Hooker, Oklahoma	

== See also ==
- Death in custody § United States
- Henry A. Wallace Police Crime Public Database
- List of cases of police brutality
- List of countries with annual rates and counts for killings by law enforcement officers
- List of law enforcement officers killed in the line of duty in the United States
- List of law enforcement officers convicted for an on-duty killing in the United States
- List of police reforms related to the George Floyd protests
- List of unarmed African Americans killed by law enforcement officers in the United States
- Lists of killings by law enforcement officers
- Police brutality in the United States
- Police misconduct § United States
- Police riot § United States
- Police use of deadly force in the United States
