= Ruth Booker-Bryant =

- Born: 1923; Detroit, Michigan, U.S.
- Died: 2013 (aged 89–90); Kentucky, U.S.
- Occupations: Social and human rights activist
- Known for: Activism in civil rights and fair housing in Louisville, Kentucky
- Awards: Carl and Anne Braden Lifetime Achievement Award (2011); Kentucky Civil Rights Hall of Fame (inducted 2003)

Ruth Booker-Bryant (1923-2013) was an American social and human rights activist. Booker-Bryant was born in Detroit, Michigan in 1923 and lived in Kentucky before dying in 2013. She was known for her activism and work in civil rights, fair housing, and the fight for better housing conditions in Louisville. Booker-Bryant received many awards in her life, including the Carl and Anne Braden lifetime achievement award in 2011 and was also inducted into the Kentucky Civil Rights Hall of Fame. Booker-Bryant was also a Buddhist member of the Soka Gakkai International. She was married to Louisville civil rights activist, Roscoe C. Bryant Jr. who fought and became the first African-American physician on the Louisville and Jefferson County Board of Health.

== Early life and education ==
Booker-Bryant was born to William and Fannie Booker of Detroit, Michigan in 1923. She was raised and spent her life in the west end of Louisville, Kentucky which is a predominantly black and low-income neighborhood in the city. This upbringing showed her how African-Americans during the depression and civil rights movement lived. This led to her urge to want a better tomorrow for her people and community.

== Career ==
Ruth Booker-Bryant fought hard for causes fighting for social and human rights. Throughout her career as a civil rights activist she was a part of multiple organizations and demonstrations fighting for better housing for Kentucky African Americans. Her first major role was being a VISTA coordinator for the West End Community Council from 1964-66. The West End Community Council was a human rights group active from the mid-1940s till the early 1970s that fought for equal housing in Louisville’s west end, The women on this council faced scare tactics from white residents in Louisville who opposed what the council was fighting for.

After this endeavor, she moved on to help found and become president of the Women United for Social Action. Also in 1968, she founded the Black Unity League in Kentucky to help empower African Americans to take action in the state of Kentucky. With the help of other civil rights leaders at the time Louisville eventually desegregated. Without catalysts like Ruth Booker-Bryant dedicating their whole lives to this cause, the fight might have taken longer or not happened.

== Recognition ==
With activism, recognition is not what Booker-Bryant was fighting for. She was fighting for equality and peace for African Americans and that started at home in Louisville, Kentucky. However her hard work and dedication to the fight for housing equality led for her to be inducted in to the Kentucky Civil Rights Hall of Fame in 2003. Her bio mentions how she dedicated her life to the fight for better housing and how she participated in a number of demonstrations throughout her career. She also received the Carl and Anne Braden Lifetime Achievement Award in 2011, for her lifetime of activism in the Louisville Civil Rights Movement.

== Personal life ==
Booker-Bryant was married to Roscoe Bryant, a physician. He the first African American physician on the Louisville & Jefferson County Board of Health.
