= Third Street Motor Car Company Building =

- U.S. National Register of Historic Places
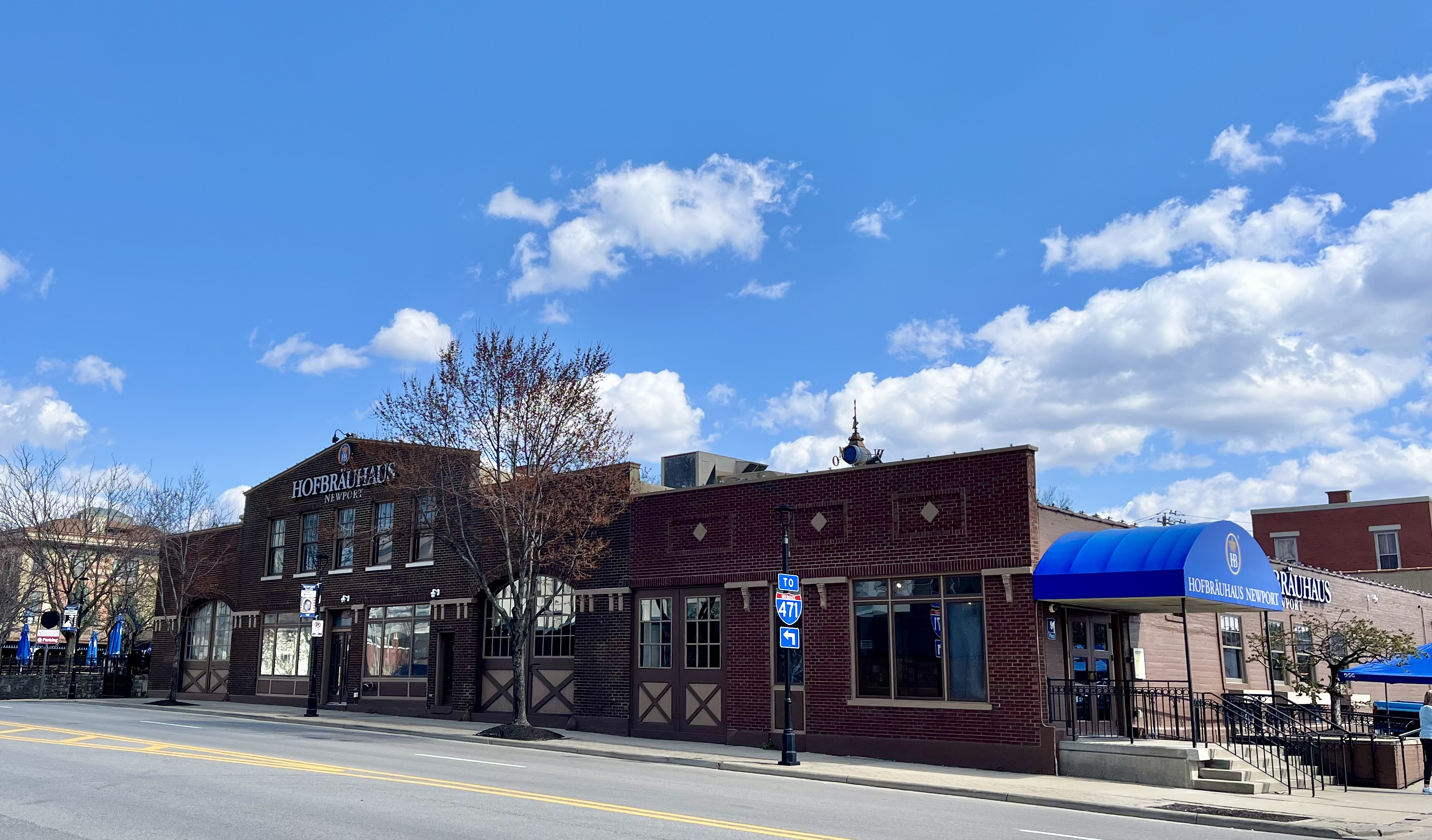
- Location: 216 E. Third St., Newport, Kentucky
- Coordinates: 39°05′43″N 84°29′39″W
- Area: less than one acre
- Built: 1916
- Architectural style: Bungalow/craftsman
- NRHP reference No.: 02001465
- Added to NRHP: December 5, 2002

The Third Street Motor Car Company Building, at 216 E. Third St. in Newport, Kentucky, was built in 1916. It was listed on the National Register of Historic Places in 2002.

It was deemed notable as "one of northern Kentucky's finest examples of this increasingly rare building type. It is characteristic in form and detailing, retaining many original features. Its tapestry brickwork and geometrical detailing, influenced by the Craftsman style, set it apart from other area examples. It has been evaluated within the context of "Automobile Showrooms of Northern Kentucky, c. 1910-1945."

== See also ==
- Universal Car Company: NRHP listing in Louisville, Kentucky
- National Register of Historic Places listings in Campbell County, Kentucky
