= Shawnee, Louisville =

Neighborhood of Louisville, Kentucky

Coordinates: 38.2629°N 85.8182°W

Shawnee is a neighborhood in western Louisville, Kentucky. Its boundaries are the Ohio River on the West, Bank Street and the Portland neighborhood on the North, I-264 on the East, and West Broadway on the South. Maps sometimes identify the area as Shawneeland.

== History ==
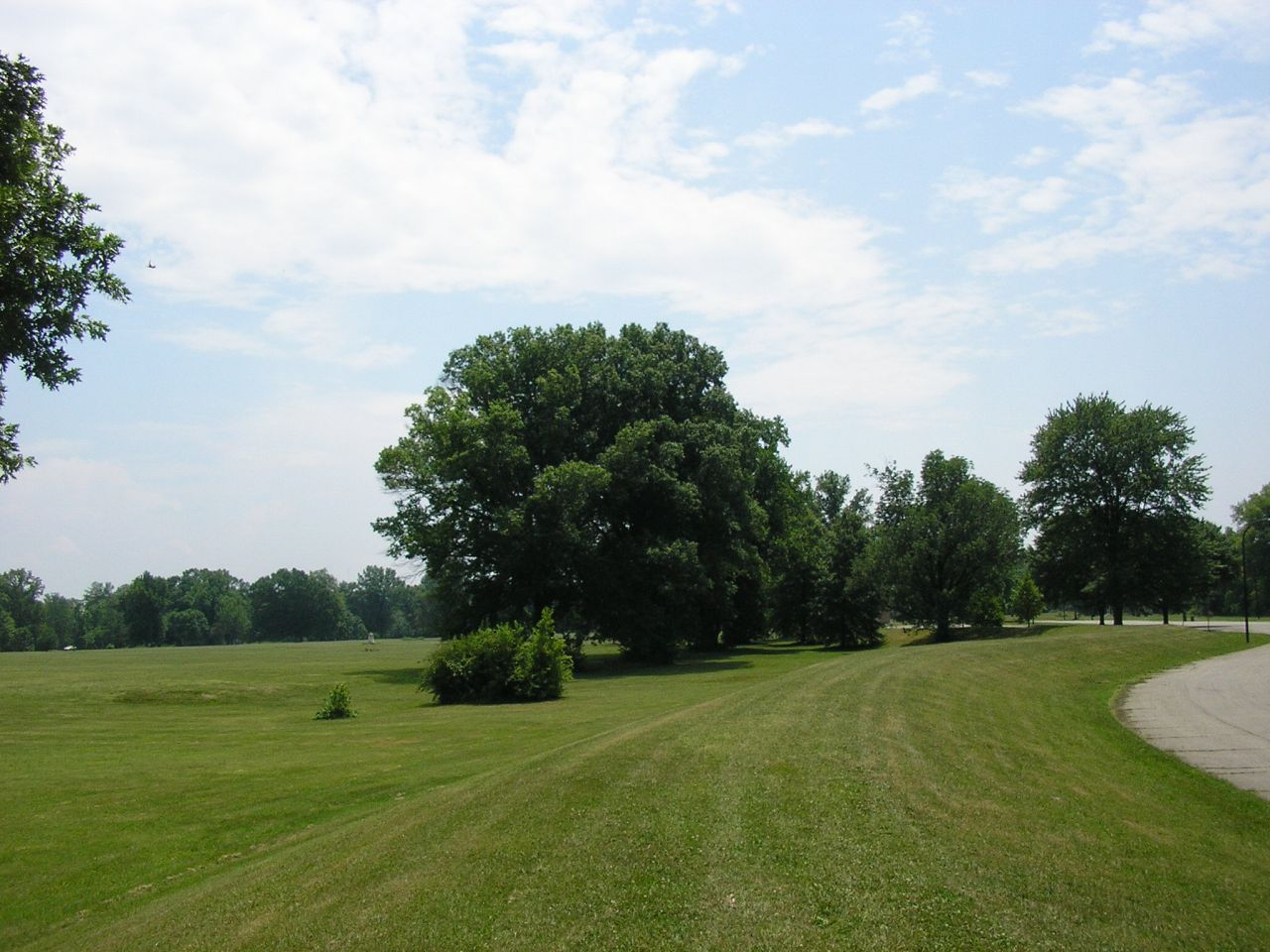
The Olmsted-designed Shawnee Park

Shawnee Park was completed in 1892 and residential districts sprung up around it quickly. In 1895, Louisville annexed Shawnee and extended street car lines. The land between Shawnee and Louisville was subdivided and many whites moved in during the early 20th century. The wealthiest areas were near the park and golf course, with middle- and working-class neighborhoods further east.

The Flood of 1937, as well as air pollution problems caused many white families to move further east. The neighborhood became integrated in the 1960s and was predominantly black following the 1968 riots when many longtime white residents moved. Many of the homes in Shawnee are examples of late-19th century architecture. The grand homes are still in good to excellent condition. The size and quality of these homes rival those found in other areas of the city, particularly Crescent Hill. As Louisville's West End is economically depressed and lacks many amenities, the housing costs are considerably lower than other areas of the city.

Like other Southern cities, many of Louisville's public facilities were segregated. The park system was no exception to this rule. Shawnee Park was a segregated whites-only public park, while Chickasaw Park, to the south, was a public park for blacks until the 1950s. Fontaine Ferry Park, an early amusement park located at the end of Market Street from 1905 to 1969, was restricted to whites, with the exception of "negro days" which was a common occurrence for opening segregated facilities limited to whites in the south. The park was integrated in 1963 and operated without incident until opening day 1969 when a race riot erupted which resulted in the amusement park being closed by its owners citing safety concerns. In 1973 it reopened as Ghost Town On The River and later as River Glen Park until it closed due to poor patronage in 1977. Following a series of fires which destroyed portions of the park in 1978 the park was demolished. Aubrey Dude Ranch remained until 1983 when it closed.

In September 2007, Shawnee residents voted to ban liquor sales in four precincts of the neighborhood in an effort to combat crime. Shawnee suffered from a rash of unsolved murders in 2005, although crime rates have since declined.

== Demographics ==
As of 2000, the population of Shawnee was 12,630. Though not recorded, the race breakdown is estimated to be around 90% Black or African-American, 5% White, and 5% Hispanic.

== Education ==
Shawnee has a lending library, a branch of the Louisville Free Public Library.
