= Doerhoefer–Hampton House =

Historic residence

- U.S. National Register of Historic Places
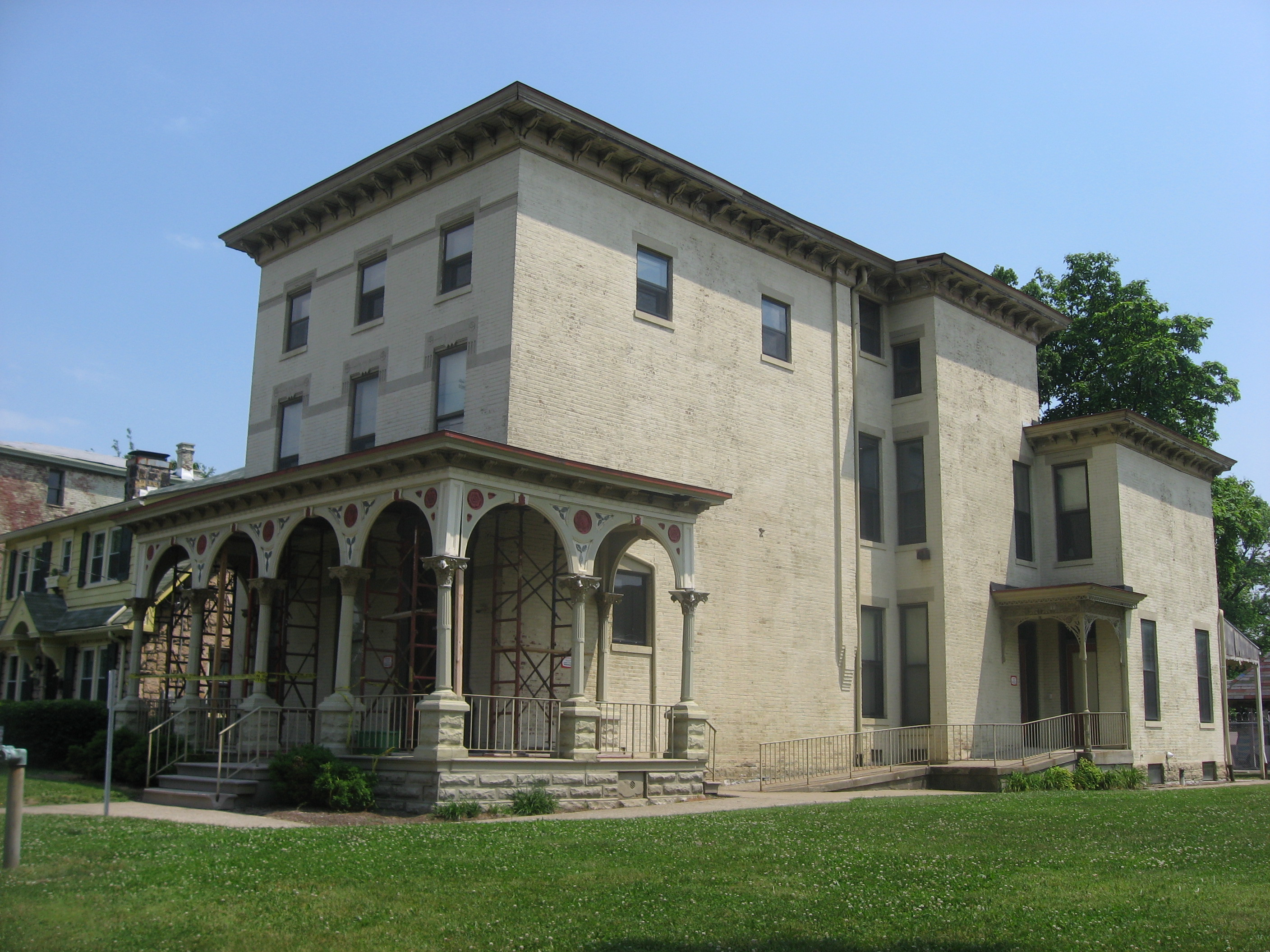

- Location within Kentucky
- Location: 2422 W. Chestnut St., Louisville, Kentucky
- Coordinates: 38.25250°N 85.79306°W
- Area: 0.3 acres (0.12 ha)
- Built: 1887
- Architectural style: Italianate
- NRHP reference No.: 79001002
- Added to NRHP: July 16, 1979

The Doerhoefer–Hampton House, at 2422 W. Chestnut St. in the Russell neighborhood of Louisville, Kentucky, has been deemed "the most architecturally prominent structure" in the neighborhood. It was built in Italianate style in 1887 and was listed on the National Register of Historic Places in 1979. In 2019, Louisville Metro Government approved the sale of the building to Theta Omega Inc., who planned to renovate the house and use it as its headquarters and meeting space for the local Omega Psi Phi fraternity chapter.

== See also ==
- National Register of Historic Places listings in Louisville's West End
