= Chickasaw, Louisville =

Neighborhood in Louisville, Kentucky

Coordinates: 38°14′42.03″N 85°49′13.67″W

Chickasaw is a neighborhood in Louisville, Kentucky, USA. Its boundaries are West Broadway, 34th Street, Hale Avenue and Chickasaw Park.

Chickasaw Park is predominantly black and middle-class. Before integration, Shawnee Park was reserved for whites, while Chickasaw Park was reserved for blacks. Integration has led to a decrease in use for Chickasaw as more persons prefer the larger Shawnee to the north. In 1969, Elmer Lucille Allen, a scientist and artist from the Chickasaw Little League created the Chickasaw Little League. The little league was in operation for 3–4 years and was made to accommodate the children who lived in the Chickasaw neighborhood who could not participate in the little league held in Shawnee Park.
