= Elmer Lucille Allen =

Ceramic artist and chemist

- Born: Elmer Lucille Hammonds; August 23, 1931 (age 95); Louisville, Kentucky
- Education: Louisville Municipal College; Nazareth College
- Occupations: Chemist (mostly at Brown-Forman)
- Known for: Ceramic art, distillery chemistry
- Awards: Governor's Award in the Arts (Kentucky)

Elmer Lucille Allen (born August 23, 1931) is an American ceramic artist and chemist. In 1966, she became the first African-American chemist at Brown-Forman in Louisville, Kentucky, and worked there for 31 years. In 2004, she became the first recipient of the Kentucky Arts Council Governor's Award in the Arts for Community Arts.

== Early life and career ==
Allen was born Elmer Lucille Hammonds on August 23, 1931, to mother Ophelia Guinn Hammonds and father Elmer Hammonds, in Louisville, Kentucky. Both her father and brother (nicknamed "Bud") were named Elmer and the family chose to name her Elmer Lucille (though at home her family also called her "Cile"). She and her family lived in the Russell neighborhood, and she attended Western Elementary. At the time, the city was segregated. In an interview she stated that she "never went to school with whites" until she was a junior in college.

Allen took her first art class, a sewing class, in seventh grade at Madison Street Junior High School. She stated in an interview that the first artist she identified with was her teacher, Ms. Hattie Figg, who taught painting at the junior high. She learned many functional crafts in junior high, such as shoe repair, printing, sewing, and carpentry. She also learned various crafts at the Plymouth Settlement House and Presbyterian Community Center. She was also a Girl Scout, and this activity fostered her interest in art.

Allen graduated from Central High School in 1949, at a time when African-American women had very few opportunities available to them. She attended Louisville Municipal College, a co-ed, all-Black school (part of the University of Louisville) from 1949 to 1951 and then switched to Nazareth College (now Spalding University) where she was one of only a few Black students. She worked as a babysitter and a house cleaner to help pay for college. She graduated with a Bachelor of Science degree from Nazareth College in 1953.

After graduating from college, Allen had a difficult time finding a chemistry-related job. She moved to Indiana, took the civil service exam and began working as a typist at Fort Benjamin Harrison. After her time at Fort Benjamin Harrison she worked as a hospital technician at General Hospital, then Methodist Hospital, then Community Hospital in Indianapolis. Allen moved back to Louisville in 1958 and continued to work as a hospital technician, setting up labs at Children's Hospital.

== Chemistry career ==
Allen's first chemistry-related job was at American Synthetic and Rubber Company (ASRC), which shut down shortly after she started. She then moved on to work as a research chemist for Dr. Felix Bronner at the University of Louisville, doing medical and dental research.

Through her colleagues and connections she made at UofL, in April 1966, Allen landed a job at Brown-Forman, a distillery specializing in whiskeys. When she began working there she was only one of a few woman in a non-secretarial job as well as the first black working for the company. She worked for Brown-Forman for 31 years, rising through the ranks and researching the chemistry involved in the grain-based components of whiskey making (malt, corn, etc.). She retired in 1997.

Allen was honored by the Kentucky Black Bourbon Guild for her significant impact on the bourbon industry. They recognize her legacy as an inspiration to young black women within the field today. The organization is in the process of developing a commemorative bottle as well as a scholarship fund in her name.

== Art career ==
In the 1970s, Allen's doctor recommended she try ceramics as a way to help ease the arthritis in her hands. Through an art therapist at Seneca High School, she started her ceramic career, in the class she met ceramic graduates from University of Louisville and they suggested that she take classes at the university. Starting in 1981 she began to study art at the University of Louisville, receiving her Masters of Creative Arts with a focus in ceramics and fiber in 2002. Allen's textile work incorporates shibori dyeing techniques.

Speaking of her ceramics, Allen states, "I make the things that I want, and I have always liked teapots." She enjoys the fact that if she made something she did not like, she could simply start over again. Her platters are typically dark and molten, while her teapots are colorful and graphic. She states, "When I rented my first studio in 2005 at Mellwood [Art Center], I knew that I was truly an artist."

In the 1980s, Allen became involved in the Louisville arts scene. She helped form the Kentucky Coalition of African American Arts and was a founding member of the Arts Council of Louisville.

=== Exhibits ===
- 2010 – "Absence and Presence: The Art of Elmer Lucille Allen and Valerie White" at E&S Gallery, Louisville, Kentucky
- 2011 – Powering Creativity: Air, Fuel, Heat at the Carnegie Center for Art & History in New Albany, Indiana
- 2016 – Women's Artist Exhibition: The African Heritage Experience at the Kentucky Center for African American Heritage in Louisville
- 2020 – "African-American Women: Celebrating Diversity in Art" at KORE Gallery, Louisville
- 2023 – "Remembrance", an exhibition honoring Lida Gordon by Bette Levy, Elmer Lucille Allen, Denise Furnish, and Melinda Snyder at PYRO, Louisville

== Personal life ==
In 1969, Allen was very active in her community and created the Chickasaw Little League. The little league, in operation 3–4 years, was formed to provide a place for the Black children who lived in the Chickasaw neighborhood to play baseball. They were discriminated against and were not allowed to participate in the little league held in Shawnee Park.

While at Brown-Forman, she met her husband, Roy Allen, who worked in the company's food services.

== Honors and awards ==
In 2019, the Imagine 2020 Mural Festival commissioned artist Brandon Marshall to create a mural celebrating the life of Elmer Lucille Allen.

In August 2025, Allen received an honorary street name sign regarding her contributions to Louisville science and culture, which reads: "Elmer Lucille Allen Way". It is located on the corner of Winnrose Way and Fairland Place in Louisville.

She has also received the following awards:

- 2004 – Governor's Award in the Arts (Kentucky), Community Arts; first-ever recipient
- 2004 – Woman of Distinction
- 2007 – "Women of Spunk" from Actors Theatre
- 2011 – Caritas Medal from Spalding University; highest award given by Spalding to alumni
- 2015 – Kentucky Museum of Art and Craft's Art Advocacy Award
- 2015 – Community Spirit Award given by the University of Louisville College of Arts and Science and the Yearlings Club
- 2016 – Parkland Rising Up Project
- 2016 – Louisville Defender – Lifetime Community Service Recognition Award
- 2016 – Outstanding Community Leader by Metro Council
- 2019 – Louisville Free Public Library's Pillars of Louisville
