= Ameri-Go-Round =

Carousels at Marriott's Great America amusement parks

Coordinates: 47°40′12.91″N 122°21′7.57″W

Character Carousel

California's Great America
- Area: Planet Snoopy
- Status: Removed
- Opening date: 1976
- Closing date: 1995
- Replaced by: Drop Zone

Six Flags Great America
- Area: County Fair
- Status: Removed
- Opening date: 1976
- Closing date: 2003
- Replaced by: Revolution

Ride statistics
- Attraction type: Carousel
- Manufacturers: Philadelphia Toboggan Company; Dentzel Carousel Company
- Model: Carousel
- Riders per vehicle: 1

The Ameri-Go-Round was the name given to two carousels, one at each of Marriott's Great America amusement parks, Six Flags Great America in Gurnee, Illinois and California's Great America in Santa Clara, California.

Marriott's Great America parks were unusual at the time because they were among the few parks with two carousels within the park. Each park had a carousel called the Columbia Carousel at the front of the park (which they both retain) in addition to the Ameri-Go-Rounds.

== Gurnee Ameri-Go-Round ==
Gurnee's Ameri-Go-Round was built by the Dentzel Carousel Company in 1922 for Fontaine Ferry Park in Louisville, Kentucky. It was sold to Great America when Fontaine Ferry closed in 1969, and operated at Great America until 2003.

It's a Deluxe Menagerie model 3-Row Carousel. It has 43 horses, with 12 elaborately carved outside row standing horses and 31 jumping horses. There are five menagerie figures, a lion, a tiger a deer, a giraffe, and a rare mule. Many of the jumpers were carved by Daniel Muller.

In 2003 the carousel was disassembled after the park closed for the winter. The ride was replaced with a HUSS Frisbee ride named Revolution in 2004. One reason for the ride's removal was that the ride was closed often due to low staffing and mechanical problems.

=== Current status ===
The Ameri-Go-Round is in storage at the park. The ride is in storage crates near the lift hill for Superman Ultimate Flight.

== Santa Clara Ameri-Go-Round ==
Santa Clara's Ameri-Go-Round was Philadelphia Toboggan Company's 45th carousel, built in 1918. It was built for the Cincinnati Zoo, sold by the zoo to Great America in 1974 and debuted there when the park opened in 1976. It was taken out of service in 1995 to make way for the Drop Zone Stunt Tower attraction. In 2000, it was announced that Linda and Tom Allen had arranged to donate it to Woodland Park Zoo in Seattle. After a pavilion was constructed for it, it debuted there in 2006.

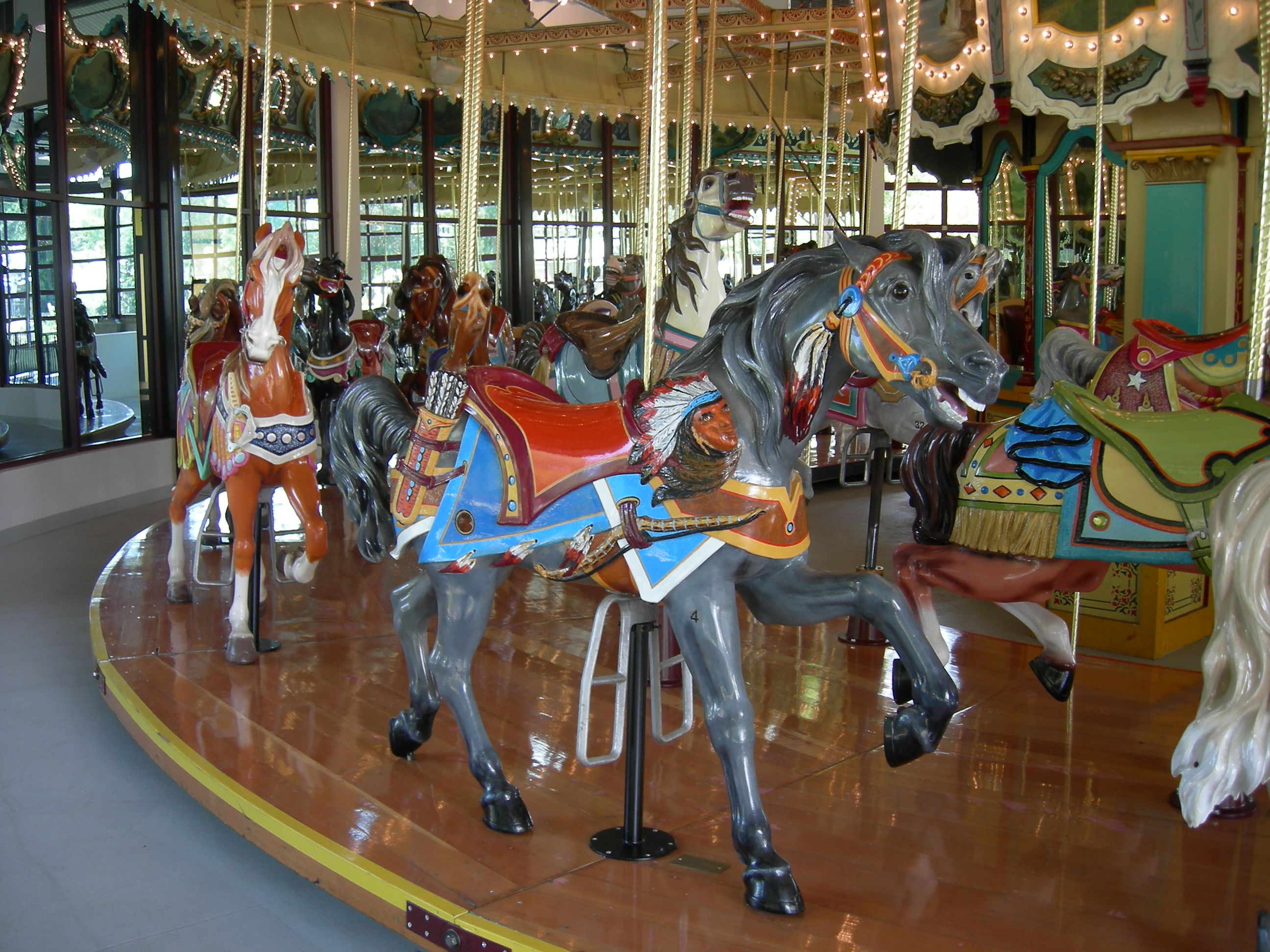
Carousel at the Woodland Park Zoo in Seattle.
