= Park Hill, Louisville =

Neighborhood in Louisville, Kentucky

Coordinates: 38°13′57″N 85°46′54″W

Park Hill is a historically Black neighborhood in Louisville, Kentucky, United States, located just west of Old Louisville. Its boundaries are the CSX railroad tracks to the east, Hill Street to the south, Twenty-sixth street to the west, and Virginia Avenue and Oak Street to the north. In the 19th century, the southwestern farmland portion of the neighborhood was known as the Cabbage Patch, the citizens of which inspired Alice Hegan Rice's 1901 children's novel Mrs. Wiggs of the Cabbage Patch.
