= Parkland Evangelical Church =

Historic church in Kentucky, United States

- U.S. National Register of Historic Places
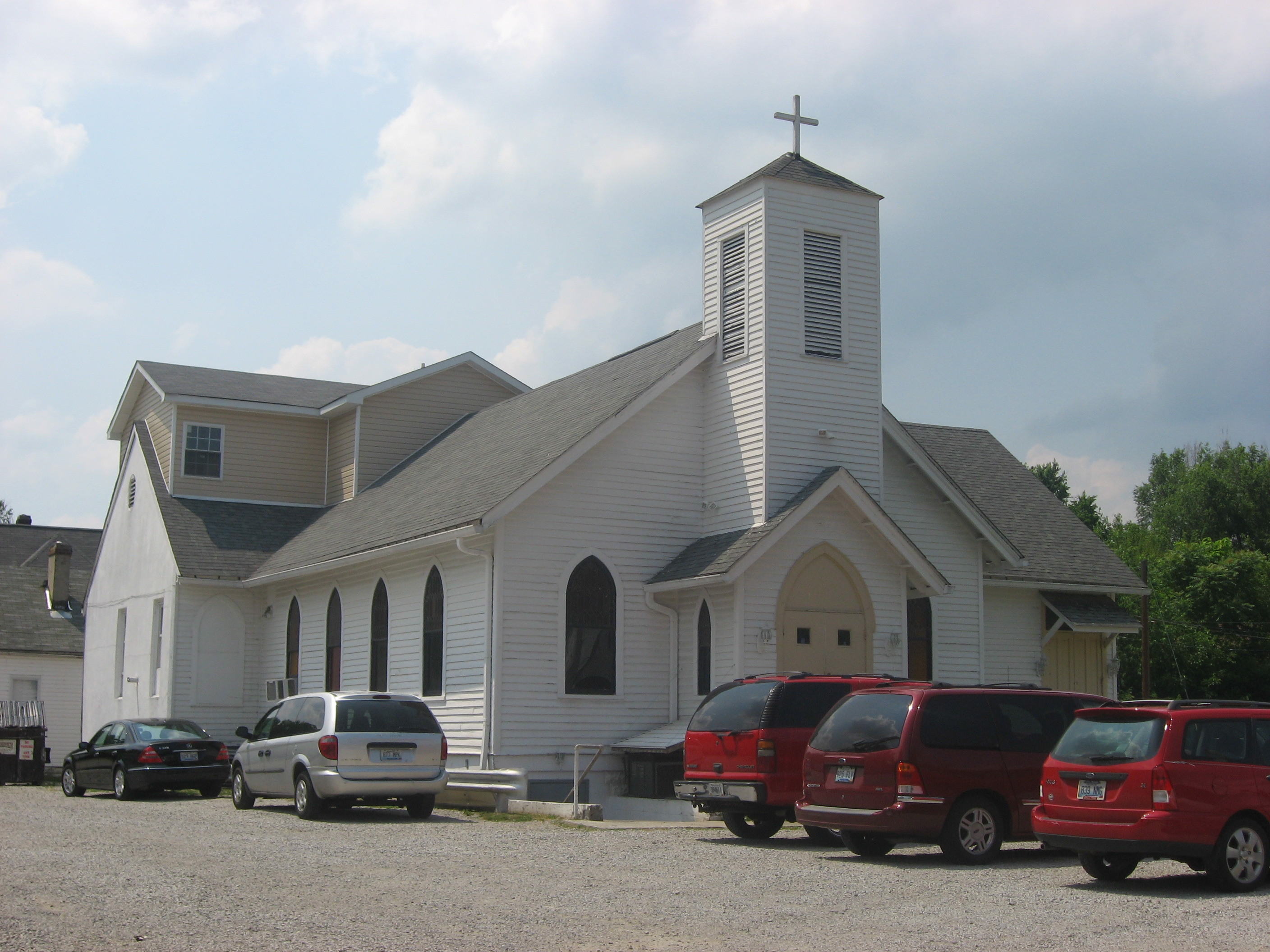
- Front and southern side

- Location within Kentucky Location within the United States
- Location: 1102 S. 26th St., Louisville, Kentucky
- Coordinates: 38°14′25″N 85°47′47″W
- Area: less than one acre
- Built: 1915
- Architectural style: Stick/Eastlake
- MPS: West Louisville MRA
- NRHP reference No.: 83002717
- Added to NRHP: September 8, 1983

Parkland Evangelical Church, also known as Greater Good Hope Baptist Church, is a historic church at 1102 S. 26th Street in Louisville, Kentucky. It was built in 1915 and added to the National Register in 1983.

According to its Kentucky Historic Resources Inventory evaluation, "The church is an excellent example of a Shingle style treatment with Gothic Revival motifs."
