= Theodore Roosevelt Elementary School =

- U.S. National Register of Historic Places
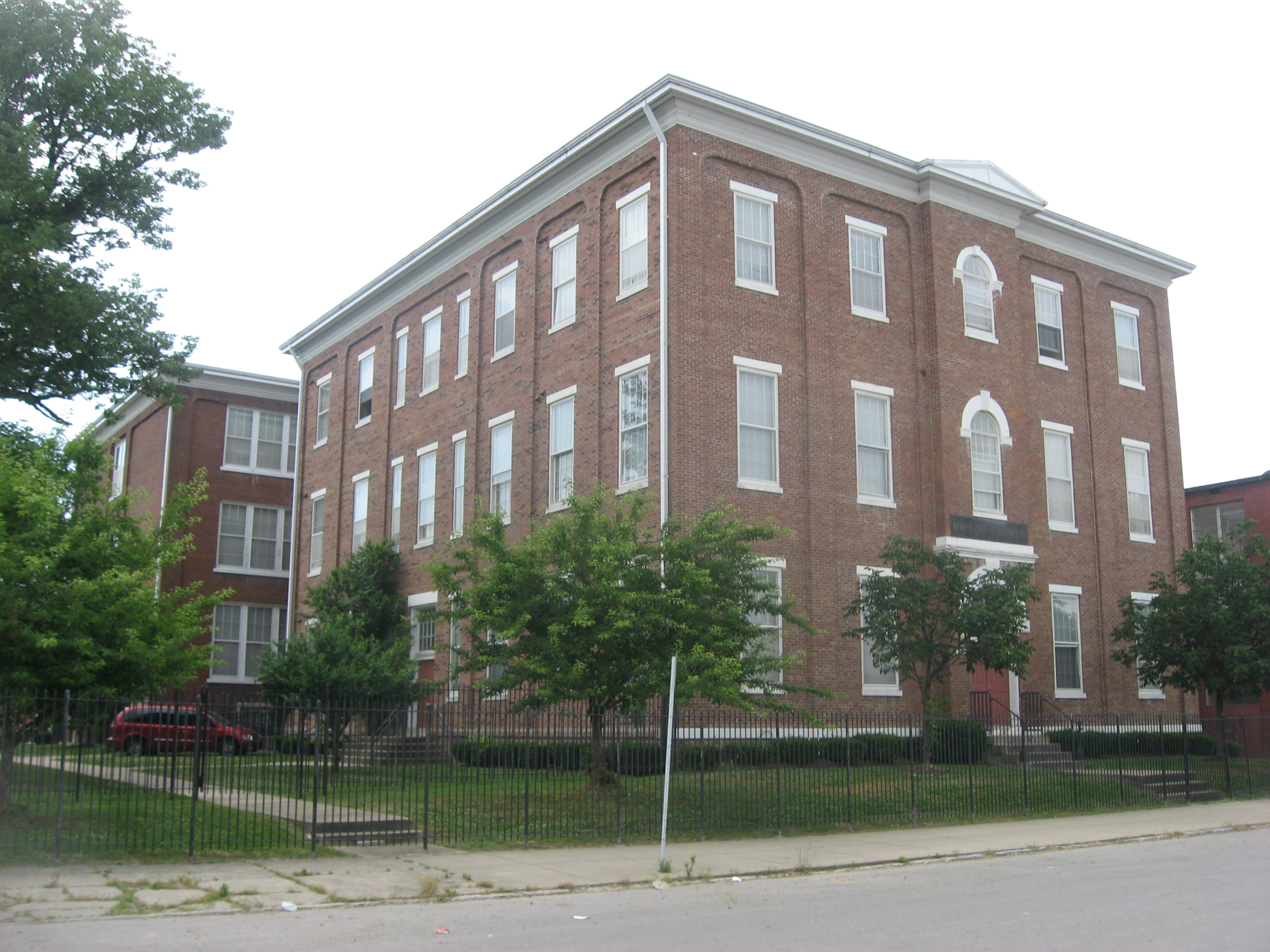
- Front and southern side

- Location within Kentucky Location within the United States
- Location: 222 N. 17th St., Louisville, Kentucky
- Coordinates: 38°15′41″N 85°46′41″W
- Area: 0.8 acres (0.32 ha)
- Built: 1865
- Architect: Bradshaw & Brothers
- Architectural style: Renaissance Revival
- NRHP reference No.: 82002719
- Added to NRHP: March 22, 1982

Theodore Roosevelt Elementary School was an elementary school in Louisville, Kentucky's Portland neighborhood. It was built in 1865. It was initially known as Eleventh Ward School, and became Duncan Elementary School in 1870, then Roosevelt Elementary School in 1920, in honor of former United States President Theodore Roosevelt.
