= St. George's Roman Catholic Church (Louisville) =

Historic church in Kentucky, United States

- St. George's Roman Catholic Church and Rectory
- U.S. National Register of Historic Places

- Location within Kentucky Location within the United States
- Location: 1809 Standard Avenue, Louisville, Kentucky
- Coordinates: 38°13′55″N 85°47′27″W
- Area: .89 acres (0.36 ha) (original); 2 acres (0.81 ha) (increased)
- Built: 1909
- Architect: Frederick Erhart
- Architectural style: Renaissance, Bungalow/Craftsman; Neo-Baroque
- NRHP reference No.: 82001563 and 96000293
- Added to NRHP: October 29, 1982 (original); March 27, 1996 (increase)

St George's Roman Catholic Church is located in Louisville, Kentucky and is a Neo-Baroque church constructed in 1915. It was listed on the National Register of Historic Places (NRHP) in 1982, and the listing was increased in 1996.

== Founding ==
The first iteration of the parish was chartered in 1897, and a church, rectory and school was constructed along 18th Street in Marysville, later incorporated into Louisville. Due to a rapidly increasing population in the working-class neighborhood, Louisville architect Frederick Erhart was hired to design a Romanesque Revival church that was dedicated in 1910.

The old church was reused for an expansion of the school, which was later augmented with several additions.

== 1915 Relocation ==
In 1915, the original rectory was relocated from its original location facing 18th Street to Standard Avenue, and it was given a new foundation and brick veneer. In the place of the original, a larger two-story rectory was constructed, attached to the church by a central corridor.

Population in the region contained to swell, so construction was completed on a new, three-level catholic school in 1923 along Standard Avenue. The school was expanded with a two-story addition in 1935, which included the completion of a smokestack and boiler, and two small, attached sheds.

== 1925 Relocation ==
Two years later, the Dixie Highway, later known as U.S. Route 31W, was established along 18th Street. The new designation brought forth additional traffic, and the roadway was widened to four-lanes. In addition, the Louisville & Nashville Railroad eliminated multiple at-grade crossings and replaced them with underpasses. As a result, the church property was affected and the building was relocated to face Standard Avenue in October.

Continued growth in the neighborhood necessitated another expansion for the church, however, World War II delayed any construction until the war was resolved. In 1947, the expansion, a gymnasium and classroom complex, was completed in two stages that was finished in the following year. The final construction project was the completion of a two-story convent in 1959.

The church was moved at some point. The NRHP listing was increased in 1996 to include a rectory and additional buildings.

== See also ==
- Saint George: Devotions, traditions and prayers
