= St. Anthony's Catholic Church (Louisville, Kentucky) =

Historic church in Kentucky, United States

- St. Anthony's Roman Catholic Church, Rectory, Convent, and School
- U.S. National Register of Historic Places
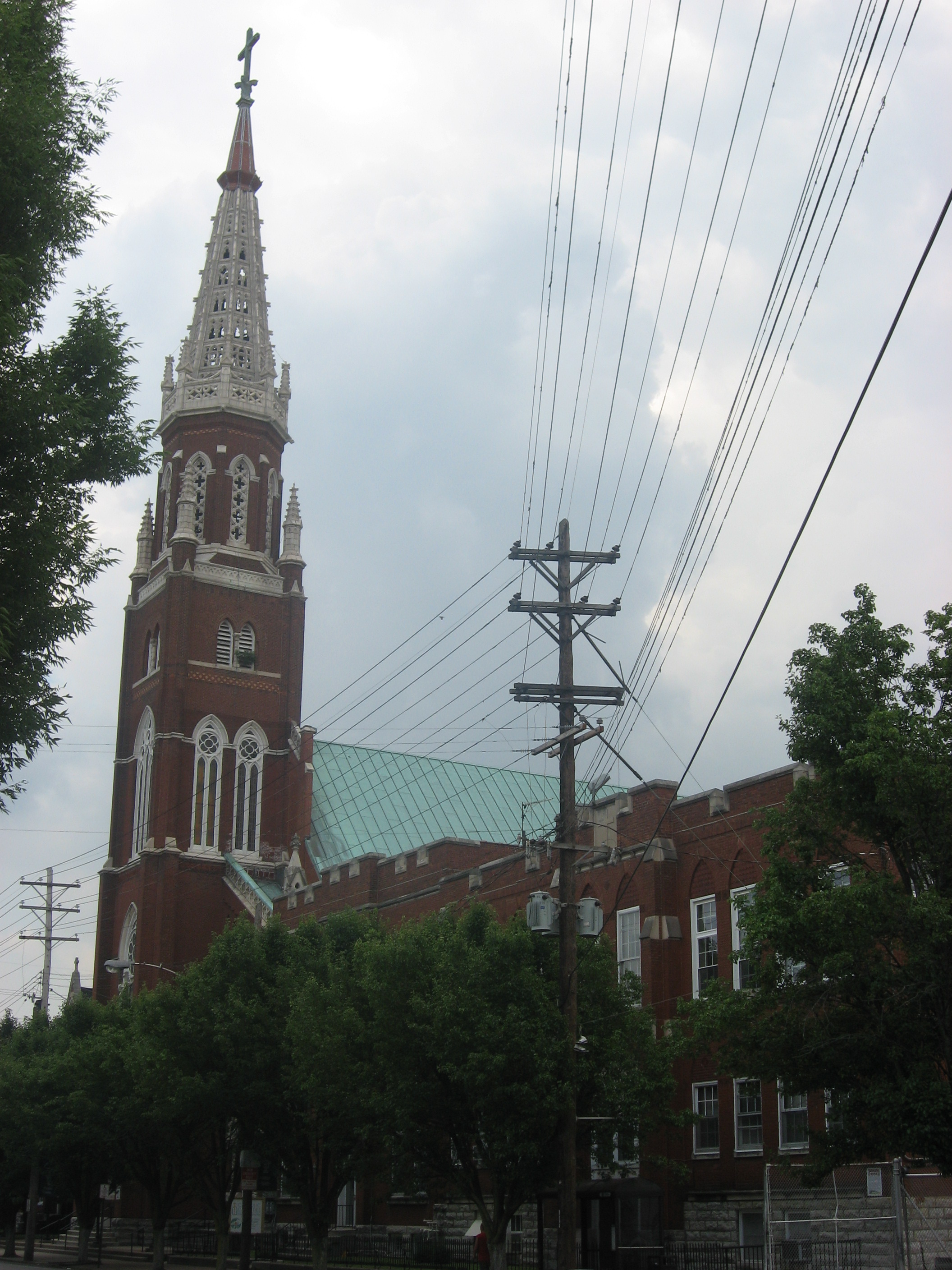
- Front and western side

- Location within Kentucky Location within the United States
- Location: 2222-2238 W. Market St., Louisville, Kentucky
- Coordinates: 38°15′30″N 85°47′18″W
- Area: 1.6 acres (0.65 ha)
- Built: 1887
- Built by: Skilton and Sullivan Construction Co.
- Architect: H. Redin, Walter C. Wagner, Sr.
- Architectural style: Gothic Revival
- NRHP reference No.: 82002720
- Added to NRHP: March 1, 1982

The former St. Anthony's Catholic Church is a redbrick historic Roman Catholic steepled church complex located at 2222-2238 West Market Street in Louisville, Kentucky. Designed by noted local architect William H. Redin in the Gothic Revival style of architecture, it was built in 1887. After a disastrous fire on January 26, 1939, which caused extensive damage to all buildings in the complex except the rectory to the left of the church, architect Walter C. Wagner Sr. designed the reconstruction of the complex which was done by Skilton and Sullivan Construction Company.

In 1978, the parish school was merged with St. Cecilia School and Our Lady of the Port Academy to form Community Catholic School on the St. Cecilia campus. On March 1, 1982, the complex was added to the National Register of Historic Places. In 2011, the Archdiocese of Louisville closed the church, merging its boundaries into those of the nearby Good Shepherd Parish. The centennial was celebrated on June 17, 1984.
