= Algonquin, Louisville =

Neighborhood in Louisville, Kentucky

Coordinates: 38°13′40″N 85°46′42″W

Algonquin is a neighborhood in Louisville, Kentucky, United States. Its boundaries are Hill street to the north, Cypress Street to the west, CSX tracks to the east, and Bernheim Lane and Algonquin Parkway to the south. It was established in the 1920s and is primarily a residential neighborhood, named for nearby Algonquin Park. Samuel D. Jones Park is located on Thirteenth and Bashear streets.
