= Parkland, Louisville =

Neighborhood of Louisville, Kentucky

Coordinates: 38.24230°N 85.81580°W

Parkland is a neighborhood in Louisville, Kentucky, USA. Its boundaries are 34th Street on the west, West Broadway on the north, Woodland Avenue on the south, and 26th Street on the east.

== History ==
Parkland was originally called Homestead and was incorporated in 1874. In 1884 the name was changed to Parkland. The neighborhood was initially a wealthy suburb of Louisville. A tornado on March 27, 1890 devastated Parkland, and Parkland was annexed by Louisville in 1894.

A community of freed black migrants formed shortly after the Emancipation in the lower-lying area of the neighborhood, originally called Needmore, coming to be known as Little Africa. Leaders such as black poet Joseph S. Cotter Sr. supported efforts to improve the area, yet it continued to stand in contrast to the wealthier and more developed partition of Parkland's white inhabitants. Material deterioration led to Little Africa's 1948 demolition to make way for several urban renewal projects, including one named after Cotter. Many were unable to return, however, with one resident receiving less than $5,000 for her home.

On May 27, 1968, Parkland was the site of race riots. Two adolescents were slain, and Parkland was held by the National Guard for seven days. Most businesses and many residents left Parkland after the riots. The neighborhood has since been the subject of several urban renewal efforts.

As of 2000, the population of Parkland was 4,550.

In 2015, the former Boxing Commissioner of Pennsylvania, George Bochetto, along with a real estate investor, Jared Weiss, bought Muhammad Ali's childhood home located at 3302 Grand Avenue in the Parkland section of Louisville. The home has been restored to its original 1950s condition when Ali lived there. Ali returned to this home in Parkland after his win of Olympic gold in the 1960 Rome Olympics. In 2016, the home opened as a museum called the Muhammad Ali Childhood Home Museum. Both Bochetto and Weiss hope that the renovation will help promote further pride and growth in the Parkland section of Louisville.
