= Chickasaw Park =

Municipal park in Louisville, Kentucky

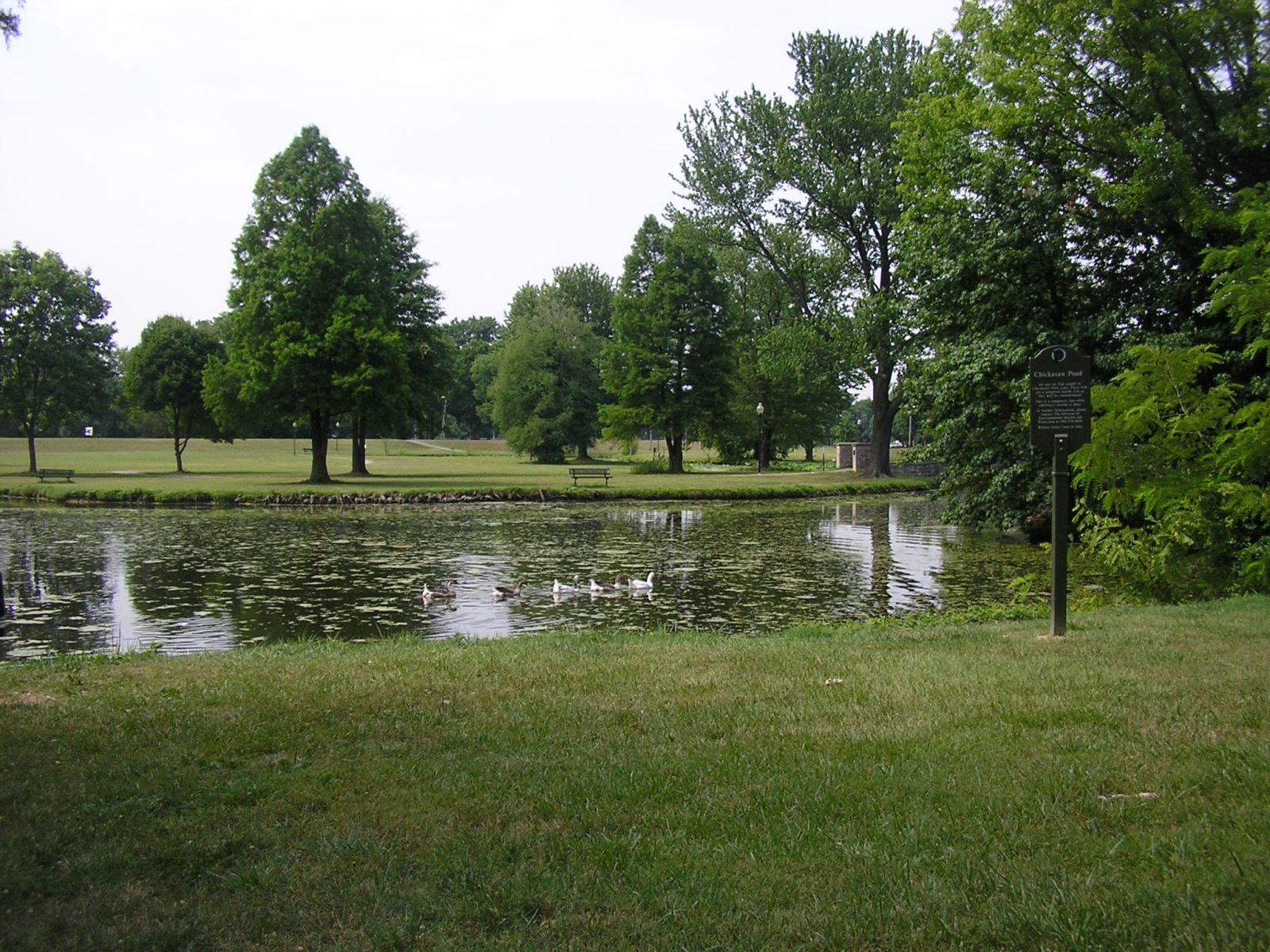
- Chickasaw Park's fishing pond
- Interactive map of Chickasaw Park
- Type: Municipal park
- Location: Louisville, Kentucky
- Coordinates: 38°14′32″N 85°49′54″W
- Area: 61 acres (25 ha)
- Created: 1923
- Operator: Metro Parks

Chickasaw Park is a municipal park in Louisville, Kentucky's west end. It is fronted to the west by the Ohio River and by Southwestern Parkway to the east. It was formerly the country estate of political boss John Henry Whallen, and began development as a park in 1923, but was not completed until the 1930s. The original plan for Chickasaw Park was designed by the Frederick Law Olmsted firm and is part of the Olmsted Park System, but was a later addition, as Shawnee, Iroquois, and Cherokee Parks were designed in the 1880s by Frederick Law Olmsted himself.

The City Parks Commission passed a resolution in 1924 making Chickasaw Park and a few other small parks black-only and making the larger parks in the city white-only. In the wake of the Supreme Court's decision in Brown v. Board of Education, the NAACP aided three Louisville residents in suing the city over the inequalities between the white- and black-only parks in Louisville. The park was desegregated by Mayor Andrew Broaddus in 1955.

The park features the city's only free clay tennis courts. Other features include a basketball court, a pond, a sprayground, two playgrounds, a lodge, and two picnic pavilions. World champion boxer and Louisville native Muhammad Ali was known to run in Chickasaw Park, and grew up on Grand Avenue, in the Chickasaw neighborhood. In 1969, Elmer Lucille Allen, a scientist and artist from the Chickasaw neighborhood organized the Chickasaw Little League. Because the Shawnee Little League was closed to children living south of Broadway, Allen organized an integrated Little League for her sons and area children. It was in operation for 3–4 years.

== Park improvements ==
In 2024, the park's pond was reopened after an improvement project, supported by federal funding from the American Rescue Plan Act. The pond was drained, dredged, and expanded, and infrastructure around the pond was upgraded.

In November 2025, the Olmsted Parks Conservancy announced it had received an anonymous $5 million donation—the second largest in the organization's history—for a complete restoration of Chickasaw Park.

== 2023 shooting ==
A shooting took place at the park in 2023, killing two and wounding four. No arrests have been made, and one year after the shooting, some family and friends of the victims expressed frustration about the lack of progress in the ensuing investigation. The shooting occurred less than a week after a separate shooting at a bank, also in Louisville.
