= 1968 Louisville riots =

Unrest in Parkland after Martin Luther King Jr.'s assassination

- Part of the King assassination riots
- Date: May 27–29, 1968
- Location: Louisville, Kentucky, United States
- Caused by: Assassination of Martin Luther King Jr.

Parties
State of Kentucky; Kentucky National Guard; Louisville Police Department	Rioters and looters

Casualties
- Deaths: 2 civilians
- Arrested: 472

Louisville, Kentucky experienced three days of rioting in May 1968. As in many other cities around the country, there were unrest and riots partially in response to the assassination of Martin Luther King Jr., on April 4. On May 27, a group of 400 people, mostly blacks, gathered at 28th and Greenwood Streets, in the Parkland neighborhood. The intersection, and Parkland in general, had recently become an important location for Louisville's black community, as the local NAACP branch had moved its office there.

The crowd was protesting against the possible reinstatement of a white officer who had been suspended for beating a black man some weeks earlier. Several community leaders arrived and told the crowd that no decision had been reached, and alluded to disturbances in the future if the officer was reinstated. By 8:30, the crowd began to disperse.

However, rumors (which turned out to be untrue) were spread that Student Nonviolent Coordinating Committee speaker Stokely Carmichael's plane to Louisville was being intentionally delayed by whites. After bottles were thrown by the crowd, the crowd became unruly and police were called. However the small and unprepared police response simply upset the crowd more, which continued to grow. The police, including a captain who was hit in the face by a bottle, retreated, leaving behind a patrol car, which was turned over and burned.

By midnight, rioters had looted stores as far east as Fourth Street, overturned cars and started fires.

Within an hour, Mayor Kenneth A. Schmied requested 700 Kentucky National Guard troops and established a citywide curfew. Violence and vandalism continued to rage the next day, but had subdued somewhat by May 29. Business owners began to return, although troops remained until June 4. Police made 472 arrests related to the riots. Two black teenage rioters had died, and $200,000 in damage had been done.

The disturbances had a longer-lasting effect. Most white business owners quickly pulled out or were forced, by the threat of racial violence, out of Parkland and surrounding areas. Most white residents also left the West End, which had been almost entirely white north of Broadway, from subdivision until the 1960s. The riot would have effects that shaped the image which whites would hold of Louisville's West End, that it was predominantly black.

== See also ==
- 1968 Washington, D.C. riots
- Baltimore riot of 1968
- Bloody Monday
- History of Louisville, Kentucky
- List of incidents of civil unrest in the United States
- List of riots
- Protests of 1968
- NAACP in Kentucky
