= California, Louisville =

Neighborhood in Louisville, Kentucky

Coordinates: 38°14′37″N 85°47′03″W

California is a neighborhood in urban Louisville, Kentucky, United States. It is bounded on the north by Broadway, on the east by Ninth Street, on the south by Oak Street, and on the west by Twenty-Sixth Street. There are no written records of the beginning of the neighborhood, but the area was settled by German immigrants around 1849. It is said that the subdivision, initially called Henderson, came to be known as California because it was the "far west" of Louisville.

African Americans settled the area after the Civil War, starting the California Colored School and a branch of the Freedmen's Bureau. The early population was mixed between whites and blacks, but white families began to leave around 1900. The neighborhood lost 50% of its population and 40% of its single-family housing from 1950 to 1980 and became known for its urban decay.

California has been the subject of urban renewal efforts, including those by the Brown-Forman Corporation, whose headquarters and warehouse is located in the neighborhood.

A commercial neighborhood arose at 18th Street (Dixie Highway) and Oak. Both Madden Hardware and the Oak Theater were on the east side of 18th.
