= Shawnee Park =

Municipal park in Louisville, Kentucky

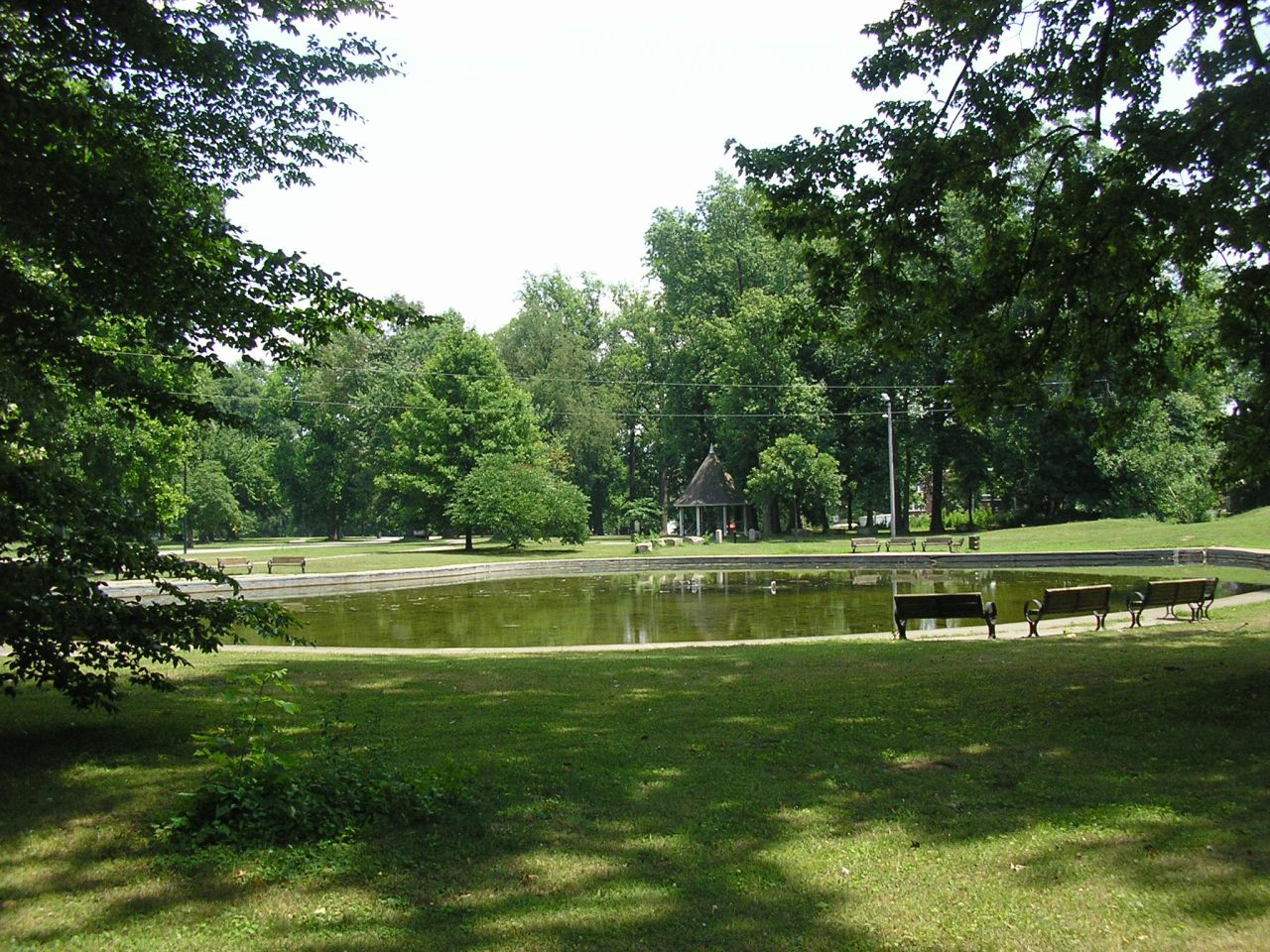
- Pond and Shelter in Shawnee Park
- Interactive map of Shawnee Park
- Type: Urban park
- Location: West Louisville, Kentucky
- Coordinates: 38.261090°N 85.829372°W
- Area: 284 acres (1.15 km^{2})
- Created: 1892
- Operator: Louisville Metro Parks
- Status: Open

Shawnee Park is a municipal park in Louisville, Kentucky. It was designed by Frederick Law Olmsted, who designed 18 of the city's 123 public parks. Along with the rest of the city's Olmsted-designed park system, Shawnee Park was added to the National Register of Historic Places in 1982.

== History ==
Shawnee Park was proposed in 1890 to be one of the three flagship parks (in addition to Cherokee Park and Iroquois Park) in Louisville's new park system. All three were located on the geographic edges of the city, in Shawnee's case it was the western edge bordering the Ohio River. The land at the time was still mostly used for truck farms, but it was clear residential development was imminent even without the park. Shawnee was the slowest of the parks to develop, as much of the land was already owned by investors who figured they could increase the sale price by holding out.

The city had to condemn the properties to acquire the land for park, and won its case in 1895. In 1896, the city began to create access to the park, another area in which Shawnee was lagging behind the other two parks. River Park Drive was paved in 1899, but the Broadway entrance remained unfinished until 1914.

The Olmsted firm initially advised the city not to build a golf course at Shawnee Park due to the "grave danger to visitors in the park and especially the children" but demand was such that the course was built anyway in 1927.

All three parks had the intended effect of spurring residential development near them. The interest was so great that developers found themselves advertising the parks rather than their own developments, as the highest prices would exist for the park perceived to be best. Dozens of subdivisions were built near Shawnee Park, and the neighborhood itself came to be called Shawnee.

Shawnee Park was legally restricted to whites from 1924 to 1954, although park officials and police had a de facto policy of denying blacks access to the park for some years prior to that. The only sizable park blacks were allowed access to was nearby Chickasaw Park, which many people entered by traveling through Shawnee.

== Features ==
=== Great Lawn ===
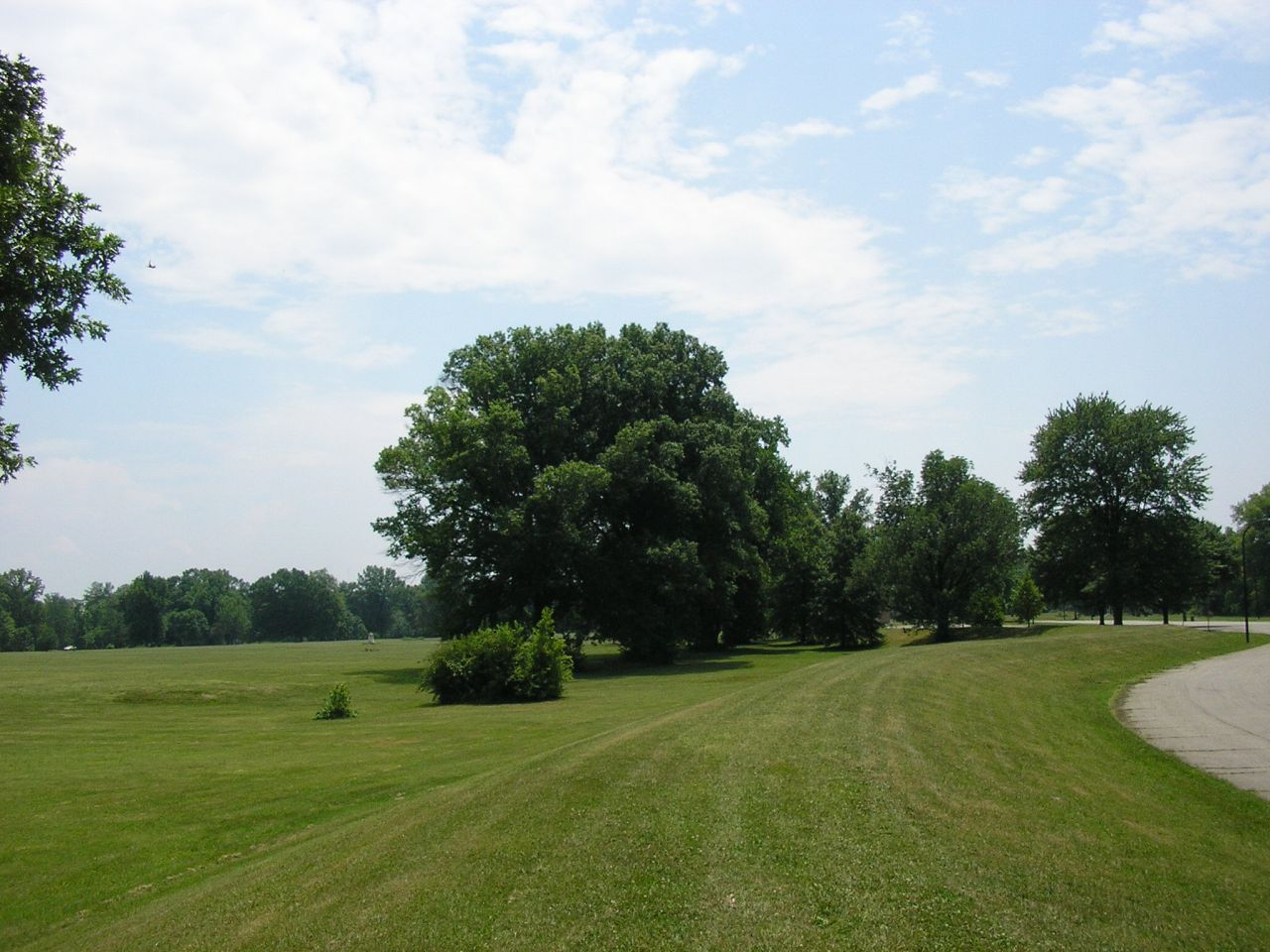
Shawnee's Great Lawn

Although now overshadowed by the Louisville Waterfront Park, Shawnee boasts an expansive Great Lawn which is very useful for formal gatherings. The Great Lawn, the principal feature of the park, is enclosed by plantings and a circular drive that is lined with trees.

=== Riverwalk Trail ===
Louisville's Riverwalk Trail, which passes through Shawnee Park, extends across Louisville's waterfront, which is an extensive, mostly flat pedestrian pathway. The one-way distance between the Belvedere and Shawnee Park is 6.2 miles (10.0 km).

== See also ==
- City of Parks
- List of attractions and events in the Louisville metropolitan area
- List of parks in the Louisville metropolitan area
