= Louisville Metro EMS =

Life support provider based in Kentucky

- Motto: "Louisville's Lifeline"
- Established: 2005
- Headquarters: Louisville, Kentucky
- Jurisdiction: Louisville-Jefferson County
- Total area (sq. miles): 399
- Dept. type: Public
- Employees: 300
- BLS or ALS: BLS/ALS tiered
- Ambulances: 8-12
- Fly-cars: staffed as needed
- Director: Edward J. Meiman, III
- Medical director: Raymond Orthober, M.D.
- Responses: 129,534 (2020)
- Website: www.louisvilleky.gov/ems

Louisville Metro Emergency Medical Services is the primary provider of pre-hospital life support and emergency care within Louisville-Jefferson County, Kentucky. LMEMS is a governmental department that averages 90,000 calls for service, both emergency and non-emergency, each year.

The current agency executive head is Edward J. Meiman, III and the chief of service is Colonel Jesse Yarbrough, EMT-P.

== History ==
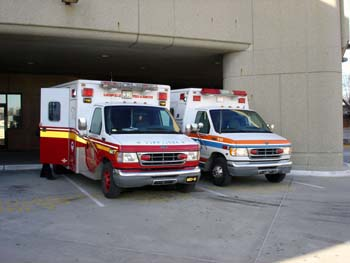
LFD (left) and JCEMS (right) ambulances at UofL Hospital

Louisville Metro EMS has its history rooted in the two major EMS providers that served the area since the earliest days of pre-hospital care of the 1970s.

Police officers transferred the severely ill or injured to hospitals in Louisville and Jefferson County until 1972 when the Jefferson County Medical Society created the first EMS service. The first licensed paramedics in Kentucky graduated in 1975 from a pilot program at Louisville General Hospital, now University of Louisville Hospital. Included were fifteen City of Louisville EMS paramedics and one Jefferson County Police officer paramedic.

=== City of Louisville ===
Louisville police officers transported patients for many years until Louisville EMS (LEMS) was created in 1974. The Park-Duvalle Neighborhood Health Center In 1968 provided ambulance service first to just patients with in their service area, then eventually to the city. The service was taken over by Louisville government. The program was operated by the city and Robert Shaver PhD was recruited as its founder and first Director, as well as Director of Public Health, and disaster planning, and was the first EMS service provided in Louisville. Dr. Shaver created a unique first response system staffed by registered nurses who were housed in Medi-cars and operated under the guidance of advanced medical directives. In 1995 the city transferred EMS duties to the Louisville Division of Fire in an effort to streamline emergency services in the city. The EMS bureau of the Louisville Division of Fire utilized firefighters cross-trained as EMTs and paramedics as well as non-firefighting personnel.

=== Jefferson County ===
Jefferson County EMS had its beginnings in the now-defunct Jefferson County Police Department. Beginning with police officer paramedics in 1975 and eventually evolving into non-law enforcement personnel assigned only to providing emergency medical care, the Emergency Medical Squad of the county police became Jefferson County Emergency Medical Services (JCEMS) in 1987.

JCEMS provided emergency medical services to all areas within Jefferson County outside of the cities of Louisville, Anchorage and Jeffersontown. JCEMS always fielded ambulances containing at least one paramedic. The JCEMS Disaster Response Team (DRT) responded to all hazardous materials and technical rescue incidents within Jefferson County outside of the City of Louisville. After the creation of LMEMS all hazardous materials responsibilities, along with specialized vehicles and equipment, were transferred to the Jefferson County Fire Service.

=== City-county merger and Louisville Metro EMS ===
The merger of the governments of the City Louisville and Jefferson County took place on January 6, 2003. The most visible (and publicized) merger activity of the new government was the integration of the county and city police forces. No pre-merger preparations were made in regards to emergency medical services. Immediately after the merger, the Louisville Fire Department EMS and Jefferson County EMS continued to operate separately as before. The new Metro Mayor, Jerry Abramson, eventually appointed a task force to review the current EMS practices and determine in what manner EMS will be provided in the new consolidated government. The fire services in Louisville-Jefferson County were (and still are) unable to be combined as nineteen of the twenty fire departments are independent of Metro government and were not subject to any merger legislation. The findings of the EMS task force presented several methods of EMS delivery. Included ideas were retaining two separate services, tasking the Louisville Division of Fire to provide EMS coverage to the entire city-county, the subordination of EMS duties to another "parent" organization such as the police or health departments, or the creation of a stand-alone department. After much debate, the mayor's office chose to create a new department and Louisville Metro EMS was created on February 5, 2005, by the combining the Louisville Fire Department EMS Bureau and Jefferson County Emergency Medical Services.

=== 2015 restructuring ===
In February 2015, with the departure of Dr Neil Richmond, the agency's first executive head, Metro Government combined the emergency medical services with Emergency Management Agency to create "Louisville Metro Emergency Services." Emergency Services combines 911 call-taking, all radio dispatching, and LMEMS into a single agency. The new agency, despite its inclusive name, does not include the police or fire department which remain entirely separate. The job of chief executive officer, heretofore both the agency director and the medical director, was eliminated and the jobs again separated. The executive assistant director of Emergency Management Agency was given ultimate charge of LMEMS and a part-time physician hired to perform medical direction.

== Services ==
LMEMS is a full-time provider of Basic Life Support (BLS) and Advanced Life Support (ALS) and is accessible through the 9-1-1 system. LMEMS employs an entirely full-time workforce of Kentucky-licensed Emergency Medical Technicians (EMTs) and paramedics (also known as EMT-Ps). Most employees maintain optional certification by the National Registry of EMTs, a national EMS accreditation association.

LMEMS provides transportation to the emergency department of the chosen hospital. LMEMS does not return patients home nor does it offer transportation to immediate care centers or hospitals without emergency departments. All scheduled ambulance service and inter-facility transports are handled by private ambulance companies retained by the patient. Only under exceptional circumstances will LMEMS provide hospital-to-hospital transfers.

=== Skills ===
Louisville Metro EMS utilizes two levels of care providers. EMT-Basics (referred to as technicians or EMTs) and EMT-Paramedics (usually just called paramedics) have drastically different scopes of practice but all exist to provide care and transportation to the sick and injured. A technician specializes in ambulance operation and basic life support care as well assistance to advanced providers. Most technicians have an initial six months of training receiving at least 110 hours of formal classroom training, often reaching or exceeding 120 or 168 hours, with some training institutions requiring initial unspecified numerous clinical hours within a hospital. Basic Emergency Medical Technicians are required to pass skills training and are required to challenge the National Registry of Emergency Medical Technicians exam to become NREMT certified. Paramedics use complex diagnostics, perform medical procedures, and administer medications and additional advanced care that would otherwise only be provided by an emergency physician. Paramedics in Kentucky generally have three years of initial training including at least 750 hours of internship and clinical instruction in addition to about 1200 hours of formal, classroom instruction. An increasing number of paramedics possess at least an associates degree, many have bachelor's degrees.

Technicians are trained to operate independently of a paramedic, and when such situations arise they are capable of caring for and transporting any medical emergency to the hospital on their own.

Although the Kentucky Board of Emergency Medical Services allows for the use of EMT-Intermediate providers, LMEMS does not utilize this mid-level of care provider.

== Structure ==
=== Ranks ===
LMEMS is a subordinate entity of an umbrella organization called Emergency Services. LMEMS is headed by the director, who serves as the agency head (much like a commissioner, superintendent, etc. in a law enforcement agency or other agencies). This organization follows the structure of the United States Military. When wearing an EMS uniform, the director of Emergency Services has the rank of colonel and wears a silver eagle insignia. Under the director of Emergency Services is the top uniformed officer holding the job of deputy director, utilizing the title of chief of service, and the deputy director also holds the rank of colonel (with gold eagle to indicate subordinate position to the director). This officer is the accepted chief of department. Traditionally, in the area, the chief of the emergency medical services is not addressed as "Chief" but as "Colonel" and styled "The Colonel". Under the director and deputy director there are several officers, with the assistant director of operations wearing the silver oak leaves of a lieutenant colonel. The operations commander wears the gold oak leaves of a major and oversees all day-to-day operations, including scheduling, and may be drawn upon to provide additional manpower. Other personnel include the operations executive officer, who has the rank of captain, operations field officer-paramedic who has the rank of lieutenant, and the operations field supervisor-technician, who has the rank of sergeant.

The rank insignia of LMEMS is as follows:

| Title | Insignia |
|---|---|
| Director of Emergency Services (colonel) | |
| Deputy director (chief of service) (colonel) | |
| Assistant llDirector of operations (lieutenant colonel) | |
| Operations commander (major) | |
| Operations executive officer (captain) | |
| Operations field officer – paramedic (lieutenant) | |
| Operations field supervisor – technician (sergeant) | |

- Regardless of rank an employee's skill level is denoted on the bottom edge of the right sleeve patch, either "Technician" or "Paramedic." A patch reading "Supervisor" was envisioned but never produced.

=== Union ===
LMEMS is a long-established "union shop" and all employees beneath the rank of lieutenant colonel can become members of the International Brotherhood of Teamsters (IBT) Local lodge #783, but all employees are required to pay a "Fair Share" contract support fee. Job assignments, shifts, and vacations are filled using a system based on seniority. However, an employee's tenure may be taken into account to determine suitability. Any employees' first twelve months of service with LMEMS is considered a probationary period where the new hire is subject to dismissal without union representation.

Several separate bargaining contracts exist within the service. Street operations personnel, including the majority of EMTs and paramedics and operations officers are covered by one contract. Ancillary services personnel in supply and billing have their own contract suited to their unique duties.

A chief and assistant chief steward are elected to oversee union matters for the entire service. Additional elected shop stewards are on duty at most times to assist members with concerns on a day-to-day basis.

== Mutual aid ==
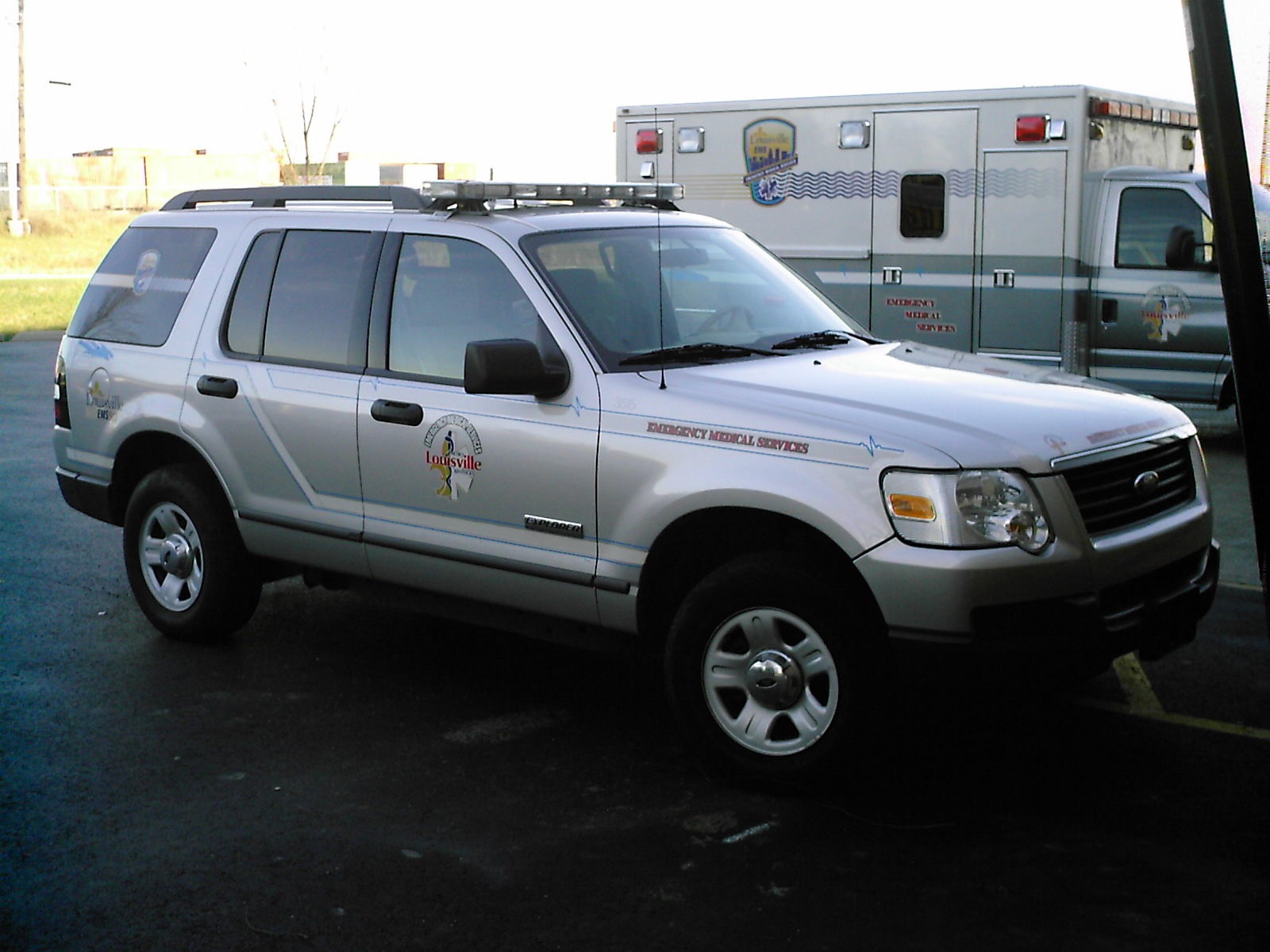
LMEMS Rapid Response "Fly-Car"

=== Fire service ===
LMEMS partners with the various fire departments and fire protection districts in the metro area in a cooperative effort to further reduce the amount of time from when a person calls for assistance to the time assistance arrives. The American Heart Association recommends early defibrillation to be beneficial to an individual suffering cardiac arrest and as such most fire apparatus carry automated external defibrillators (AEDs) with trained EMTs to begin stabilizing the patient prior to EMS arrival. Each fire department or fire district is independent and as such have varying response guidelines. Some agencies respond to only the most serious calls while others will respond on nearly every call.

=== Other ambulance services ===
Private ambulance services have provided both emergency response and inter-facility transfer services for Jefferson County. Historically, Mercury Ambulance, Mercy, Rural/Metro Corporation and Yellow EMS provided services for parts of areas near by or within Jefferson County. Yellow EMS and Rural/Metro both held contracts for 911 backup before those companies were closed or sold. In late 2025, Metro Government partnered with Ameripro Health to once again provide 911 backup. Ameripro Health has also contracted with several counties to provide all 911 response.

Local fire departments have developed EMS transport capabilities within Louisville-Jefferson County such as Anchorage Middletown EMS. Anchorage/Middletown EMS is an ambulance taxing district (as well as a fire protection taxing district) that serves the City of Anchorage as well as eastern Jefferson County with advanced life support services. Others include St. Matthews Fire, Pleasure Ridge Park Fire, Fern Creek Fire, Okolona Fire, and Zoneton Fire. Although these jurisdictions maintain their own ambulances, Louisville-Jefferson County government is ultimately responsible for ensuring emergency care is available. Each suburban fire district has a Memorandum of Understanding with the city, which describes where the department must respond, and may also dictate the protocols the agency must use.

LMEMS has provided mutual aid to other agencies as well. LMEMS paramedics are often called upon to provide assistance to BLS ambulance crews from other services and other counties when their own advanced providers are unavailable.

== Specialized teams ==
In addition to the primary task of providing emergency care and transportation, LMEMS also maintains employees assigned to provide specialized service such as Tactical Medics to the Louisville Metro Police Department (LMPD) Special Weapons and Tactics Team (SWAT), Dive Medics and Swift-Water Rescue Medics, as well as retaining a highly visible bicycle team. Personnel are also assigned to the federally administered Joint Emergency Service Unit which seeks to combine all aspects of public safety in a large area into one task force to better coordinate activities in the event of a major emergency.

== Deployment ==
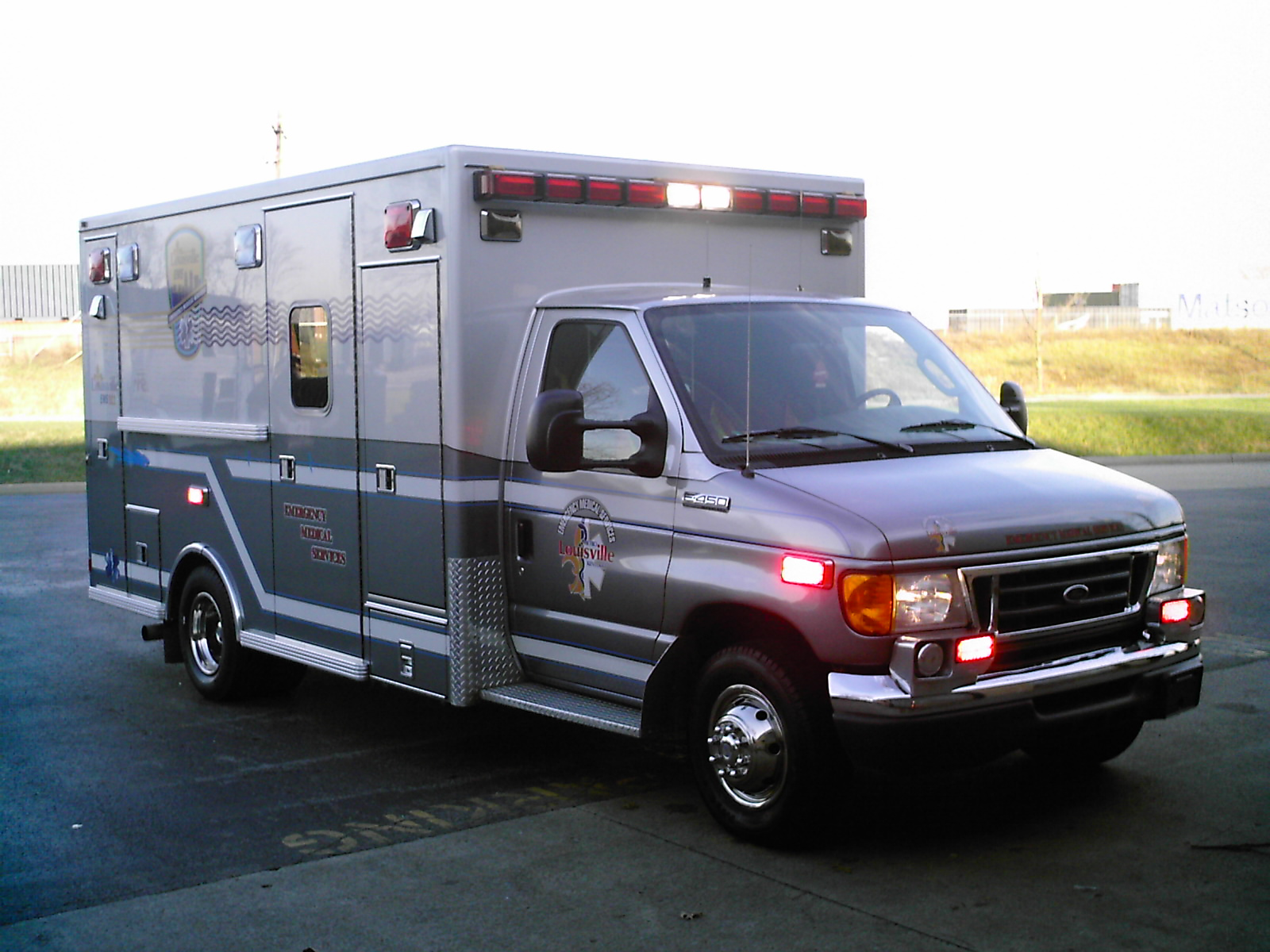
LMEMS Transport Ambulance

Ambulances may be staffed by two Emergency Medical Technicians, one Emergency Medical Technician and one paramedic or, rarely, two paramedics. There is also at least one "Chase car" staffed with a paramedic at any given time. Additional Chase-cars are staffed as need dictates. 2010 policy revisions state there must always be one supervisor per operations division but currently no more than two are ever on duty simultaneously. This leaves at least one division without a supervisor on a recurring basis.

=== Equipment ===
==== Ground transportation ====
LMEMS utilizes a fleet of modular ambulances manufactured by Lifeline Emergency Vehicles from Sumner, Iowa and Ford Explorer response vehicles called chase-cars. Currently three styles of ambulances are in use. Specimens of the former LFD and JCEMS (slant-sided) ambulance types remain in use until retirement with new paint and striping. The newest (post-merger) ambulances retain the straight-side feature of the former LFD type and are taller, longer, and heavier. In 2012, Ford Motor Company announced they would no longer manufacture the Econoline van ambulance prep package and subsequently LMEMS has opted to begin procuring Type I vehicles based on the F-450 pickup truck chassis. The first delivery of Type I ambulances occurred in 2013.

Most LMEMS response vehicles, including all ambulances, are fitted with satellite transponders that constantly track the exact location of the vehicle, map the potential route to a call, and determine which unit is closest to the emergency. The ambulances have emergency lights and sirens along with air horns to help them warn motorists to move over. They also have radios to communicate with other LMEMS units and mutual aid Fire and Police Agencies as well as the dispatcher.

All ambulances are stocked with a full complement of advanced life support equipment including LifePak 15 Cardiac Monitors and Defibrillators, Emergency Medications, Intubation and Airway Supplies, CPR devices and other medical equipment. Each ambulance can transport up to three fully immobilized patients. All crew members are trained and equipped with protective gear to treat patients potentially contaminated with hazardous materials.

All charting and patient care information is collected and distributed electronically, eliminating paperwork and reducing the possibility of patient privacy compromise. Electrocardiographs (EKG) can be transmitted wirelessly from the cardiac monitor to the receiving hospital in the advance of the patient's arrival.

=== Area of responsibility and divisions ===
Louisville Metro EMS has the largest area of geographical responsibility of any Louisville Metro public safety agency. It is the sole provider of emergency medical services to 96.5% of the 399 square miles (1,000 km^{2}) of Louisville-Jefferson County. The cities of Anchorage, Jeffersontown, and St. Matthews maintain their own EMS providers, however, LMEMS is required to ensure a response if these providers are unable.

Divisions of Louisville Metro EMS
| Division Two | St. Matthews (Medic 211), Middletown (Medic 112), Lyndon and Graymoor-Devondale (Medic 113), Berrytown-English Station (Medic 119), Downtown (Medic 151), Camp Taylor and Germantown-Schnitzelburg (Medic 161), Clifton-Crescent Hill (Medic 162), Buchertown and The Highlands (Medic 277), and Douglass, western Hikes Point and Bowman Field (Medic 175), Okolona (Medic 121), Highview (Medic 123), Newburg, Watterson Park (Medic 225), Buechel (Medic 127), and Fern Creek (Medic 126). |
| Division Four | Beechmont(Medic 163), Iroquois and Auburndale (Medic 267), University of Louisville (Medic 274), Smoketown (Medic 255), Pleasure Ridge Park (Medic 131), Valley Station (Medic 132), Fairdale (Medic 135), Shively (Medic 137), Shawnee (Medic 141). Russell (Medic 243), Portland (Medic 145), and California (Medic 147). |

=== Continuity of coverage ===
Not all locations have ambulances on station at all times. Alternatively, response cars may be placed with a single paramedic or technician instead of an ambulance.

== Communications ==
All LMEMS resources are dispatched and tracked by MetroSafe, a unit of Metro Government that coexists within the Emergency Services that handles all public safety communications. Previously many separate dispatch centers existed staffed by the individual agencies they served. MetroSafe puts, for the first time in area history, all emergency call-taking and radio dispatching under one roof. In addition to radio telecommunications MetroSafe is the primary answering point for all 911 calls placed inside Louisville-Jefferson County.

=== Two-way radio ===
The current Louisville Metro public safety radio system is a Motorola Project 25-compliant trunking system. Voice encryption is used for many channels including all those used by LMEMS, thus radio traffic cannot be received using a scanner. By using voice encryption the chances of protected health information (PHI) being compromised by unauthorized monitoring is greatly reduced.

== Response ==
By department procedure, response requests are assigned to LMEMS resources based on their proximity to the incident and the skill level anticipated by using information gathered from the caller. When a BLS unit is closer to an incident believed to require advanced care an additional ambulance (or, if available, a chase-car) containing a paramedic is also dispatched. Using information gathered from the call, assigned resources are also instructed response with red lights and siren (termed Code-3) or without lights and siren (termed Code-1). If the BLS ambulance crew first arrives and determines that advanced care is not needed the ALS resource may be canceled and ready to respond elsewhere. Patients are transported to any of the area hospitals either Code-1 or Code-3. The decision to use, or not to use, lights and siren en route to the hospital is at the sole discretion of the crew.

=== Area hospitals ===
Current hospitals served by Louisville Metro EMS include:

- the five hospitals and a pediatric outpatient medical center owned by Norton Healthcare
  - Norton Children's Hospital (downtown Louisville)
  - Norton Children's Medical Center (Springhurst, Louisville)
  - Norton Women's and Children's Hospital (St Matthews, Louisville)
  - Norton Hospital (downtown Louisville)
  - Norton Brownsboro Hospital (Springhurst, Louisville)
  - Norton Audubon Hospital (City of Audubon, Louisville)
- the hospitals of UofL Health
  - University of Louisville Hospital, the region's level 1 trauma center.
  - Saints Mary and Elizabeth Hospital (Beechmont, Louisville)
  - Jewish Hospital (downtown Louisville)
  - Jewish Medical Center-East (St Matthews, Louisville)
  - Jewish Medical Center-Southwest (Valley Station, Louisville)
  - Jewish Medical Center-South (Brooks, KY)
  - Jewish Hospital-Shelbyville (Shelbyville, KY)
- the hospitals of Baptist Healthcare
  - Baptist Health – Louisville (St Matthews, Louisville)
  - Baptist Health – LaGrange (LaGrange, KY)
  - Baptist Health – Floyd (New Albany, Indiana)
- The U.S. Department of Veterans Affairs Louisville Medical Center (Clifton, Louisville).

== See also ==
- Jefferson County Fire Service
- Jefferson Co EMS (defunct)
- City of Louisville EMS (defunct)
- Louisville Division of Fire
- Louisville Metro Police Department
