= Jefferson County EMS =

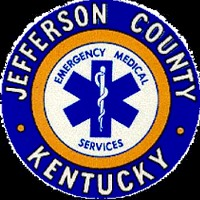
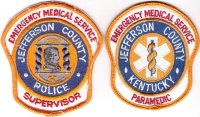

Jefferson County Emergency Medical Services was the primary advanced life support provider for Jefferson County, Kentucky outside the limits of the City of Louisville. The merger of Jefferson County Government with the City of Louisville brought about the combining of JCEMS with the EMS bureau of the Louisville Division of Fire to form Louisville Metro EMS in early 2005. Therefore, as a separate and distinct entity, it no longer exists.

== History ==
For many years the emergency care and transportation of the sick and injured was a duty performed by the Jefferson County Police Department. Though an ancillary function of regular patrol work for most of the departments history, Emergency medical services in Jefferson County, as it is known today, began in 1973 with the establishment of the EMS as a defined division of the police.

Under the direction of Captain Leo Goss, several police officers were certified as Emergency Medical Technicians and the tradition of fielding station wagon "stretcher cars" was continued. Stretcher cars did not allow for care to be provided en route to the hospital but did allow a safer and faster mode of transportation. Later, modular and van-mounted ambulances were staffed as combination patrol/patient transport vehicles. During this time it was not unusual to be issued a traffic citation by an ambulance crew.

Advanced Life Support was introduced in 1975 when Officer William "Bill" Wetter was licensed along with fifteen City of Louisville Emergency medical services personnel as the first emergency Paramedics in the Commonwealth of Kentucky. Ofc. Wetter continued as the only advanced life support provider for nearly a year before more officers were certified as paramedics and placed into active service. Shortly thereafter the police department began hiring non-law enforcement persons to staff basic life support ambulances. In instances where the paramedic officer was needed to provide advanced care he could park his cruiser and ride to the hospital in the ambulance to be returned to his vehicle later. In 1978 Non-sworn paramedics were being hired and the police officers' function in front-line care was relegated to administrative duties and on-scene first response.

By the mid-1980s the need for Emergency medical services by the community out-stripped the ability of the police department to effectively manage it as a subdivision and the decision was made by then County Judge/Executive Harvey Sloane to remove Emergency medical services duties from the police department. In 1987 Jefferson County Emergency Medical Services was established as a de jure department of county government. Michael "Mike" Riordan, one of the first non-sworn paramedics, was named as its first (and only) chief. Riordan served in the capacity as head of department until JCEMS was combined with the EMS bureau of the Louisville Division of Fire as Louisville Metro EMS (LMEMS) in 2005. Riordan also served as Director of Operations of LMEMS for a short time thereafter until retiring.

== Notes ==
- JCEMS was an "all ALS service" for its entire existence meaning all ambulances fielded included at least one Paramedic on board. This type of staffing did not require the use of extra response vehicles specifically for advanced life support providers.
- The distinctive "slant-sided" profile of Jefferson County's ambulances was actually attributed to a design by JCEMS employees. This style of ambulance has been copied and used elsewhere around the United States. Proponents of the slanted sides claim they allow a lower center of gravity. Consequently, the vehicle displays less tendency to sway side-to-side and reduces roll-over potential.
- JCEMS's Disaster Response Team (DRT) performed all hazardous materials response inside Jefferson County (outside of the City of Louisville), a function carried over from previous police department responsibilities. DRT often responded outside of the county at the request of other agencies.
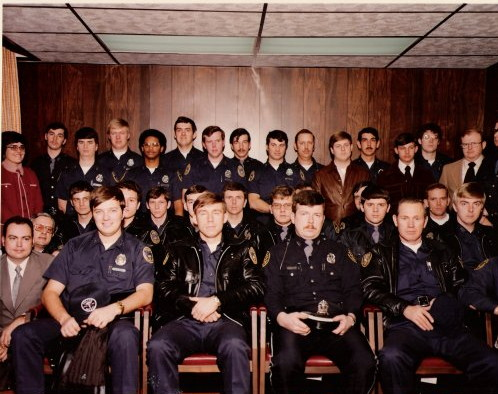

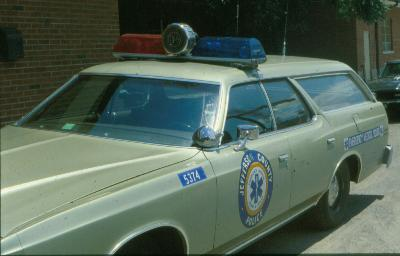

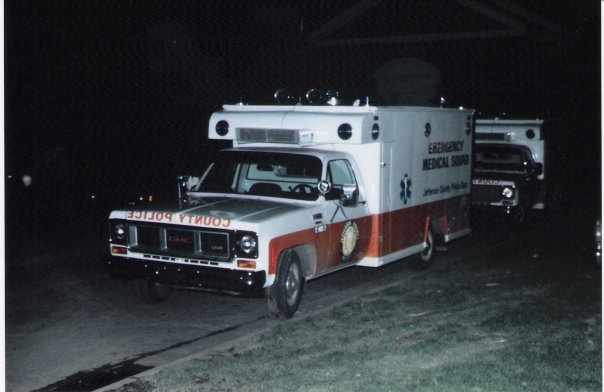

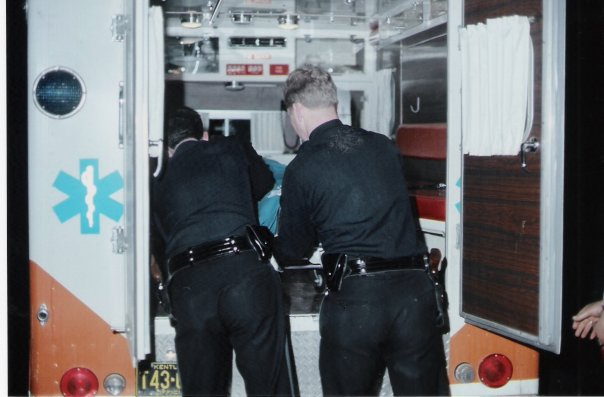

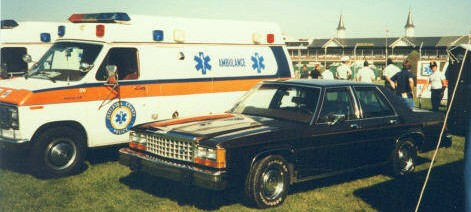

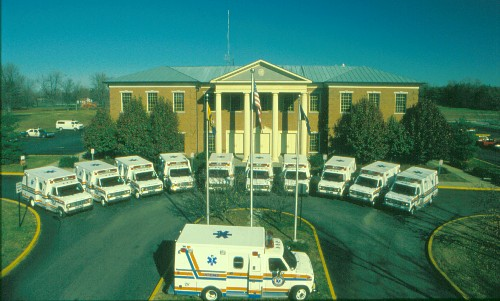

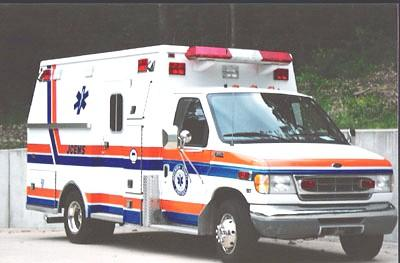

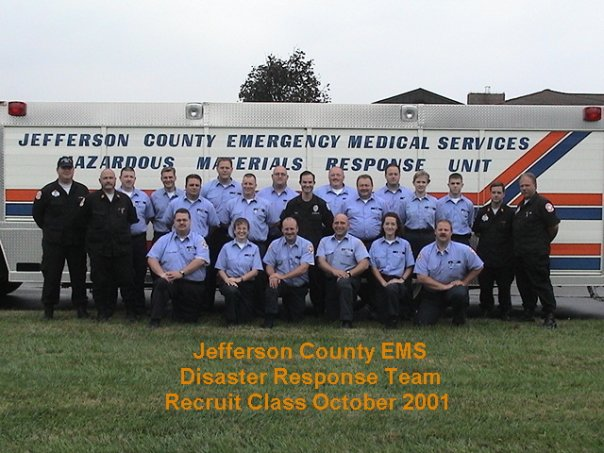
