= Jefferson County Fire Service =

Operational area
- Country: United States of America
- State: Kentucky
- County: Jefferson County

Agency overview
- Established: 1947
- Employees: 418 Career; 433 Volunteers
- Staffing: Combination
- EMS level: BLS & ALS
- Motto: "Dedication, Loyalty, Honor"

Facilities and equipment
- Stations: 43 Active
- Engines: 35 Engines + 14 Reserve; 3 Squrts + 2 Reserve; 1 Snozzle + 0 Reserve; 2 Quads + 2 Reserve
- Trucks: 0 + 1 Reserve
- Tillers: 3 + 0 Reserve
- Platforms: 1 + 0 Reserve
- Quints: 12 Quints + 3 Reserve; 1 Telesqurts + 2 Reserve
- Ambulances: 24 ALS; 2 BLS; 7 Spare
- Tenders: 2 + 0 Reserve
- Fireboats: 1
- Light and air: 1

Website
- jeffcofire.com

The Jefferson County Fire Service (abbreviated as JCFS and known locally as "County Fire" or "Suburban Fire") is an organization that coordinates the independent fire protection districts in Jefferson County, Kentucky. The JCFS was formed for the purpose of mutual aid, dispatch, training, and local standardization. The Shively Fire Department is the only suburban department that has not joined the JCFS; it uses the same dispatch and radio channels as the Louisville Division of Fire.

== History ==
=== Jefferson County Fire Department ===
Before 1947 Jefferson County Fiscal Court operated the Jefferson County Fire Department. The department operated three engine companies from three stations equally spread across the unincorporated county land.

==== Fire Taxing Districts ====
A chapter of Kentucky's codified set of laws, the Kentucky Revised Statutes allows for the incorporation of fire protection taxing districts in otherwise unincorporated areas. As the population of Jefferson County grew after World War II, small communities began to believe the services of the county fire department were wholly inadequate for their growing needs. These communities secured the votes necessary to establish fire protection districts. The districts levied a tax based on a property owner's total real estate worth and allowed for more money to be available exclusively for fire protection. Eventually, 21 separate districts were formed, completely covering all of Jefferson County outside of the Cities of Louisville and Shively. Since it was now unnecessary Jefferson County Fiscal Court disbanded the county fire department completely in 1964.

=== Mergers ===
==== Effects of the 2003 Louisville – Jefferson County merger ====
The 2003 merger of Louisville and Jefferson County governments did little to affect the Jefferson County fire districts. Since then, other non-official names for JCFS have been coined such as "Louisville Metro Suburban Fire" and the "Suburban Division, Louisville Metro Fire"; however, since Louisville Metro Government has no direct control over the suburban fire departments, such references would be inaccurate and possibly misleading.

The merger legislation permits the continuing existence of all governmental subdivisions of the county including cities and fire protection districts. It does, however, prohibit the incorporation of new ones. Consequently, true "mergers" of districts are not possible since a new governmental entity would necessarily be created, although several districts have chosen to dissolve and to be absorbed by neighboring districts.

Of the 21 fire protection districts extant in 2003, by mid-2021 over half had dissolved or were merged into other departments.

==== 2003: Okolona – Black Mudd ====
The Okolona Fire Protection District absorbed the Black Mudd Fire District in 2003. Black Mudd station 1 became Okolona station 3.

==== 2004: Pleasure Ridge Park – South Dixie ====
The Pleasure Ridge Park Fire Protection District absorbed the South Dixie Fire District in July 2004. South Dixie station 1 became Pleasure Ridge Park station 7, and South Dixie station 2 became Pleasure Ridge Park station 8.

==== 2005: Okolona – Edgewood ====
The Edgewood Fire District merged into the Okolona Fire Protection District in 2005. Edgewood station 1 became Okolona station 4. In 2010, this station was closed and torn down.

==== 2011: Lake Dreamland – Dixie Suburban ====
Dixie Suburban merged into the Lake Dreamland fire department in July 2011. Dixie Suburban station 1 became Lake Dreamland station 3, which currently serves as a storage and training facility.

==== 2018: East End mergers ====
===== Anchorage – Middletown =====
On March 1, 2018, Louisville Mayor Greg Fischer signed the executive order making the merger between Anchorage Fire & EMS and the Middletown Fire Protection District official. The Anchorage Middletown Fire & EMS Department is headquartered on Urton Lane, formerly home to Middletown Station 1.

===== Jeffersontown – McMahan =====
On July 1, 2018, Jeffersontown Fire Department absorbed the McMahan Fire Protection District, which began operating in the Hikes Point area in 1955.

===== St. Matthews – Lyndon =====
The Lyndon Fire Protection District merged into the St. Matthews Fire Protection District on July 1, 2018. With this merger, St. Matthews Fire and Rescue became responsible for fire protection services in the areas of St. Matthews, Lyndon, Hurstbourne, Norbourne Estates, Indian Hills, Graymoor Devondale, Plantation, Rolling Hills, Westwood, and Bellemeade.

==== 2019: East End mergers ====
On April 17, 2019, the boards of trustees for the Anchorage Middletown Fire & EMS Department, and the Eastwood, Harrods Creek and Worthington fire districts voted to merge the latter three into the Anchorage Middletown department; the expanded department then merged, on July 1, 2019, making 11 stations covering 92 square miles of the East End of Jefferson County. Anchorage Middletown Chief Andy Longstreet remains as chief of the department, while the Eastwood, Harrods Creek and Worthington chiefs have taken on management roles within the expanded department.

==== 2020: Lake Dreamland merger ====
In June 2020, Lake Dreamland Fire Department was annexed by Pleasure Ridge Park (PRP) Fire Protection District. The annexation would allow the now defunct Lake Dreamland Fire Department to fully staff a Fire Engine 24/7 in the District and, in the addition; A new 24/7 Advanced Life Support Ambulance crew. However, up until now there is not enough Paramedics available. The Ambulance unit remains BLS until further notice.

==== 2021: Camp Taylor merger ====
In 2021, Camp Taylor Fire Protection District merged with the Beuchel Fire District. The combined district is serviced by the Buechel Fire Department.

==== 2022: Fern Creek – Buechel ====
In July 2022, Buechel Fire-EMS Department merged into Fern Creek Fire & EMS.

== Organization ==
Member districts of JCFS include all departments within Louisville-Jefferson County organized under KRS Chapter 75.

Although not fire protection districts organized under Chapter 75 of the KRS, the City of Shively Fire Department and Louisville Division of Fire often participate with JCFS in training.

The JCFS is not a distinct fire department per se but a coordinating organization that facilitates cooperation among the suburban fire districts. JCFS does not have a chief or any type of hierarchy and has no binding executive or legislative authority over its membership. Instead it comprises various committees and associations that specialize in areas that affect the fire service in Jefferson County as a whole.

Most of the Jefferson County fire districts wear the Jefferson County Fire distinctive insignia patch on the right shoulder of their uniforms.

=== Fire departments ===
The Jefferson County Fire Service consists of 7 fire protection districts that collectively protect 333 square miles and 495,000 people, surrounding the original Louisville city limits:

- Anchorage Middletown
- Fairdale
- Fern Creek
- Jeffersontown
- Okolona
- Pleasure Ridge Park
- Saint Matthews

=== JCFS special teams ===
The Jefferson County Fire Service has special service teams that consist of members from various departments across the county. These special teams have their own tones and "department number". The JCFS Special Operations Team uses 2 "department numbers", 1 for their water rescue equipment trailers, and 1 for their collapse and trench rescue equipment trailers. While many departments carry special equipment in their own marked vehicles and trailers, the JCFS owns their own special equipment in JCFS marked vehicles & trailers. Though some trailers go under the "department number" of the department that owns the station it's located at, or have their own call-signs.

==== JCFS-owned vehicles and trailers ====
The JCFS owns 2 specialized vehicles (1 hazmat and 1 utility), along with many trailers carrying specialized equipment for special operations. Unit/Hazmat 6691 is currently located at and responds from Lake Dreamland Fire Protection District station 1, which has a close proximity to a local heavy industrial area known as Rubbertown. Unit 6691 is a 1993 Ford CF-8000/Betten that is ex-Jefferson County EMS. Unit/Utility 6697 is a utility that is located at and responds from Okolona Fire Protection District station 1. Okolona is centrally located along the southern border of Jefferson County. Unit 6697 is a 2001 Ford F-350/1977 E-One, with the chassis and cab being ex-Jefferson County EMS, and the body ex-South Dixie Fire Protection District. Unit 6697's main purpose is to pull trailers with special purpose/operations equipment.

==== JCFS Hazardous Materials Operations Team ====
The JCFS Hazardous Materials Operations Team consists of members from nearly all of the departments that are part of the JCFS.

==== JCFS Special Operations Team ====
The JCFS Special Operations Team consists of the JCFS's Water, Collapse, Trench, Confined Space, and Rope Rescue Operations Teams.

== Constituency ==
=== Mutual aid ===
The primary purpose of JCFS is to coordinate help and cooperation between the fire districts in fire suppression activities. The member district of JCFS have, through the years, integrated their response plans with one another to the extent that the districts de facto operate as one on the fireground. Newly adopted dispatching protocols disregard traditional district boundaries and direct the response of the closest, most appropriate fire equipment to a call for help. It is not uncommon to see fire apparatus from two or more districts on the scene of a routine fire call. Interoperability between the JCFS districts and Louisville Division of Fire is informal and the two organizations do not participate in the unified chain of command when operating together.

== Notable emergencies ==
=== April 3, 2015 major flooding and 8-Alarm GE Appliance Park fire ===
GE Appliance Park has completely removed building 6 after the fire, and they currently have no plans to rebuild the building or build a new building on the site.

== Other information ==
=== Fairdale High School Fire & EMS Academy ===
Fairdale High School offers a Fire & EMS program that introduces students to and prepares them for careers in emergency services. The academy often trains with local fire departments, and is active in the community. They have, for a long time, maintained a fully equipped and operational pumper. The current unit, Brutus II, is a 1990 Pierce Lance pumper with a 1500 GPM pump and a 1000-gallon water tank. This unit was donated by the Fairdale Fire District, where it served as Engine 9032.

Before Brutus II arrived, the program maintained Brutus. Brutus was donated to the school from the Pleasure Ridge Park Fire Department, where it served as Engine 2223. Brutus was a 1982 Duplex D-350/Grumman 1250/750.

=== Junior Firefighter Programs ===
Many of the Jefferson County Fire Service fire departments have an explorer program to allow kids, usually ages 16 to 18 to get a feel for what it is like to be a firefighter. They get hands on training, a state firefighter number, and their training hours get logged into the system. Currently, the Highview and Fairdale Fire Departments have official explorer/junior firefighter programs implemented and active. The (former) Middletown Fire Department, Okolona Fire Department, Buechel Fire Department, Fern Creek Fire Department, Edgewood Fire District, Camp Taylor Fire Department, Black Mudd Fire Department and the Eastwood Fire Department used to, but no longer have, an active program.

== See also ==
- Louisville Division of Fire
- Louisville Metro EMS
- Louisville Metro Police Department
- Shively, Kentucky
