= Steam Engine Company No. 20 =

Steam Engine Company No. 20 may refer to:

- Steam Engine Company No. 20 (1735 Bardstown Road), Louisville, Kentucky, listed on the National Register of Historic Places in Jefferson County, Kentucky, one of 18 Historic Firehouses of Louisville
- Steam Engine Company No. 20 (1330 Bardstown Road), Louisville, Kentucky, listed on the National Register of Historic Places in Jefferson County, Kentucky, one of 18 Historic Firehouses of Louisville
