= Jerry Abramson =

Kentucky politician (born 1946)

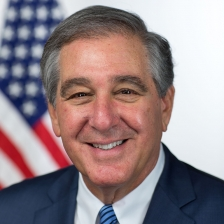

Director of the White House Office of Intergovernmental Affairs
- In office November 17, 2014 – January 20, 2017
- President: Barack Obama
- Preceded by: David Agnew
- Succeeded by: Justin Clark

55th Lieutenant Governor of Kentucky
- In office December 13, 2011 – November 13, 2014
- Governor: Steve Beshear
- Preceded by: Daniel Mongiardo
- Succeeded by: Crit Luallen

51st President of the United States Conference of Mayors
- In office 1993–1994
- Preceded by: William Althaus
- Succeeded by: Victor Ashe

55th & 57th Mayor of Louisville
- In office January 6, 2003 – January 3, 2011
- Preceded by: David Armstrong
- Succeeded by: Greg Fischer
- In office January 6, 1986 – January 4, 1999
- Preceded by: Harvey Sloane
- Succeeded by: David Armstrong

Personal details
- Born: Jerry Edwin Abramson; September 12, 1946 (age 80) Louisville, Kentucky, U.S.
- Party: Democratic
- Spouse: Madeline
- Education: Indiana University, Bloomington (BS); Georgetown University (JD)

Jerry Edwin Abramson (born September 12, 1946) is an American Democratic politician who served as the 55th lieutenant governor of Kentucky (2011–2014). He also served as the mayor of Louisville for an unprecedented two decades. He was the only person to serve three consecutive terms as mayor of the city of Louisville (1986–1999). He later served two terms as the first mayor of the consolidated city-county of "Louisville Metro" (2003–2011). He was also the first Jewish person to serve as mayor of Louisville.

Abramson's long period of service to Louisville as its mayor, as well as the weak opposition he faced in mayoral elections, led to the local nickname of "mayor for life", a title frequently used by Louisville's own popular radio personality Terry Meiners. Abramson's popularity resulted in Bluegrass Poll approval ratings ranging from a 91 percent high in 1990 to a 73 percent low in 1994.

From 1993 to 1994, Abramson was president of the United States Conference of Mayors. He was a member of the Mayors Against Illegal Guns Coalition, an organization formed in 2006 and co-chaired by New York City mayor Michael Bloomberg and Boston mayor Thomas Menino.

Abramson was elected lieutenant governor of Kentucky in 2011, taking office in December of that year. On November 6, 2014, Governor Steve Beshear announced that Abramson would step down from his position, to accept the job of Director of Intergovernmental Affairs in the Obama White House. He was succeeded by former State Auditor Crit Luallen. At the conclusion of Obama's second term, Abramson returned to Louisville to serve as executive-in-residence at Bellarmine University. He had previously served in the same post in 2011. He departed Bellarmine in 2018 and is currently serving as executive-in-residence at Spalding University.

== Early life ==
Abramson grew up in the Louisville suburb of Strathmoor Village, Kentucky. Before serving as a mayor of Louisville, he worked at Abramson's Market at 738 South Preston Street in Louisville's Smoketown neighborhood, then owned by his father Roy and founded by his grandparents. He graduated from Seneca High School and served for two years in the Army, but did not see combat.

While a student at Indiana University Bloomington, Abramson became active in politics by volunteering for Robert F. Kennedy's 1968 campaign for president. After graduating from IU, Abramson attended Georgetown University Law School.

Abramson practiced law with Greenebaum Doll & McDonald, PLLC. Before his first run for mayor, Abramson also served as alderman for two terms and as general counsel to governor John Y. Brown Jr.

== Mayor of Louisville ==
In the 1985 general election, Abramson defeated the Republican candidate Bob Heleringer, a conservative member of the Kentucky House of Representatives from 1980 to 2002. Abramson was highly popular as mayor from 1986 to 1999 because of growth in the Louisville economy as the decline in urban population that began in the 1950s slowed greatly. Abramson began the nonprofit civic beautification program Operation Brightside, which included the $700 million expansion of Louisville International Airport. He worked to revitalize the city's waterfront with the creation of Waterfront Park and expanded the local economy by recruiting the international headquarters for Tricon Global Restaurants (now Yum! Brands), the Presbyterian Church (USA) and United Parcel Service Air Hub 2000 (a facility now known as Worldport).

Abramson normally would have left office in 1998. However, his original third term was extended by one year as part of a state-mandated transition to align the dates of local and federal elections.

Subsequent to his first tenure as mayor, Abramson practiced law with the Frost Brown Todd firm and taught at Bellarmine University.

== Mayor of Louisville Metro ==
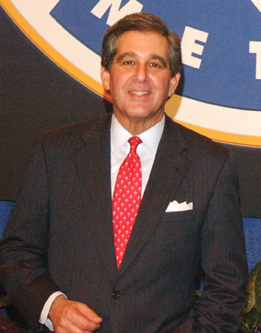
Abramson during his tenure as Mayor

After the merger of Louisville and Jefferson County was approved, the previous term limits no longer applied. Abramson was easily elected the first mayor of Louisville Metro in 2002 by 73.4 percent of the vote over Republican challenger Jack Early, former mayor of Hurstbourne, Kentucky, a major suburb of Louisville.

One of Abramson's first actions as Metro mayor was to appoint Robert C. White Chief of the troubled Louisville Metro Police Department, the first African American to hold the post. The move proved to be politically wise, helping to calm criticism of the department from the black community in Louisville.

Abramson was re-elected mayor in November 2006; his opponents were Republican Metro Council member Kelly Downard and Independent Ed Springston.

Abramson is the first person of Jewish faith to have served as mayor of Louisville. He lives in the Crescent Hill neighborhood with his wife, Madeline.

Kentucky Monthly magazine's readers voted Abramson "Kentucky's Best" civic figure five times (2002–2006).

== Lieutenant governor of Kentucky ==
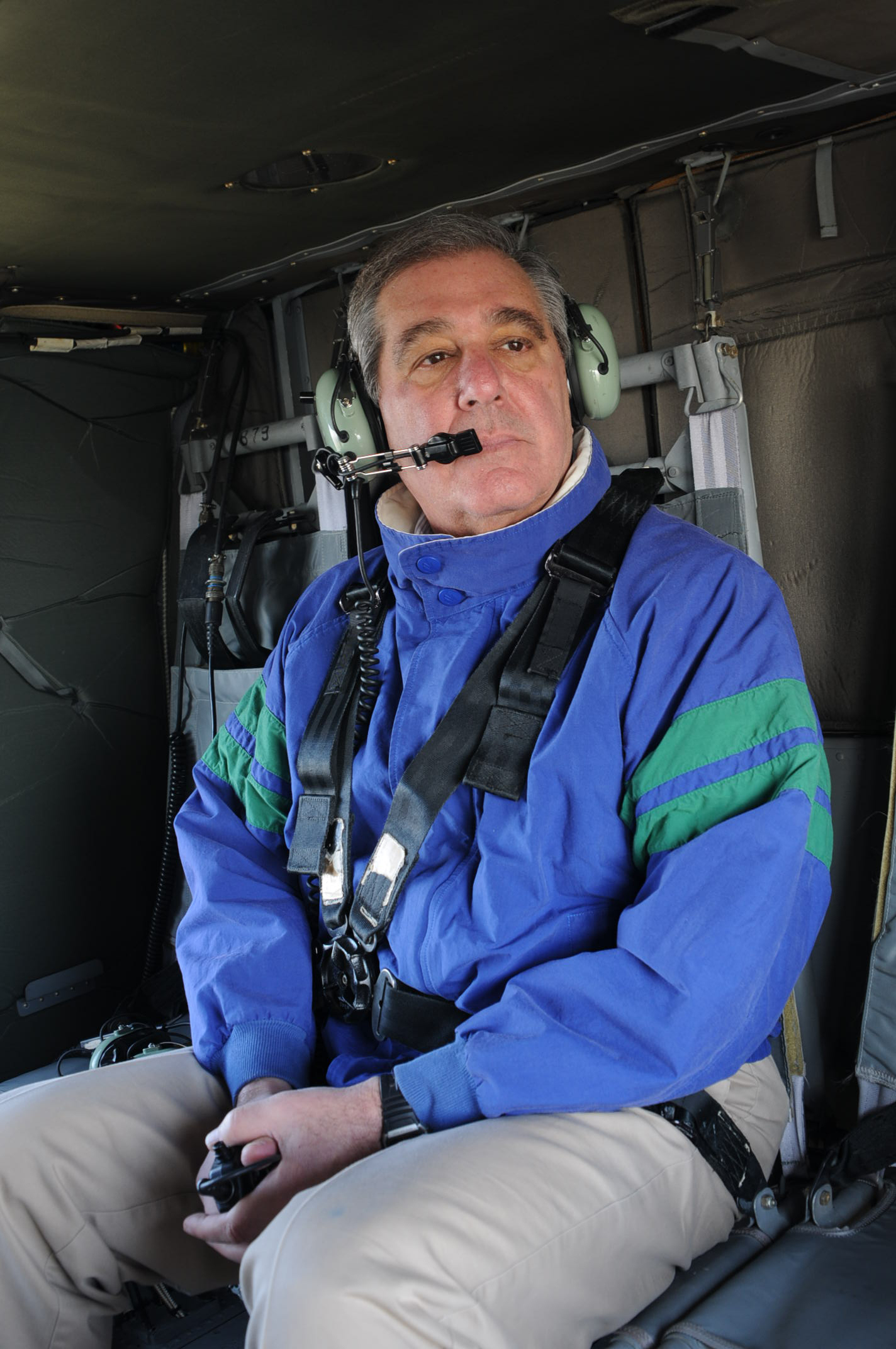
Abramson in 2012

On July 19, 2009, Kentucky Governor Steve Beshear announced that Abramson would step down after his second term as mayor of Louisville Metro to run as lieutenant governor in his re-election campaign in 2011. This came after Dan Mongiardo decided to run for U.S. Senate. Since Abramson's planned departure was announced, many candidates announced they would run to succeed him in 2010. Businessman Greg Fischer won the Democratic nomination and general election to succeed Abramson.

The Beshear-Abramson ticket won in a landslide against Senate President David Williams and his running mate Richie Farmer. Abramson took office as the 55th lieutenant governor of Kentucky on December 13, 2011. His political future had been a subject of considerable speculation, but in an August 2013 speech before the Elizabethtown Rotary Club, he announced that he would not run for governor in 2015, saying,

I would like to in the next chapter of my life focus on one thing I really believe will make a significant difference in the development of Kentucky. And that focus is on education.

== Resignation as lieutenant governor and presidential appointment ==
On November 6, 2014, Abramson announced that he had been appointed by President Barack Obama to the position of deputy assistant to the president and White House Director of Intergovernmental Affairs. Abramson also informed Governor Beshear of his intention to resign as lieutenant governor of Kentucky effective November 13, 2014, at 5:00 pm. Gov. Beshear also announced on November 6 his appointment of former State Auditor Crit Luallen to serve out the remainder of Abramson's term.

== Post-government career ==
In early 2017, upon Obama's exit from the White House, Abramson rejoined the faculty of Bellarmine University as its Executive-in-Residence.

In late 2018, Abramson left Bellarmine to join Spalding University in Louisville as its Executive-in-Residence. At Spalding, the university named a lecture series after Abramson in early 2019. "The Abramson Leadership Exchange" was a partnership with Ignite Louisville and Young Professionals Association of Louisville, with the former Mayor chairing the events, the Abramson Leadership Exchange brought the university's Ed.D. students, alumni, and community leaders together for panel discussions on cutting-edge topics related to public affairs, government, media, and business.

On July 29, 2021, Abramson was appointed by Governor Andy Beshear to serve on the University of Louisville board of trustees, replacing Matthew Barzun who vacated that position on August 2, 2021. Abramson's term expires on January 13, 2027.

== See also ==
- Government of Louisville, Kentucky
- Louisville Metro Council
- 2010 Louisville mayoral election

Political offices
Preceded by Harvey Sloane	Mayor of Louisville; 1986–1999	Succeeded by David Armstrong
Preceded by David Armstrong	Mayor of Louisville; 2003–2011	Succeeded by Greg Fischer
Preceded by Daniel Mongiardo	Lieutenant Governor of Kentucky; 2011–2014	Succeeded by Crit Luallen
Preceded by David Agnew	Director of the White House Office of Intergovernmental Affairs; 2014–2017; Served alongside: Valerie Jarrett (Public Engagement and Intergovernmental Affairs)	Succeeded by Justin R. Clark
Party political offices
Preceded by Daniel Mongiardo	Democratic nominee for Lieutenant Governor of Kentucky; 2011	Succeeded by Sannie Overly
