= Louisville Sinking Fund Building =

Historic building in Louisville, Kentucky

Sinking Fund Building
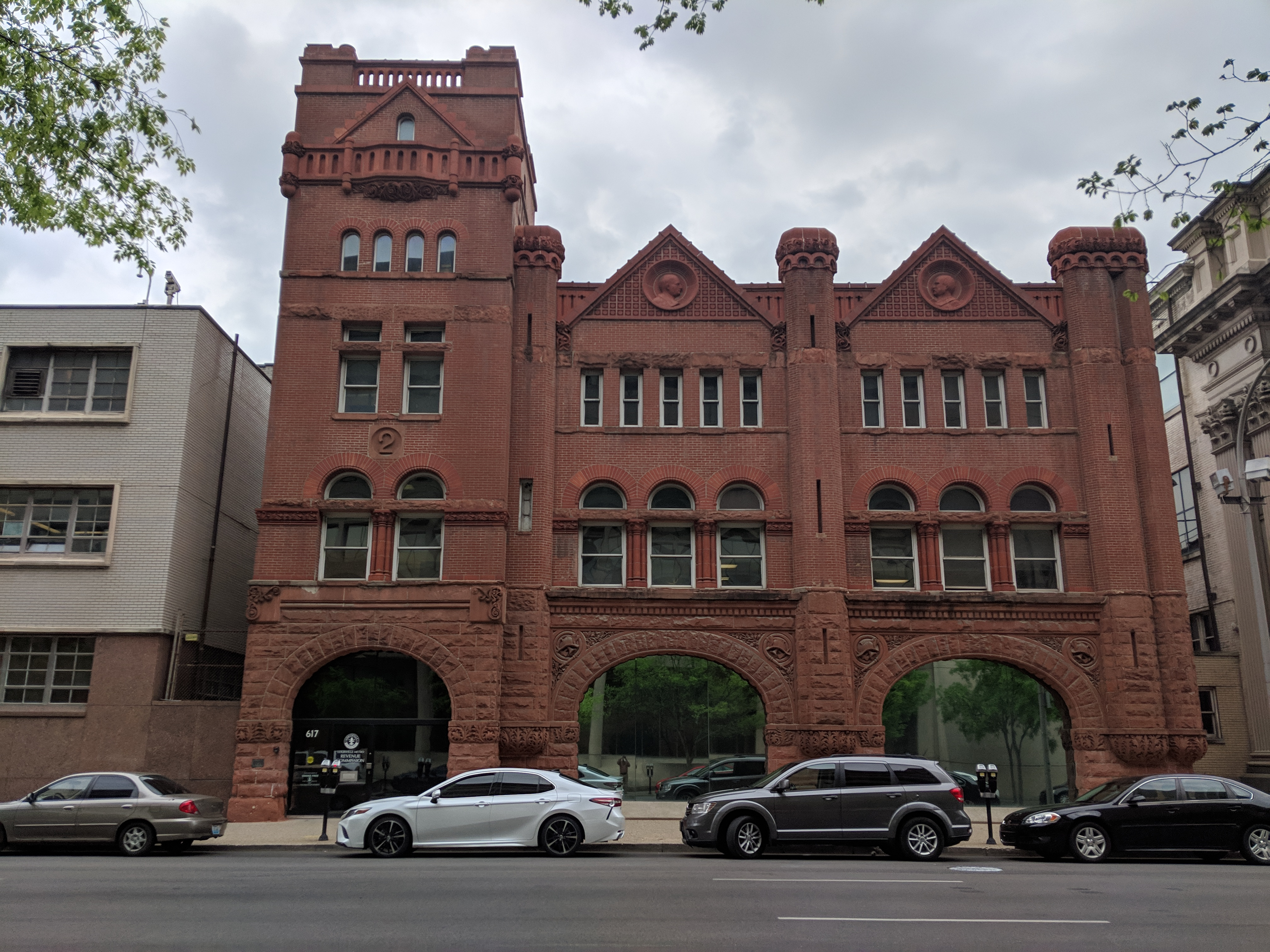
- Interactive map of the Sinking Fund Building area
- Alternative names: Fire Station No. 2 Louisville Metro Office Building

General information
- Location: 617 W. Jefferson St., Louisville, Kentucky, United States
- Coordinates: 38°15′16″N 85°45′41″W
- Completed: 1891
- Renovated: 1937

Height
- Architectural: Richardsonian Romanesque

Technical details
- Material: Red sandstone and bricks
- Floor count: 5

Design and construction
- Architect: McDonald Brothers
- Steam Engine Company No. 2
- U.S. National Register of Historic Places
- Location within Kentucky
- Location: 617–621 W. Jefferson St., Louisville, Kentucky
- Coordinates: 38°15′16″N 85°45′41″W
- Area: less than one acre
- Architect: McDonald Brothers
- Architectural style: Romanesque
- MPS: Historic Firehouses of Louisville TR
- NRHP reference No.: 80001625
- Added to NRHP: November 7, 1980

The Sinking Fund Building, also known as Firehouse No. 2, is an historic building in downtown Louisville, Kentucky. Located on Jefferson Street between Louisville Metro Police Headquarters and the Louisville City Hall Annex building, it is part of the municipal office complex that comprises several neighboring blocks and originally housed the Louisville Division of Fire. The building currently houses the office of the Louisville Metro Revenue Commission, the primary municipal taxing authority for the city-county government. It is listed on the National Register of Historic Places.

== History ==
=== As a fire station ===
The building was designed by the McDonald Brothers architectural firm of Louisville as a fire department headquarters. Constructed in 1891, it was financed by a sinking fund, which led to its subsequent name.

Made of red sandstone and bricks, it was designed in a Richardsonian Romanesque design. The building has a five-story drying tower that originally supported an additional two-story belfry tower. The belfry tower was used as a lookout to survey the surrounding area for signs of fire and housed a fire warning bell. The belfry tower was later removed from the building. The facade of the building features relief sculptures of Benjamin Bache, the fire chief at the time, and Emile Bourlier, who was a bookkeeper for the sinking fund. Three large arches located at the base of the structure once served as doorways for the horse-drawn fire engines housed in the building; the second floor was originally used as offices and sleeping quarters for the firemen.

After the fire department moved out in 1937 to new facilities at 12th and Jefferson, the police traffic department moved in. Funds had been set aside for reconditioning the building to house the police headquarters, but they were diverted to reconstruction work after the Ohio River flooded that year. The patrol division joined the traffic bureau in 1943.

=== Becoming the Sinking Fund Building ===
By the mid-1950s, the police department had moved next door to a new building. In 1957, the name "Sinking Fund Building" was used for the first time when a $97,000 renovation package gave the Commissioners of the Sinking Fund additional space on the first floor; the upper floors, used by the Welfare Department, received air conditioning as part of the remodel. The Commissioners of the Sinking Fund, an agency originally chartered by the Kentucky General Assembly in 1852, was the predecessor agency of the Louisville Metro Revenue Commission. The Sinking Fund Building has housed the city's tax collectors at multiple times in its history. It was also used to house equipment for a study of downtown air pollution in the mid-1960s.

In 1969, a consultant working with the city recommended the building be torn down to make war for a modern civic complex; the proposed $23.4 million governmental complex went to Jefferson County voters in November 1970 but was defeated by 15,000 votes. In 1980, the building was placed on the National Register of Historic Places, four years after the adjacent City Hall had also been placed on the NRHP. The Louisville Department of Building and Housing Inspection moved from City Hall to the Sinking Fund Building in 1975; the building was remodeled to accommodate the city department, including the installation of an elevator. The renovation, which continued into the late 1970s, also included restoration work, such as the uncovering of the names of Bache and Bourlier on the front entrance.

Citing a lack of space, the Commissioners of the Sinking Fund moved out of the Sinking Fund Building in 1992 to offices on West Main Street, where the agency was able to consolidate its archives from the Sinking Fund Building and City Hall; the agency was renamed the Louisville Metro Revenue Commission following a city-county merger in 2003. In 2004, all other agencies moved out of the Sinking Fund Building and the Revenue Commission reoccupied the space.

== See also ==
- Historic Firehouses of Louisville
- Steam Engine Company No. 7
- National Register of Historic Places listings in Downtown Louisville, Kentucky

== Sources ==
- Kleber, John E., ed. (2015). The Encyclopedia of Louisville. University Press of Kentucky. ISBN 9780813149745.
- Luhan, Gregory; Domer, Dennis; Mohoney, David (2004). The Louisville Guide. Princeton Architectural Press. ISBN 9781568984513.
