= Louisville Metro Police Department =

- Common name: Metro or Metro Police
- Abbreviation: LMPD

Agency overview
- Formed: 2003
- Preceding agencies: Louisville Division of Police; Jefferson County Police Department; (simultaneous until merger)
- Employees: 1,350 (2022)
- Annual budget: $190 million (2020)

Jurisdictional structure
- Operations jurisdiction: Louisville-Jefferson Co Metro, Kentucky, USA
- Map of Louisville Metro Police Department's jurisdiction
- Area: 399 square miles (1,030 km^{2})
- Population: 620,149 (2018)
- General nature: Local civilian police

Operational structure
- Headquarters: Louisville, Kentucky
- Sworn Officers: 1,039 (2022)
- Agency executive: Paul Humphrey, Chief of Police
- Divisions: 8

Facilities
- Divisions: 8
- Helicopters: 3
- Horses: 4

Website
- louisville-police.org

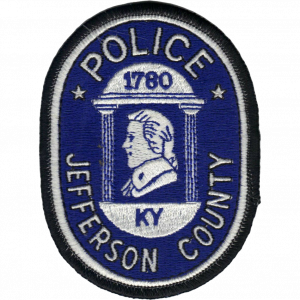
Jefferson County Police Patch

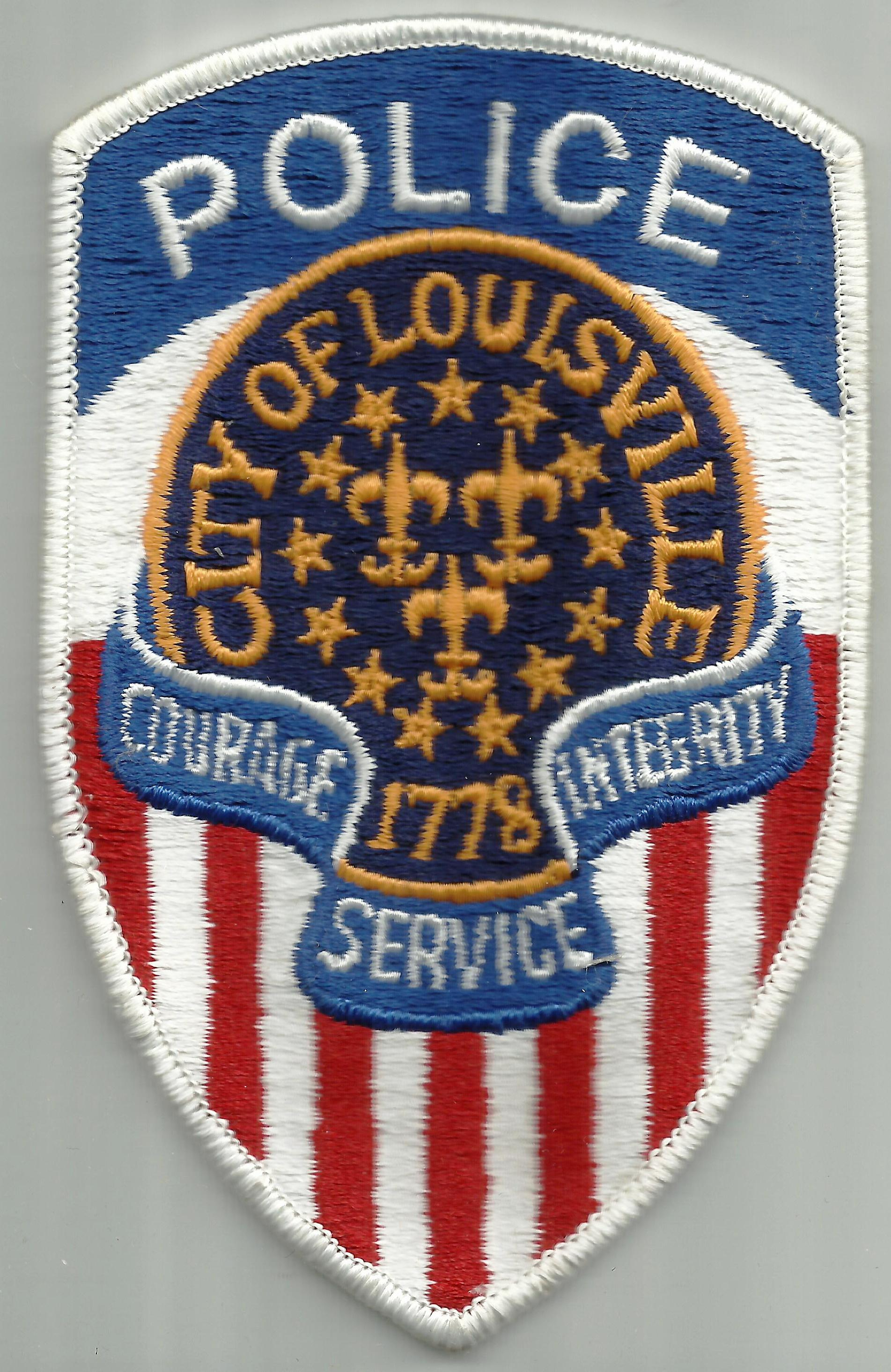
City of Louisville police old patch, 2012

The Louisville Metro Police Department (LMPD) began operations on January 6, 2003, as part of the creation of the consolidated city-county government in Louisville, Kentucky, United States. It was formed by the merger of the Jefferson County Police Department and the Louisville Division of Police.

The Louisville Metro Police Department was most recently headed by Jacquelyn Gwinn-Villaroel since January 2, 2023. On Tuesday June 25, 2024, Chief Gwinn-Villaroel resigned following an ongoing sexual harassment and abuse scandal among the Louisville Metro Police Department. Major Paul Humphrey was appointed Interim Chief by Mayor Craig Greenberg. On September 27, 2024; Interim Chief Paul Humphrey was sworn in as Chief of Police for LMPD by Greenberg.

LMPD divides Jefferson County into eight patrol divisions and operates a number of special investigative and support units. The LMPD is currently negotiating a consent decree with the United States Department of Justice (DOJ) subsequent to a 2023 investigation by the DOJ that concluded that the LMPD engaged in a decades long pattern of civil rights abuses.

== History ==
While the Louisville Metro Police Department began in 2003, its origins lie in two police departments dating back to the 1800s, the Jefferson County Police Department (JCPD) and the Louisville Division of Police (LPD).

=== Louisville Police Department ===
The Louisville Police Department, also known as the Louisville Division of Police, came into existence in 1806 with the appointment of five "watchmen" by the town's trustees. In 1821, a captain of the watch was appointed, directly responsible for crime prevention and the apprehension of criminals. The first Sergeant was hired in that year, whose primary duty was to see that the trustees' wishes were carried out.

In 1830, after the city government switched to a mayor-council arrangement, the position of captain was replaced by an elected "Marshall". In 1851, the mayor was put directly over the police. In 1856, a mayor-appointed office of Chief of Police was created, a position that earned $2,000 a year. The next year, the police force was reorganized in the image of modern police departments in the East, with the watchmen being called "policemen".

Following the Civil War, the Kentucky General Assembly passed an act to reorganize the department. The police department was given county-wide jurisdiction. Unfortunately, there was much corruption, as the police department was appointed by the city council. Thus the makeup of the police department depended heavily on the political affiliations of the council members.

Divisions and districting came into use shortly thereafter, with two divisions and several districts (the number depended on the time of day) being established.

In 1891, the department first purchased bicycles to serve with mounted police. The practice of using bicycles would wane throughout the 20th century, but would see a revival in 1993 as they served as an effective alternative to motor vehicles. Three Cadillacs were purchased in November 1908 to address the problem of lawbreakers making getaways in the "horseless carriages". In 1932, the Louisville Police Department began using radios for dispatching units, only the fifth department in the nation to dispatch cars in this manner. Motorcycles were introduced shortly after the cars, but were discontinued in 1984 due to high maintenance costs.

Politics were part of the police department until 1929, when the state's Civil Service act prohibited discrimination on the basis of politics or religion. A Civil Service Board was established, consisting of three members of each political party with the mayor serving as a tiebreaker.

On May 20, 1921, Alice Dunlop became the first female officer in the Louisville Police Department, with Bertha Whedbee becoming the first African American to be a police officer in Louisville. While technically equal with their male counterparts, females were only employed in limited capacities. In 1938, the four policewomen of the Louisville Police Department were dismissed because it was thought that there were no duties which required a woman. A policewoman would next be appointed in 1943, with nine more being appointed in as many years. In 1969, Urania "Kitty" Laun became the department's first sergeant and later appointed lieutenant and the first female district commander.

Decentralization of the department began in 1974. Traffic and detective bureaus remained in the Headquarters Building at Seventh and Jefferson, while other units were placed at various districts.

In 1982, the Louisville Board of Aldermen passed an ordinance allowing the mayor to remove the chief of police for specific reasons. The law was later amended to provide the mayor with the ability to both appoint and remove the chief, following the demotion of Chief Richard Dotson by Mayor Jerry Abramson in 1990.

On March 2, 2002, Louisville Mayor David L. Armstrong fired Police Chief Gene Sherrard due to a banquet honoring officers for exceptional valor. Two officers being honored for facing immediate danger were controversial as to what constituted immediate danger to these officers. The suspect in the case of these two officers, Desmond Rudolph, had left the house the officers went to through the back door and went to a stolen vehicle. Rudolph, who was unarmed, attempted to drive off, but there are conflicting statements as to if the car was operable or not. The view of the policemen involved was that the car was operable and, believing they may be struck by the vehicle, constituted a danger to their lives, while the opposing view is that the policemen did not follow proper police procedure by failing to secure the rear exit and that the car was inoperable and did not pose any danger to the officers. Rudolph was shot by the two officers 22 times and Rudolph died from his wounds. After the firing of the chief of police, many Louisville policemen marched in front of Louisville City Hall to protest the firing of Sherrard and demanded the resignation of Mayor Armstrong.

In 2003 Robert C. White was appointed by Jerry Abramson as the first African-American chief of police in Louisville.

In 2019 LMPD concealed hundreds of thousands of records relating to child sexual abuse by its officers. In response to an inquiry by The Courier-Journal the department said it no longer held any records, when it fact it held at least 738,000 records which were later deleted.

The U. S. Department of Justice on April 26, 2021, issued a press release, which stated:

Attorney General Merrick B. Garland announced today that the Department of Justice has opened a pattern or practice investigation into the Louisville/Jefferson County Metro Government (Louisville Metro) and the Louisville Metro Police Department (LMPD). The investigation will assess all types of force used by LMPD officers, including use of force on individuals with behavioral health disabilities or individuals engaged in activities protected by the First Amendment. The investigation will assess whether LMPD engages in discriminatory policing, and also whether it conducts unreasonable stops, searches, seizures, and arrests, both during patrol activities and in obtaining and executing search warrants for private homes. The investigation will include a comprehensive review of LMPD policies, training, and supervision, as well as LMPD's systems of accountability, including misconduct complaint intake, investigation, review, disposition, and discipline...

=== Jefferson County Police Department ===
The Jefferson County Police Department was established in February 1868. In 1902, police officers providing their own horses were compensated an extra $10 each month. Two years later, this practice ceased with a wage increase from $40 to $60 monthly for officers. The first chief of police to be granted use of a county car was Harry Kendall in 1918. Following a letter from Chief Ambrose Hagerman noting that there were no river deaths in 1932 due to the introduction of rowboats, the county approved the purchase of a motorboat.

Jefferson County's Special Weapons and Tactics (SWAT) team was formed in 1971. In 1981, JCPD received authorization from the Kentucky Law Enforcement Council to conduct annual in-service training. In 1999, it became certified to conduct its own police academy. At the time of merger, JCPD was divided into four patrol districts: Adam, Baker, Charlie and David.

=== Merger ===
During the 1990s, certain specialized elements of the county and city police departments began joint operations. Most notable were the photo and fingerprint labs, the narcotics bureaus and the crimes against children departments. The purpose of this merger was to provide more efficient and cost-effective service.

JCPD and LPD ceased to exist as separate entities on January 6, 2003, when the Louisville Metro Police Department became effective as part of the city-county merger.

=== Police reform measures ===
On June 10, 2020, the Louisville city council voted unanimously to ban no-knock search warrants. The law is called Breonna's Law, in honor of Breonna Taylor who was killed by police during the execution of a no-knock search warrant. (The detectives were granted the no knock exception but the officers executing the search warrant chose not to use it.) The new law requires all officers who serve warrants to wear body cameras and have them turned on from at least five minutes before the warrant is served to at least five minutes after it is served.

On June 18, 2020, Louisville Metro Police Department policy was changed so that all officers will have a new duty to intervene when they see misconduct from their fellow officers. The new standard operating procedure says that officers should act to prevent other officers, "regardless of rank or assignment, from using unlawful or excessive force".

In April 2021, the United States Department of Justice announced a wide-ranging investigation of the LMPD. The investigation will examine patterns of abuse, including excessive force, unconstitutional stops, searches and seizures, and whether officers discriminate on the basis of race.

The Justice Department said on March 8, 2023, that there was "reasonable cause to believe" that the Louisville Metro Police Department broke people's civil rights. This was the result of an investigation that started after Breonna Taylor's death.

=== Controversies ===
The Louisville Metro Police Department has had officers accused of misconduct, fired, and other officers have been arrested. Below are some of those incidents. This is not an all inclusive list.

- While the Louisville riots of 1968 had many causes (most directly, the spread of false rumors and bottles being thrown into the crowd) the crowd where the riot began had gathered to protest the possible reinstatement of a white officer who had been suspended for beating a black man some weeks earlier. As the crowd became unruly, police attempts to disperse it were ineffective, but this was a common problem police departments of the day had.
- In 1982, Michael VonAllmen was arrested and charged with rape and related crimes. After serving eleven years in prison for the crime, he was released on parole. In 2010, courts overruled the conviction. In 2011, VanAllman sued the police department over the case, claiming misconduct had led to his false conviction.
- One of the first and most widely covered controversies faced by the post-merger department was the shooting of Michael Newby on January 3, 2004, in the predominantly black Shawnee neighborhood. Newby, a 19-year-old black male in possession of drugs and a firearm, was shot by McKenzie Mattingly, a white police officer, in what authorities described as an undercover drug deal gone bad. After they struggled and Newby went for Mattingly's gun, Mattingly fired four times, hitting Newby three times in the back, killing him. An internal police investigation found that Mattingly did not face an "immediate threat", although Newby did have a .45-caliber gun in his waistband. Mattingly was fired from the department and charged criminally, but acquitted of all charges in September 2004. The nature of the incident and trial sparked a number of protests and demonstrations by members of the community. The city eventually paid $250,000 to Newby's mother to settle a lawsuit.
- On November 6, 2006, the President of the LMPD officers' Fraternal Order of Police Lodge criticized the mayor of Louisville in a 30-second video for his not providing adequate resources to LMPD. In the video, he also endorsed Mayor Abramson's Republican opponent in the 2006 mayoral election. The video implied that the mayor was causing officers to use an outdated and ineffective radio communications system and that he had not hired enough police officers to ensure public safety.
- In August 2011, Officer Jerry Lee Coulter pleaded guilty to bankruptcy fraud. He had altered official documents to indicate he could borrow a larger amount than authorized by the court.
- In September 2011, the department launched an investigation when a video clip posted on YouTube showed Officer James W. Conley beating a man with a flashlight. In March 2012, a local grand jury refused to indict Officer Conley.
- On December 17, 2011, Officer Charles Wheeler saw his girlfriend sit with another man at a local club. He ordered the other man to move and when he refused Wheeler began to beat him. In October 2012, he was charged with fourth-degree assault.
- In early September 2012, narcotics Detective Chauncey Carthan got into an altercation at the corner of 24th and Chestnut Streets with an unarmed man. Carthan shot the man in the leg when he refused to get out of his car. Carthan was off-duty and under the influence of alcohol at the time of the shooting. Carthan was charged with driving under the influence, wanton endangerment, and official misconduct. On January 15, 2015, Carthan was acquitted on charges of wanton endangerment, but found guilty of driving under the influence; he was ordered to pay a $500 fine. The official misconduct charge was dismissed prior to trial.
- In January 2012, Donald Blake Settle, who served as a lieutenant colonel in the Kentucky Army National Guard at Fort Knox, was restrained by LMPD officers who thought he was a homeless panhandler; Settle has since filed a lawsuit against the department alleging assault and wrongful detainment. The suit was subsequently settled for 50,000 in 2015.
- In March 2014, a mob of teenagers began a series of attacks in downtown Louisville. Among twenty-plus incidents, a man was knocked down and beaten near the Big Four Bridge, and a large group ransacked a convenience store on South First Street. Although LMPD had deployed extra officers due to the potential for trouble after the death of a juvenile stabbed on a TARC bus several days earlier, the officers were based along West Broadway, away from where the mob attack took place. In the days following the mob incident, residents criticized LMPD for their response. The Downtown Area Patrol was established as a result of the attack and outcry, and led the Louisville and Jeffersonville, Indiana police departments to develop strategies to combat issues at the Big Four Bridge, which connects the two cities via a walking path. The man who stabbed the juvenile was cleared of wrongdoing on self-defense grounds.
- In 2019, former officer Pablo Cano was sentenced to 5 years in prison for sexual misconduct on 5 women.
- In 2020, Breonna Taylor was shot and killed by police. On May 21, 2020, Louisville Police Chief Steve Conrad announced that he plans to retire effective June 30.
- In 2020, business owner David McAtee was shot and killed by the Kentucky Army National Guard and police. On June 1, 2020, Louisville Mayor Greg Fischer announced the immediate firing of Police Chief Steve Conrad. The FBI and U.S. Attorney's Office were also brought in to investigate McAtee's death.
- In November 2020 it was revealed that the LMPD have covered up 738,000 documents relating to sexual abuse against minors perpetrated by two officers.
- Former Detective Mark Handy perjured himself and put at least 4 men in prison for various lengths of time. In one case, subsequent appeals courts held that the suspect Former Detective Handy helped to convict was innocent. In another case, Handy perjured himself and tampered with evidence to secure a conviction. Multiple lawsuits have been brought against agencies that employed Handy, including Louisville Metro Police and Louisville Metro Government. These have often led to multi-million dollar settlements and the justice system being subverted in other ways. Namely the actual offender has gotten away with the underlying crime. In 2021, Judge Olu Stevens presided over a criminal case filed against Handy where a special prosecutor recommended probation for one count of perjury. After community outcry, the judge declined this offer and Handy withdrew his plea. In a subsequent plea, he was sentenced to one year in prison with an agreement to not seek probation. After 2 weeks in physical custody, he was released.

== DOJ investigation ==
In 2023, the United States Department of Justice announced its findings of the Louisville Metro Police. The report found LMPD used "excessive force" and "an aggressive style of policing" against Black people. The investigation found that the "police often cite people for minor offenses, while cases like sexual assault and homicide go unsolved". It also found that some officers filmed themselves throwing trash at pedestrians; insulted people with disabilities; and referred to black people as "monkeys" and "animals".

== Equipment ==
The Louisville Metro Police Department uses a wide variety of equipment for their sworn staff.

Uniforms are labeled from Class A all the way to Class E, each with their own use. The Class A uniform is the standard uniform that can be worn by all officers, on-duty or working secondary employment. The Class A uniform is the typical police uniform consisting of blue garments with a necktie tucked into the shirt, leather duty belt and accessories, along with a metal nameplate with the members first initial and last name with "SERVING SINCE [year]" below the name, metal badge, and two "METRO" collar pins. This uniform has an under shirt ballistic vest.

The Class B and C uniforms are tactical patrol uniforms consisting of an outer plate carrier with reflective "POLICE" patches affixed to the front and back, a nylon duty belt, hard plastic accessories, a reflective name strip attached to the right upper breast area, and a rubber or PVC type material badge affixed on the left upper breast area. If an officer is in a situation where having their name would pose a member safety issue, members are allowed to have a reflective name strip with their 4-digit MetroSafe code number in lieu of their name.

LMPD SOP allows all sworn members to purchase alternate ballistic panel carriers at their expense. Those carriers are the Point-Blank Tailored Armor Carrier (TAC) in midnight blue that may be worn with the Class B or Class C uniform; and the Point-Blank Outer Duty Carrier Laser Cut (ODC) in black that may be worn with both the Class B and Class C uniform.

LMPD SOP allows duty equipment to be mounted onto the ODC. The equipment that is approved for external mounting are:

- Departmentally approved Oleoresin Capsicum (OC) spray
- Radio
- Flashlight
- Expandable baton holster
- Tourniquet
- Latex or nitrile gloves pouch
- Body-Worn Camera (BWC) pouch
- Handcuff pouch
- Conducted Electrical Weapon (CEW or Taser) attached in a cross-draw manner.
- 1 rifle magazine pouch in black.

LMPD does not authorized members to wear handgun magazine pouches on their ODC.

LMPD utilizes two different colors for non-commanding members and commanding officers. Non-commanding officers will utilize silver badges, reflective name tapes, and "POLICE" reflective patches. Commanding officers will utilize gold badges, reflective name tapes, and "POLICE" reflective patches.

LMPD issues their sworn staff departmentally approved firearms. The firearms for uniformed members are the:

- Glock 17
- Glock 17 MOS
- Glock 47
- Glock 47 MOS

For plainclothes or detective members, they are issued the:

- Glock 48
- Glock 48 MOS

Effective June 15, 2023, LMPD no longer issues shotguns to members. Members are instead authorized to use personally owned shotguns given that they meet criteria. Shotguns are to be Remington model 870's with a black or stainless-steel finish, with stocks, foregrips, or other accessories being in either black or a woodgrain finish.

Effective June 15, 2023, LMPD issues AR-15 style rifles to officers. Officers will be issued the FN 15 Small Rifle Platform Generation Two Precision Carbine in either the 16 inch or 11.5-inch barrel configuration. All departmental rifles will be modified by the Firearms Training Center and equipped with the following attachments:

- Aimpoint Red Dot Sight
- Streamlight Rail Mounted Series Two WML
- Fabrique Nationale backup iron sights
- 2-point sling
- Dust cover
- Forward assist
- Two rifle magazines

Members who are a part of the Bomb Squad, Criminal Interdiction Division - Violent Crime Unit and Fugitive Unit, Homeland Security Unit, and the Canine Unit will all be issued the 11.5-inch variant of the rifle. All other members will be issued the 16-inch variant.

For service pistols, LMPD authorizes three different weapon-mounted lights.

- Streamlight TLR-1/HL
- Streamlight TLR-7A
- Surefire X300 (all variants)

For communications, LMPD utilizes the Motorola APX series radios.

LMPD utilizes the Axon ecosystem. Members of LMPD are equipped with the Axon Signal Sidearm Activator on all duty holsters. Furthermore, LMPD uses the Taser 7 that is programmed to activate the body cameras of all members within a certain vicinity when the Taser is armed. LMPD uses the Axon Body 3 and is in the process of moving to the Axon Body 4.

== Organizational structure ==
The chief of police is appointed by the Mayor of Louisville Metro, and reports directly to the Mayor. The Chief of Police is empowered as the highest authority in the department, and as per the Louisville Metro Ordinance 36.02, the Chief of Police has the ultimate control over all aspects of departmental operations, as well as command authority over divisions, units, squads, and other components of the department. Furthermore, the Chief of Police is responsible for all fiscal matters regarding the department.

The Chief of Police then directly supervises seven different personnel, as stated in LMPD SOP 1.4.1:

- Deputy Chief of Police/Chief of Operations (sworn, rank of Colonel)
- Deputy Chief of Police/Chief of Staff (sworn, rank of Colonel)
- Legal Advisor (civilian professional staff)
- Media and Public Relations (sworn commander, rank of Sergeant. Civilian professional staff as well.)
- Police Activities League (sworn members)
- Special Investigations Division or SID (sworn, rank of Major)
- Professional Standards Division or PSD (sworn, rank of Major)

The Deputy Chief of Police/Chief of Operations holds the rank of Colonel and is appointed by the Mayor, upon the recommendation of the Chief of Police, and reports directly to the Chief of Police. The Deputy Chief of Police/Chief of Operations coordinates and supervises activities within the Patrol Bureau and the Support Bureau.

The Deputy Chief of Police/Chief of Operations then has an Assistant Chief of Police for the Patrol Bureau, who holds the rank of Lieutenant Colonel, and oversees and coordinates the Patrol Divisions, Non-Fatal Shooting Unit, and Night Commanders, and oversees all 8 division Majors within the Patrol Bureau.

The Deputy Chief of Police/Chief of Staff holds the rank of Colonel and is appointed by the Mayor, upon the recommendation of the Chief of Police, and reports directly to the Chief of Police. The Deputy Chief of Police/Chief of Staff oversees and supervises the Administrative Bureau and the Accountability and Improvement Bureau (AIB).

The Deputy Chief of Police/Chief of Staff then has an Assistant Chief of Police for the Support Bureau, who holds the rank of Lieutenant Colonel, and oversees and coordinates the Major Crimes Division, Special Operations Division, and the Homeland Security Unit. With the MCD, SOD being headed by a Major, and the HSU being headed by a Lieutenant.

The Deputy Chief of Police/Chief of Staff also has another Assistant Chief of Police for the Administrative Bureau who holds the rank of Lieutenant Colonel, and is appointed by the Mayor upon recommendation by the Chief of Police. The Assistant Chief of Police/Administrative Bureau supervises and coordinates Police Human Resources, Administrative Services Division, and Executive Administrator of LMPD Budget.

The VIPER unit was officially disbanded around August 28, 2015; and was rebranded as the 9th Mobile Division due to controversies surrounding the unit, mainly regarding leadership within the unit.

=== Patrol and interdepartmental issues ===
Before the merger of the city and county police departments, there were six "city" districts (patrolled by LPD) and four "county" districts (patrolled by JCPD). The city districts were identified numerically, while the county districts were labeled using a phonetic alphabet: Adam, Baker, Charlie, David. On October 10, 2004, Jefferson County was divided into eight patrol divisions, each headed by an officer holding the rank of major. The first, second, fourth and fifth divisions roughly comprise the former jurisdiction of the city police department, while the third, sixth, seventh and eighth divisions make up the area formerly patrolled by the county police department. It is common for longtime police officers to refer to a division by the name that area held before merger (e.g., the old fourth district), just as they will sometimes refer to a police officer as being "county" or "city" if they served before merger.

Even after the city-county merger became effective in 2003, Louisville Metro Police did not become the sole law enforcement agency in the county. Other than the Jefferson County Sheriff's Office (JCSO), the incorporated cities remaining intact after merger maintain their own police with jurisdiction within those cities. Most notable of these are the Jeffersontown, Shively and St. Matthews Police Departments. LMPD patrol units do not typically respond to calls for service inside these departments' jurisdictions, and vice versa. Certain LMPD divisions and specialized units provide assistance to these police agencies when necessary.

=== Communications ===
Louisville Metro Police communicates using radios on both VHF and UHF frequencies, a carryover from the communications systems of LPD and JCPD. A recent citywide initiative in coordinated operations is MetroSafe, which has combined the radio dispatch capabilities of police, fire and EMS into one joint emergency management unit (Joint EMU). Additionally, MetroSafe has incorporated a Motorola MotoBridge into the system, facilitating communications between different agencies (such as Shively and Jeffersontown Police Departments) with different communications capabilities.

The radio alphabet in use in LMPD is the same one used by the American Radio Relay League, circa 1948, consisting mostly of first names (note: the ARRL currently endorses use of the NATO phonetic alphabet). The alphabet is as follows: Adam, Baker, Charlie, David, Edward, Frank, George, Henry, Ida, John, King, Lincoln, Mary, Nora, Ocean, Paul, Queen, Robert, Sam, Tom, Union, Victor, William, X-ray, Young, Zebra.

According to the revised LMPD SOP 3.8.6, the departmentally approved 10-Codes are:

- 10-12 Are You Alone?
- 10-30 Member in Trouble (Needs Help)
- 10-85 Wanted Person
- 10-86 Situation Under Control
- 10-98 Requesting Backup Unit, Code 1

There are 10-Codes that are still used in daily communications that are not approved by SOP. Some of those include:

- 10-7 Out of service
- 10-8 In service
- 10-20 Location
- 10-15 Detainee or arrestee
- 10-23 Arrived on scene or in area
- 10-42 Meet / contact reporting person(s)
- 10-49 Non-injury motor vehicle collision
- 10-50 Motor vehicle collision with injury / injuries (Code 3 response)
- 10-80 death or deceased body

Additionally, there are several terms used by both officers and MetroSafe operators that are specific to Louisville. Some of those terms include:

- "I'm okay" or "Radio's okay", used similar to 10-4; both MetroSafe operators and officers use this term.
- "The Book" means the Louisville Metro Department of Corrections jail facility.
- "CIT" means Crisis Intervention Team.
- "ATL" means Attempt to Locate
- "Route" (used in "set a route to ___") means to block off intersections so that an emergency vehicle (EMS, police, fire, etc.) can safely proceed through intersections with minimal resistance to a location.
- "Run" means a call for service.

LMPD radio procedures are structured as [caller to receiver]. When calling for dispatch, LMPD uses the term "Radio". A call to dispatch would be [callsign, Radio.] MetroSafe operators, when acknowledging the calling unit, will typically repeat the callsign to signal that they are ready for the transmission. An example would be:

- 113-Baker, Radio
- 113-Baker or just "3-Baker"

The same is true in reverse, if a MetroSafe operator is hailing an officer, the transmission would be structured as such:

- Radio, 113-Baker
- 113-Baker or just "3-Baker"

LMPD radio callsigns are based on the division, platoon, beat, and beat unit the officer is assigned. If an officer is working in the 1st division, assigned to the 2nd platoon, in the 4th beat; their radio callsign would be 124. Within that beat, there would be other officers assigned. Those officers would be labeled 124-Adam, 124-Baker, 124-Charlie, so on so forth.

Sergeants who are assigned to a patrol division will use a 3-digit callsign to identify themselves. Their callsigns are based on the division and platoon that they are working.

Command and or administrative staff will typically use either their assigned 4-digit code number (similar to a badge number) or will use another callsign assigned to them by their chain of command or MetroSafe.

The shift commander, who will either be a Major (day shift) or a Lieutenant (night shift) will identify themselves as Car 10.

Officers or detectives working in units such as homicide, robbery, and traffic enforcement; will use a different callsign that is assigned to them via their chain of command and MetroSafe.

Officers who are working an approved secondary employment job, such as providing security for hospitals, grocery stores, etc... are designated "X-ray" and would call over the radio as "X-ray [callsign] Radio"

On March 28, 2022, the Louisville Metro Police Department switched their primary dispatch channels to encrypted transmissions. LMPD provided the following statement:

The Louisville Metro Police Department is committed to a continued partnership with local law enforcement agencies, while at the same time never forgetting our top priority is protecting the community and the officers charged with that responsibility.

On Monday March 28, 2022 at 1000 hours, the LMPD will begin transitioning to an Advanced Encrypted Standard (AES) radio system. The full transition is expected to take a few weeks. Until the transition is completed, starting Monday March 28, 2022 at 1000 hours, LMPD radio transitions will move from Police 1-4 to TAC 1-4. Once the transition is completed, transmissions will move back to Police 1-4 and will be AES encrypted. By the end of April, all LMPD radio communications will be AES encrypted. If your agency does not have AES encrypted radios, communication with LMPD will still be possible through a patched ADP-AES mutual-aid channel. This also means communications between officers and dispatchers will no longer be streamed live to the public through police scanners and websites. Instead, the radio traffic will be streamed for free with a 15-minute delay via Broadcastify. Numerous other public safety agencies across Kentucky, and across the country, are already using encrypted radios. This switch is being made for many reasons including:

- To protect the community and the personal information of victims, suspects, witnesses, and juveniles.
- To protect tactical and investigative integrity.
- To enhance officer safety and prevent suspects from gaining a tactical advantage by listening to live incidents and investigations.

As of June 28, 2024, all LMPD dispatch channels are being provided with a 15-minute delay through third party sites and apps like Broadcastify.

== See also ==
- Killing of Breonna Taylor
- List of law enforcement agencies in Kentucky
- Louisville Division of Fire
- Louisville Metro EMS
