= Valley Station, Louisville =

Neighborhood of Louisville, Kentucky, United States

Valley Station, Kentucky is a former census-designated place in southwestern Jefferson County, Kentucky, United States. The population was 22,946 at the 2000 census. When the government of Jefferson County merged with the city of Louisville, Kentucky in 2003, residents of Valley Station also became citizens of Louisville Metro. As a result, Valley Station is said to be a neighborhood within the city limits of Louisville by local media. It was named for its location in the valley between Muldraugh Hill and the Knobs.

The area was first settled in the mid-nineteenth century. The Salt River Turnpike, today's Dixie Highway, ran through the area. Large-scale suburban development occurred in the 1950s and 1960s, similar to nearby Pleasure Ridge Park. Valley High School is located in the area.

Valley Station is home to Riverside, The Farnsley–Moremen Landing and the Levee Trail.

== Geography ==
Valley Station is located at 38°06′40″N 85°52′13″W.

According to the United States Census Bureau, the CDP has a total area of 20.2 km^{2} (7.8 sq mi), all land.

== Demographics ==
Historical population
Census	Pop.	Note	%±
1960	10,553		—
1970	24,471		131.9%
1980	24,474		0.0%
1990	22,840		−6.7%
2000	23,055		0.9%
2010	23,489		1.9%

As of the census of 2000, there were 22,946 people, 8,723 households, and 6,568 families residing in the CDP. The population density was 1,134.4 people/km^{2} (2,938 people/mi^{2}). There were 8,948 housing units at an average density of 442.4 units/km^{2} (1,146 units/mi^{2}). The racial makeup of the CDP was 95.66% White, 2.14% African American, 0.24% Native American, 0.40% Asian, 0.03% Pacific Islander, 0.38% from other races, and 1.15% from two or more races. Hispanic or Latino of any race were 0.89% of the population.

There were 8,723 households, out of which 33.3% had children under the age of 18 living with them, 57.9% were married couples living together, 13.5% had a female householder with no husband present, and 24.7% were non-families. 21.0% of all households were made up of individuals, and 10.4% had someone living alone who was 65 years of age or older. The average household size was 2.63 and the average family size was 3.02.

In the CDP, the population was spread out, with 25.3% under the age of 18, 8.8% from 18 to 24, 29.2% from 25 to 44, 21.9% from 45 to 64, and 14.9% who were 65 years of age or older. The median age was 37 years. For every 100 females, there were 92.3 males. For every 100 females age 18 and over, there were 88.6 males.

The median income for a household in the CDP was $42,290, and the median income for a family was $47,650. Males had a median income of $34,763 versus $23,731 for females. The per capita income for the CDP was $18,759. About 4.0% of families and 6.3% of the population were below the poverty line, including 8.1% of those under age 18 and 5.4% of those age 65 or over. 9.6% have a bachelor's degree or higher, 22.6% don't have a high school degree.
