= Steam Engine Company No. 7 =

- U.S. National Register of Historic Places
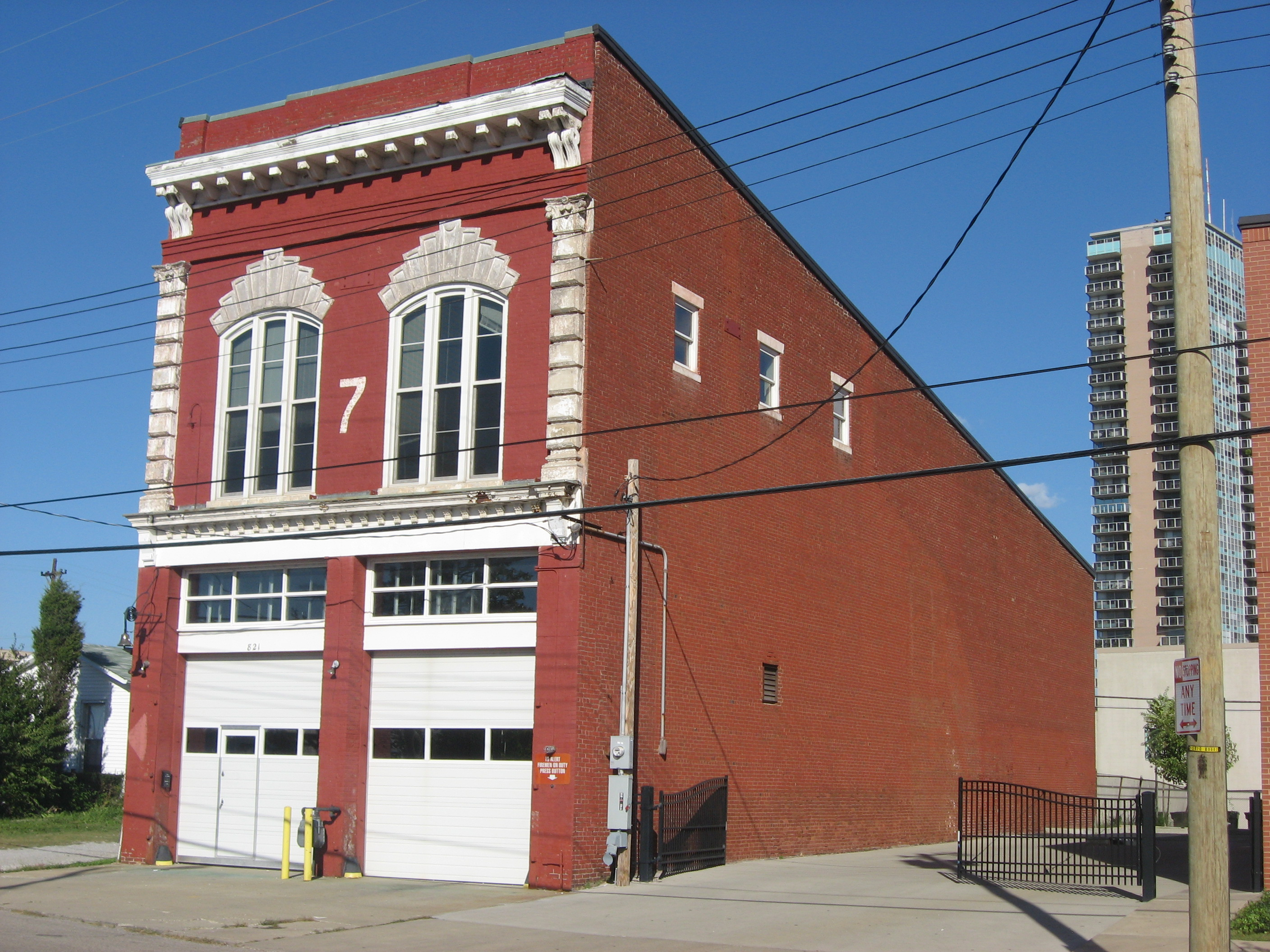
- The firehouse in 2012

- Location within the United States Location within Kentucky
- Location: 821 S. 6th Street; Louisville, Kentucky
- Coordinates: 38°14′38″N 85°45′43″W
- Built: 1871
- Built by: Louisville Division of Fire
- Architectural style: Victorian
- MPS: Historic Firehouses of Louisville TR
- NRHP reference No.: 80001631
- Added to NRHP: November 7, 1980

The Steam Engine Company No. 7 building is a historic firehouse located in Louisville, Kentucky, United States. The two-story, brick structure was built in 1871. It is an excellent example of the application of Victorian design principles to a utilitarian public building, and is stylistically related to contemporary buildings in the Limerick neighborhood.

The firehouse was placed on the National Register of Historic Places in 1980 in recognition of its architectural significance.

== See also ==
- Historic Firehouses of Louisville
- Louisville Firehouse No. 2
- National Register of Historic Places listings in Old Louisville, Kentucky
