= Bertha Whedbee =

African-American suffragist and police officer

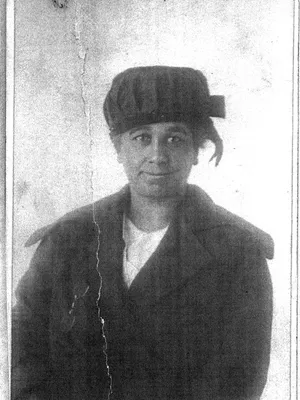
Bertha Whedbee first African American woman to become a police officer in Louisville 1922

Bertha Par Simmons Whedbee (1876 - 1960) was an activist, suffragist, and first African American woman to become a police officer in Louisville, Kentucky.

== Biography ==
Whedbee was born as Bertha Par Simmons in West Virginia in 1879. She later became a kindergarten teacher, graduating from the first class of the Colored Kindergarten Association in 1901. She married a physician, Ellis D. Whedbee, in 1898. They moved to Louisville, Kentucky and had four children together. Whedbee became involved in the women's suffrage movement in Louisville.

In 1919 Bertha Whedbee was inspired to become a police officer herself after local police officers arrested her 17-year-old son, Ellis Jr, as a robbery suspect. Later, the officers charged Ellis with disorderly conduct and a $10 fine. Whedbee didn't believe the charges and confronted the police about the charges, where she was then arrested and charged with a $10 fine as well. Bertha's fine was later suspended, but the fine for her son was upheld. The Whedbees filed a suit against the police station master. On March 3, 1922, she presented a petition that she be appointed a police officer. Whedbee went on to become the first African American woman to work for the Louisville Metro Police Department when she started on March 22, 1922. Her mandate was to work only among other African Americans in the community. She worked on the police force until 1927 when she resigned in protest when the other African American officers were dismissed by a new city administration.

Bertha Whedbee died in 1960. She was buried in Louisville Cemetery. There were no headstones for either Bertha or Ellis Sr. Whedbee until they were installed in 2018.
