= William Althaus =

American politician

23rd Mayor of York, Pennsylvania
- In office 1982–1994
- Preceded by: Betty Marshall
- Succeeded by: Charlie Robertson

50th President of the United States Conference of Mayors
- In office 1992–1993
- Preceded by: Raymond Flynn
- Succeeded by: Jerry Abramson

Personal details
- Party: Republican
- Education: Johns Hopkins University

William J. Althaus is an American former politician who served as mayor of York, Pennsylvania, for 12 years between 1982 and 1994. During this time, he was also selected to be the 50th president of the United States Conference of Mayors for its 1992 to 1993 session. Althaus is a Republican.

Educated at Johns Hopkins University, Althaus majored in political science and history.

== Political career ==
=== Mayor of York ===
As mayor, Althaus sought to turn York into a hub for Soviet and Russian immigrants following the fall of the iron curtain. During his tenure as mayor, Althaus celebrated the 125th anniversary of the occupation of York by the Confederate States of America joking to the Confederate reenactor it wouldn't be as easy this time around due to the York police department which hadn't existed at the time of the occupation. He co-moderated the 86th annual convention of the Pennsylvania League of Cities in 1985. Althaus was also an advocate for smokers rights, seeking to ensure national federal protection for the freedom of individuals to smoke in public. He led a successful effort to have sexual orientation added to a city ordinance protecting against discrimination of public accommodations. During his time as mayor, Althaus served as a delegate to the 1992 Republican National Convention.

=== President of the United States Conference of Mayors ===
Before his appointment as the Conference's president, Althaus had been an active member attending every meeting since his election to mayor of York. When he was chosen as president, besides fostering a working relationship with the Clinton administration, the main goal of his 1992 to 1993 term would be to increase federal funding to cities. During the Bush administration and the Reagan administration federal mandates increased, while the funding for federal mandates was cut. Althaus, and the Conference petitioned to either increase funding so that the mandates may be carried out, or to cut the number of mandates so the funding can cover all of them.

== Post-mayoral career ==
As a former mayor and the last Republican mayor, Althaus has remained an influential member of the local community. He has worked with several other more recent mayors to help with issues such as race relations.

In a 2024 interview with the York Daily Record, Althaus said that after being mayor, he had a 20-year career with the United States Agency for International Development.
