= Pleasure Ridge Park, Louisville =

Neighborhood in Louisville, Kentucky, US

Pleasure Ridge Park (PRP) is a former census-designated place (CDP) in southwest Jefferson County, Kentucky, United States. The population was 26,212 at the 2010 census. In 2003, the area was annexed to the city of Louisville due to a merger between the city and Jefferson County's unincorporated communities. Pleasure Ridge Park is now said to be a neighborhood within the city limits of Louisville by local media.

This community is served by the Pleasure Ridge Park Fire Protection District. The Pleasure Ridge Park Fire Protection District is one of seven volunteer and combination departments that make up the Jefferson County Fire Service. This department covers 62 square miles and serves the citizens of Pleasure Ridge Park, Valley Station, Lake Dreamland and Rubbertown Area in southwestern Jefferson County, Kentucky.

Pleasure Ridge Park High School is located in the area.

== History ==
The area was first sparsely settled by French and German Catholics in the mid-19th century, and the first church, St. Andrew's Church, was built in 1851, and although it no longer exists, a major local road still bears its name. What is now the Paducah and Louisville Railway built a station in the area in 1874, and a summer resort and hotel called Paine Hotel developed around a shaded ridge on Muldraugh Hill, what came to be called Pleasure Ridge. The name Pleasure Ridge Park was chosen for the first post office in the area in 1876. The area continued to be popular for tourism until World War I.

By the 1950s, the area began expanding rapidly as subdivisions were built. People moving to the area liked its cheap land and location reasonably close to both Downtown Louisville and Fort Knox. Residents blocked a 1984 attempt by the nearby city of Shively to annex Pleasure Ridge Park.

In 2002, a team from Pleasure Ridge Park won the Little League World Series.

== Geography ==
Pleasure Ridge Park is located at 38°08′43″N 85°51′30″W. It is in southwest Jefferson County, Kentucky.

According to the United States Census Bureau, the CDP has a total area of 21.5 km^{2} (8.3 sq mi), all land.

== Demographics ==
Historical population
| Census | Pop. | Note | %± |
|---|---|---|---|
| 1960 | 10,612 | | — |
| 1970 | 28,566 | | 169.2% |
| 1980 | 27,332 | | −4.3% |
| 1990 | 25,131 | | −8.1% |
| 2000 | 25,776 | | 2.6% |
| 2010 | 26,212 | | 1.7% |

As of the census of 2000, there were 25,776 people, 10,290 households, and 7,347 families residing in the CDP. The population density was 1,196.2 people/km^{2} (3,098 people/sq mi). There were 10,643 housing units at an average density of 493.9 units/km^{2} (1,279 units/sq mi). The racial makeup of the CDP was 94.39% White, 3.84% African American, 0.20% Native American, 0.43% Asian, 0.03% Pacific Islander, 0.30% from other races, and 0.80% from two or more races. Hispanic or Latino of any race were 0.90% of the population.

There were 10,290 households, out of which 31.4% had children under the age of 18 living with them, 54.9% were married couples living together, 12.1% had a female householder with no husband present, and 28.6% were non-families. 24.4% of all households were made up of individuals, and 9.6% had someone living alone who was 65 years of age or older. The average household size was 2.50 and the average family size was 2.96.

In the CDP, the population was spread out, with 23.8% under the age of 18, 8.7% from 18 to 24, 30.5% from 25 to 44, 23.5% from 45 to 64, and 13.6% who were 65 years of age or older. The median age was 38 years. For every 100 females, there were 95.8 males. For every 100 females age 18 and over, there were 92.3 males.

The median income for a household in the CDP was $42,800 (2005), and the median income for a family was $53,296 (2005). Males had a median income of $35,263 versus $24,457 for females. The per capita income for the CDP was $18,337. About 5.0% of families and 6.6% of the population were below the poverty line, including 7.7% of those under age 18 and 4.6% of those age 65 or over. 8.7% of residents had a bachelor's degree or higher, 21.7% don't have a high school diploma.

== Economy and growth ==
Although growth in Pleasure Ridge Park is fairly slow, the area has seen an increase in small-scale retail in the last few years. Since the completion of the Greenbelt Highway many subdivisions have been built along or near the belt to allow for easy access to I-264 and I-265. Dixie Highway is now home to many national retail and restaurant chains that have opened in this part of Louisville.

There have been an abundance of new jobs in the Riverport area near the Ohio River. Many of these jobs have, of course, sprung up because of the UPS Worldport Expansion at the airport. Most of these jobs are in warehousing and logistics, but still provide the area with new employment opportunities.
