= Robert C. White =

- Born: 1953 (age 72–73)
- Police career
- Country: United States
- Department: Denver Police Department
- Service years: 1972 – 2018
- Rank: Former Chief of Police

Robert C. White (born 1953) is a career police officer and the former chief of police of the Denver Police Department, Denver, Colorado. He was appointed in 2011 by Mayor Michael Hancock, he retired in 2018.

== Early life and education ==
White graduated summa cum laude with a B.A. in Public Administration from the University of the District of Columbia in 1993. He earned an M.S. in Applied Behavioral Science in 1996 from Johns Hopkins University.

== Career ==
White started as a policeman in 1972 with the Metropolitan Police Department of the District of Columbia, Washington, D.C.. He rose to the position of assistant chief before retiring after 23 years in 1995. He was then director of the District of Columbia Housing Authority Office of Public Safety from 1995 until 1997, when he returned to the D.C. police department as assistant chief overseeing patrol operations. He left D.C. in 1998 to become chief of police at the Greensboro, North Carolina Police Department. In 2003 he became the chief of police of the newly formed Louisville Metro Police Department, Louisville, Kentucky.

In 2011, newly elected Denver mayor Michael Hancock appointed White as the new Denver police chief, one of his first high-profile appointments. Hancock, elected in 2010, had promised during his campaign to bring new leadership to the Denver Police Department, after several complaints of excessive force, and allegations of lax discipline for those officers found to have acted improperly.

The Police Executive Research Forum (PERF) conducted the national search that led to White's hiring from the Louisville police department by Hancock. White was a member of PERF when he was hired by Hancock. During the fall of 2015, White became a member of PERF's board of directors.

During the national search, White was vetted by both PERF and Hancock concerning controversies to include a drug test that came back positive for marijuana, and intervening at the scene of a traffic stop when his 21-year-old son was being detained for suspected drunk driving.

== "Cops As Props" Prompts Ethics Inquiry ==
Chief White directed temporary alterations to the Denver Police Academy, and the use of uniformed Denver police officers, to accommodate White House efforts to enhance an address by President Obama to support gun control (attracting national attention because of pushback from some police officers).

Colorado Governor John Hickenlooper had recently signed three legislative house bills limiting ammunition magazines, expanding background checks, and charging gun buyers a fee for background checks. The 3 new gun bills were passed by the Democratic-controlled legislature, and signed into law by the Democratic governor but were opposed by Republicans, the County Sheriffs of Colorado, and Second Amendment activists. The controversy eventually led to a special recall election, the first in Colorado's history, to vote out two Colorado Democrats (Angela Giron of Pueblo and John Morse of Colorado Springs) because of their support for this gun law package.

Soon after the gun bills were signed, the White House began to communicate with Chief White, via Mayor Michael Hancock's office, concerning an upcoming trip to Denver, by President Obama, to advocate for national gun-control laws (by spotlighting Colorado's recent gun-control legislation). President Obama desired to address 300 – 400 Denver metro-area law enforcement officers at the Denver Police Academy. Chief White authorized both on and off-duty Denver police officers to attend in uniform.

At least three Denver police officers, and other law enforcement officers, felt Chief White was using department personnel and facilities as "a vehicle for partisan political influence." Reporting on this story was referred to some in the media as "Cops as Props."

On the same day President Obama was scheduled to give his address at the Denver Police Academy, where Denver police officers would be in uniform as a backdrop, sixteen Colorado sheriffs planned a news conference in a nearby park. Some Denver police officers wanted to attend the Colorado Sheriff's event, in uniform, but their request was denied by Chief White.

National surveys of law enforcement officer's opinions on gun control are rare, but PoliceOne conducted a 10-day survey that resulted in 15,595 responses from verified police professionals across all ranks and department sizes just before President Obama's visit to the Denver Police Academy. The officers surveyed felt the passage of the White House's proposed legislation (i.e. banning manufacture and sale of assault weapons, high capacity magazines, and non-dealer sales or transfers of firearms) would not improve officer safety nor reduce violent crime. Additionally, these law enforcement officers stated they would not enforce more restrictive gun laws if they were Chief or Sheriff, and would support qualified civilians to carry concealed firearms (to include teachers and school administrators).

A Denver police officer filed an inquiry with the Denver Board of Ethics asking if White could use a department building and employees, to publicly support the agenda of one political party, while contemporaneously denying other employees from supporting the agenda of the opposing party at a lawful gathering. The Board responded they did not have jurisdiction over these issues.

== Calls for resignation after memorial vandalized ==
National attention was again drawn when the Denver Police Protective Association (representing Denver police officers) and the Colorado Fraternal Order of Police (representing law enforcement officers in the state) called for White's resignation after a police memorial was allowed to be vandalized on February 15, 2015.

Organized citizens, to include elements of Occupy Denver and Anonymous, organized, planned, and executed a protest in Denver concerning people killed by police nationally (Michael Brown and Eric Garner) and locally (Jessica Hernandez). In preparation for the marching protesters' arrival at the Denver Police Headquarters building, where a memorial for fallen Denver officers is displayed in an outside courtyard, Denver officers were deployed inside the building's lobby. Unidentified protesters lowered and desecrated the American flag, by leaving it lying on the ground, and left adhesive stickers with threatening messages to specific Denver officers on the granite memorial wall. Two additional protesters, Robert Guerrero and Matthew Goldberg, poured red paint over the memorial and spray painted "Fuck The Police" in white.

Denver police officers, staged inside the lobby and viewing the vandalism, were ordered not to exit the building to prevent or intervene in the criminal activity. This decision angered the officers viewing the desecration of the American flag and memorial for their fallen co-workers, some to the point of crying.

White's Public Information Officer, Sonny Jackson, informed media the American flag was not desecrated and no threats were left behind.

Manager of Safety Stephanie O'Malley was asked to resign as more calls for White's resignation followed.

A week after the vandalism and desecration, a public rally was held in support of the Denver Police. At the conclusion of the rally, two Denver police officers replaced the desecrated flag, apparently still flying from the week before, in an impromptu ceremony. Veith wrote a satirical piece warning White's administration not to punish the two officers, but reports indicate White's Deputy Chief
