= English Station, Louisville =

Neighborhood in Louisville, Kentucky

Coordinates: 38°14′10″N 85°28′27″W

English Station is a neighborhood of Louisville, Kentucky centered along Shelbyville Road (US 60) and the Floyds Fork watershed.
