= Historic Firehouses of Louisville =

Multiple listing in the U.S. National Register of Historic Places

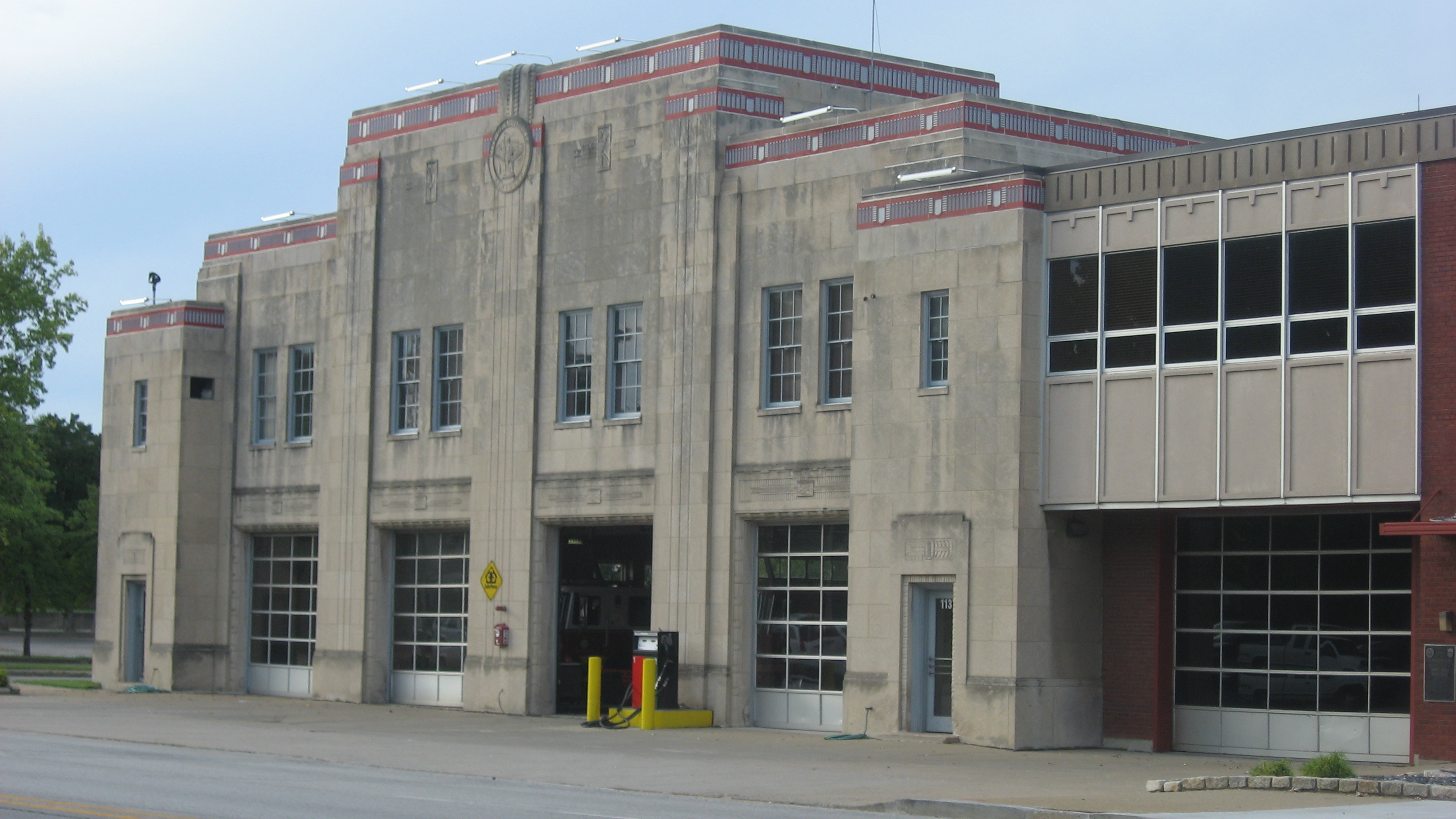
Built by the WPA in 1936, the Louisville Fire Department Headquarters is listed on the National Register of Historic Places.

The Historic Firehouses of Louisville is a Thematic Resource (TR) Multiple Property Submission (MPS) on the National Register of Historic Places. The submission represents 18 historic fire stations, located in Louisville, Kentucky, which were added to the National Register in 1980–81 due to their historical and architectural merits.

== History of firefighting in Louisville ==
Louisville's first fire brigades were established in 1780, two years after the city's creation. The first firehouses were volunteer fire departments scattered throughout the city, but on June 1, 1858, the city of Louisville took control, and replaced the hand engines with five steam engines and volunteers with paid staff. There were initially three fire stations, 65 professional firefighters, and 23 horses.

Many of the early firehouses were demolished due to urban renewal; the oldest firehouse still standing was originally built as St. John's Church in 1848, but the city turned the two-story edifice of brick and cast iron located in Phoenix Hill into a firehouse in 1869. Three additional remaining firehouses were built in the 1870s and 1880s (Steam Engine Co. #7 in Limerick (1871), Steam Engine Co. #10 in Butchertown (1873), and the Rogers Street Firehouse in Irish Hill (1883)).

Formed on October 7, 1871, as the Louisville Steam Engine Co. 7, Engine Company 7, at 6th & York Streets, is the oldest continuously operated firehouse in the United States. Due to budget concerns, it is scheduled to close in January 2009, in hopes to save $543,000 from the city's budget.

The most prominent of the firehouses built in the 1890s was the Fire Department Headquarters built in Downtown Louisville at 617 W. Jefferson Street in 1891. It is Richardsonian Romanesque in style, as it was designed by the McDonald Brothers, who also designed the Kentucky National Bank and Norton's Warehouse buildings in downtown Louisville.

The current fire department headquarters, at 1135 W. Jefferson Street (just outside downtown Louisville), was built in 1936 by the WPA. This limestone edifice is one of the few buildings in Louisville built in the Art Deco style. When the fire department moved out, the former headquarters became home to the police traffic bureau and eventually became the Louisville Sinking Fund Building.

== Firehouses ==
Property	Photo	Built	Location	Description
Fire Department Headquarters		November 7, 1981	1135 W. Jefferson St. 38°14′37″N 85°47′9″W	
Firehouse No. 13		March 10, 1881	100 N. 34th St. 38°15′44″N 85°48′25″W	
Hook and Ladder Company No. 2		November 7, 1890	221 S. Hancock St. 38°15′11″N 85°44′31″W	
Hook and Ladder Company No. 3		November 7, 1890	Frankfort Ave. and Pope St. 38°15′25″N 85°43′0″W	
Hook and Ladder Company No. 4		November 7, 1890	2301 Jefferson St. 38°15′28″N 85°47′22″W	
Hook and Ladder Company No. 5		November 7, 1890	1824 Garland Ave. 38°15′15″N 85°41′44″W	
Steam Engine Company No. 2		November 7, 1890	617-621 W. Jefferson St. 38°15′16″N 85°45′41″W	
Steam Engine Company No. 3		November 7, 1890	802-804 E. Main St. 38°15′16″N 85°44′14″W	
Steam Engine Company No. 4 (Logan Street)		November 7, 1890	1024 Logan St. 38°14′10″N 85°44′23″W	
Steam Engine Company No. 4 (Main Street)		November 7, 1890	1617 W. Main St. 38°15′33″N 85°46′39″W	
Steam Engine Company No. 7		November 7, 1890	821 S. 6th St. 38°14′38″N 85°45′43″W	
Steam Engine Company No. 10		November 7, 1890	1419 E. Washington; 38°15′29″N 85°43′36″W	
Steam Engine Company No. 11		November 7, 1890	1122 Rogers; 38°14′46″N 85°43′38″W	
Steam Engine Company No. 18		November 7, 1890	2600 S. 4th St. 38°13′33″N 85°45′54″W	
Steam Engine Company No. 20 (1330 Bardstown Road)		November 7, 1890	1330 Bardstown Rd. 38°13′48″N 85°45′1″W	
Steam Engine Company No. 20 (1735 Bardstown Road)		November 7, 1890	1735 Bardstown Rd. 38°12′41″N 85°45′52″W	
Steam Engine Company No. 21		November 7, 1890	1761 Frankfort Ave. 38°14′20″N 85°48′2″W	
Steam Engine Company No. 22		November 7, 1890	37th and Broadway; 38°14′4″N 85°42′59″W	

== See also ==
- Louisville Division of Fire
- List of fire stations (worldwide)
