= Smoketown, Louisville =

- Smoketown Historic District
- U.S. National Register of Historic Places
- U.S. Historic district
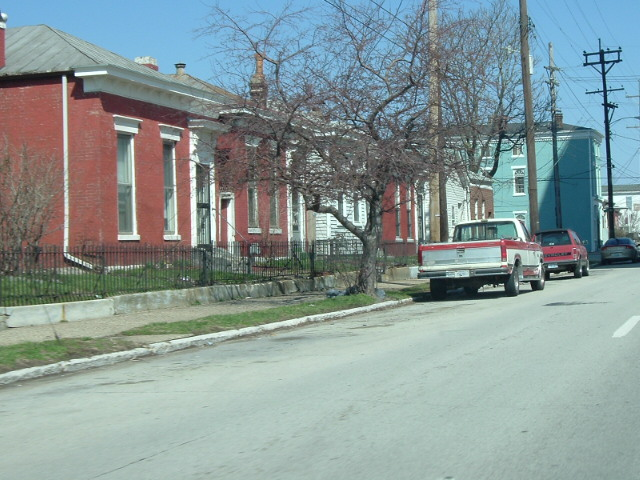
- Logan Street in Smoketown

- Location within Kentucky Location within the United States
- Location: Roughly bounded by Preston, Caldwell, and Jacob Sts., and the alley east of Shelby St., Louisville, Kentucky
- Coordinates: 38°14′27″N 85°44′38″W
- Area: 780 acres (3.2 km^{2})
- Architectural style: Shotgun house
- NRHP reference No.: 97000661
- Added to NRHP: 1997

Smoketown is a neighborhood one mile (1.6 km) southeast of downtown Louisville, Kentucky. A historically black neighborhood since the Civil War, it is the only neighborhood in the city that has had such a continuous presence. Smoketown is bounded by Broadway, CSX railroad tracks, Kentucky Street, and I-65.

== History ==
The neighborhood's name apparently comes from the large number of (smoke-producing) kilns in the area during its early brick-making days. An 1823 newspaper advertises a brickyard in the area as part of the farm and residence of "the late Mark Lampton", after whom Lampton Street is probably named. 9 of 20 brickyards in the city had Smoketown addresses according to an 1871 Caron's directory, although none remained by 1880, as apparently the supply of clay from under the neighborhood had run out. The abandoned, water-filled clay pits may have given rise to the name "Frogtown" for the neighborhood, which appeared in print in 1880.

Some residential development by whites of German ancestry began in the 1850s, but due to the arrival of thousands of freed slaves who moved there from various parts of rural Kentucky after the Civil War, it was solidly African American by 1870. A streetcar line was extended down Preston Street to Kentucky in 1865, spurring growth.

With its shotgun houses and narrow streets, Smoketown was a densely populated area with a population of over 15,000 by 1880. African American property ownership was rare, with most living in properties rented from whites.

By the 1960s the area had high crime and unemployment rates, causing massive population loss. Many of the old shotgun houses have been razed and housing projects built in their place. Since the 1950s, Smoketown has been massively depopulated. As of 2000, the population of Smoketown was 2,116, a decrease of over 38% from 1990.

== Revitalization ==
In May 2011, Louisville received a $22 million federal Hope VI award that will allow the demolition of the deteriorating Sheppard Square housing project, replacing it with new, mixed-income housing. In Mayor Fischer's Budget Address of May 26, 2011, he said:

You all heard the exciting news this week about Sheppard Square. The project will have a value of $157 million over the next decade. Our budget includes $1.6 million to help integrate that new development into the surrounding neighborhood. That will not only make the area a better place to live, but will set the table for the private businesses that settle into any healthy neighborhood.

On July 12, 2012, Construction of nine new homes has recently begun near the site of the former Sheppard Square housing development. The nine homes consist of eight in the 500 block of East Breckinridge and one on South Shelby Street.

On December 10, 2012, construction began between Hancock, Jacob, Finzer and Jackson Streets, on a $100 million redevelopment of a new, and revitalized mixed-income Sheppard Square housing neighborhood, with a completion date of December 2015.

On December 1, 2020, Mayor Greg Fischer entered an agreement with community development organization REBOUND to establish a community land trust (CLT) in the Russell and Smoketown neighborhoods. $2.1 million in federal Community Development Block Grant funds were allocated to invest in gentrification-resistant affordable housing in the areas. REBOUND entered into a partnership with Bates CDC and River City Housing, with REBOUND focusing on the Russell neighborhood and the latter two focusing on the Smoketown neighborhood.

== Demographics ==
As of 2000, the population of Smoketown was 2,232, of which 13.1% is white, 81.2% is black, 1.8% is listed as other, and 3.8% is Hispanic. College graduates make up 6.0% of the population, and people without a high school degree make up 42.7%. Females outnumber males 53.4% to 46.6%.

== Notable locations ==
- Albert E. Meyzeek Middle School is located in the neighborhood at 828 S Jackson St.
- Bates Memorial Missionary Baptist Church is located in Smoketown at 620 E Lampton St.
- The Presbyterian Community Center at 701 S Hancock St. was a feature of the Smoketown neighborhood for over 115 years when it closed in 2013. In 2015, Jefferson County Public Schools took over the building to offer Early Head Start programming and renamed the center the Ernest 'Camp' Edwards Education Complex.

== See also ==
- William Henry Sheppard, religious and community leader for whom Sheppard Park and Sheppard Square Housing Project in Smoketown are named
