= Louisville Division of Fire =

American local government agency

Operational area
- Country: United States
- State: Kentucky
- City: Louisville

Agency overview
- Established: June 1, 1858
- Annual calls: 46,782 (2022)
- Employees: 501 (2017)
- Annual budget: $85,217,200 (FY 2023)
- Staffing: Career
- Fire chief: Brian C. O’Neill
- EMS level: BLS
- IAFF: 54

Facilities and equipment
- Battalions: 4
- Stations: 21
- Engines: 18
- Trucks: 4
- Platforms: 1
- Quints: 3
- Rescues: 3
- HAZMAT: 3
- USAR: 2
- Airport crash: 1
- Wildland: 1
- Fireboats: 2
- Rescue boats: 4
- Light and air: 1

Website
- Official website
- IAFF website

The Louisville Division of Fire, commonly known as the Louisville Fire Department or Louisville Fire & Rescue (abbreviated LFD or LFR), is the sole fire suppression agency for the city of Louisville, Kentucky and is one of eight fire departments within the Louisville-Jefferson County, Kentucky metropolitan area. The Louisville Division of Fire responded to 46,782 incidents in 2022. As of 2025 the Chief of Department was Brian C. O'Neill.

== History ==
The Louisville Fire Department is the third oldest all-paid staff fire department in the nation. The first fire brigades established in Louisville were in 1780, two years after the city's creation. The first firehouses in Louisville were volunteer fire departments scattered throughout the city until June 1, 1858, when the city took control and replaced the hand engines with five steam engines and volunteers with paid staff. There were initially three fire stations, 65 full-time firefighters, and 23 horses.

== Operations ==
The Louisville Division of Fire currently operates out of 21 fire stations, located throughout the city in 4 battalions. Each battalion is commanded by a battalion chief. The 4 battalions are under the command of a citywide tour commander each shift. The Louisville Division of Fire operates 18 engine companies, 8 truck companies (including 3 quints), 2 rescue companies, 3 HazMat units, 3 fireboats, 1 ventilation unit, 5 utility mule ATVs, and numerous special, support, and reserve units.

Rescue Company 2 (housed with, and staffed by, the crews of Engine 2 and Truck 1) provides high-angle and dive rescue services. Rescue Company 7 (housed with, and staffed by, the crew of Quint 7) provides trench and structural collapse rescue services. Hazardous materials incidents are handled by Haz-Mat Companies 1, 19, and 21. Haz-Mat Company 1 is housed with Engine 1, adjacent the Louisville International Airport. Haz-Mat Company 19 is housed with Engine 19 in the city's west side, near the Rubbertown area, which is home to many industrial plants. Haz-Mat Company 21 is housed with Engine 21 on the city's northeast side, near downtown.

== Stations and apparatus ==
Below is a list of stations and apparatus in use by the Louisville Division of Fire.

Firehouse #	Neighborhood	Engine Company	Aerial Company	Special Units	Chief Units	Battalion
1	Standiford	Engine 1		HazMat 1		3
2	Russell	Engine 2	Truck 1	Rescue 2 (Water Rescue), Utility 502	Chief 5 (Tour Commander), Battalion 5 (Safety Officer)	1
3	Bowman		Quint 10	ATV 703	Battalion 4	4
4	Crescent Hill	Engine 4		Rescue 4 (Zodiac Boat)		4
5	Downtown	Engine 5	Tower 2	ATV 705, Utility 505	Battalion 2	2
6	Portland	Engine 6		ATV 706		1
8	Klondike	Engine 8				4
9	Smoketown	Engine 9				2
10	Beechmont	Engine 10	Truck 8		Battalion 3	3
11	Original Highlands		Quint 7	Rescue 7 (Technical Rescue), MSAR 7		4
12	Hazelwood	Engine 12		Rehab 12, MSAR 12, Utility 512		3
14	Camp Taylor		Quint 9			3
15	Shelby Park	Engine 15		Vent 15		2
16	University of Louisville	Engine 16	Truck 3	Air Utility 16		2
17	California	Engine 17				1
18	South Louisville	Engine 18				3
19	Park DuValle	Engine 19		HazMat 19, Decon 19, Nozzle 19		1
20	Bonnycastle	Engine 20				4
21	Butchertown	Engine 21		HazMat 21, ATV 721		2
22	Shawnee	Engine 22	Truck 4		Battalion 1	1
23	Kenwood Hill	Engine 23		ATV 723		3

== See also ==
- Historic Firehouses of Louisville
  - Louisville Firehouse No. 2
  - Steam Engine Company No. 7
