= Shively, Kentucky =

- City
- Location of Shively in Jefferson County, Kentucky

- Location within the state of Kentucky Shively (the United States)
- Coordinates: 38°11′35″N 85°48′58″W
- Country: United States
- State: Kentucky
- County: Jefferson
- Incorporated: 1938

Government
  - Type: Mayor–council government
  - Mayor: Maria Johnson

Area
  - Total: 4.58 sq mi (11.86 km^{2})
  - Land: 4.57 sq mi (11.84 km^{2})
  - Water: 0.0077 sq mi (0.02 km^{2})
- Elevation: 453 ft (138 m)

Population (2020)
  - Total: 15,636
  - Density: 3,420.2/sq mi (1,320.55/km^{2})
- Time zone: UTC-5 (Eastern (EST))
  - Summer (DST): UTC-4 (EDT)
- ZIP codes: 40216, 40256
- Area code: 502
- FIPS code: 21-70284
- GNIS feature ID: 2405462
- Website: shivelyky.gov

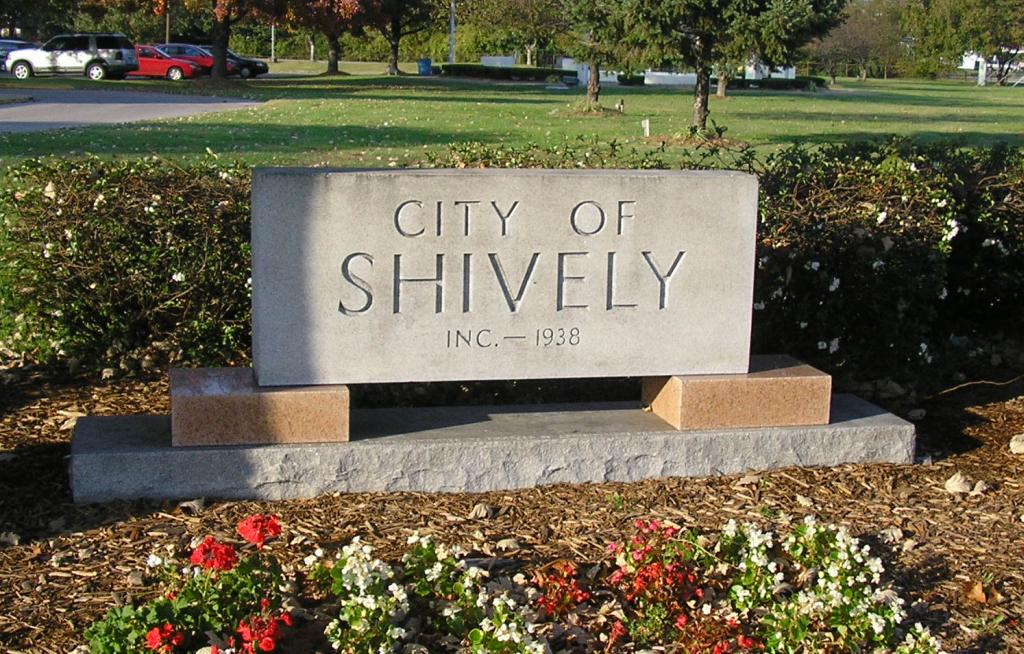
Monument at Shively City Hall

Shively is a home rule-class city in Jefferson County, Kentucky, United States, and a suburb of Louisville within the Louisville Metro government. As of the 2020 census, Shively had a population of 15,636.

== History ==
=== 18th century ===
After Louisville was founded at the Falls of the Ohio in 1778, farms spread out into the nearby countryside. Early landowners included Col. William Pope, Maj. Abner Field, and the Shivelys, Christian William and Jacob. Christian opened a mill and tavern on his 1,000-acre (400 ha) tract near Mill Creek and the road connecting Louisville to the Salt River. (The road would later be incorporated as the Louisville and Nashville Turnpike.) The buildings became the focus of a settlement known as the "Shively precinct".

=== 19th century ===
In 1816, Christian donated the land for a church that is today known as Parkview Methodist.

A stagecoach stop was opened in 1831. The Elizabethtown and Paducah Railroad arrived in the 1870s.

Shortly before the Civil War, the area became popular among German immigrants, mostly from Bavaria. In 1897, they erected St. Helen's Catholic Church. The community was commonly known as "St. Helen's" for the next few years, but the post office (established 1902) could not adopt it because there was another community with the name in Lee County.

=== 20th century ===
A streetcar line was extended to the area in 1904.

Eight whiskey distilleries opened nearby after the end of Prohibition. When Louisville tried to annex and tax them during the Great Depression, the distillers talked the residents of Shively into incorporating separately (finalized May 23, 1938) and annexing their district instead. Their $20-million revenue stream left the small city well funded.

During the 1950s, it became the state's fastest-growing city as white flight and suburbanization reached Louisville.

The area was long de facto segregated as a whites-only neighborhood. In 1954, black Korean War veteran and electrician Andrew Wade IV and his wife Charlotte, who had found themselves unable to buy a home in a suburban neighborhood due to Jim Crow housing discrimination, got help from activists Carl and Anne Braden. The Wades selected a house in Shively that they wanted to buy, and the Bradens bought it on their behalf and deeded it over to them. Soon afterwards, the Wades' home was repeatedly attacked—including cross burning on an adjacent lot, rocks through their windows, rifle shots into the house, and ultimately a dynamite bomb that exploded under their daughter's bedroom while they were in the home (no one was injured). The news made national headlines. Anne Braden wrote a 1958 memoir, The Wall Between. No one was ever convicted of the crime. But the Bradens were charged with sedition for their actions. Carl Braden was convicted and sentenced to 15 years in prison; he spent seven months in jail before state-level sedition convictions were overturned by a U.S. Supreme Court ruling in a related case in 1956. After the bombing, the Wades left and very few other blacks attempted to move in, and the community remained a largely white "sundown town" well into the 1960s. Since the 1970s, the black population has grown to about 30 percent, a greater percentage than in the Louisville metropolitan area as a whole, and more than double the percentage in the U.S. population as a whole.

Increased taxes and changing tastes closed most of Shively's distilleries in the late 1960s. Shively's population has gradually declined since reaching 19,223 in 1970. Budget surpluses became shortfalls, and Shively tried but failed to annex more suburban territory in Pleasure Ridge Park in 1984. The same year, the town was hit with a scandal when police chief Michael Donio admitted to taking bribes to allow prostitution in the area. Such events led to the community's reputation as "Lively Shively" (as the name of the town is pronounced with a "long i", this is a rhyme).

=== 21st century ===
The area's fortunes have since improved somewhat, with various public works projects occurring and some businesses moving to the area. However, the area along Seventh Street north of Dixie is still known for its seedy adult entertainment businesses. Into the 2000s, the area lagged behind eastern and southern Jefferson County, with one of its few remaining large retail centers, the 150,000-square-foot (14,000 m^{2}) Dillard's on Dixie Highway (established 1956), closing in 2007 due to slow sales at the location despite the chain's general profitability in the Louisville area.

Shively remains the site of one major operating distillery: Brown-Forman's Early Times distillery. Its products include Early Times, which was first produced in 1860. It became one of the few brands that was allowed to be produced during the Prohibition era, and was the best-selling whiskey in the country in the mid-1950s. Another is Old Forester; first produced in 1870, it was the first bourbon sold exclusively in sealed bottles and is today the oldest continually produced brand. The former Stitzel-Weller distillery has been converted into a tourist attraction for the Bulleit Bourbon brand, and was included as a stop on the Kentucky Bourbon Trail in 2014. In 2015, the Michter's bourbon brand opened a new distillery in Shively.

On November 5, 2018, Democrat Beverly Chester Burton became the first African-American to be elected mayor of Shively.

== Geography ==
Shively is centered on the junction of US 60 and the Dixie Highway (US 31W) near 38°11′35″N 85°48′58″W. Its modern boundaries are roughly Millers and Bernheim Lane to the north (Louisville's Algonquin neighborhood); Louisville's Seventh Street to the east; I-264 and St. Dennis to the west; and Rockford Lane and Pleasure Ridge Park to the south. Shively is 5 miles (8 km) southwest of downtown Louisville.

According to the United States Census Bureau, Shively has a total area of 4.6 square miles (11.9 km^{2}), of which 0.01 square miles (0.02 km^{2}), or 1.73%, are water.

== Demographics ==
Historical population
Census	Pop.	Note	%±
1940	1,273		—
1950	2,401		88.6%
1960	15,155		531.2%
1970	19,139		26.3%
1980	16,645		−13.0%
1990	15,535		−6.7%
2000	15,157		−2.4%
2010	15,264		0.7%
2020	15,636		2.4%
2024 (est.)	15,850		1.4%
U.S. Decennial Census

=== Racial and ethnic composition ===
Shively, Kentucky – Racial and ethnic composition Note: the U.S. census treats Hispanic/Latino as an ethnic category. This table excludes Latinos from the racial categories and assigns them to a separate category. Hispanics/Latinos may be of any race.
Race / Ethnicity (NH = Non-Hispanic)	Pop 2000	Pop 2010	Pop 2020	% 2000	% 2010	2020
White alone (NH)	10,121	6,835	5,080	66.77%	44.78%	32.49%
Black or African American alone (NH)	4,573	7,385	8,533	30.17%	48.38%	54.57%
Native American or Alaska Native alone (NH)	39	25	39	0.26%	0.16%	0.25%
Asian alone (NH)	63	100	110	0.42%	0.66%	0.70%
Pacific Islander alone (NH)	0	12	7	0.00%	0.08%	0.04%
Some Other Race alone (NH)	17	47	54	0.11%	0.31%	0.35%
Mixed Race or Multi-Racial (NH)	133	319	678	0.88%	2.09%	4.34%
Hispanic or Latino (any race)	211	541	1,135	1.39%	3.54%	7.26%
Total	15,157	15,264	15,636	100.00%	100.00%	100.00%

=== 2020 census ===
As of the 2020 census, Shively had a population of 15,636. The median age was 40.2 years. 23.6% of residents were under the age of 18 and 16.4% of residents were 65 years of age or older. For every 100 females there were 88.0 males, and for every 100 females age 18 and over there were 84.7 males age 18 and over.

100.0% of residents lived in urban areas, while 0.0% lived in rural areas.

There were 6,500 households in Shively, of which 30.1% had children under the age of 18 living in them. Of all households, 27.8% were married-couple households, 23.2% were households with a male householder and no spouse or partner present, and 41.9% were households with a female householder and no spouse or partner present. About 35.4% of all households were made up of individuals and 13.5% had someone living alone who was 65 years of age or older.

There were 6,935 housing units, of which 6.3% were vacant. The homeowner vacancy rate was 1.3% and the rental vacancy rate was 6.2%.

=== 2000 census ===
As of the census of 2000, there were 15,157 people, 6,667 households, and 4,080 families residing in the city. The population density was 3,271.1 inhabitants per square mile (1,263.0/km^{2}). There were 6,929 housing units at an average density of 1,495.4 per square mile (577.4/km^{2}). The racial makeup of the city was 67.26% White, 30.32% African American, 0.26% Native American, 0.42% Asian, 0.78% from other races, and 0.96% from two or more races. Hispanic or Latino of any race were 1.39% of the population.

There were 6,667 households, out of which 25.6% had children under the age of 18 living with them, 40.1% were married couples living together, 17.0% had a female householder with no husband present, and 38.8% were non-families. 34.0% of all households were made up of individuals, and 14.9% had someone living alone who was 65 years of age or older. The average household size was 2.23 and the average family size was 2.84.

In the city, the population was spread out, with 21.7% under the age of 18, 7.7% from 18 to 24, 28.2% from 25 to 44, 21.7% from 45 to 64, and 20.7% who were 65 years of age or older. The median age was 40 years. For every 100 females, there were 85.0 males. For every 100 females age 18 and over, there were 79.9 males.

The median income for a household in the city was $31,422, and the median income for a family was $38,652. Males had a median income of $31,368 versus $25,190 for females. The per capita income for the city was $17,574. About 12.2% of families and 14.5% of the population were below the poverty line, including 26.7% of those under age 18 and 10.2% of those age 65 or over.

== Education ==
Shively has a lending library, a branch of the Louisville Free Public Library.

== See also ==
- List of sundown towns in the United States
- List of U.S. communities with African-American majority populations in 2020
