= National Register of Historic Places listings in The Highlands, Louisville, Kentucky =

This is a list of properties and historic districts on the National Register of Historic Places in The Highlands, Louisville, Kentucky. The table below includes 32 listings in the following neighborhoods:

- Belknap
- Bonnycastle
- Cherokee Triangle
- Deer Park
- Hawthorne
- Hayfield Dundee
- Highlands–Douglass
- Irish Hill
- Original Highlands
- Tyler Park

Latitude and longitude coordinates of the sites listed on this page may be displayed in a map or exported in several formats by clicking on one of the links in the box below the map to the right.

National Register sites elsewhere in Jefferson County are listed separately.

This National Park Service list is complete through NPS recent listings posted April 24, 2026.

== Current listings ==
	Name on the Register	Image	Date listed	Location	Neighborhood	Description
1	Leslie V. Abbott House	Leslie V. Abbott House	July 30, 2013 (#13000558)	2401 Newburg Rd. 38°12′49″N 85°42′01″W	Belknap	
2	William R. Belknap School	William R. Belknap School	August 12, 1982 (#82002706)	1800 Sils Ave. 38°13′19″N 85°41′23″W	Belknap	
3	Bullock-Clifton House	Bullock-Clifton House	May 6, 1982 (#82002707)	1824 Rosedale Ave. 38°13′27″N 85°42′15″W	Deer Park	
4	Calvary Evangelical Lutheran Church		March 13, 2017 (#100000740)	1838 Bardstown Rd. 38°13′39″N 85°41′59″W		
5	John B. Castleman Monument	John B. Castleman Monument	July 17, 1997 (#97000690)	Junction of Cherokee Rd. and Cherokee Parkway; 38°14′07″N 85°42′45″W	Cherokee Triangle	
6	Cave Hill Cemetery	Cave Hill Cemetery	December 11, 1979 (#79000999)	701 Baxter Ave. 38°14′44″N 85°42′56″W	Cherokee Triangle	
7	Cave Hill National Cemetery	Cave Hill National Cemetery	September 3, 1998 (#98001133)	701 Baxter Ave. 38°14′56″N 85°43′20″W	Cherokee Triangle	
8	Cherokee Triangle Area Residential District	Cherokee Triangle Area Residential District	June 30, 1976 (#76000902)	Roughly bounded by Bardstown Rd., Sherwood Ave., and Broadway, east to the junction of Grinstead Dr. and Cherokee Parkway; 38°14′22″N 85°42′56″W	Cherokee Triangle	
9	Commodore Apartment Building	Commodore Apartment Building	April 29, 1982 (#82002709)	2140 Bonnycastle Ave. 38°13′58″N 85°42′03″W	Bonnycastle	
10	Engelhard House	Engelhard House	December 5, 1980 (#80001599)	1080 Baxter Ave. 38°14′15″N 85°43′21″W	Tyler Park	
11	Farmington	Farmington	October 18, 1972 (#72000536)	3033 Bardstown Rd. 38°12′53″N 85°40′05″W	Hawthorne	
12	Nicholas Finzer House	Nicholas Finzer House	May 9, 1979 (#79001004)	1212 Hull St. 38°14′53″N 85°43′39″W	Irish Hill	
13	Hayfield		August 19, 1980 (#80001600)	1809 Tyler Lane; 38°12′28″N 85°41′10″W	Hayfield Dundee	
14	Highlands Historic District	Highlands Historic District	February 11, 1983 (#83002680)	Roughly bounded by Barrett Ave., Eastern Parkway, Bardstown Road, and Fernwood, Woodbourne, Ellerbee, and Sherwood Aves. 38°14′22″N 85°43′36″W	Original Highlands	
15	Howard-Gettys House	Howard-Gettys House	February 8, 1978 (#78001356)	1226 Bates Ct. 38°13′45″N 85°43′24″W	Tyler Park	
16	Humphrey-McMeekin House	Humphrey-McMeekin House	March 20, 1986 (#86000475)	2240 Douglass Boulevard; 38°13′42″N 85°41′09″W	Highlands–Douglass	
17	Irish Hill Historic District		April 23, 2024 (#100010253)	Roughly bounded by I-64, Lexington Road, Bishop Street, and Cave Hill Cemetery; 38°15′06″N 85°43′18″W	Irish Hill	
18	Kentucky Home School for Girls		August 2, 2017 (#100001422)	2305 Douglass Blvd. 38°13′48″N 85°41′09″W		
19	Klotz Confectionary Company		February 11, 2016 (#16000007)	731 Brent St. 38°14′35″N 85°44′05″W		
20	Nelson Distillery Warehouse	Nelson Distillery Warehouse	June 27, 2014 (#14000423)	100 Distillery Commons Dr. 38°15′00″N 85°43′23″W	Irish Hill	Now the Distillery Commons.
21	Rose Hill	Rose Hill	December 3, 1980 (#80001616)	1835 Hampden Ct. 38°13′43″N 85°41′54″W	Highlands–Douglass	
22	Saint Francis of Assisi Complex	Saint Francis of Assisi Complex	May 29, 1987 (#87000850)	1960 Bardstown Rd. 38°13′33″N 85°41′52″W	Deer Park	
23	St. James Roman Catholic Church, Rectory, and School	St. James Roman Catholic Church, Rectory, and School	March 1, 1982 (#82002722)	1430 Bardstown Rd., 1826 Edenside Ave, and 1818 Edenside Ave. 38°13′57″N 85°42′39″W	Tyler Park	
24	Valentine Schneikert House	Valentine Schneikert House	April 17, 1986 (#86000848)	1234 Lexington Rd. 38°14′58″N 85°43′38″W	Irish Hill	
25	Schuster Building	Schuster Building	March 19, 1980 (#80001618)	1500-1512 Bardstown Rd. 38°13′54″N 85°42′32″W	Deer Park	
26	Steam Engine Company No. 11	Steam Engine Company No. 11	November 7, 1980 (#80001623)	1122 Rogers St. 38°14′45″N 85°43′38″W	Irish Hill	
27	Steam Engine Company No. 20	Steam Engine Company No. 20	November 7, 1980 (#80001626)	1330 Bardstown Rd. 38°14′04″N 85°42′51″W	Tyler Park	
28	Steam Engine Company No. 20	Steam Engine Company No. 20	November 7, 1980 (#80004498)	1735 Bardstown Rd. 38°13′45″N 85°42′06″W	Bonnycastle	
29	Struss House		November 7, 2003 (#03001112)	1920 Winston Ave. 38°12′55″N 85°41′09″W	Hayfield Dundee	
30	Union Monument in Louisville	Union Monument in Louisville	July 17, 1997 (#97000687)	701 Baxter Ave. 38°14′54″N 85°43′20″W	Irish Hill	Cave Hill Cemetery, junction of Payne St. and Lexington Rd.
31	David Wilson House	David Wilson House	March 26, 1987 (#87000511)	2215 Carolina Ave. 38°13′46″N 85°41′02″W	Highlands–Douglass	
32	Woodbourne House	Woodbourne House	February 7, 2008 (#08000008)	2024 Woodford Pl. 38°13′33″N 85°41′38″W	Highlands–Douglass	

== Former listing ==
	Name on the Register	Image	Date listed	Date removed	Location	Neighborhood	Description
1	August Bloedner Monument	August Bloedner Monument	July 17, 1997 (#97000688)	November 19, 2010	701 Baxter Ave. 38°14′54″N 85°43′19″W	Cherokee Triangle	Formerly in the Cave Hill Cemetery, junction of Payne St. and Lexington Rd. Now located at the Frazier History Museum. Delisted due to relocation of the monument.

== See also ==
- National Register of Historic Places listings in Jefferson County, Kentucky
- List of National Historic Landmarks in Kentucky
- List of attractions and events in the Louisville metropolitan area
