= Commodore Apartment Building =

Commodore Apartment Building may refer to:

- Commodore Apartment Building (Louisville, Kentucky), listed on the NRHP in Kentucky
- Commodore Apartment Building (Shaker Heights, Ohio), listed on the NRHP in Ohio
