= Clifton House =

Clifton House may refer to:

== United Kingdom ==
- Clifton House, Belfast, a historic building in Northern Ireland
- Clifton House, King's Lynn, a grade I listed building in King's Lynn, Norfolk
- Clifton Park and Museum, Rotherham, South Yorkshire
- Clifton House School, a defunct private boys' school in Harrogate, North Yorkshire, England

== United States ==
- Clifton House, Pennsylvania, a historic building in Fort Washington, Pennsylvania
- Clifton House Site, overnight stop on the Santa Fe Trail

== See also ==
- Bullock-Clifton House
- Clifton House Preparatory School
