= Woodbourne =

Woodbourne may refer to:

in Barbados

- Woodbourne, Barbados, settlement in Barbados

in New Zealand

- Woodbourne, New Zealand, settlement in Marlborough, New Zealand
  - RNZAF Base Woodbourne, air base in New Zealand

in the United Kingdom

- Woodbourne Group, a Birmingham-based real estate development firm
- Woodbourne House, a Grade II listed building in West Shepton, Shepton Mallet, Somerset, England

in the United States

(by state)

- Woodbourne House, Louisville, KY, listed on the NRHP in Kentucky
- Woodbourne Historic District, Boston, MA, listed on the NRHP in Massachusetts
- Woodbourne Centre, Baltimore, Maryland, located in Tivoli (Baltimore, Maryland), a historic building on the NRHP in Maryland
- Woodbourne, New York
  - Woodbourne Correctional Facility, medium security men's prison in Woodbourne, New York
  - Woodbourne Reformed Church Complex, Woodbourne, NY, listed on the NRHP in New York
- Woodbourne (Roxobel, North Carolina), listed on the NRHP in North Carolina
- Woodbourne-Hyde Park, Ohio, an unincorporated area in Washington Township in Montgomery County, Ohio, United States.
- Woodbourne, Pennsylvania
- Woodbourne (Forest, Virginia), listed on the NRHP in Virginia
- Woodbourne (Madison, Virginia), listed on the NRHP in Virginia
