= Margaret Weissinger Castleman =

American suffragist and campaigner (1880–1945)

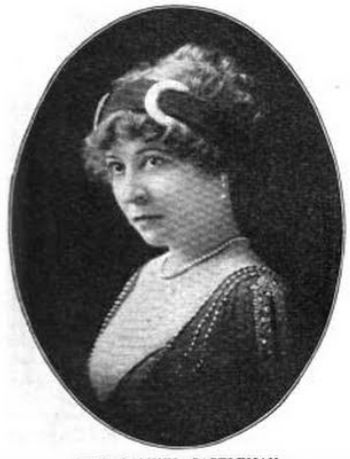
- Born: c. 1880; Louisville, Kentucky, US
- Died: 1945
- Burial place: Cave Hill Cemetery, Louisville, Kentucky
- Political party: Democratic Party
- Spouse: Samuel Torbitt Castleman (m. 1910)
- Children: 4

Margaret Weissinger Castleman (c. 1880–April 26, 1945) was an American suffragist and campaigner for the Democratic Party.

== Family ==
Weissinger was born in 1880 in Louisville, Kentucky. She was the daughter of Colonel Harry Weissinger, a tobacco industry businessman, and Isabelle "Belle" Weissinger (née Muir). Her father was from an old Kentucky family. She had five siblings and was presented as a debutante in 1900.

== Activism ==
Weissinger began giving speeches in support of votes for women in 1909. She rose to hold leadership positions in the suffrage movement, becoming president of the Louisville Woman Suffrage Association and second vice president of the Kentucky Equal Rights Association.

At an annual benefit event for the Louisville Business Women's Club, she attended in a dress which showed her support for the enfranchisement of women. As the Courier-Journal reported: "around the hem of her skirt were the twelve names of the Western States which have suffrage, and across the back was written, 'Votes for Women.'"

Weissinger became a member of Democratic Party and was elected to the Women's National Executive Committee of the Democratic National Committee in 1920. In 1921, she was a speaker at a rally for W. Overton Harris, the Democratic candidate for Mayor, and an excerpt of her speech appeared in African-American newspaper The Louisville Leader.

== Personal life ==
Weissinger married Samuel Torbitt Castleman in 1910. They had four children.

== Death ==
Castleman died of a heart attack in 1945 and was buried at Cave Hill Cemetery, Louisville, Kentucky.
