= Woodbourne House =

- U.S. National Register of Historic Places
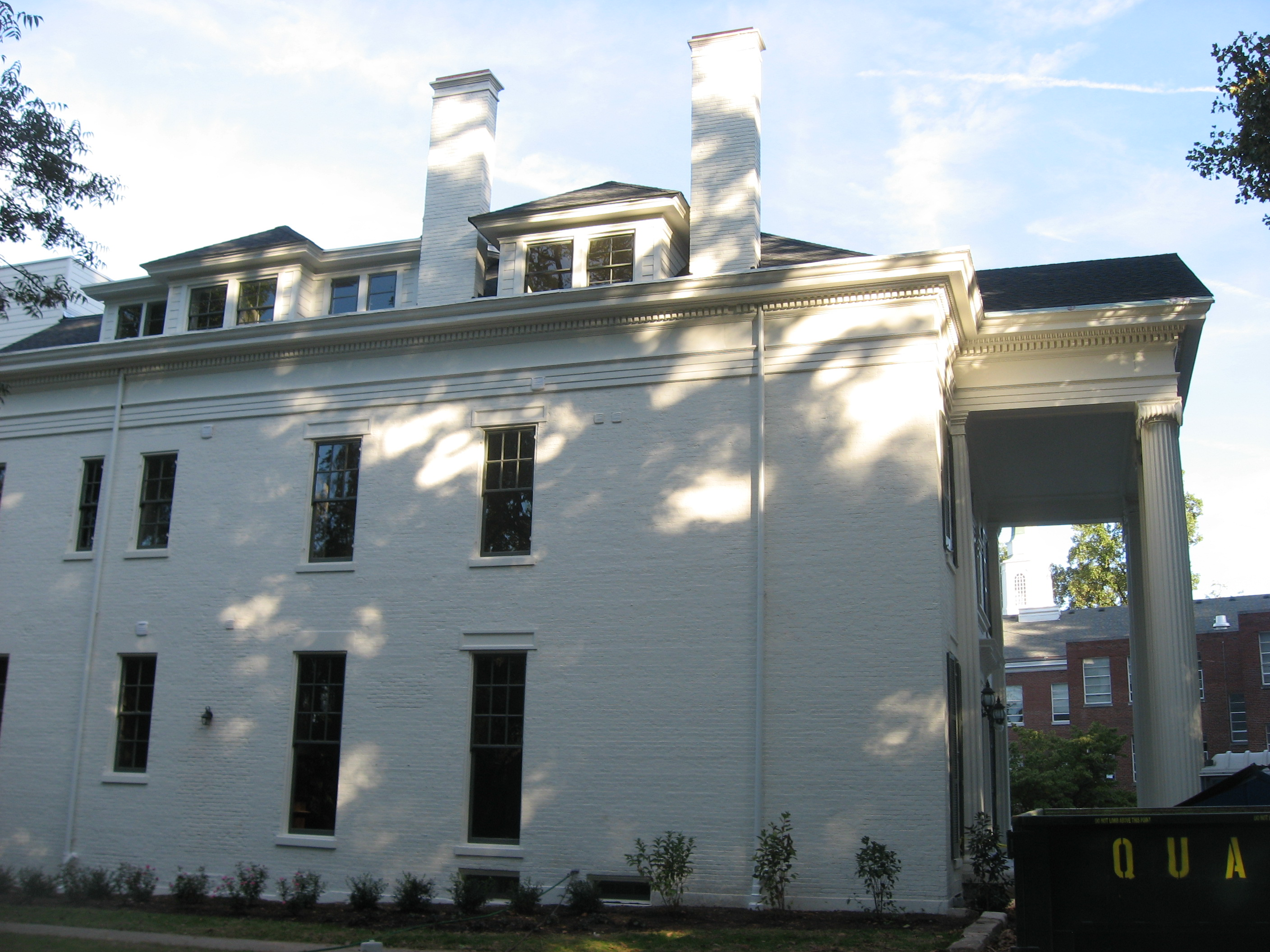
- Woodbourne House, Louisville
- Location: 2024 Woodford Pl., Louisville, Kentucky
- Coordinates: 38°13′33″N 85°41′38″W
- Built: 1850s
- Built by: Stark Fielder
- NRHP reference No.: 08000008
- Added to NRHP: February 7, 2008

Woodbourne House is a Greek Revival historic building in the Highlands-Douglass neighborhood of Louisville, Kentucky that is listed on the National Register of Historic Places. In 1939, the building was purchased by Rugby University School, a private school. The building is now used for apartments for elderly people.

== See also ==
- National Register of Historic Places listings in The Highlands, Louisville, Kentucky
