= Irish Hill, Louisville =

Neighborhood in Louisville, Kentucky

Coordinates: 38°15′03″N 85°43′25″W

Irish Hill is a neighborhood east of downtown Louisville, Kentucky USA. It is bounded by Baxter Avenue to the west, Lexington Road to the north, the middle fork of Beargrass Creek and I-64 to the east. Cave Hill Cemetery is located directly south of Irish Hill. It is in the inner Highlands area of Louisville.

== History ==
Irish Hill was originally known colloquially as Billy Goat Hill after Whalen's goat farm. Anticipating development, the city annexed the area in 1854. Streets were laid out in 1859 by Benjamin Adams and John Hull in an area known as Adams and Hull's Addition. The rest of the community was developed five years later by Ward Payne.

Irish Hill acquired its name because it sits on a ridge above the Ohio River flood plain and was settled by Irish Catholics during the nineteenth century, although many German Catholics settled there as well. A sampling of the 1895 city directory lists the following occupations from Irish Hill occupants: huckster, carpenter, grocer, shoemaker, seamstress, railroad employee, saloon keeper, plumber and stock trader.

During the 1937 flood of Louisville, the waters never came up the hill, so the "pontoon bridge" was located along Baxter at Lexington Road to help people escape from the downtown water. Over 20,000 people passed through Irish Hill before moving onto the Highlands or Crescent Hill. The neighbors of Irish Hill provided food, water and temporary shelter to those in need and frightened during this trying time.

The Irish Hill Neighborhood Association (IHNA) formed in 1976 to address various problems with the neighborhood including abandoned houses. The Association dismantled and was once again reformed in 1996. IHNA has been going strong ever since and has successfully rid the neighborhood of a cell tower and slaughter house. The Association is currently working with a developer on the old scrap yards site located on Lexington Road to ensure that the new development will not involve rerouting Beargrass Creek.

== Features ==
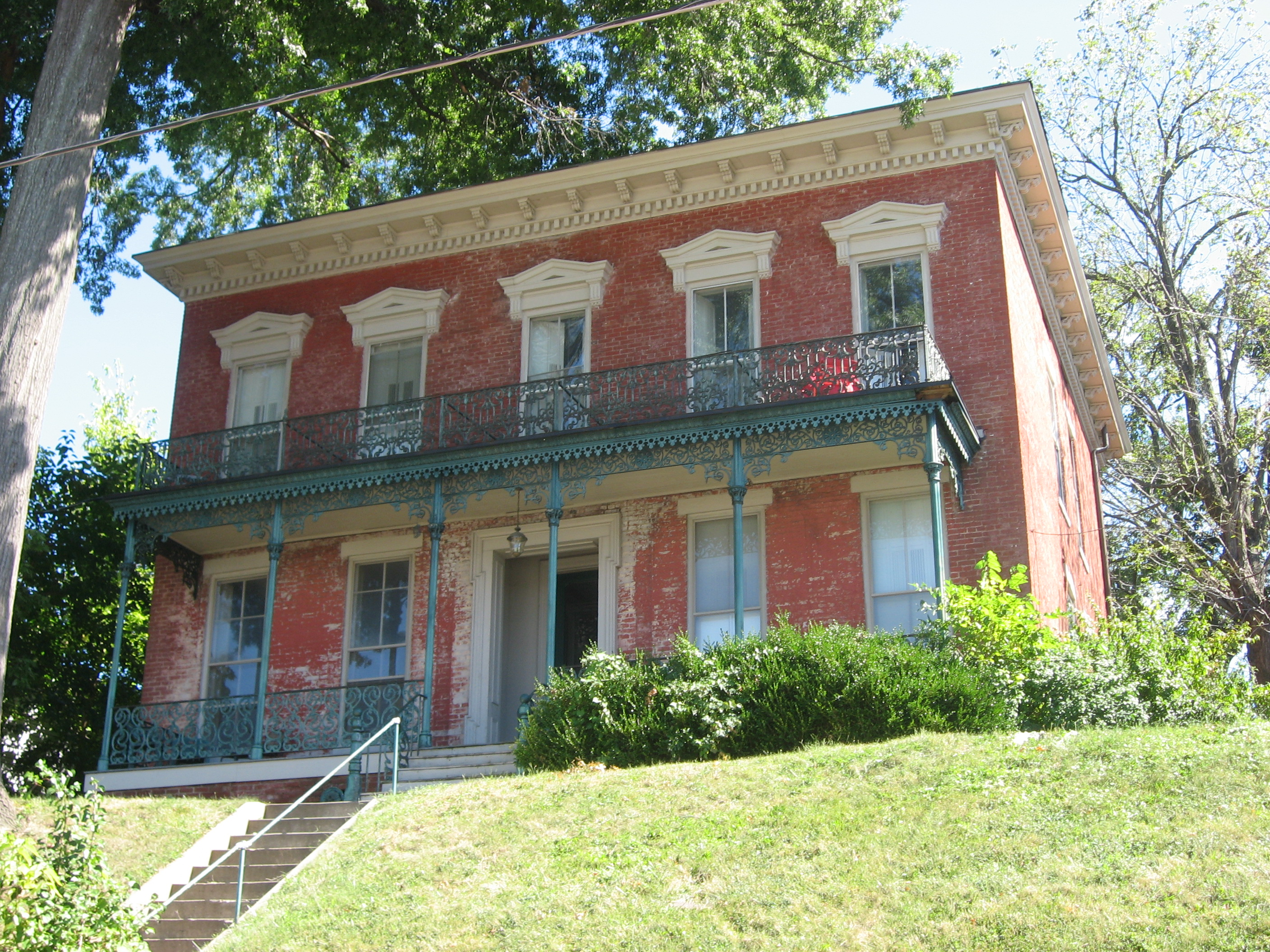
Nicholas Finzer House located in Irish Hill, Louisville

From the 1850s until it was demolished in 1968, the City Workhouse, which housed criminals convicted of minor crimes, was located at Payne and Lexington Streets, across from what is now called Distillery Commons. Breslin Park, a 9.74-acre (39,400 m^{2}) site, was opened on the site of the old City Workhouse in 1974. Distillery Commons was originally the Old Kentucky Distillery which was the largest distillery in the world at its time of operation. Another early business was the Beargrass Slaughter House, but it was primarily a residential neighborhood. Other prominent businesses at the time included: Doll Lumber, Roppel's Grocery, Stottmann's Cafe, Otte's Grocery, Leibert Farm and Seitz's Drugstore.

St. Aloysius Catholic Church and School quickly became the cornerstone of Irish Hill. The church was dedicated on May 3, 1890, to a standing room only crowd. Father Joseph A. O'Grady lead the parish. It is rumored that the "A" for the middle initial of his name stood for Aloysuis, hence the name of the church. In 1996, the Archdiocese of Louisville decide to close the school and church, even though the parishioners and neighbors strongly objected. St. Aloysius will forever remain a part of Irish Hill and the reason why many generations of families have occupied this neighborhood for over one hundred years.

Other than the Shotgun houses, there are several larger historical houses in the area, such as the Valentine Schneikert house and the Nicholas Finzer house, built around 1869 and still the largest house in the neighborhood. Other historic sites are the St. Aloysius church and the old Rogers Street fire house (opened in 1893 and closed in 1977). All of these buildings are on the National Register of Historic Places.

== Breslin Park ==
On May 16, 2012, Mayor Greg Fischer dedicated an array of major improvements and additions costing $500,000 at a revitalized Breslin Park at Lexington Road and Payne Street. The recent improvements produced a total redevelopment of the corner park. Included are a new playground, a new 1,500-square-foot spray-ground, a new multi-use activity field, and a one-third mile walking path around the park, which is roughly 10 acres in size.

== Demographics ==
As of 2000, the population of Irish Hill was 1,456, of which 93.5% are white, 3.2% are black, 1.9% are Hispanic, and 1.7% are listed as other. College graduates are 27.3% of the population, people without a high school degree are 31.6%. Females outnumber males 51.9% to 48.1%
