= Hayfield Dundee, Louisville =

Neighborhood in Louisville, Kentucky

Coordinates: 38°12′36″N 85°41′10″W

Hayfield-Dundee is a neighborhood in eastern Louisville, Kentucky. Its boundaries are Dundee Road, Emerson Avenue, Newburg Road, I-264, and Tremont Drive to the east.

== History ==
Prior to subdivision, much of the land had been part of the Hayfield Farm, owned by Dr. Charles Wilkens Short, a founding professor of the University of Louisville medical school. The area around Gardiner Lane was subdivided in 1944, but most of the neighborhood was developed in the 1950s and 1960s as the Dundee Estates, Clarewood and Dell Lane subdivisions. Many of the houses, especially in the central core of the neighborhood, were built in Historic revival styles.

The south fork of Beargrass Creek runs through the neighborhood. Historically, flooding was not a serious problem, but due to heavy development and the changing nature of the watershed, the creek began to flood in areas where it had not before. After flooding in the early 1960s did hundreds of thousands of dollars in damage to the neighborhood, the Army Corps of Engineers rerouted the creek between Bashford Manor Lane and Bardstown Road in 1966.

=== Annexation movement ===
Atherton High School has been located in the neighborhood since the 1960s. The neighborhood's proximity to the school was a draw for families that moved to the neighborhood after subdivision. At a time when the Louisville and Jefferson County Boards of Education had not yet merged, a unique agreement allowed parents in the neighborhood to send their children to the nearby city school while technically living in the county school district, as the neighborhood had not been annexed by Louisville.

In 1969, due to rising attendance, this agreement was revoked, which led to an unprecedented and unusual grassroots lobbying effort by residents to have the area annexed by the city. The housewife lobbyists, known as the "Dames of Dundee", went to Frankfort and offered baked goods to legislators on a daily basis. They were eventually successful in getting an annexation referendum on the ballot in the November 1970 election, which succeeded, but the law was struck down by the Kentucky Court of Appeals in 1971. By this time, the lobbyists leader, Gerta Bendl, had been elected to the Louisville Board of Aldermen, and finally succeeded in allowing residents of Hayfield Dundee and surrounding neighborhoods to attend Atherton in 1973.
