= Bullock-Clifton House =

Historic house in Kentucky, United States

- U.S. National Register of Historic Places
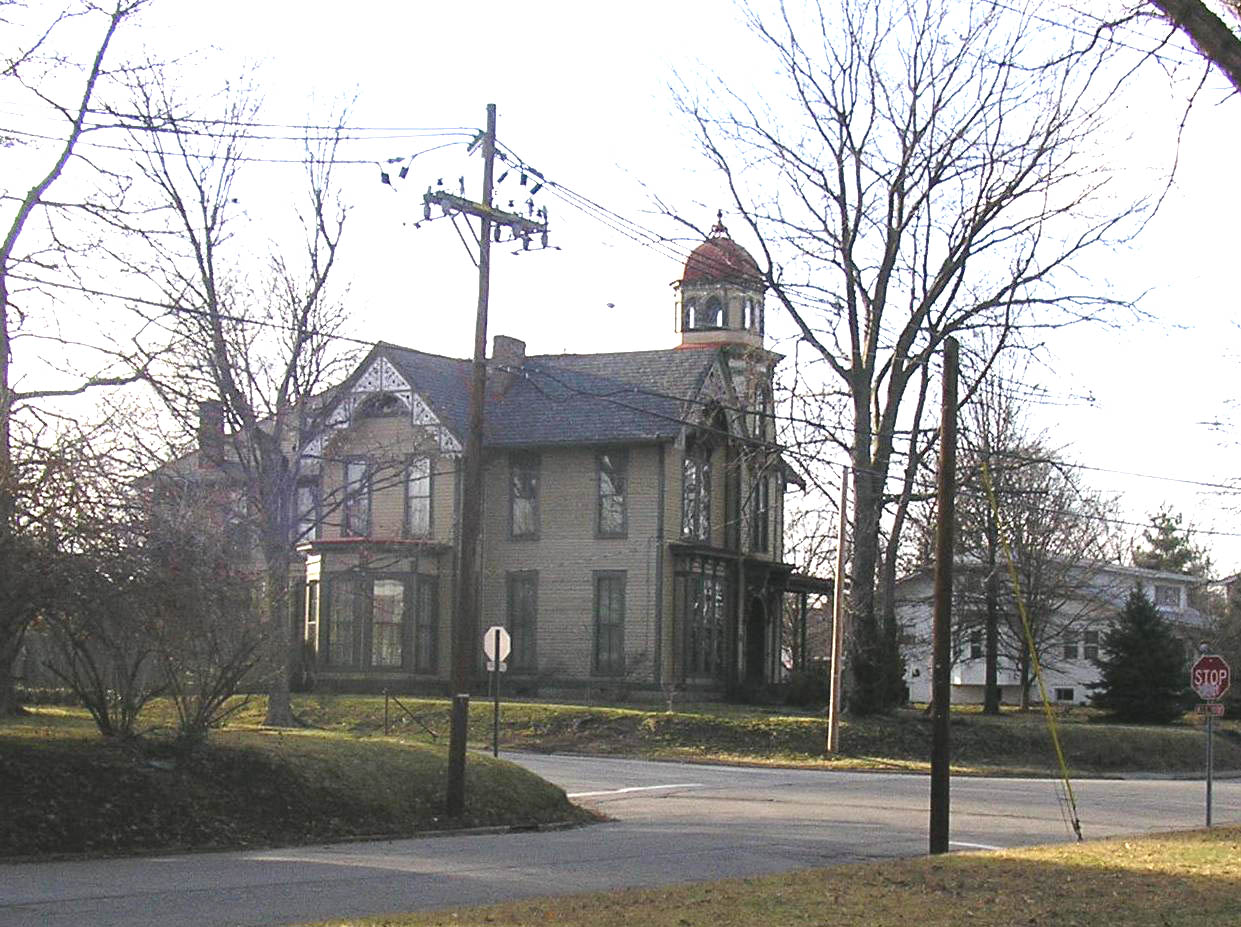
- Streetside view of the house

- Location within Kentucky Location within the United States
- Location: 1824 Rosedale Ave., Louisville, Kentucky
- Coordinates: 38°13′27″N 85°42′15″W
- Area: less than one acre
- Built: 1834
- Architectural style: Mixed (multiple styles from different periods)
- NRHP reference No.: 82002707
- Added to NRHP: May 6, 1982

The Bullock-Clifton House is a historic home in the Deer Park neighborhood of Louisville, Kentucky, United States. It is the oldest known surviving wood-frame structure in Jefferson County. It was listed on the National Register of Historic Places in 1982.

== History ==
The house was built as a manor house for the surrounding farm, which was a 30-acre (120,000 m^{2}) truck farm by the early 20th century. The house was built in two sections, typical of a farmhouse of its age. The first was built in 1834 in the Federal style, facing northward towards the Ohio River. This reflected the early rural nature of the area, before the Bardstown Turnpike, a quarter mile to the east, was nothing more than an unpaved trail. In 1873, the Federal facade was removed along with the eastern portion of the house when the signature Italianate/Eastlake facade was built facing east towards the Bardstown Turnpike, which was by this time the focal point of the area.

The older portion of the house was built by William Bullock, a politician, judge and philanthropist. As a member of the Kentucky General Assembly Bullock introduced legislation to establish what became the public school system in Kentucky. His most important achievement as a politician was securing an endowment for the Kentucky School for the Blind in 1841. In 1834, he purchased 79 acres (320,000 m^{2}) of land from William Pope and constructed the house.

Bullock sold the property in 1839 to Francis Thornton, a minister.

== Features ==
The front, newer, portion of the house is 2½ stories high, with a distinctive octagonal tower rising up for a fourth level cupola.

== See also ==
- National Register of Historic Places listings in The Highlands, Louisville, Kentucky
