= Cave Hill Cemetery =

Historic cemetery in Jefferson County, Kentucky

- U.S. National Register of Historic Places
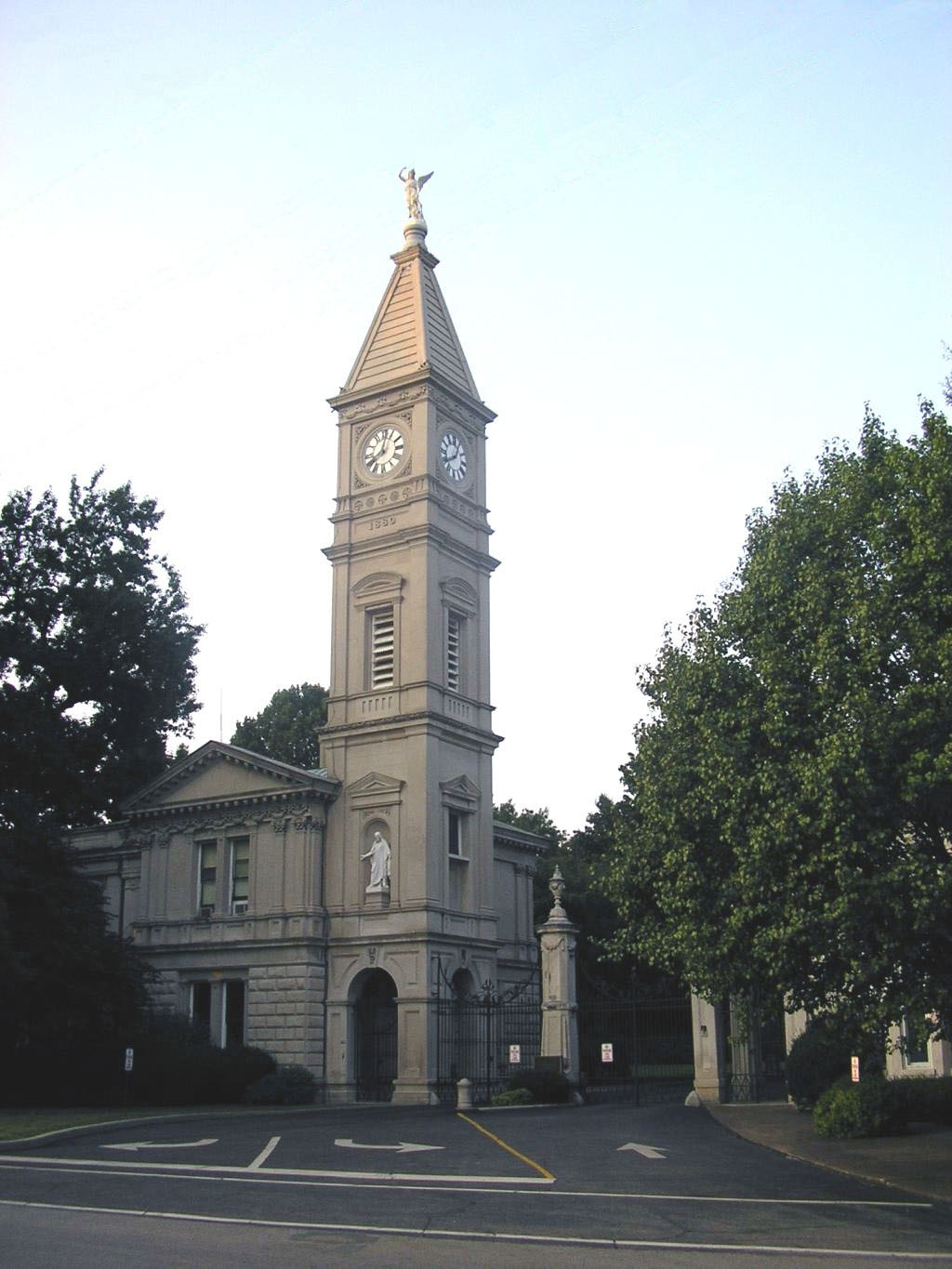
- Main entrance on Baxter Avenue
- Interactive map of Cave Hill Cemetery
- Location: 701 Baxter Avenue; Louisville, Kentucky
- Coordinates: 38.2456°N 85.7161°W
- Area: 296 acres (1.20 km^{2})
- Built: 1848–1913
- Architectural style: Corinthian, Victorian
- Website: cavehillcemetery.com
- NRHP reference No.: 79000999
- Added to NRHP: 1979

Cave Hill Cemetery is a 296-acre (1.20 km^{2}) Victorian era National Cemetery and arboretum located at Louisville, Kentucky. Its main entrance is on Baxter Avenue and there is a secondary one on Grinstead Drive. It is the largest cemetery by area and number of burials in Louisville.

Cave Hill was listed on the National Register of Historic Places in 1979. Cave Hill National Cemetery, containing military graves, is also on the National Register, added in 1998.

== History ==
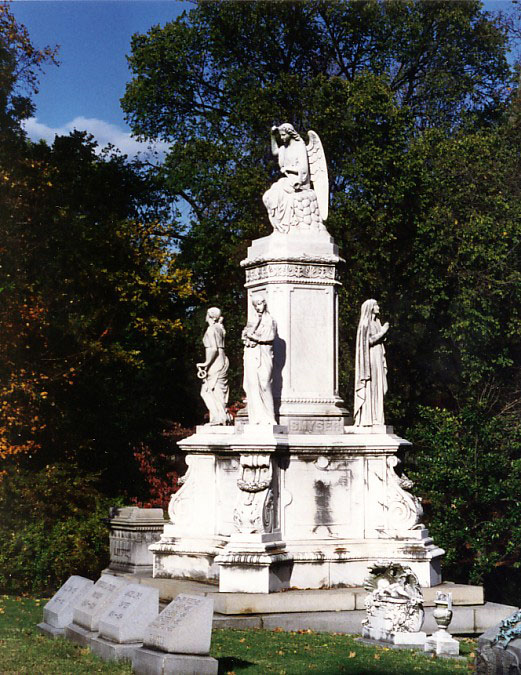
Smyser Memorial

Chartered in 1848, Cave Hill was logged for construction on what was William Johnston's Cave Hill Farm, a rural property some distance east of Louisville. Johnston, who died in 1798, had built the first brick house in Louisville on the grounds circa 1788. City officials had purchased part of the land in the 1830s in anticipation of building a railroad through it and a workhouse was built there. The railroad was built elsewhere, and the land was leased to local farmers.

In 1846, Mayor Frederick A. Kaye began investigating the possibility of developing a rural or garden-style cemetery on the grounds. While rural cemeteries were an extremely popular style at the time, utilizing natural topography to build an "untouched, rural" environment, Cave Hill was not initially laid out to be a rural cemetery. It was when Hartford, Connecticut civil engineer Edmund Francis Lee was hired that the plan changed: Lee saw the "undulating hills, promontories, and basins as perfectly suited for landscaping the rural aesthetic." The Cave Hill Cemetery Co. was chartered in February 1848, and the cemetery was dedicated on July 25, 1848. Reverend Doctor Edward Porter Humphrey delivered the dedicatory address and elaborated on the idea of the garden cemetery, noting, among other things, that ". . .Reason and taste suggest that [this cemetery] should be decorated appropriately by the beautiful productions of our great Creator. . ."

Before the era of large municipal parks, it was common for cities to promote a garden cemetery as a green oasis and recreation destination, and Louisville was no exception. Leading up to Cave Hill's formal dedication on July 25, 1848, the Louisville Daily Courier promoted this idea with multiple articles singing the praises of rural cemeteries. Wrote the Courier, "ladies and gentlemen of the city, visit these grounds on the day of consecration, and see the beauties of the place." This movement simmered with the opening of nearby Cherokee Park in 1892. After administrators sold several acres of land for the burial of Union soldiers during the Civil War, local Confederate supporters purchased nearby land as well. Several deceased patients from the Brown General Hospital and other nearby army medical facilities were interred in Cave Hill Cemetery.

Johnston's farmhouse (in what is now sections 33 and 34) was converted to the city's pesthouse, and was demolished in 1872. Also in 1872, Beechhurst Sanitarium was built near the pesthouse and the modern Grinstead entrance. Beechurst was torn down in 1936.

The entrance lodge and main gates were designed by Louisville architect William H. Reddin in 1880 in the style of Italian Renaissance Revival.

The grounds were expanded and remapped in 1888 to their modern size of nearly 300 acres (1.2 km^{2}). In the 1980s, razor wire was added to the brick walls surrounding Cave Hill to keep out after-hours visitors.

The first scenic overlook for the cemetery, Twin Lakes Scenic Overlook, opened on August 20, 2008.

== Entrances, buildings and memorials ==
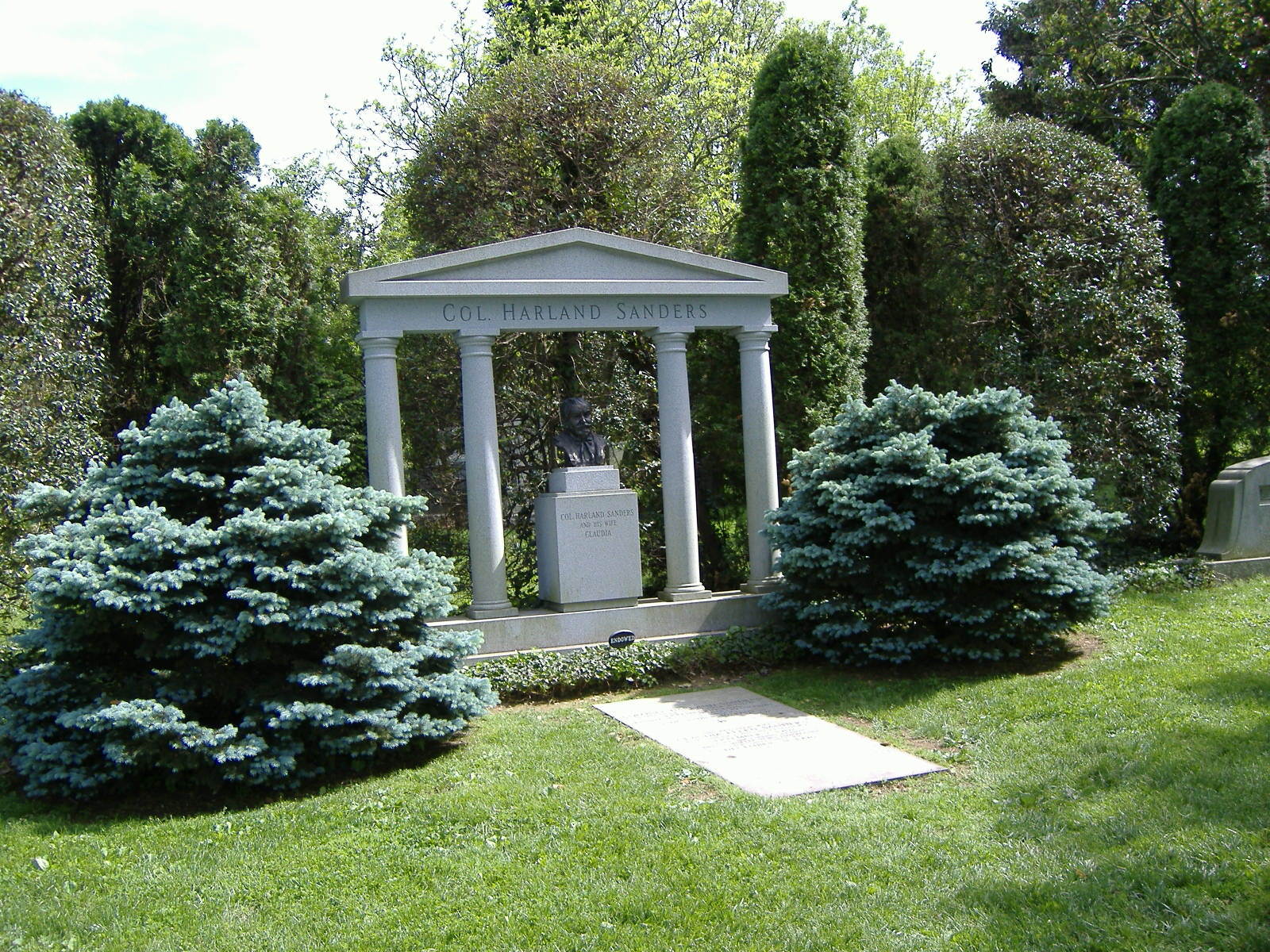
Colonel Sanders' gravesite

The signature Baxter Avenue entrance, called the "Broadway Entrance" by the cemetery, was completed in 1892. The Corinthian-style building includes a 2,000-pound (910 kg) bell in its clock tower. The tower, once the tallest structure for miles, was frequently hit by lightning and last renovated in 2001.

The Grinstead Drive entrance was built in 1913. The third public entrance on the residential street of Dearing Court was closed as of 2007. Another public entrance, also no longer in use, was built off Payne Street in 1910, closest to the military sections. There are several service entrances around the perimeter.

Other buildings include the stone office building near the lake, and the Rustic Shelter House built in 1892 at a cost of $565.

The cemetery contains monuments and graves of three Union army generals. The 32nd Indiana Monument, also known as the August Bloedner Monument, is separately on the National Register.

== Beargrass Creek, cave ==
The middle fork of Beargrass Creek runs through Cave Hill, and a source stream flowing into the creek roughly divides the cemetery in the new (eastern) and old (western) sections. That stream flows from a spring near the cave that gave the property its name. The cave can be entered for about 30 feet (9.1 m), and then there is a marginal amount of crawl space beyond that, however the cave is officially off limits. There are also five man-made lakes.

== Trees, arboretum ==
The cemetery currently features more than 500 species of trees and shrubs, including some two dozen current state champion trees, including both native species as the pignut hickory (Carya glabra) and exotics as the Caucasian wingnut (Pterocarya fraxinifolia). The grounds are recognized as an arboretum.

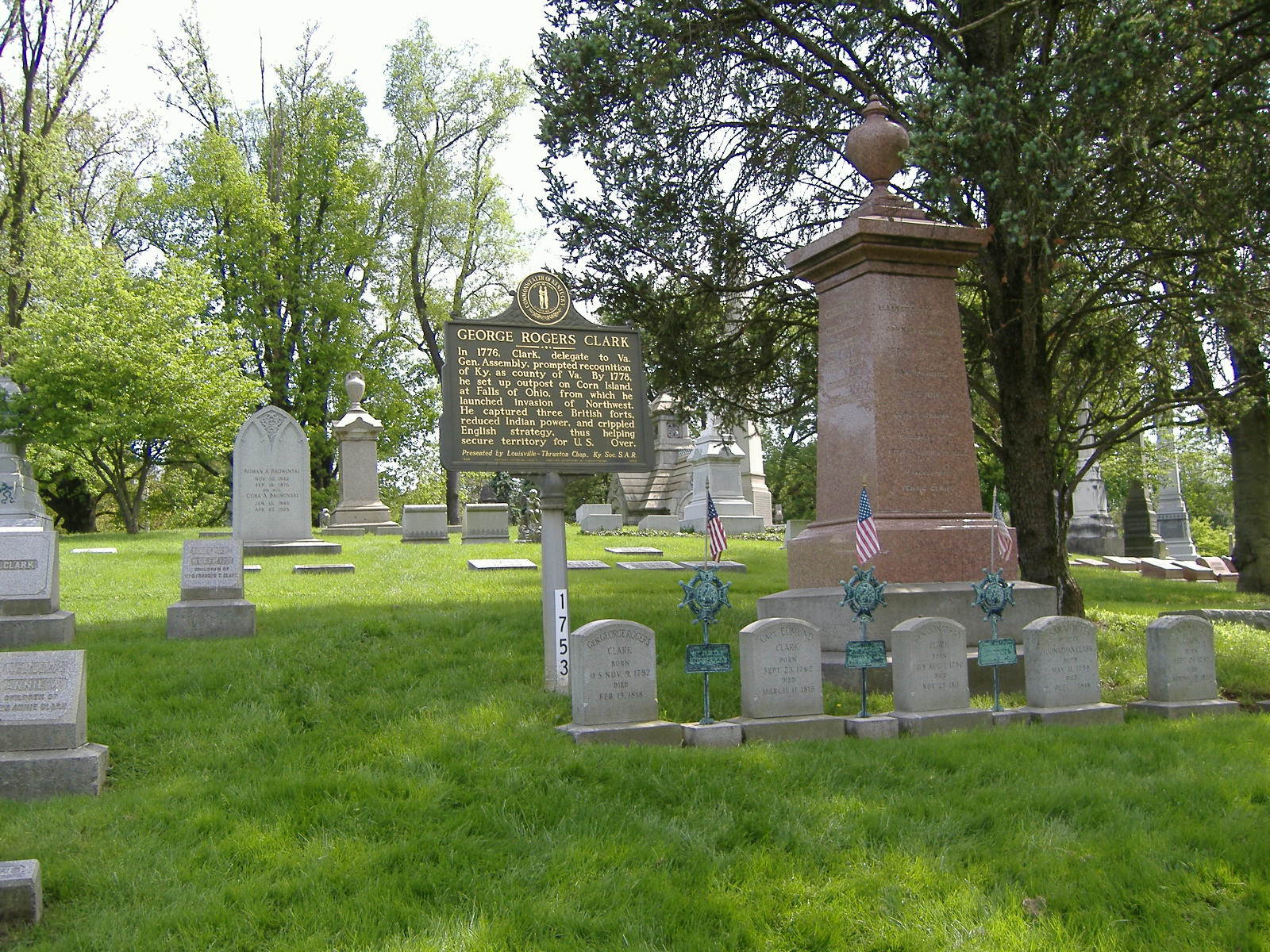
George Rogers Clark gravesite

== Interments ==
There were about 120,000 people interred by 2002, with space remaining for 22,000 more graves. Notable among those interred in the cemetery is American Revolutionary War military war officer and founder of Louisville George Rogers Clark (1752–1818).

More than 200 Confederate soldiers are buried in Section "O" of the cemetery, with 30–40 buried in a row near the National Cemetery. The original wooden markers in Section "O" were replaced with stone markers in 1880–1881. A number of markers are marked as unknown. Included in the Section "O" burials is a Confederate Brigadier General, Alpheus Baker. There are two other Confederate generals buried in other locations in the cemetery. In the addition to Section "O" (lot 267½) are a number of residents of the Kentucky Confederate Home, who died around the start of the 20th century. The confederate flag flies over the area.

Within another U.S. Soldiers plot in Section E is one British war grave, of a soldier of the Machine Gun Corps, a member of the British Military Mission to the United States, who died in 1918.

Portrait painter and cousin of Mark Twain, Mary Ann Xantippe "Tip" Saunders, was interred at Cave Hill Cemetery in 1922. Patty Hill and Mildred J. Hill (sisters), composers of the Happy Birthday song, are interred here. Muhammad Ali, boxing champion born in Louisville, was interred on June 10, 2016. Also interred are the founder of Kentucky Fried Chicken, Colonel Harland Sanders; American suffragist and campaigner Margaret Weissinger Castleman; and Mia Zapata, lead singer of punk band The Gits. Paul Hornung, Heisman Trophy winner and Green Bay Packer, was interred in 2020.

== Gallery ==
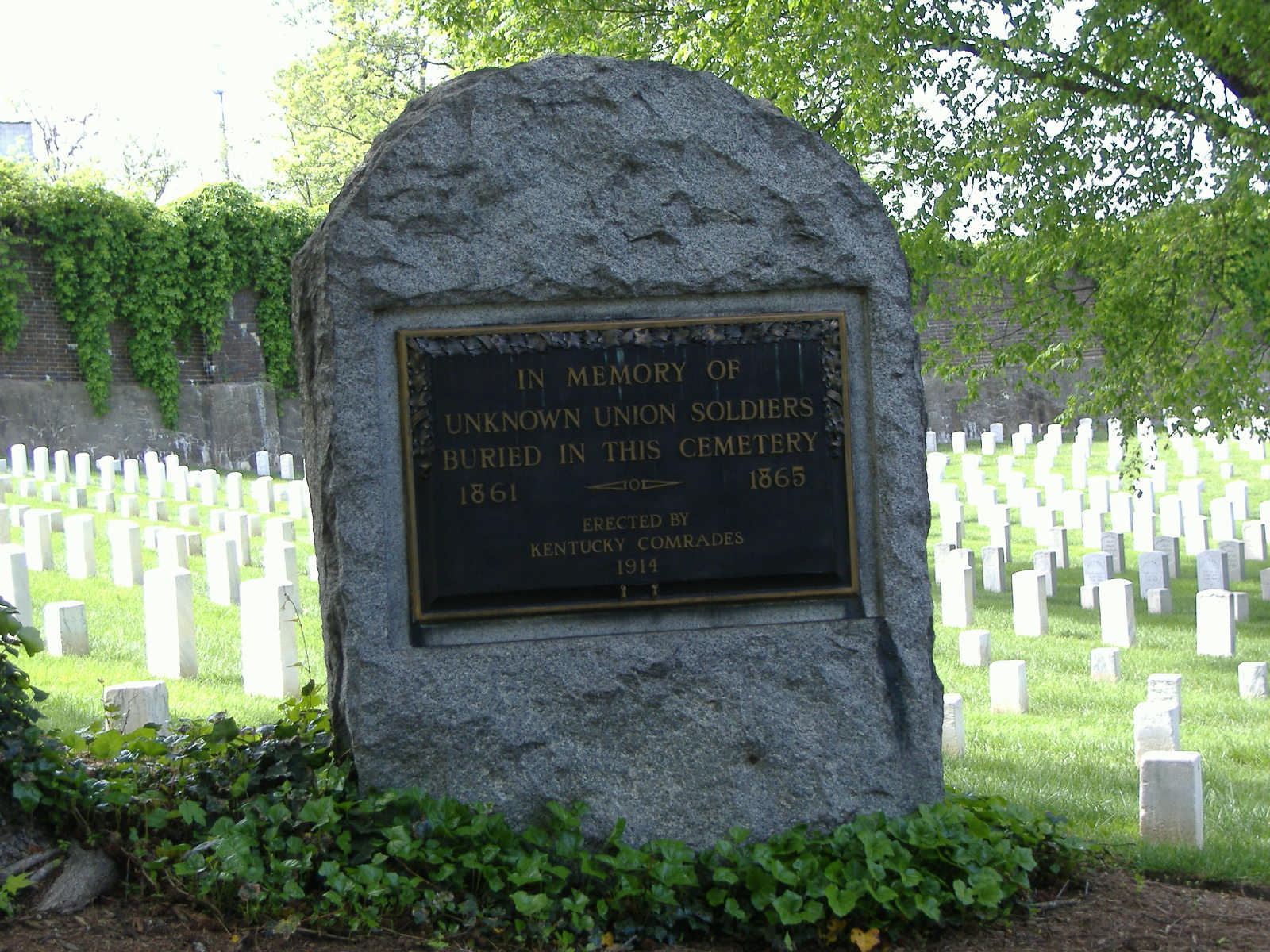
Union Monument in Louisville

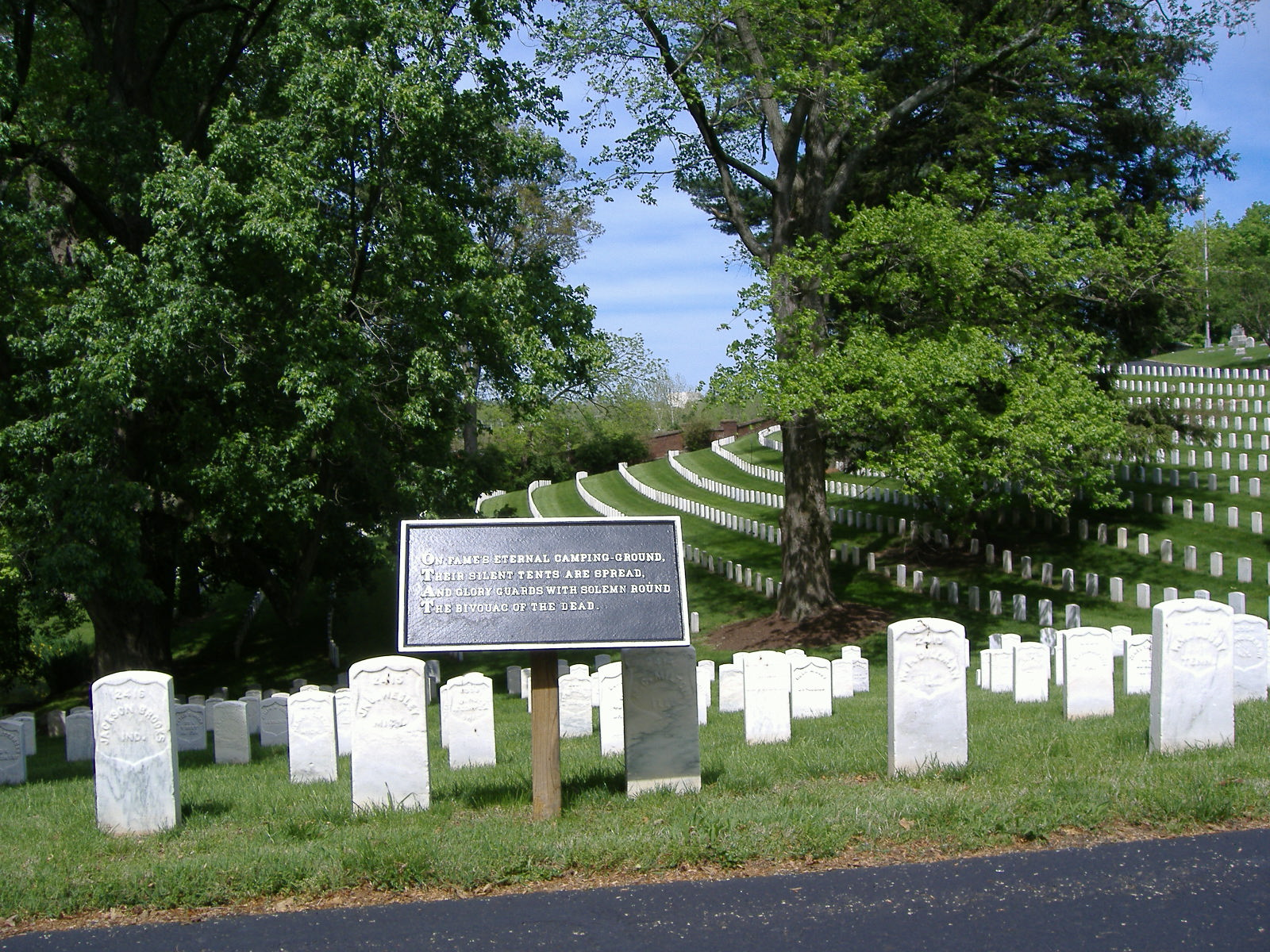
Plaque quoting the poem "Bivouac of the Dead"

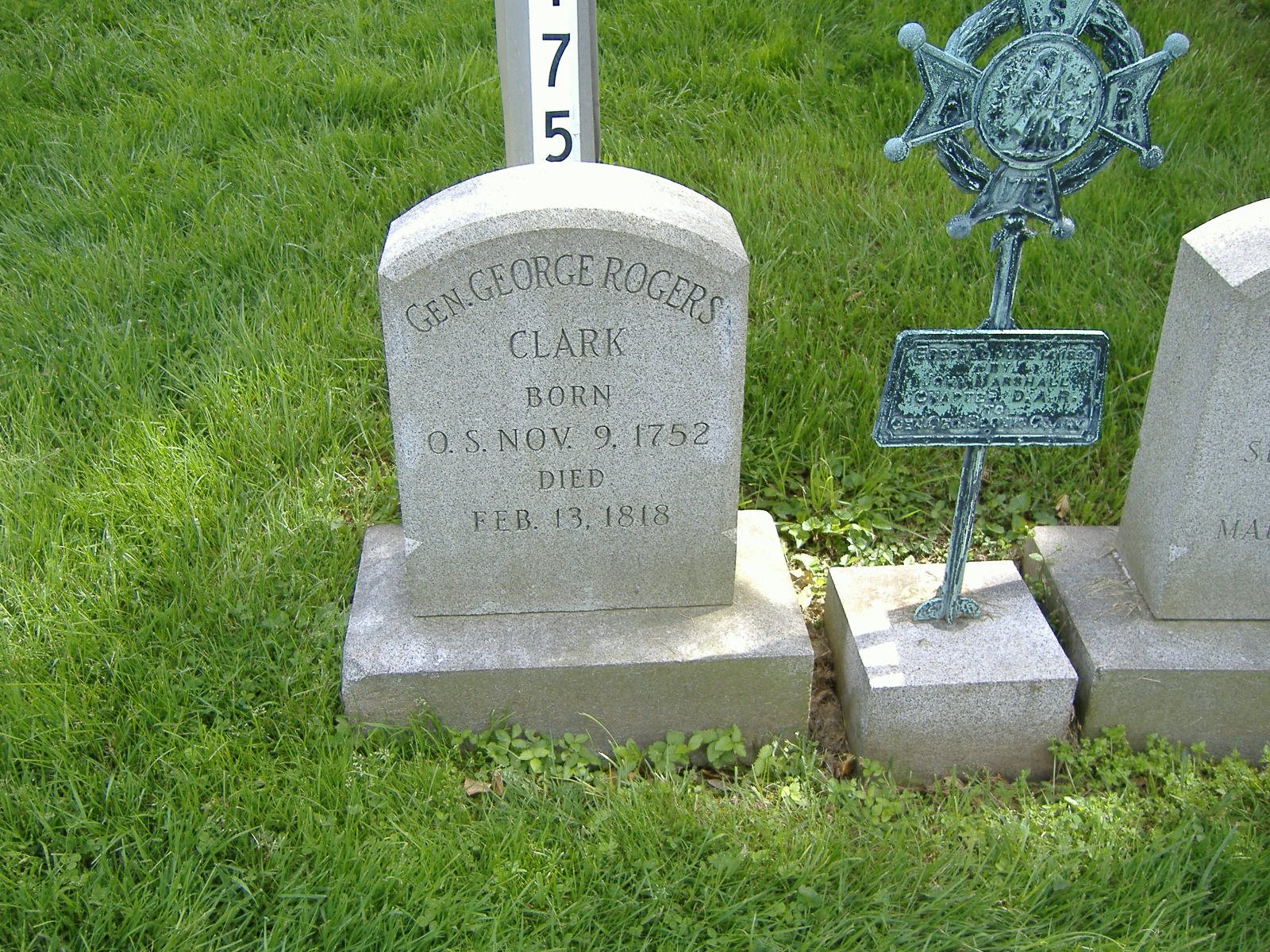
George Rogers Clark gravestone

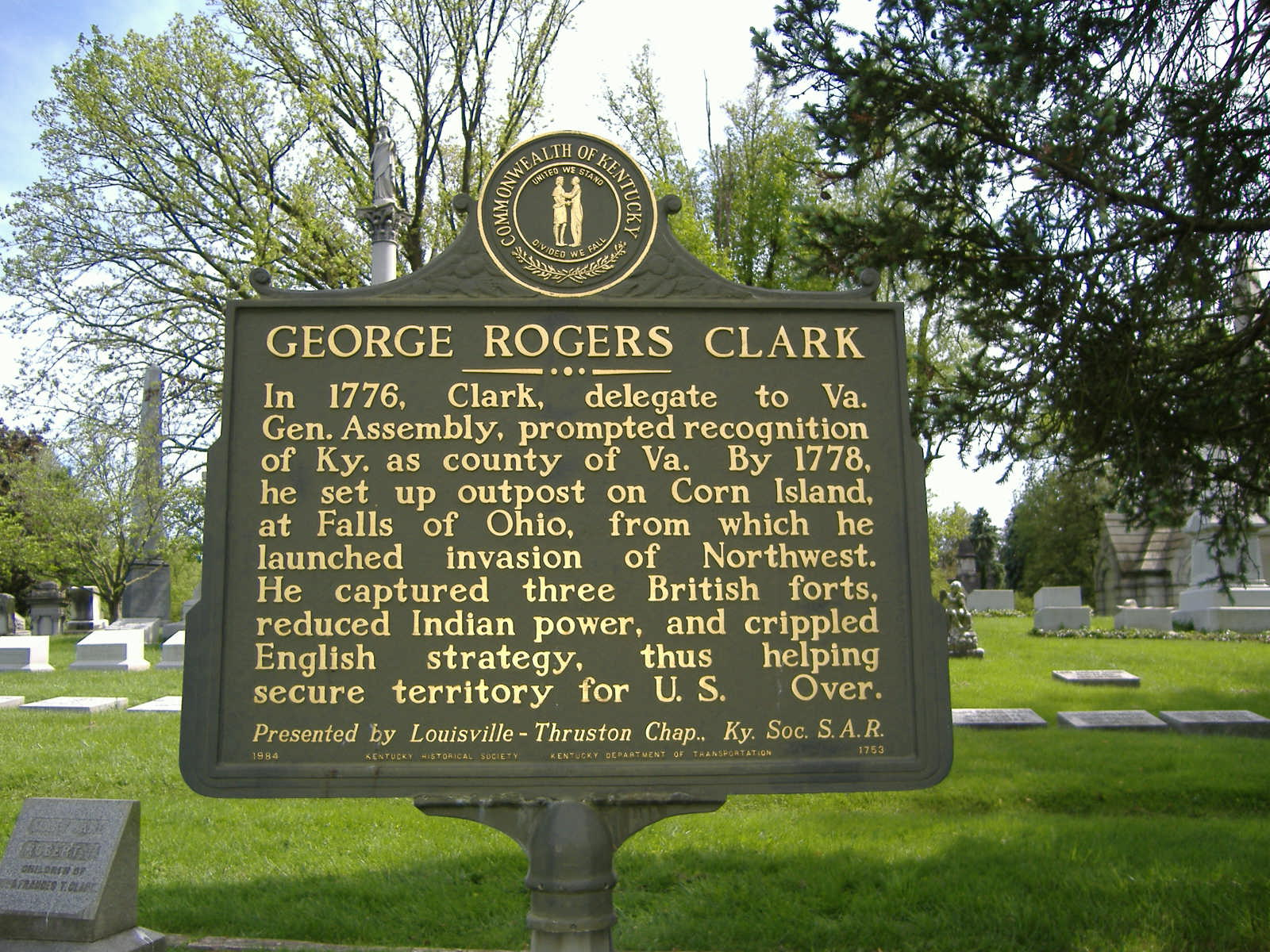
George Rogers Clark marker

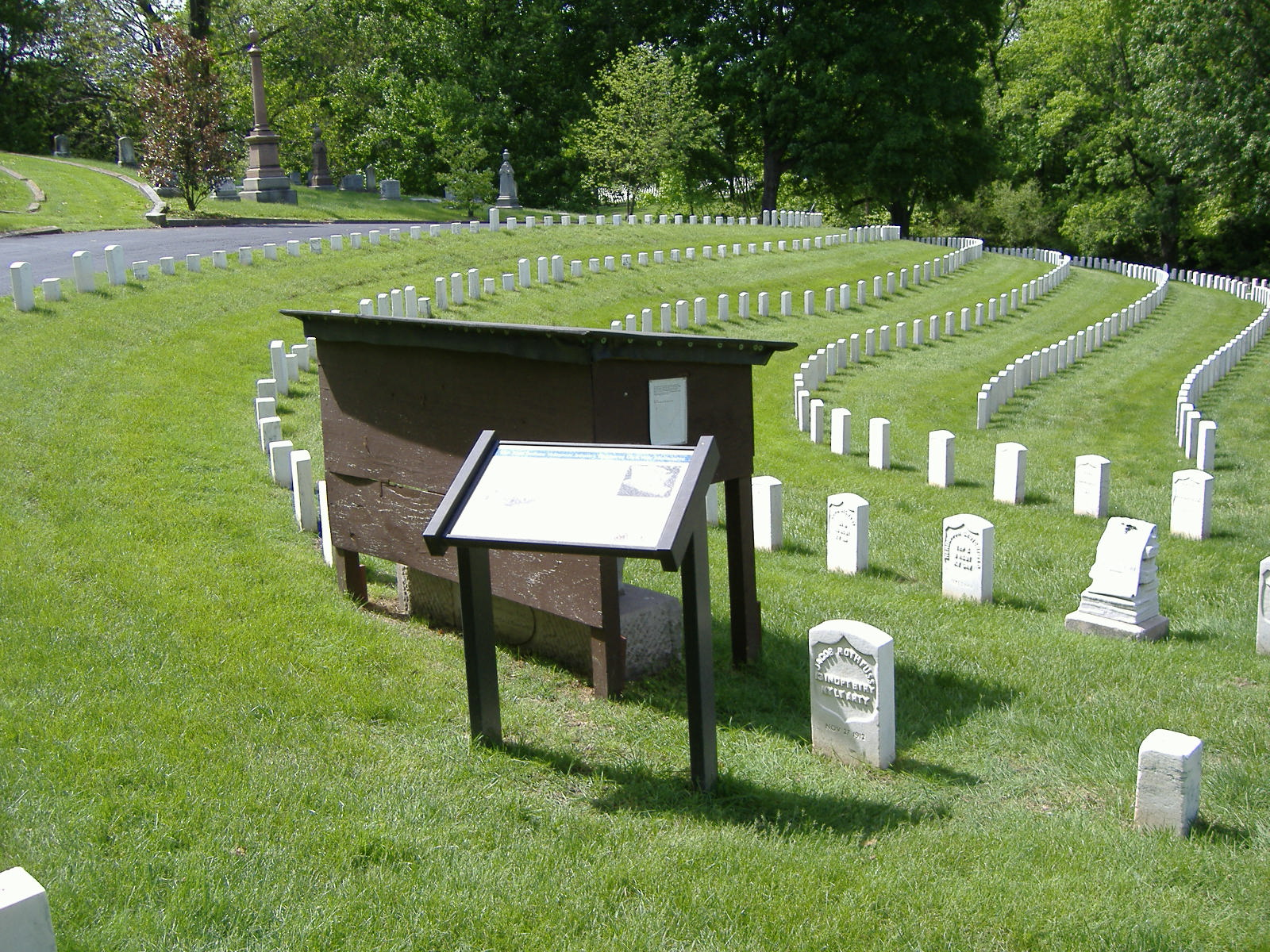
The 32nd Indiana Monument

== Documents ==
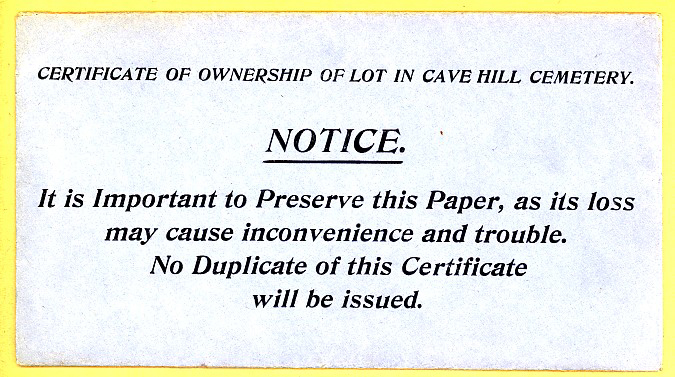

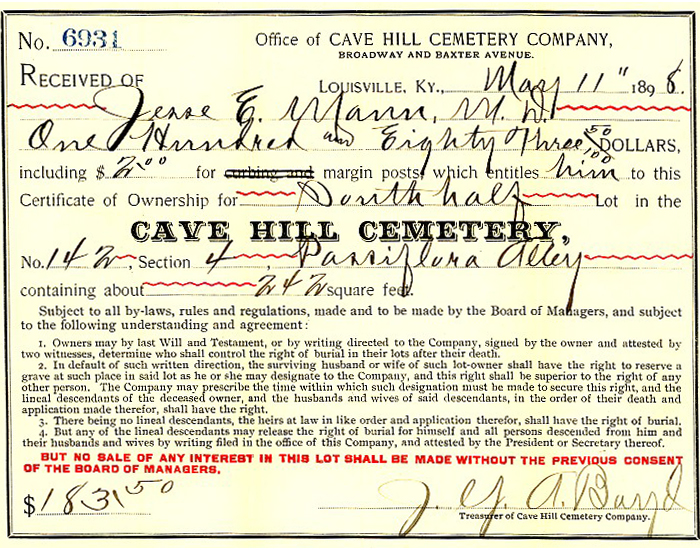

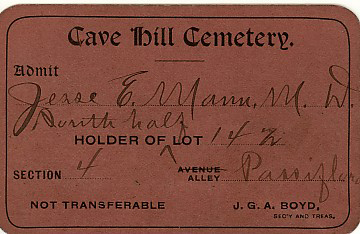

== See also ==
- Eastern Cemetery (Louisville)
- History of Louisville, Kentucky
- List of attractions and events in the Louisville metropolitan area
- List of botanical gardens and arboretums in the United States
- List of burial places of justices of the Supreme Court of the United States
- List of mayors of Louisville, Kentucky
- Louisville in the American Civil War
- National Register of Historic Places listings in The Highlands, Louisville, Kentucky
