= Hawthorne, Louisville =

Neighborhood in Louisville, Kentucky

Coordinates: 38°13′11″N 85°39′52″W

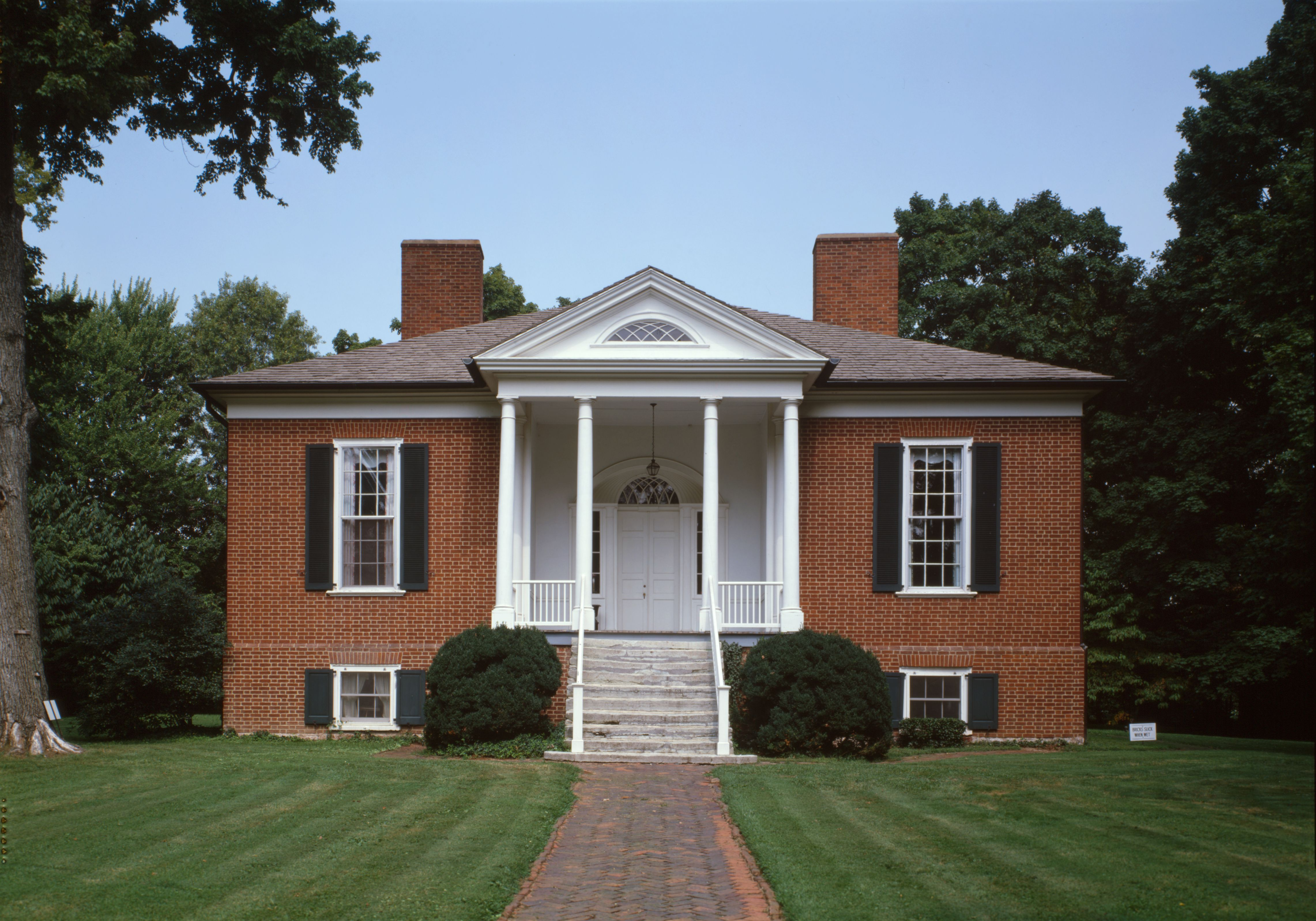
Farmington house viewed from front

Hawthorne is a neighborhood in eastern Louisville, Kentucky, United States. Its boundaries are Taylorsville Road, Hawthorne Avenue, Bardstown Road and I-264. The land was once part of John Speed's Farmington estate, known for its plantation house built around 1815–16. The neighborhood is primarily residential and was first subdivided in 1909, but saw its fastest grown in the 1920s. It takes its name from Hawthorne Avenue, and most of the other streets are named after writers or poets. Sullivan University is located in the neighborhood.

Hawthorne surrounds the small city of Wellington, Kentucky.
