= Saint Francis of Assisi Complex =

Historic church in Kentucky, United States

- U.S. National Register of Historic Places
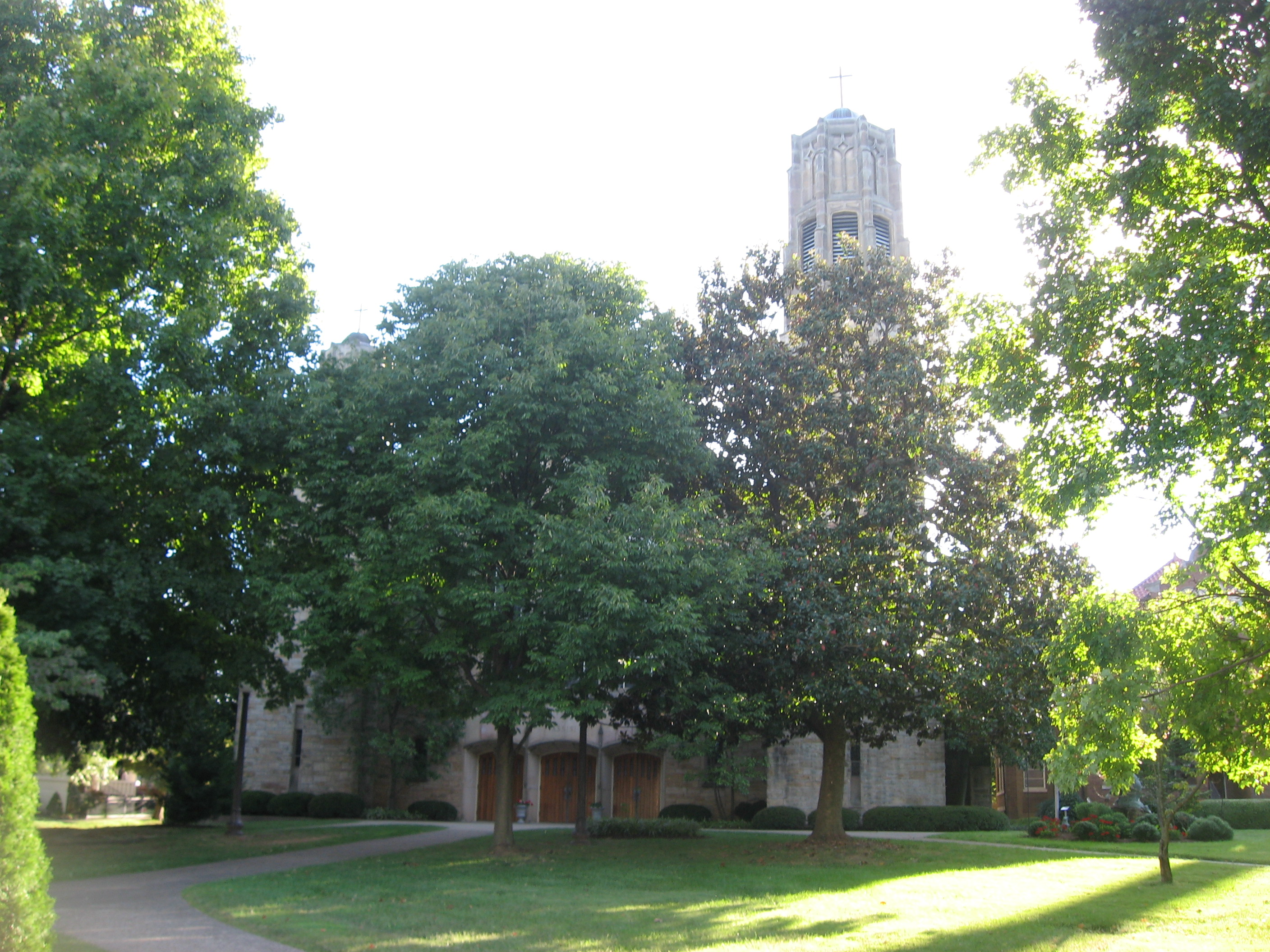

- Location within Kentucky Location within the United States
- Location: 1960 Bardstown Rd., Louisville, Kentucky
- Coordinates: 38°13′33″N 85°41′52″W
- Area: less than one acre
- Built: 1926–28
- Architect: Erhart, Fred T.
- Architectural style: Mission/Spanish Revival, Spanish Mission style
- NRHP reference No.: 87000850
- Added to NRHP: May 29, 1987

The Saint Francis of Assisi Complex in Louisville, Kentucky is a historic church at 1960 Bardstown Road. It was built in 1926–28 and added to the National Register of Historic Places in 1987.

It includes the St. Francis of Assisi School and a rectory, both designed by Fred T. Erhart (1870–1951).

The school was deemed "an outstanding example of the Spanish Mission style and one of very few of this type constructed in the Louisville area."
