= Tyler Park, Louisville =

Neighborhood of Louisville, Kentucky

Coordinates: 38.23090°N 85.71660°W

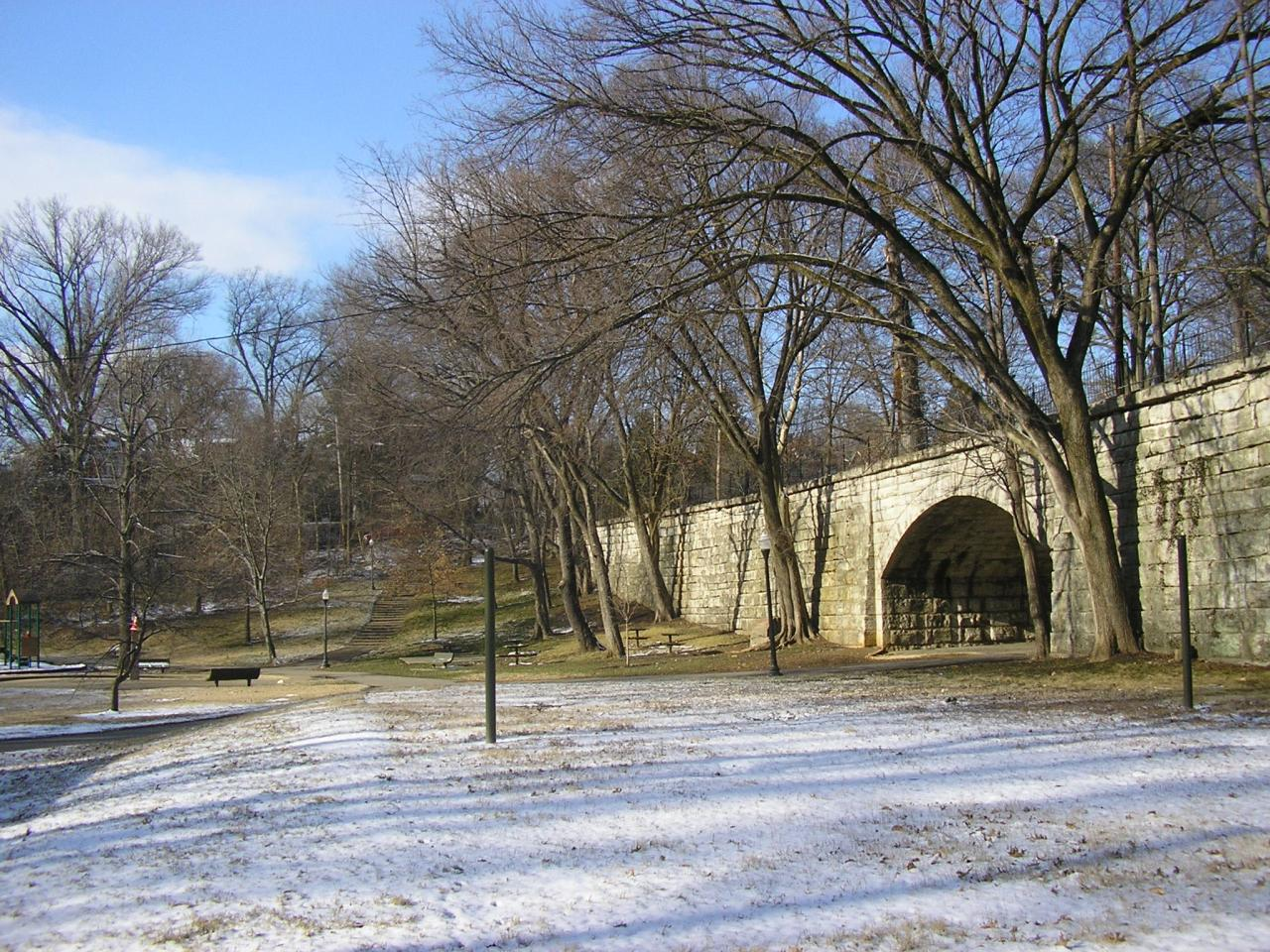
Tyler Park Bridge in winter

Tyler Park is a neighborhood three miles (5 km) southeast of downtown Louisville, Kentucky, USA. It is considered a part of a larger area of Louisville called The Highlands. Near the middle of the neighborhood is a city park of the same name, and many houses in the neighborhood feature park views. The neighborhood boundaries are St Louis Cemetery to the north, Bardstown Road to the east, Eastern Parkway to the south and Beargrass Creek to the west.

== History ==
The first subdivision was laid out in 1873 by John H. Tucker between Baxter Avenue, Bardstown Road, Edenside Avenue, and about where Windsor Place would later be. However, because of its relatively remote location from downtown, development did not pick up until the 1880s. All early subdivisions were in the eastern section of the area, near Bardstown Road and away from the steep hills to the west. The extension of a streetcar line down Bardstown Road to Bonnycastle Avenue and the establishment of nearby Cherokee Park created demand around this time for housing in the area.

The last subdivision built in this part was Windsor Place in 1910, which was unusually strict, requiring all houses built there to sell for over $8,000 and have exteriors only of brick, stucco or stone. Utilities and wires were located in the alleys, to allow for an unobstructed view along the maple-lined street.

Further west, the sections between St. Louis and Calvary cemeteries were developed starting in 1907. The upper section was done by Edward A. Goddard, who lent his name to a street. The lower hilly section was developed by John Breckinridge Castleman, a former Confederate army major and leader in creating Louisville's park system. He began purchasing the 60-acre (240,000 m^{2}) area, known as Schwartz's Woods, in the 1870s, intending to build a personal estate there, but realized this would be impractical as the city expanded around the land. He saw that there were relatively strict deed restrictions on the lots, including 35-foot (11 m) setbacks, prohibition of wood fences, a minimum cost of $6,000 for houses, and all structures on lots had to be built under one roof.

=== Tyler Park and Bridge ===
A city park was opened in 1910, named Tyler Park after mayor Henry S. Tyler who died during his term in 1896. This park would in turn lend its name to the surrounding neighborhood. One of the defining features of both the park and the neighborhood is the Tyler Park Bridge, built in 1904 (renamed after the opening of the park). Built of Indiana limestone, the bridge allowed Baxter Avenue to span the valley north of Eastern Parkway that would become Tyler Park. The design is attributed to John Olmsted (son of Frederick Law Olmsted) and incorporates a large arched tunnel that allows pedestrians to freely walk from one part of the park to the other without crossing the busy street that bisects Tyler Park.

In 2018-2020 the park underwent renovations funded by support from donors to an Olmsted Parks Conservancy's fundraising campaign, Louisville Parks and Recreation, Louisville Metro Government, Mayor Greg Fischer, Councilman Brandon Coan (District 8), and local residents fundraising efforts. The renovations included repairing and resurfacing two of the historic tennis courts, removing the old playground and replacing it with more modern play equipment (including a splash pad), adding in public bathrooms, new benches, lighting and replacing the tunnel's stairs with a wheelchair and stroller-friendly ramp. As of Dec 19, 2020, the following proposed planned renovations have not been completed: repairing and resurfacing two to four other tennis courts and creating two pickleball courts.

== Demographics ==
As of 2000, the population of Tyler Park was 2,867, of whom 91.9% are white, 3.9% are black, 3% are listed as other, and 1.2% are Hispanic. College graduates comprise 51.4% of the population, while people without a high school diploma make up 10.6%. Females outnumber males 52.2% to 47.8%.

== See also ==
- Forecastle Festival, held in Tyler Park 2002–2004
