= Rose Hill (Louisville, Kentucky) =

Historic house in Kentucky, United States

- U.S. National Register of Historic Places
- Location within Kentucky Location within the United States
- Location: 1835 Hampden Ct., Louisville, Kentucky
- Coordinates: 38°13′42″N 85°41′54″W
- Area: 0.4 acres (0.16 ha)
- Built: 1852
- Architectural style: Italianate
- NRHP reference No.: 80001616
- Added to NRHP: December 03, 1980

Rose Hill is an antebellum house in Louisville, Kentucky. It was added to the National Register of Historic Places in 1980.

It is located about three miles (5 km) from Downtown Louisville in the Douglass neighborhood of Louisville's Highlands area. It is located just off Bardstown Road.

== Architecture ==
The two-story brick house is built in the Italianate style, with a square main block topped by a cupola. A two-story rear section extends back from the main block, forming a "T". The main facade is symmetric. Its formal, symmetrical design is unusual for Louisville.

== History ==
Rose Hill was built in 1852 for Emory Low, a Louisville dry goods merchant born in Leominster, Massachusetts in 1808. At one time he owned an entire block of Louisville's Main Street. While Rose Hill was still under construction, Low was killed when an outhouse wall collapsed on him. The house was in flux while his estate was settled, and his widow did not live there until 1867.

The house was built on a 23-acre (93,000 m^{2}) parcel of land Low owned, which was a part of an original military land grant to William Pope. The land around Rose Hill was subdivided in 1908 and it is amid a residential neighborhood.

Rose Hill was owned by the Seelbach family in the 1940s, but fell into disrepair from the late 1950s until 1975, when it became home to a graphic design firm.

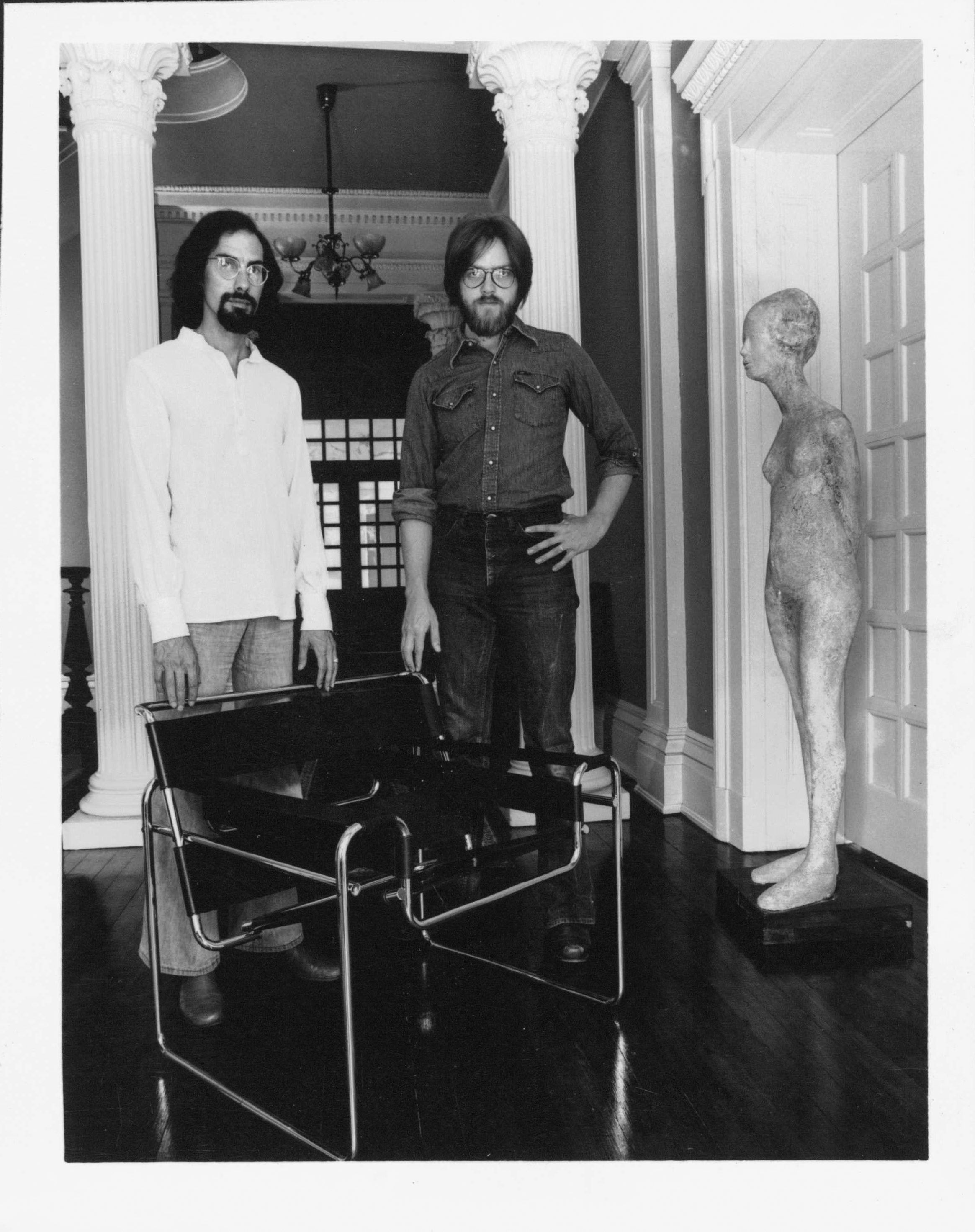
Designers, Julius Friedman and Nathan Felde, in the entry hall of their studio and residences, in 1979.
