= Bonnycastle, Louisville =

Neighborhood in Louisville, Kentucky

Coordinates: 38°14′00″N 85°42′02″W

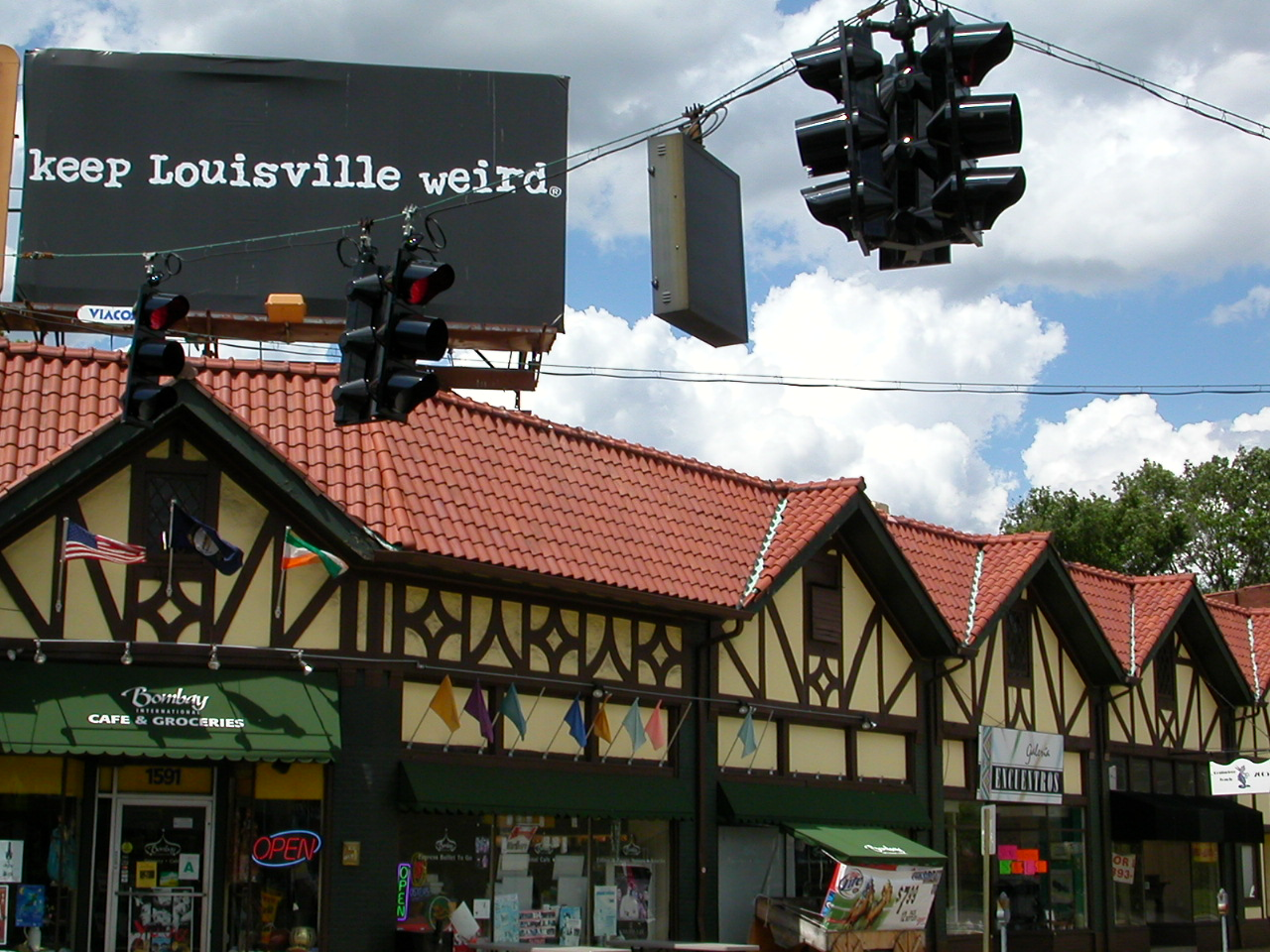
Intersection of Bardstown Road and Bonnycastle

Bonnycastle is a neighborhood four miles (6 km) southeast of downtown Louisville, Kentucky USA. It is considered a part of a larger area of Louisville called The Highlands. Its boundaries are Bardstown Road, Cherokee Road, Eastern Parkway and Speed Avenue.

== History ==
In 1848, merchant Isaac Everett purchased a 158-acre (0.64 km^{2}) farm from the Angereau Gray family. He built a mansion house there in 1863 and called the estate Walnut Grove. His daughter, Harriet, married John Bonnycastle, to whom he gave the estate upon his death. The couple moved into the mansion in 1868 and raised nine children. The family began subdividing land on present day Sherwood Avenue in 1872, though widespread development didn't begin until Cherokee Park was opened and a street car line moved out Bardstown Road to the area in the 1890s. The southern portion was subdivided after Mr. Bonnycastle's death and was named "Bonnycastle's Addition" in his honor. Some of the land also went to enlarge Cherokee Park. The original mansion house is still standing, now called the Everett/Bonnycastle Mansion.

Most of the neighborhood was developed by 1912, but one remaining parcel was a 12-acre (49,000 m^{2}) bell-shaped tract, the site of the original mansion, which had been converted to a school. The parcel was developed in the late 1940s and early 1950s as a signature feature of the neighborhood. The Spring Drive mansions, recognizable by their 200-foot (61 m) front yards, are perched atop large hills. One of Louisville's most famous Derby parties - the Barnstable Brown Party – is held at a home on Spring Drive.

Closer to the park, along Cherokee, Casselberry and Sulgrave Roads, strict deed restrictions encouraged larger houses. While encouraging upscale housing, the original deed restrictions banned foreigners or children of foreigners from owning houses on these streets, and included such provisions as a ban on hanging laundry on Sundays. The neighborhood also has a carless pedestrian court, Edgewood Place.

=== Influence from Cherokee Park ===
The neighborhood's development was strongly influenced by its proximity to Cherokee Park. There is a relatively narrow range of architectural styles in Bonnycastle, due to the short period of time it was developed. Ten of its 15 subdivisions were built between 1890 and 1914. These portions of the neighborhood display a mix of Victorian and historical revival styles, as well as scattered Craftsman bungalows. Developed in 1928 was the tallest building in the neighborhood, the Commodore Apartment Building, which list listed on the National Register of Historic Places.

== Demographics ==
As of 2000, the population of Bonnycastle was 4,200, of which 96.9% are white, 2% are Hispanic, 1% are listed as other, and 0.1% are black. College graduates are 51.7% of the population, people without a diploma or equivalent are 7%. Females outnumber males 52.8% to 47.2%
