= Highlands–Douglass, Louisville =

Highlands–Douglass
- Louisville neighborhood
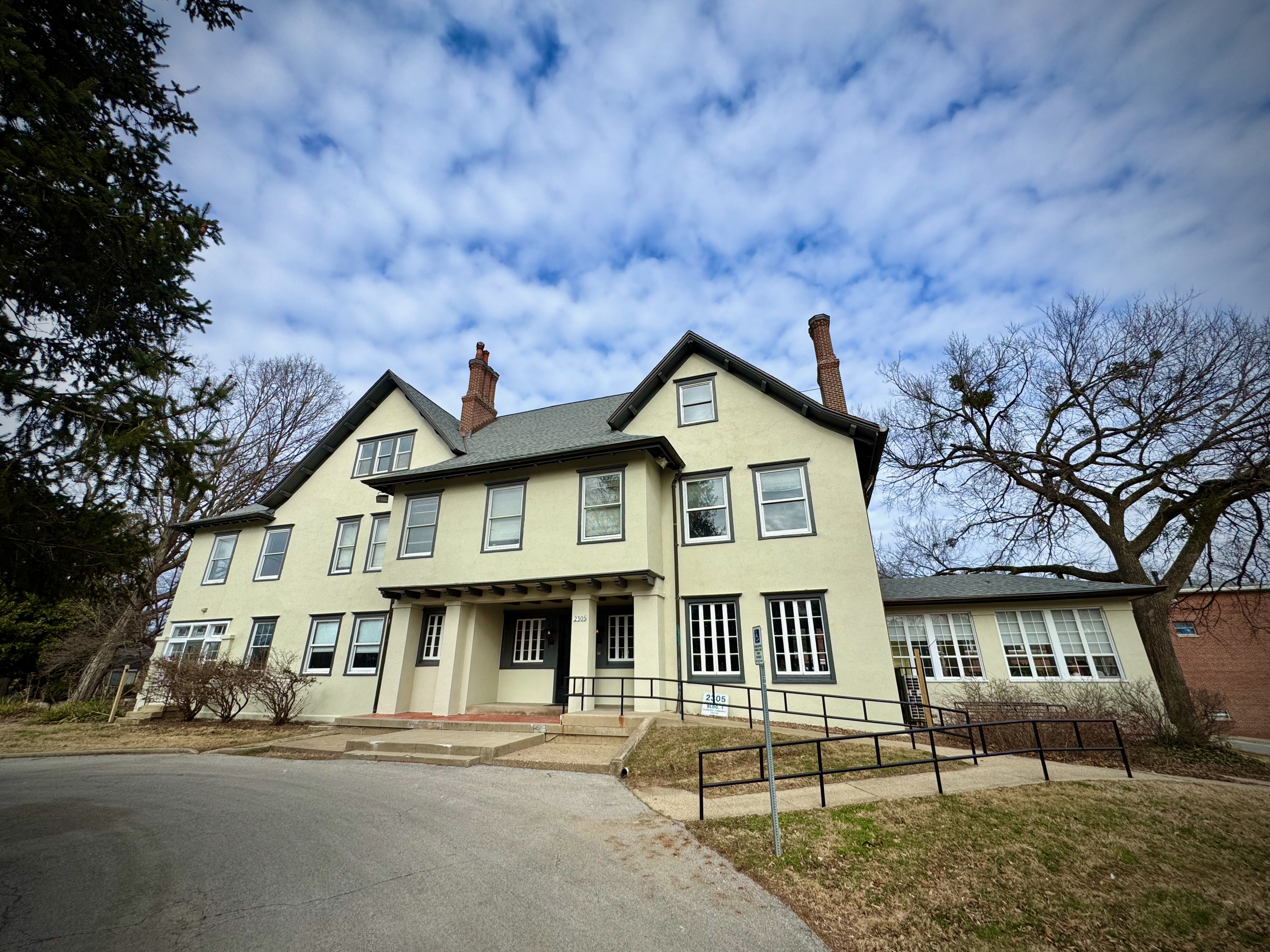
- Douglass Community Center, built in 1907, is a fixture in the heart of the Douglass neighborhood.
- Interactive map of Highlands–Douglass
- Coordinates: 38°13′44″N 85°41′08″W
- Country: United States
- State: Kentucky
- City: Louisville

Government
  - Council Member: Ben Reno-Weber

Area
  - Total: 0.644 sq mi (1.67 km^{2})

Population (2010)
  - Total: 3,136
  - Density: 4,870/sq mi (1,880/km^{2})
- ZIP code(s): 40205
- Area code(s): 502
- Website: www.highlandsdouglass.org

Highlands–Douglass is a neighborhood five miles (8 km) southeast of downtown Louisville, Kentucky, United States. The neighborhood is bound by Bardstown Road, Speed Avenue, Taylorsville Road, and Cherokee Park. It is considered a part of a larger area of Louisville called The Highlands. It is often simply called Douglass.

== History ==
=== Pre-subdivision ===
The area was originally part of a 200-acre (0.81 km^{2}) estate belonging to Mississippi plantation owner Stark Fielding. It was referred to as the "Woodbourne Estate." In 1870, the land was bought by then Western Union president George Douglass, for whom the area is named. The distinctive estate home still stands, located behind Douglass Boulevard Christian Church. The large white-columned Southern Colonial mansion was originally built by Fielding in the 1830s, and from the 1930s until 1949 was Rugby University School, an exclusive boy's preparatory school. The church has owned the house since 1949 and uses it for offices and meeting space.

After George Douglass died, the land passed to his daughter. The area was subdivided and developed after the opening of Cherokee Park, to which the family donated several acres in exchange for the right to connect subdivisions to the park. Part of the Douglass donation included "Big Rock", one of the more popular spots in the park.

Another antebellum home, Rose Hill, is found on Hampden Court a short distance from Bardstown Road. The imposing two-story Italianate mansion is distinguished by its central bell tower. Rose Hill was built in 1852 for Emory Low, a Louisville dry goods merchant born in Leominster, Massachusetts in 1808. It was added to the National Register of Historic Places in 1980.

=== Neighborhood development ===
In 1912, a streetcar line was extended down Bardstown Road to Douglass Boulevard, where it "looped" around and went back toward downtown. Most houses in Highlands–Douglass were built in the 1920s, as undeveloped land closer to the Original Highlands became nonexistent and the "outer Highlands" became popular.

However, due to the great depression, development in the eastern portion of the neighborhood slowed greatly, and would not be completed until 1952. This stopping and starting of development explains the mixture of scattered historical revival and craftsmen houses - typical of the early 20th century - with mid-century ranch-style houses along Valletta, Moyle Hill and Millvale roads in particular.

North of Douglass, in portions built in the boom years of the 1920s, the heavily upper-middle class subdivisions were stocked with houses built in Historical Revival styles. Colonial, Tudor, English and Dutch Revival styles are dominant. South of Woodbourne, homes are somewhat more modest brick and frame bungalows.

== Demographics ==
As of 2017, the population of Douglass Loop was 3,034, of which 94% are white, 3% are black, 2% are Asian, and 1% are Hispanic. Females outnumber males 53% to 47%.
