= Commodore Apartment Building (Louisville, Kentucky) =

- U.S. National Register of Historic Places
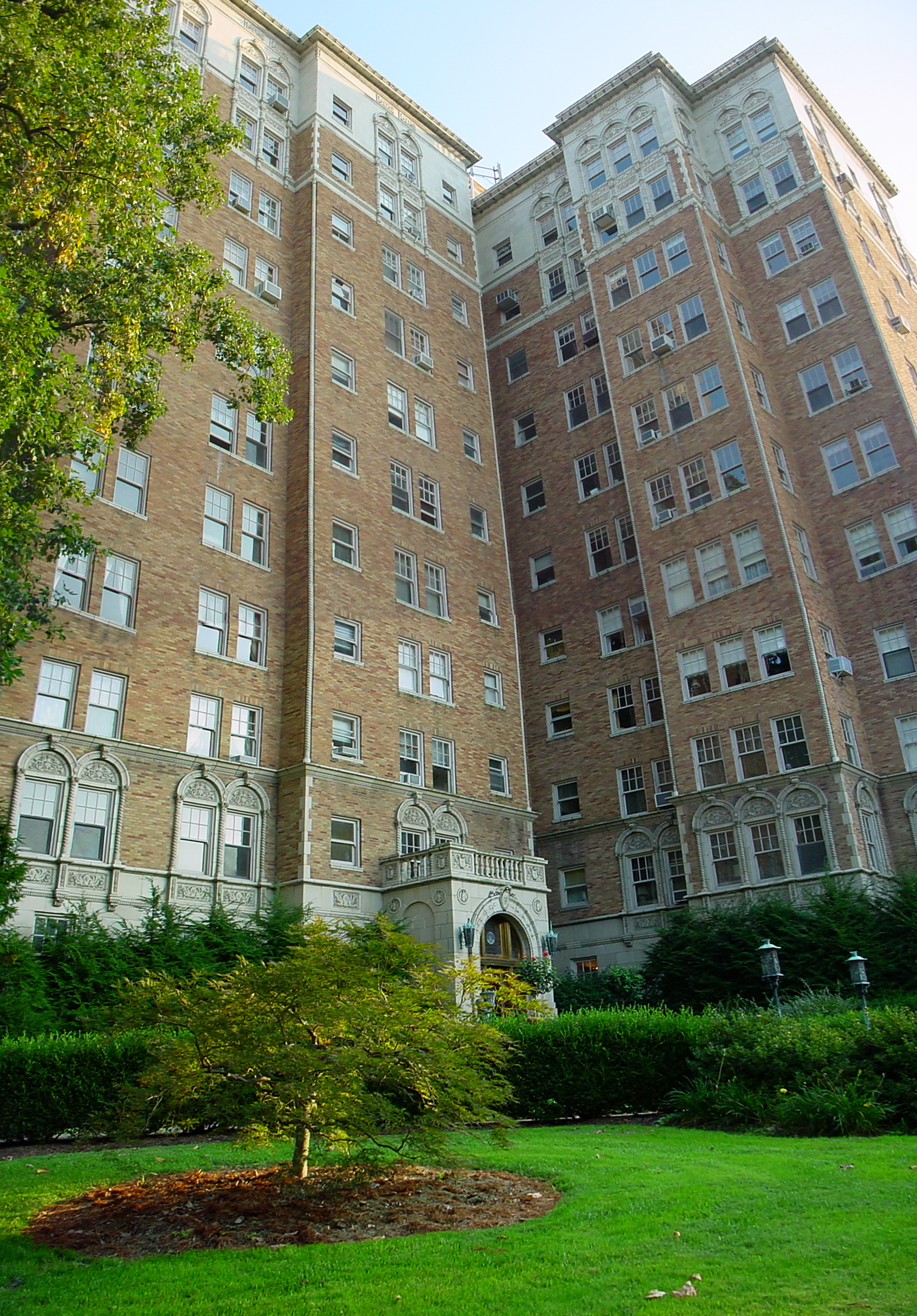
- Front entrance

- Location within Kentucky Location within the United States
- Location: Bonnycastle; Louisville, Kentucky
- Coordinates: 38°13′57.5″N 85°42′2.5″W
- Built: 1929
- Architect: Joseph & Joseph
- Architectural style: Late 19th And 20th Century Revival
- NRHP reference No.: 82002709
- Added to NRHP: April 29, 1982

The Commodore Apartment Building, also called Commodore Apartments, is a luxury condominium complex located in Louisville, Kentucky's Bonnycastle neighborhood. The building is listed on the National Register of Historic Places.

== History ==
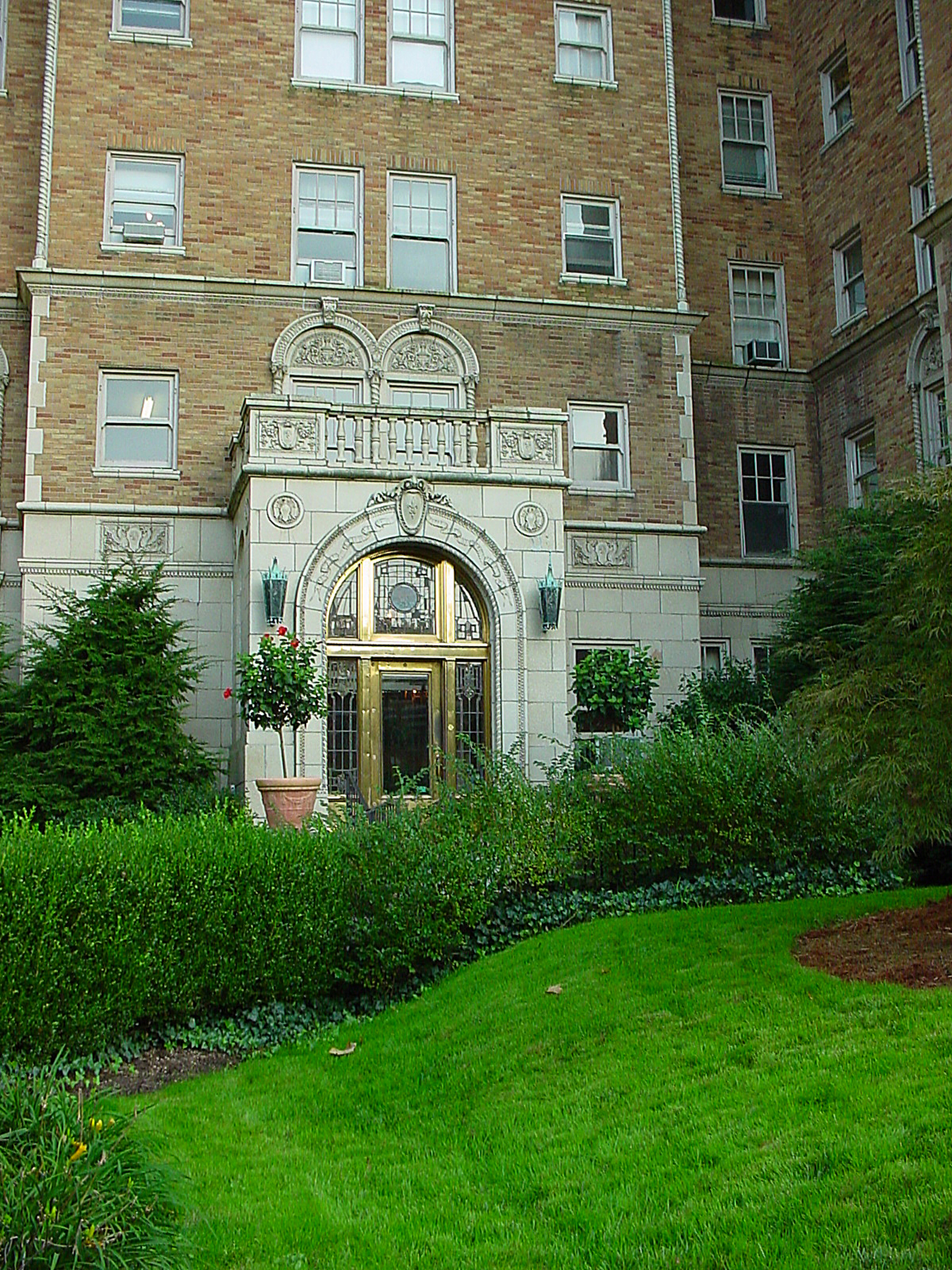
Front brass and stain-glassed entryway.

The 11-story 120 ft (37 m) high rise Commodore Apartment Building was opened in 1929 and designed by the architectural firm of Joseph & Joseph in 1928. The architects designed four other buildings in the Louisville area including the Republic Building (1916) and the Elsby (1918) in New Albany, Indiana. The building is located near Cherokee Park.

The building is built on land that was once owned by Isaac Everett, one of the founders of the Galt House. Everett purchased about 150 acres (0.61 km^{2}) of land for $25,000 (USD). The land then was used to build himself a mansion. The estate passed down to his daughter Harriet, who later married and became Harriet Bonnycastle. After her husband's death, she donated land to Louisville to build Cherokee Park to spur future developments in 1891. Harriet would sell parcels of land for over the next twenty years and eventually in the late 1920s the Commodore Apartments went up.

After surviving the Great Depression, and continuing as a luxury apartment building, it was sold for $650,000 and restored for another $125,000 in 1978 by Louisville native, actor and entrepreneur Roger Davis. Davis sold the Commodore in 1980 for $1,000,000 to Jack MacDonald of Acre Realty, Chicago which converted the Commodore from an apartment building to a condominium complex of 59 units.

The building's passenger elevators are among the few remaining that require an elevator operator. The building was added to the National Register of Historic Places on April 29, 1982.

== Gallery ==
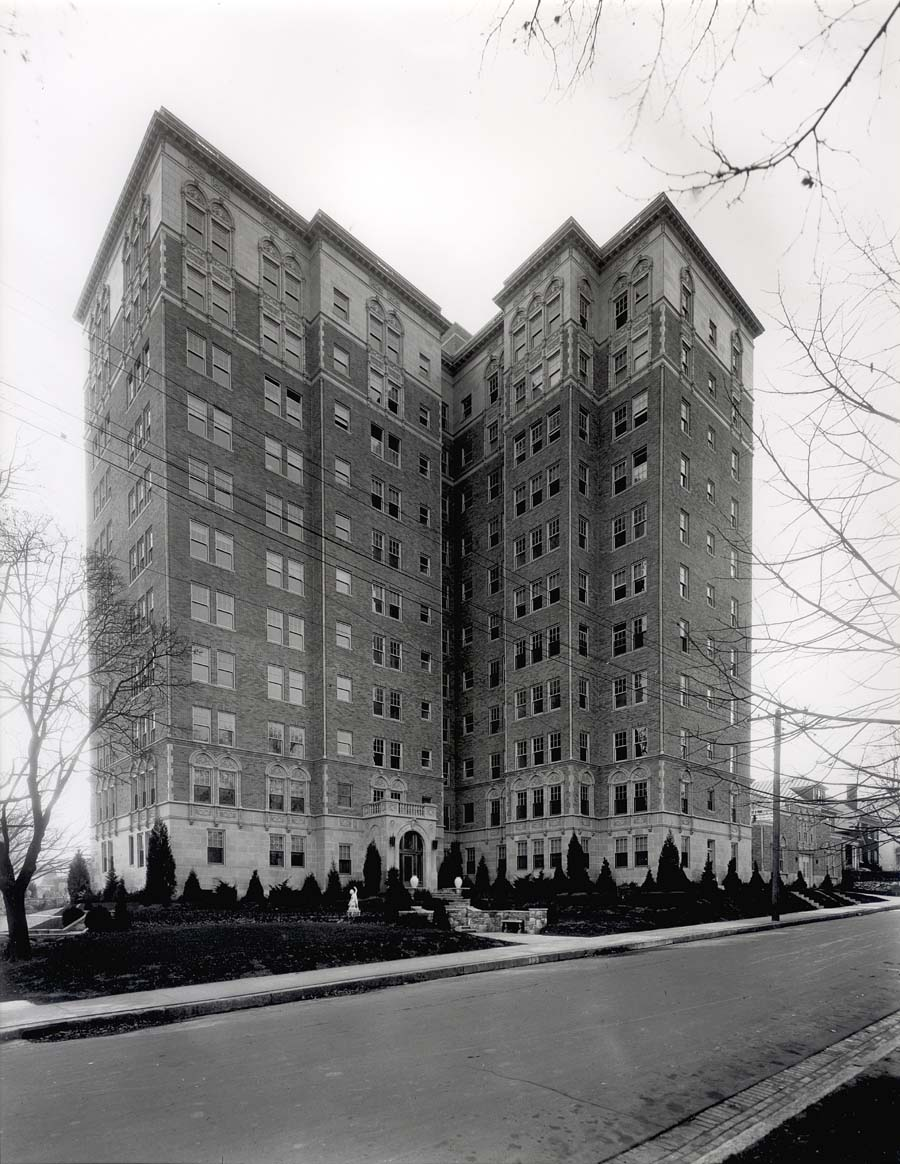
Opening Day, 1928. The Commodore Apartments.

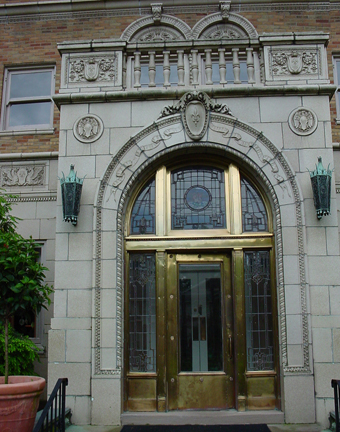
Architectural detail of entryway.

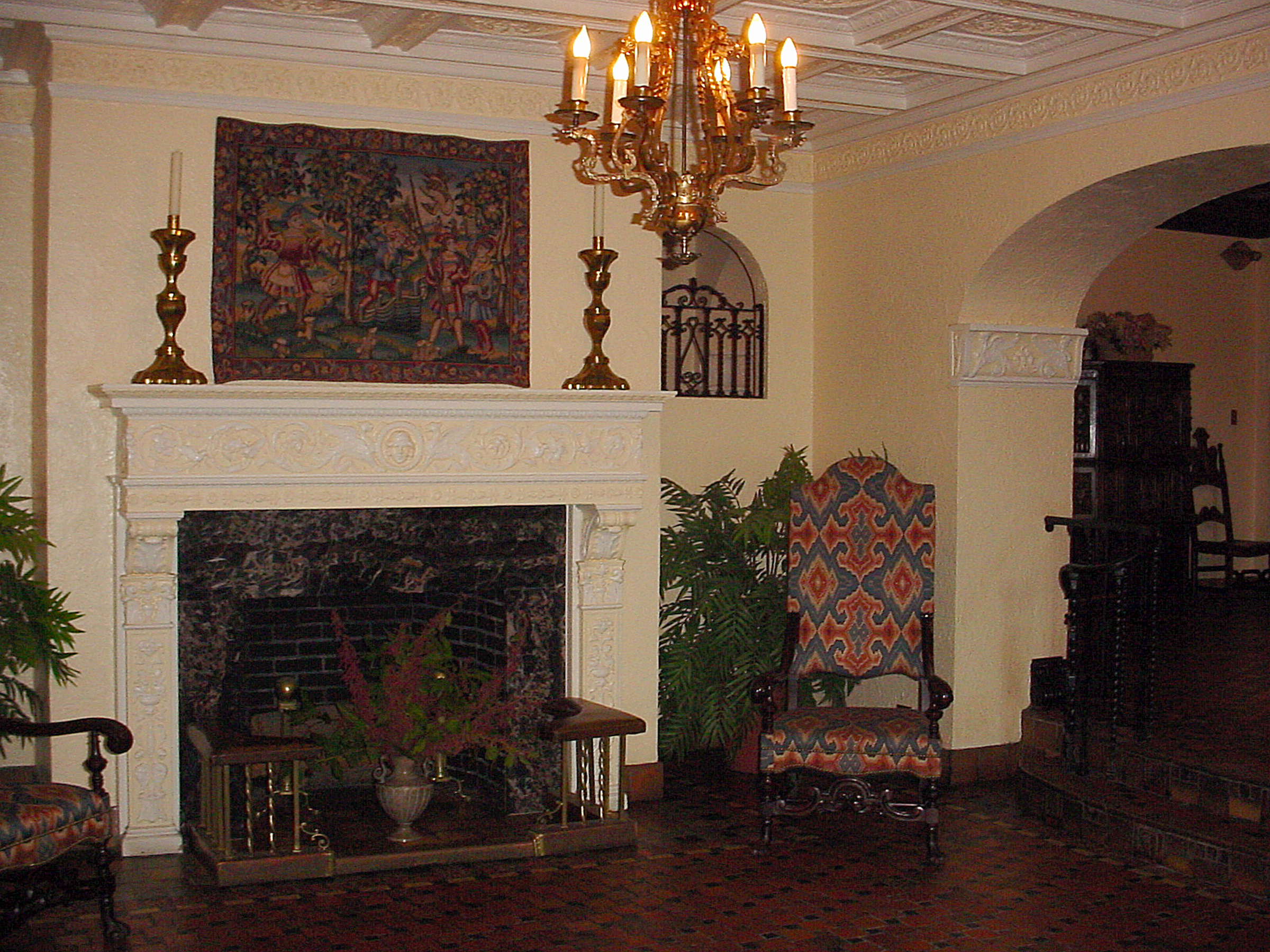
Main Lobby with fireplace.

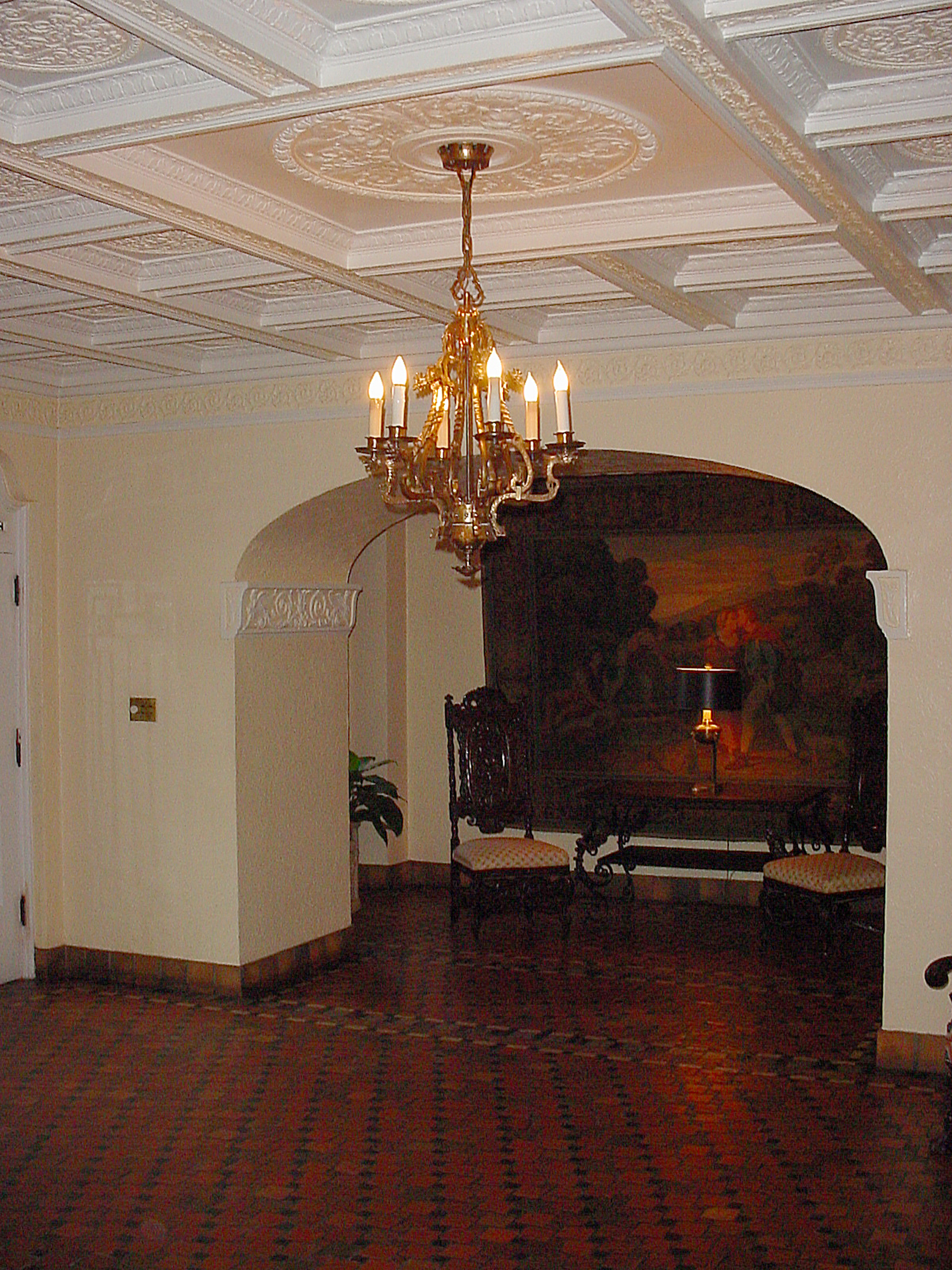
Left receiving area with historic tapestry "cartoon" and antiques.

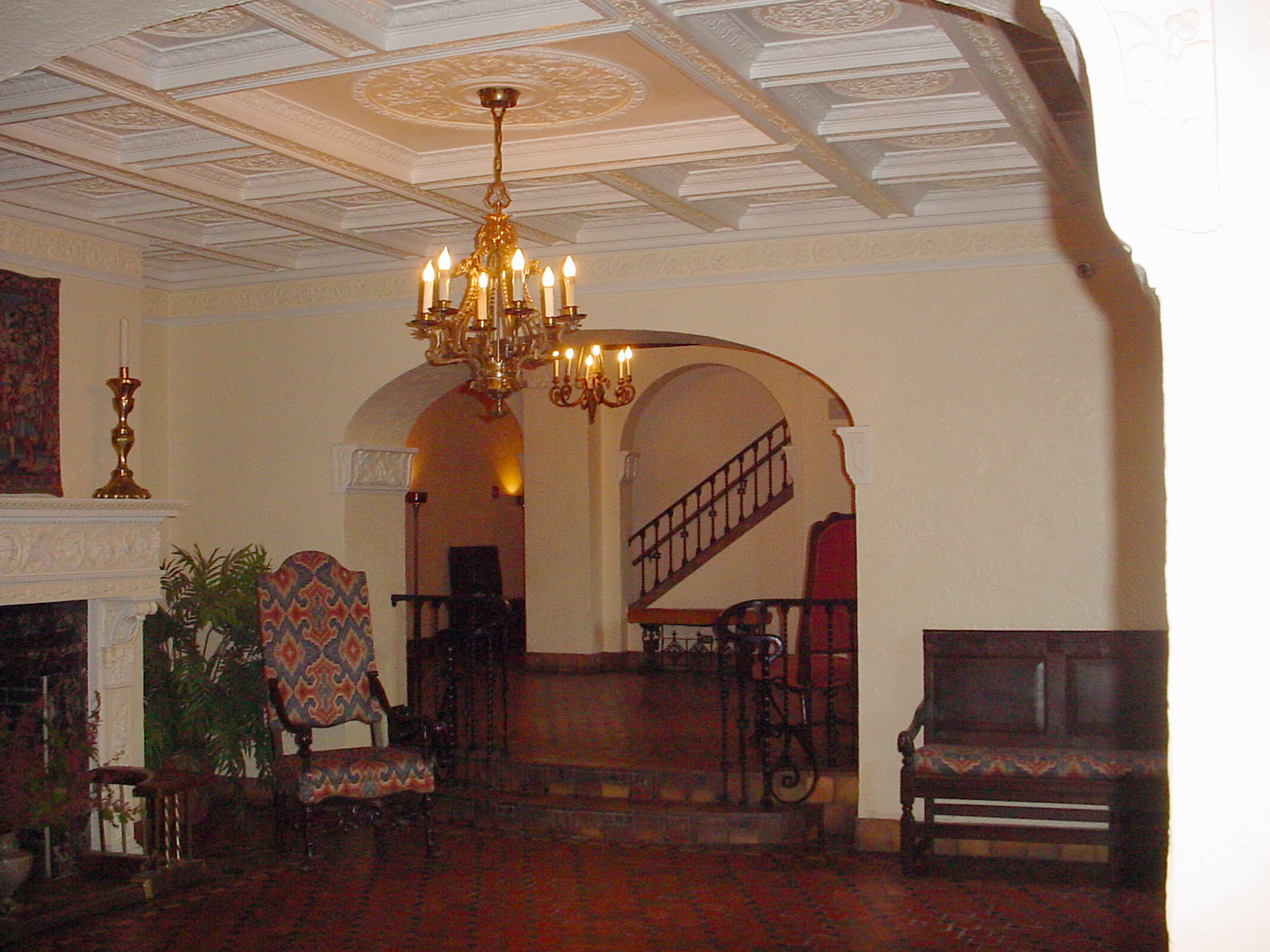
Looking toward the inner lobby.

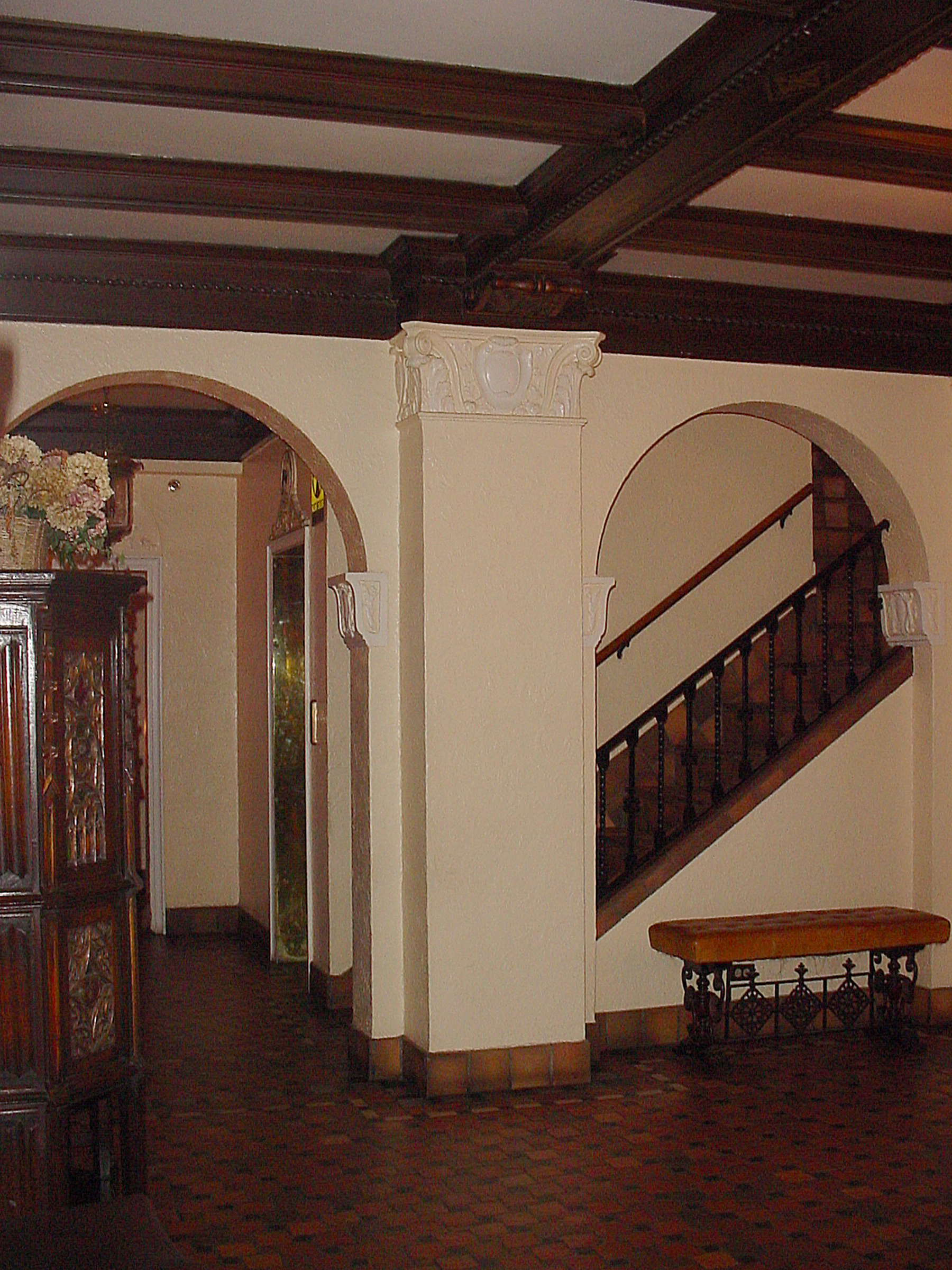
Looking toward the elevator.

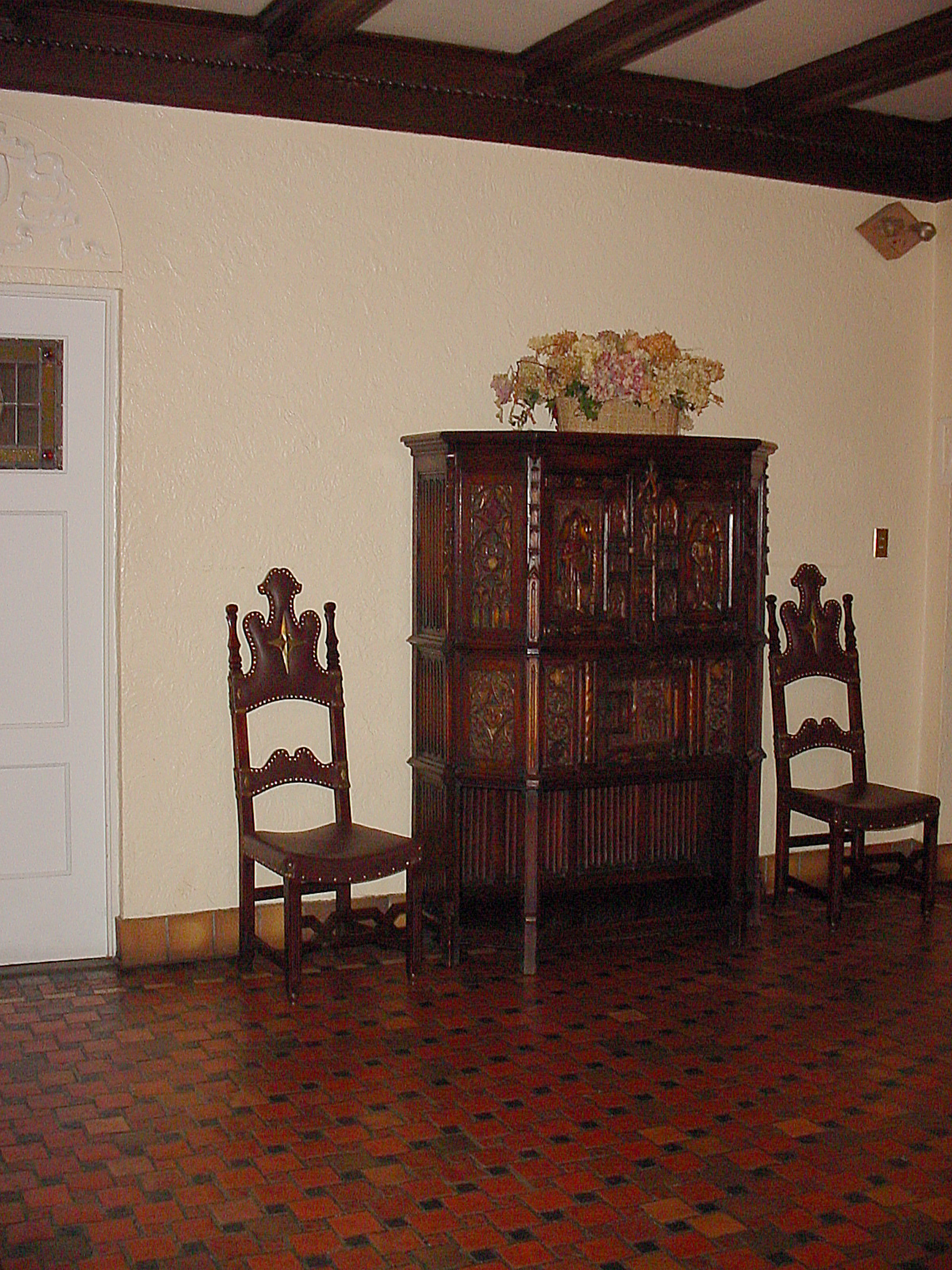
Antique hutch.

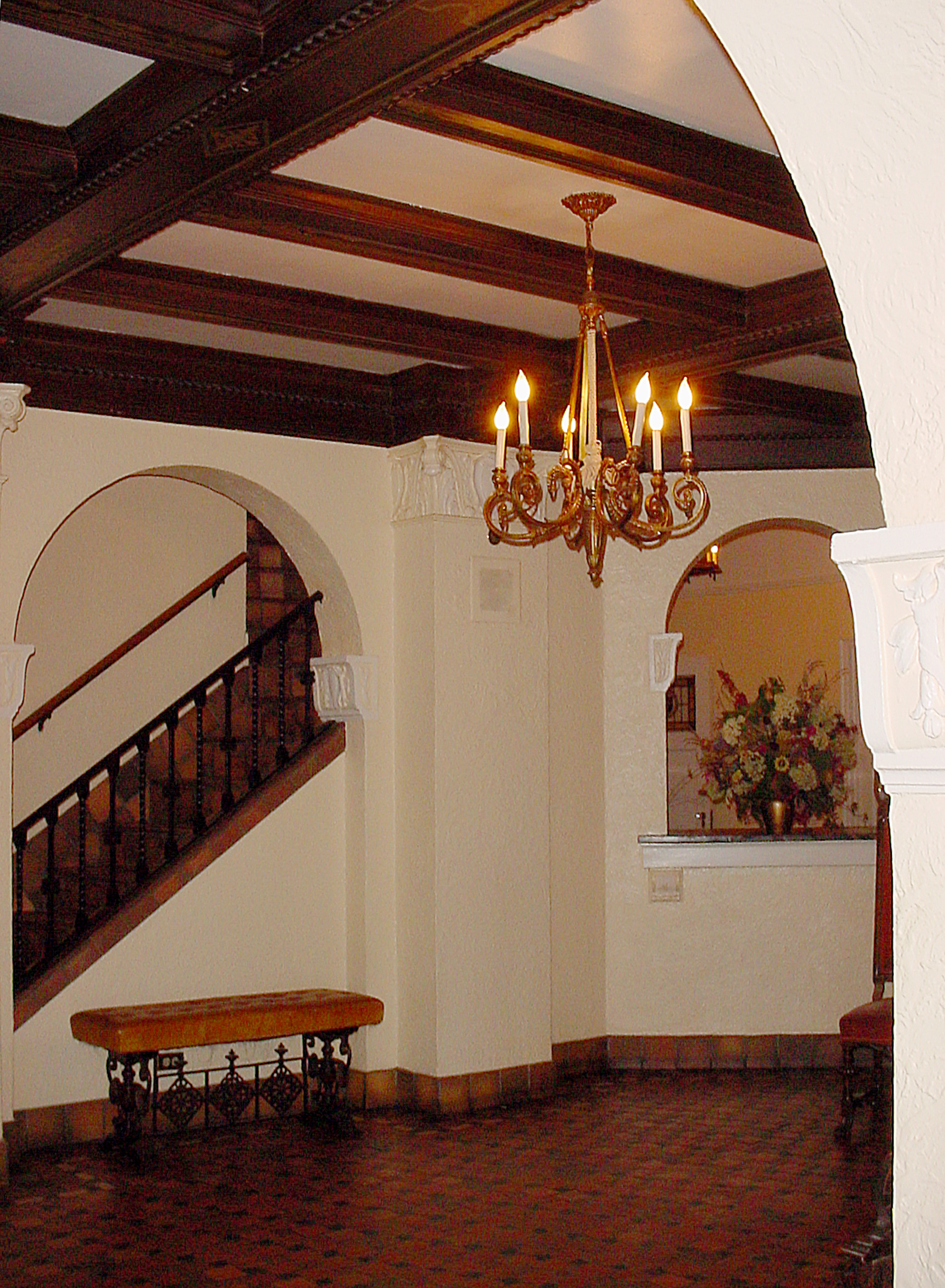
Looking toward office archway.

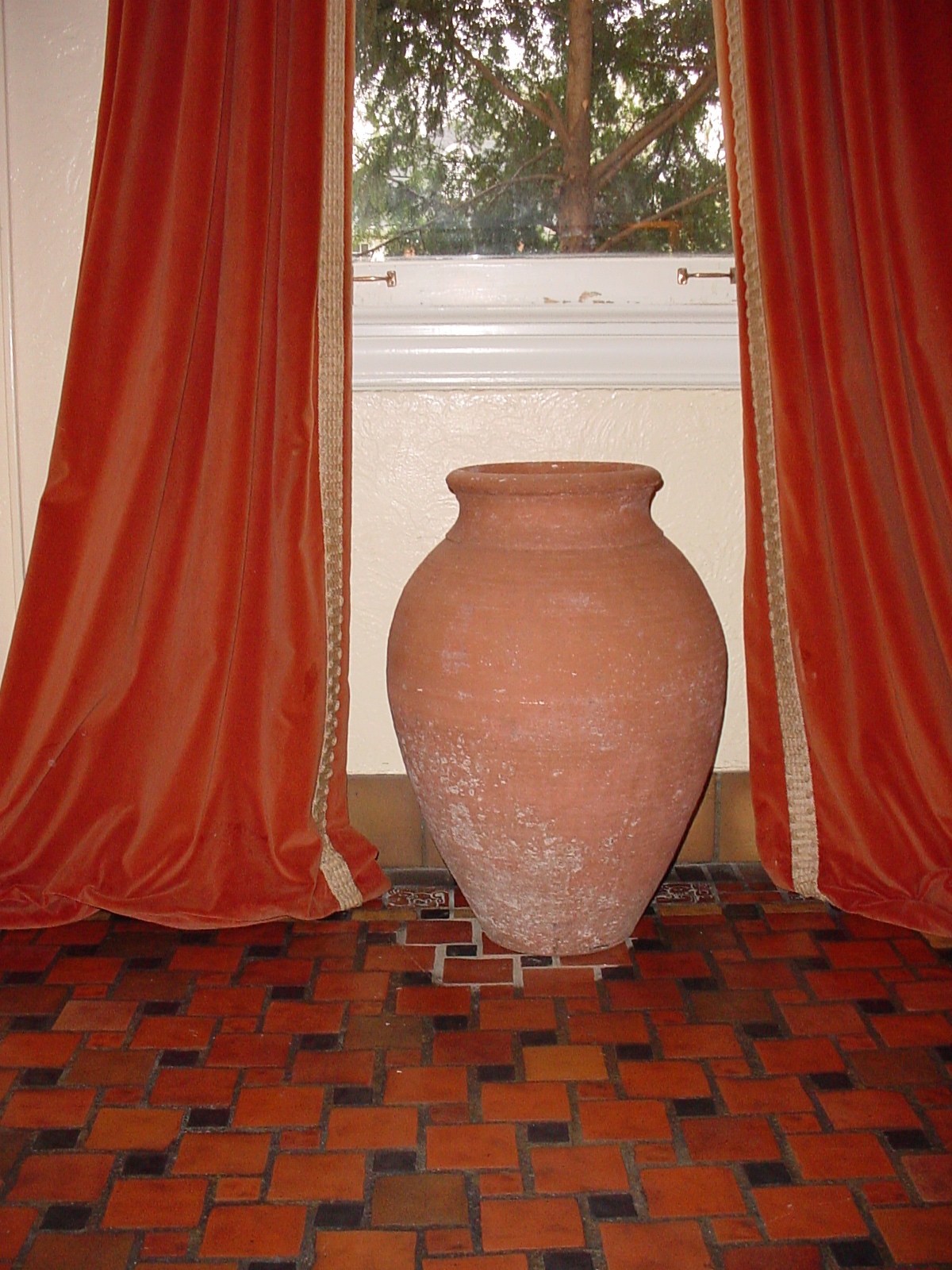
Rookwood Architectural Faience Garden Jar.

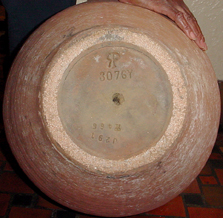
Rookwood markings.

== See also ==
- List of Registered Historic Places in Jefferson County, Kentucky
