= Cityscape of Louisville, Kentucky =

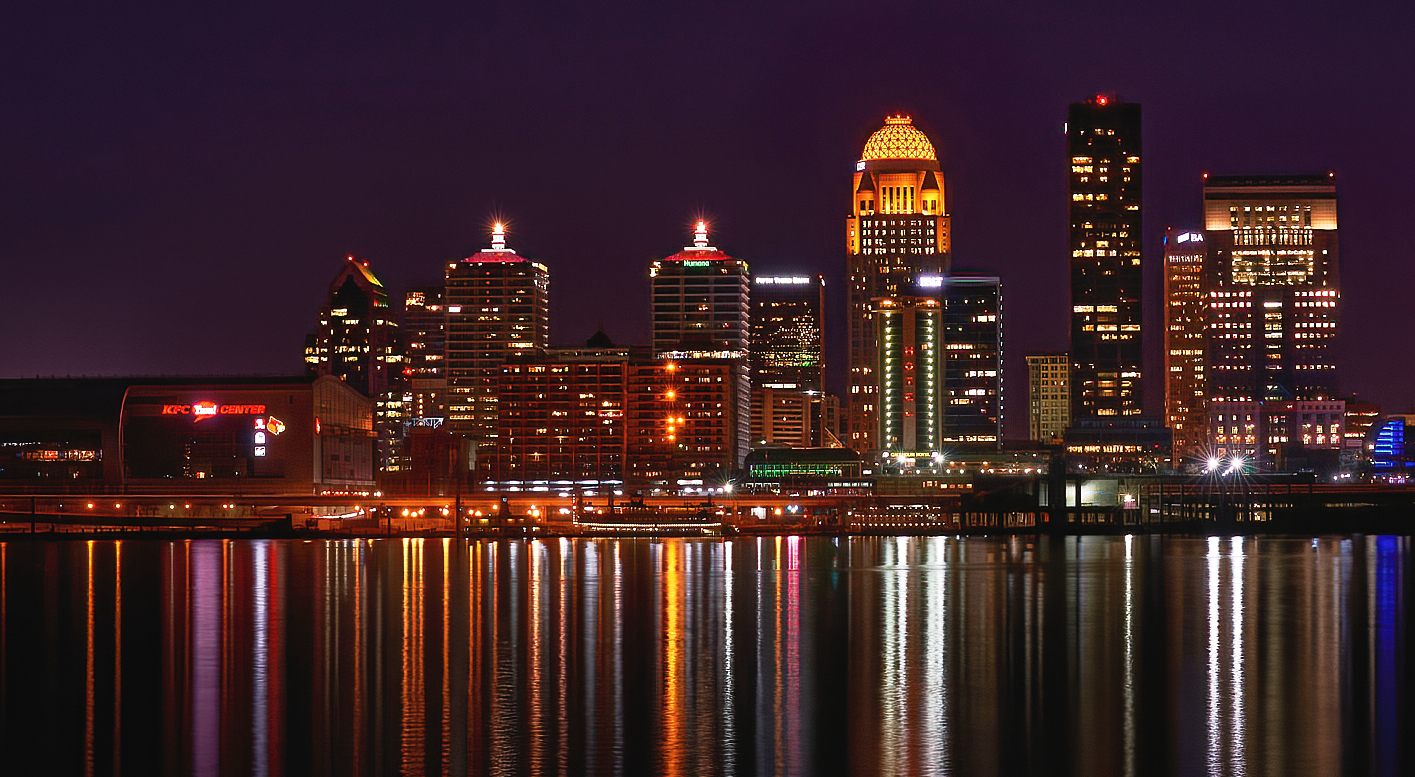
Louisville skyline at night

Louisville, Kentucky is home to numerous structures that are noteworthy due to their architectural characteristics or historic associations, the most noteworthy being the Old Louisville neighborhood, the third largest historic preservation district in the United States. The city also boasts the postmodern Humana Building and an expanding Waterfront Park which has served to remove the former industrial appearance of the riverfront.

== Business districts ==
The downtown business district of Louisville is located immediately south of the Ohio River, and southeast of the Falls of the Ohio. The airport is located approximately 6.5 miles (10.5 km) south of the downtown area, and easily connected to most parts of the city by three Interstate Highways, maximizing its accessibility. The largest industrial sections of town are located to the south and west of the airport, while most of the residential areas of the city are located to the southwest, south and east of downtown.

Another major business district is located in the more suburban area east of the city on Hurstbourne Parkway. This area is considered Louisville's key edge city—a relatively new concentration of business, shopping and entertainment outside a traditional urban area. Louisville also boasts a large number of parks, with 122 parks covering more than 14,000 acres (57 km^{2}).

== Transportation infrastructure ==
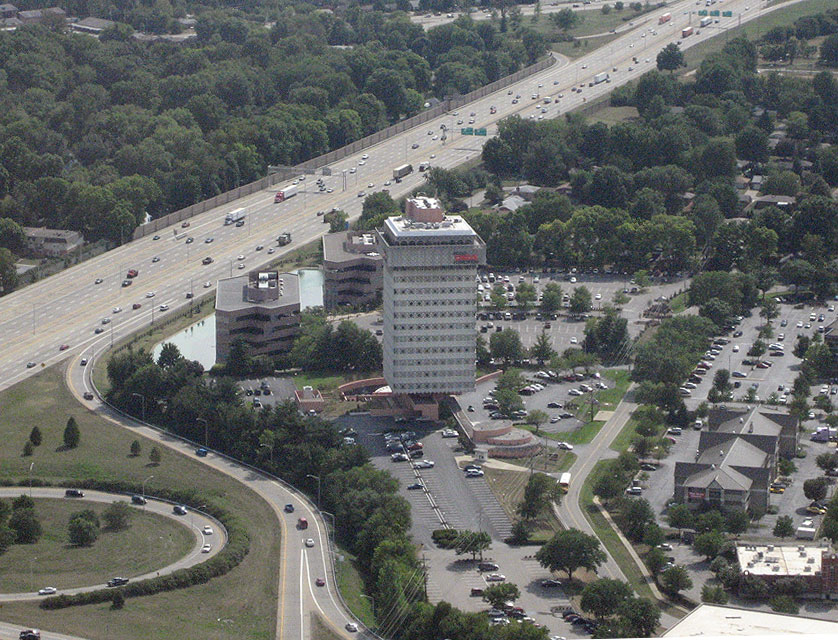
An aerial view of the Watterson Expressway in St Matthews

As of September 2016, there are four road bridges crossing the Ohio River to Indiana: the Sherman Minton Bridge (I-64) in the city's West End, the John F. Kennedy Memorial Bridge (I-65), the George Rogers Clark Memorial Bridge or Second Street Bridge (US 31), and the newly opened Abraham Lincoln Bridge that lies just east of the Kennedy bridge in Downtown Louisville. One more bridge is planned to be opened as part of the Ohio River Bridges Project by late 2016. This bridge will extend the Indiana and Kentucky segments of I-265 (via KY-841) to connect Utica, Indiana with Louisville's East End. Roads in southern Indiana branch out from the city originating from these bridges. I-71 branches out to the northeast from downtown Louisville toward Oldham County and Cincinnati.

Major roads extend outwards from the downtown area to all directions, like the spokes of a wheel. Many of these, such as Bardstown Road, are former privately owned turnpikes, which were made free roads by the city in 1901. Thus, as is typical of cities built on property organized by the Metes and bounds system, the old spoke roads extend relatively erratically from the city center, with turns and curves based on old geography and now-forgotten property ownership. In areas such as downtown, Old Louisville, and the West End, old turnpikes and roads were rebuilt to fit the grid, but in other areas, the spoke roads remained as the old farms they once served were developed. Where the spoke roads remained unaltered, smaller roads were built in between them as the farms were developed, either in a relatively gridiron style in older sections, or in curvilinear styles, often with many cul-de-sacs, in newer areas.

== Architecture ==
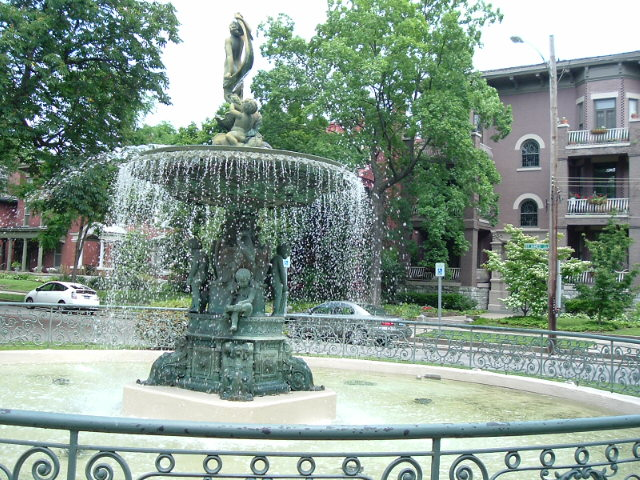
The fountain at St. James Court in Old Louisville

The city's architecture contains a blend of old and new. The Old Louisville neighborhood is the largest historic preservation district solely featuring Victorian homes and buildings in the United States; it is also the third largest such district overall. The Butchertown, Germantown, and Portland neighborhoods are known for their shotgun houses. The Louisville City Hall largely follows earlier architectural styles, mainly French Empire. The nearby Jefferson County Courthouse is an example of Greek Revival architecture. Likewise, many of the buildings downtown follow either the Greek Revival, Italian Renaissance or French Renaissance. These mix well with several of the city's postmodern skyscrapers. The buildings of the West Main District in downtown Louisville boast the largest collection of cast iron facades of anywhere outside of New York's SoHo district.

== Sides of town ==
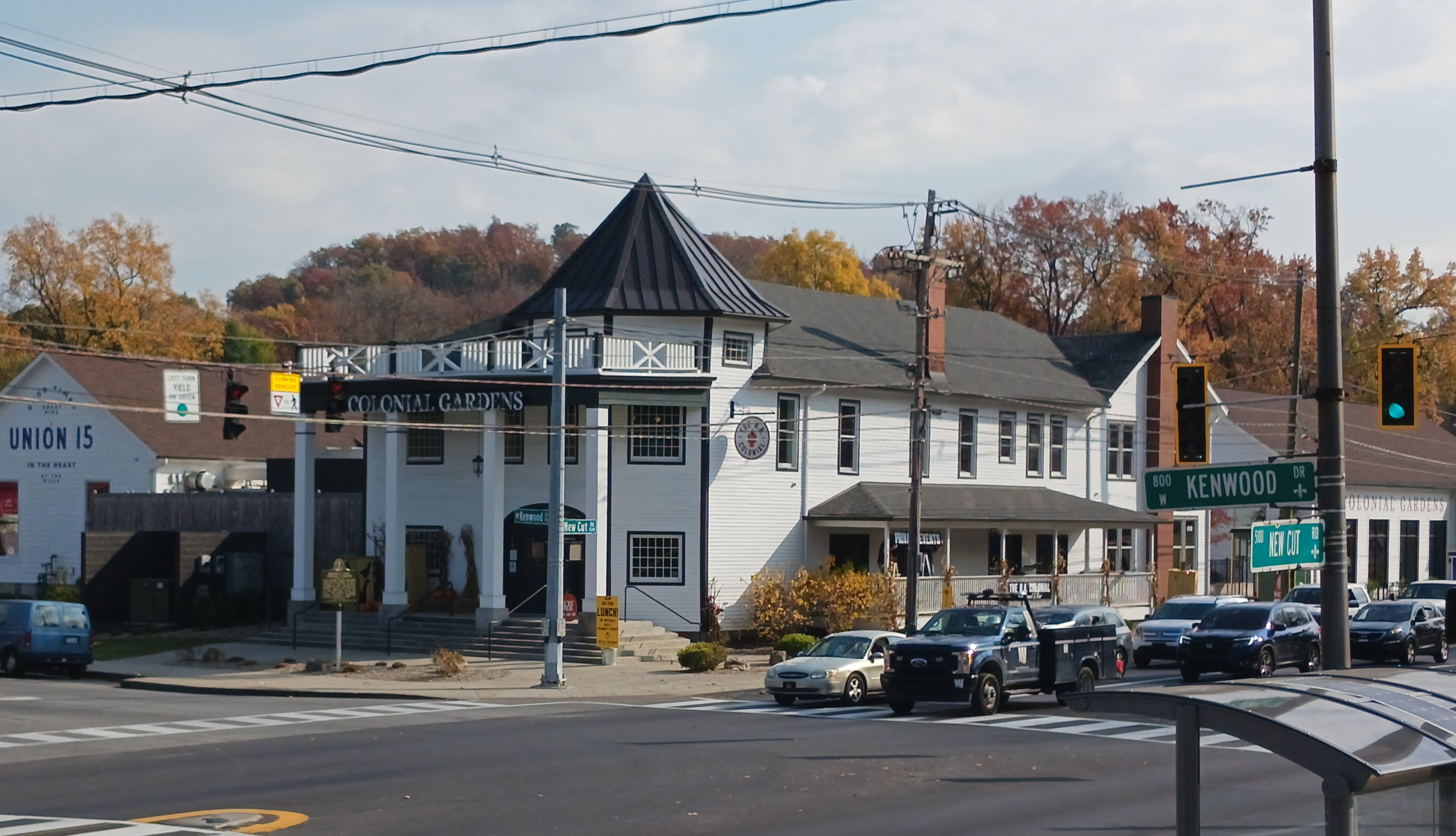
The Colonial Gardens restaurant complex in the Kenwood Hill neighborhood, in Louisville's South End

Louisville has traditionally been divided up into three sides of town: the West End, the South End, and the East End. In 2003, Bill Dakan, a University of Louisville geography professor, said that the West End, west of 7th Street and north of Algonquin Parkway, is "a euphemism for the African-American part of town" although he points out that this belief is not entirely true, and most African Americans no longer live in areas where more than 80% of residents are black. Nevertheless, he says the perception is still strong. According to the Greater Louisville Association of Realtors, the lowest median home values are west of Interstate 65 in the West and South Ends, the middle range of home values are between Interstates 64 and 65 in the South and East Ends, and the highest median home values are north of Interstate 64 in the East End. Immigrants from Southeast Asia tend to settle in the South End, while immigrants from Eastern Europe settle in the East End.

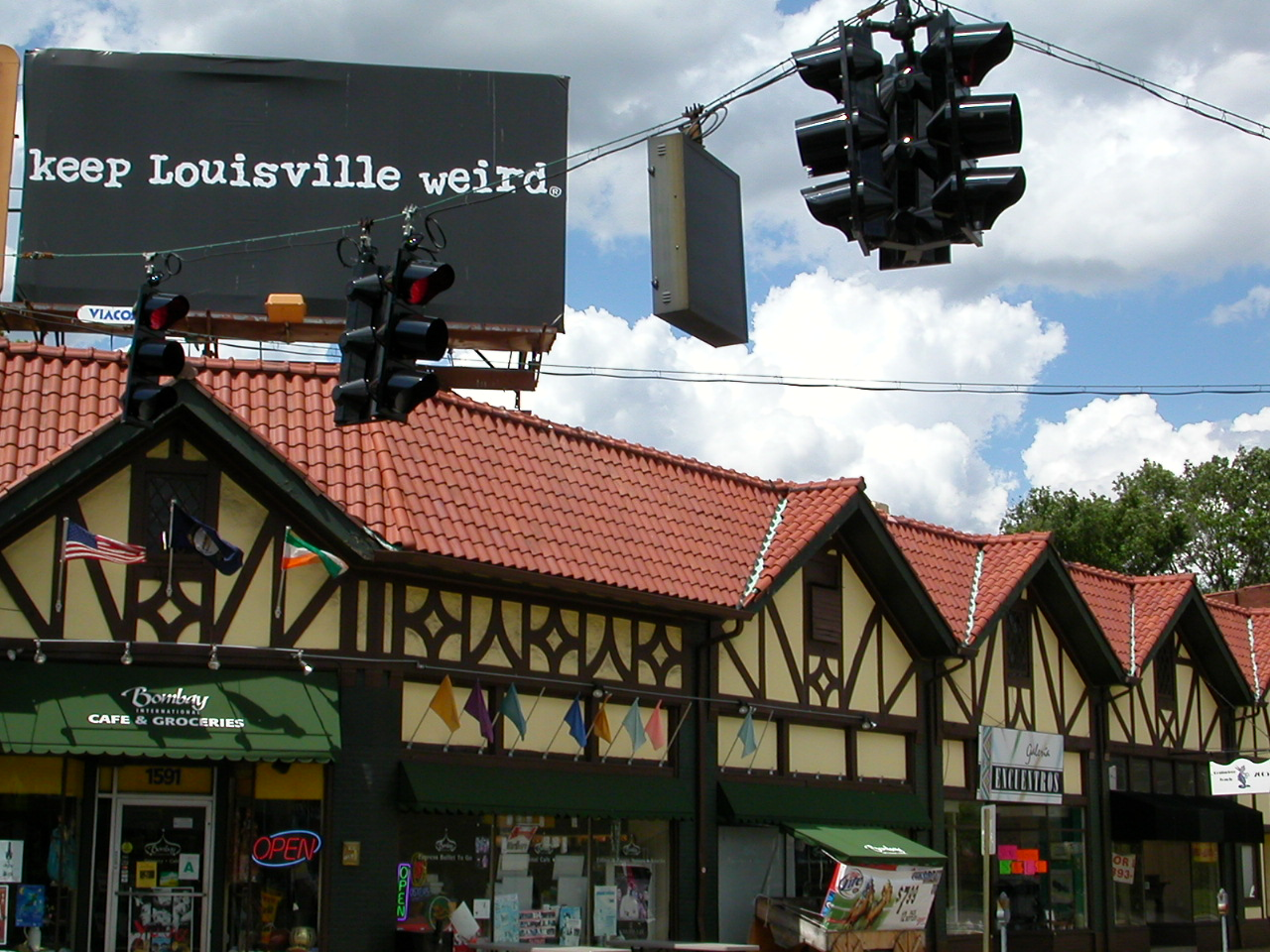
The Highlands neighborhood, centered on Bardstown Road, is Louisville's best known bohemian and night club area.

The most affluent residential areas are to the east of downtown Louisville. The nine richest locations by per capita income in Kentucky, and 19 of the top 20 such locations, are found in this East End, which trace their origins to several 19th-century summer colonies for wealthy Louisvillians. The nearest to downtown, as well as the wealthiest in terms of average income, is Mockingbird Valley, and the two most prominent and oldest Eastern Jefferson County cities are Anchorage and Glenview.

There are also two areas which are sometimes considered to be their own side of town. The area east of I-65, south of Eastern Parkway, and west of Bardstown Road is economically, culturally and topographically a buffer zone between the East and South sides, and is routinely claimed by both residents and outsiders as belonging to either side.

The interior areas of the city's east and south ends are also sometimes considered by some to be their own side of town, sometimes called the "Inner East side". The area basically from Old Louisville, along Eastern Parkway to The Highlands, and to the Butchertown and Clifton areas have seen an influx of young professionals in recent decades. These areas are home to mostly singles and non-families, are much more liberal than the rest of the city, and feature pedestrian-friendly shopping, with many eclectic shops. Most of these neighborhoods are either partly or entirely in historic preservation districts.

== Tallest buildings ==
The five tallest buildings in Louisville are all in downtown.

Building	Height (feet)	Stories	Year Completed
400 West Market	549	35	1993
National City Tower	512	40	1972
PNC Plaza	420	30	1972
Humana Building	417	27	1985
Omni Louisville Hotel	417	30	2018

Some notable tall buildings outside of the downtown area are 1400 Willow Avenue, a 21-story condominium complex near Cherokee Park completed in 1980; Baptist Towers, a 17-story retirement living community in Old Louisville; and the suburban office buildings Wright Tower (15 stories, completed in 1966), Watterson Towers (16 stories, completed in 1972), Hurstbourne Place (13 stories, completed in 1982) and the 11 story 120 ft (37 m) high rise Commodore Apartment Building, near Cherokee Park, built in 1929 and placed on the National Register of Historic Places on April 29, 1982.

== Future development projects ==
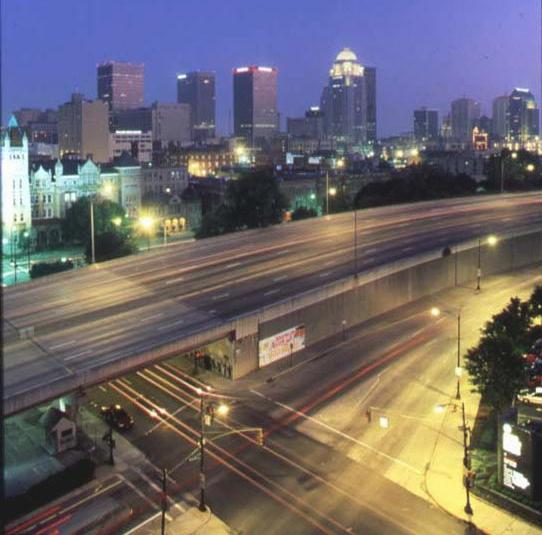
View of Downtown Louisville with Hospital Curve in the foreground

Several important projects in the city are slated for completions in the late 2000s to about 2020.

=== Recreation infrastructure ===
The creation of a "ring of parks" will connect the waterfront, Levee Bike Trail, the Farnsley-Moremen Landing, Jefferson Memorial Forest and E. P. "Tom" Sawyer State Park. It is currently under planning. Another recreational infrastructure project completed in 2014 was the conversion of the former Big Four railroad bridge over the Ohio River into the second longest pedestrian-only bridge in the world. There are also plans to use the existing (but closed) vehicle lanes on the K and I railroad bridge over the Ohio River as a pedestrian sidewalk to connect Louisville's Riverwalk Trail to a planned 7-mile (11 km) greenway on the Indiana side which will connect New Albany, Clarksville and Jeffersonville. Status: Segments currently range from planning to completion.

=== Roadway infrastructure ===
The primary roadway project will be the controversial $3.9 billion Ohio River Bridges Project, which includes the reconstruction of the Kennedy Interchange, where Interstates 64, 65 and 71 meet. It also includes the construction of an I-265 eastern span and the dualization of the I-65 downtown span.

=== Urban infrastructure ===
- RiverPark Place, a mixed low and high-rise apartment/condominium development covering 40 acres (160,000 m^{2}) including a 150-slip marina between River Road and the Ohio River, near Towhead Island. A 16-foot wide walkway is to be developed along the river's edge, connecting with Waterfront Park to the west, and Beargrass Creek and Eva Bandman Park to the east. Status: Completed, On hold since 2008, resumed late in 2011.
- Park DuValle is a $200 million investment that is revitalizing an existing neighborhood by applying principles of new urbanism into its design. Park Duvalle was formerly a massive public works housing project with barrack-styled housing that became essentially a warehouse for low-income residents. The new community is based on a mixed-income design that features pedestrian-friendly neighborhoods, large recreation and civic spaces, single-family homes, duplexes and small townhouse multi-family structures in period-style design. Status: Completed.
- Norton Commons, located 20 minutes northeast of downtown in Prospect, near I-71 and I-265, is a 595-acre (2.41 km^{2}) mixed-use development based on new urbanism principles. It's a multi-year development and will feature single-family homes, duplexes and townhomes, along with traditional looking storefronts, civic spaces and parks in a variety of period-inspired designs all within walking distance. Status: Completed, Plans called for a total of 2,900 residences, and 560,000 square feet (52,000 m^{2}) of commercial space.

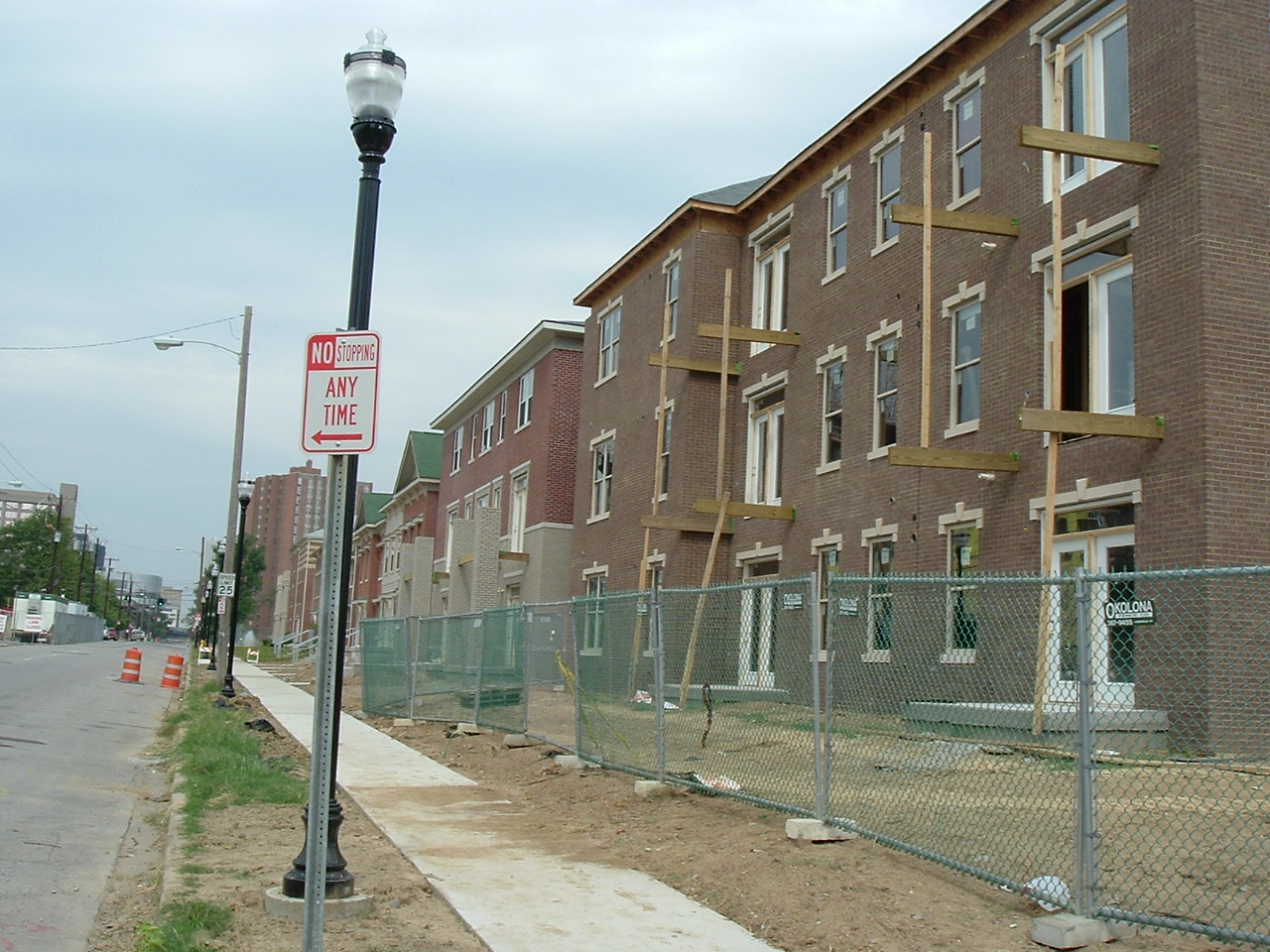
Liberty Green, a mixed-income residential complex under construction.

- Liberty Green, a 29-acre (120,000 m^{2}) $233 million project that will have 448 rental apartments/townhomes and 250 home-ownership townhomes in the Phoenix Hill neighborhood just east of downtown Louisville, and will include a recreational facility and possibly some commercial space. Status: Completed, Rentals were scheduled for completion by 2009, Sales of townhomes by 2018.
- KFC Yum! Center, a 22,000-seat arena in Downtown Louisville, bounded by River Road and Main, Second, and Third Streets, that is now the home for the University of Louisville men's and women's basketball teams. The arena was the main part of a $450 million project that also included a 975-space parking garage and a floodwall; the arena itself cost $252 million. Status: Completed; opened October 10, 2010.
- Lynn Family Stadium, a soccer stadium for Louisville City FC, the city's team in soccer's USL Championship league, opened in 2020 in the Butchertown neighborhood, just east of downtown. The stadium has also been home to Racing Louisville FC since it started play in the National Women's Soccer League in 2021. Status: Completed; opened July 12, 2020.
- Nucleus Research Park, In 2007 U of L announced plans to create a nine-acre medical research park on the so-called Haymarket property roughly bounded by Market, Preston, Brook, and Jefferson Streets, along I-65 in Downtown Louisville, with 1,000,000 square feet (93,000 m^{2}) of research space. The project is expected to cost $300 million and would be constructed from 2009 to 2017. A 200,000-square-foot, eight-story, $18 million building, is the first in a series of structures, broke ground in July 2011, and was expected to open in May 2013. Status: Completed; Opened October 23, 2013.

== See also ==
- Geography of Louisville, Kentucky
- List of attractions and events in the Louisville metropolitan area
- List of parks in the Louisville metropolitan area
- Neighborhoods in Louisville, Kentucky, including:
  - List of cities in Jefferson County, Kentucky
