= Schuster Building =

- U.S. National Register of Historic Places
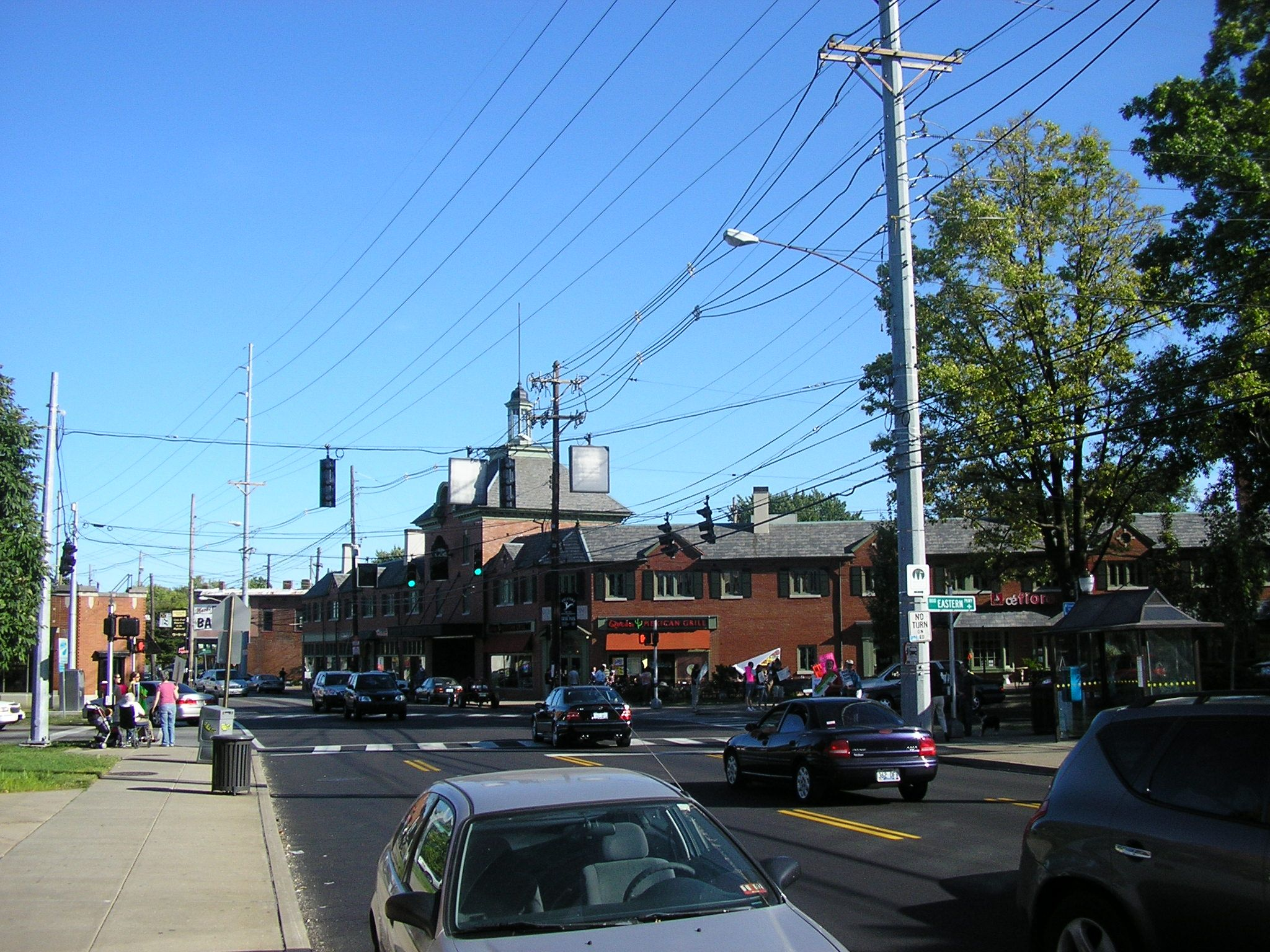
- The Schuster Building in 2007

- Location within Kentucky Location within the United States
- Location: 1500 Bardstown Rd, Louisville, Kentucky
- Coordinates: 38°13′54″N 85°42′33″W
- Area: Deer Park neighborhood
- Built: 1927
- Architect: Nevin, Wischmeyer & Morgan
- Architectural style: Colonial Revival
- NRHP reference No.: 80001618
- Added to NRHP: October 18, 1980

The Schuster Building is a mixed-use structure at the intersection of Bardstown Road and Eastern Parkway in the Highlands area of Louisville, Kentucky, United States. Added to the National Register of Historic Places in 1980 as a "significant example" of Colonial Revival architecture as applied to commercial buildings, the Schuster building is one of Louisville's most prominent examples of that style.

The Colonial Revival style was part of an emerging trend in American design at the time the building was completed in 1927, and was later popularized by the restoration of Colonial Williamsburg.

In the years following the completion of the Schuster Building, several prominent structures in the same style were built in Louisville, such as the University of Louisville Administration Building in 1929, and Norton and Mullins halls of the Southern Baptist Theological Seminary in 1930.

== History ==
The Schuster Building was designed by the Louisville firm of Nevin, Wischmeyer & Morgan, which also designed the Pendennis Club's clubhouse.

Built in 1927, the 35,000-square-foot (3,300 m^{2}) Schuster Building was the largest of several mixed-use buildings that were built in the pre-World War II era along Bardstown Road, the commercial corridor of what was then Louisville's wealthiest suburban area, the Highlands.

The building originally housed shops, professional offices, apartments and the 14,000-square-foot (1,300 m^{2}) Uptown Theater. The 1,100 seat Uptown was equipped for both live theater and film, with a full stage, orchestra pit and organ.

=== Decline and renovation ===
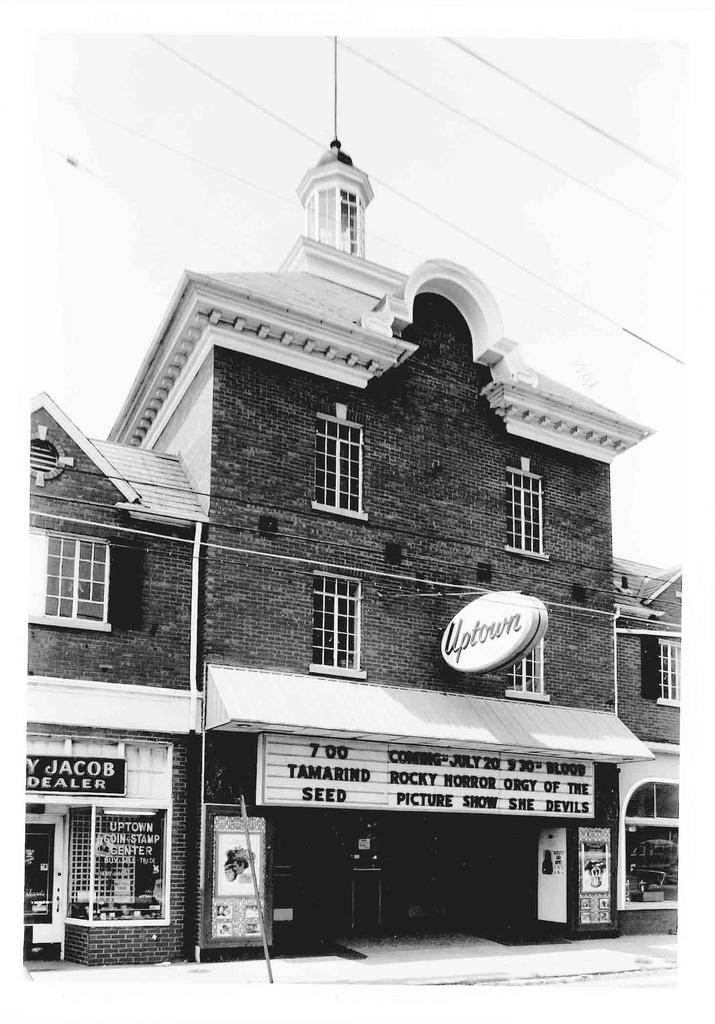
The Uptown Theater lobby entrance in 1979

The building changed little into the 1980s. As shops came and went, there were essentially no alterations to the upper floors and only minor ones to the ground floor. The Uptown Theater remained as the anchor of the building, but attendance tapered off over the years, and by the 1980s closure was inevitable. When the Uptown closed in 1989, it had survived longer than any other neighborhood theater in Louisville except the Vogue.

In the late 1980s and early 1990s, Highlands residents formed an organization to raise awareness and attempt to renovate and reopen the Uptown (at one point as a film museum named after Kentucky native D.W. Griffith), but were unable to raise the $1 million needed for the project.

The planned renovation of the building, which involved demolishing the theater to create a parking lot, was stalled by a slow economy in the early 1990s. While the building was in limbo, several alternate uses were proposed, such as turning it into a public library branch, dance hall or a modern 8-screen cineplex. This uncertainty alarmed neighbors, and led to the building being listed in 1992 as one of the 10 "most-endangered" buildings in Louisville.

The cineplex plan gained the most support, both from developers and local politicians, and for a while seemed to be in the serious planning stages. However, many neighbors opposed it, citing concerns about security, traffic and parking, and developers eventually dropped the cinema plan. In 1996, a modern multi-screen cinema opened a few blocks away, in the form of Baxter Avenue Theatres, now Baxter Avenue Filmworks, at Mid-City Mall.

In 1994, the Uptown Theater was demolished, clearing a large space behind the building where a parking lot was built, and the property was revived when a restaurant and other businesses moved in. Apartments were removed from the second and third floors and converted to office space.

Although the Uptown Theater has been demolished, the exterior of the building remains largely unmodified. The theater's lobby is now the dining room of a Qdoba restaurant, but the old ticket window can still be recognized as part of the storefront.

== Local influence ==
As the landmark building in the area, the Schuster Building has influenced nearby development. Across the street, a Valvoline outlet was built with brick chosen to match the colors used in the Schuster Building. A large, mixed-use building on the opposite corner, called Highland Station, was designed to resemble the Schuster Building, with storefronts flush with the Bardstown Road sidewalk and an outdoor dining area and green space alongside Eastern Parkway.
