= Ear X-tacy =

Record store in Louisville, Kentucky (1985–2011)

Coordinates: 38.224°N 85.69279°W

The ear X-tacy logo

ear X-tacy was a Louisville, Kentucky, "alternative record store" owned and operated by John Timmons. The store announced its closing on October 31, 2011, after 26 years in business.

== History ==
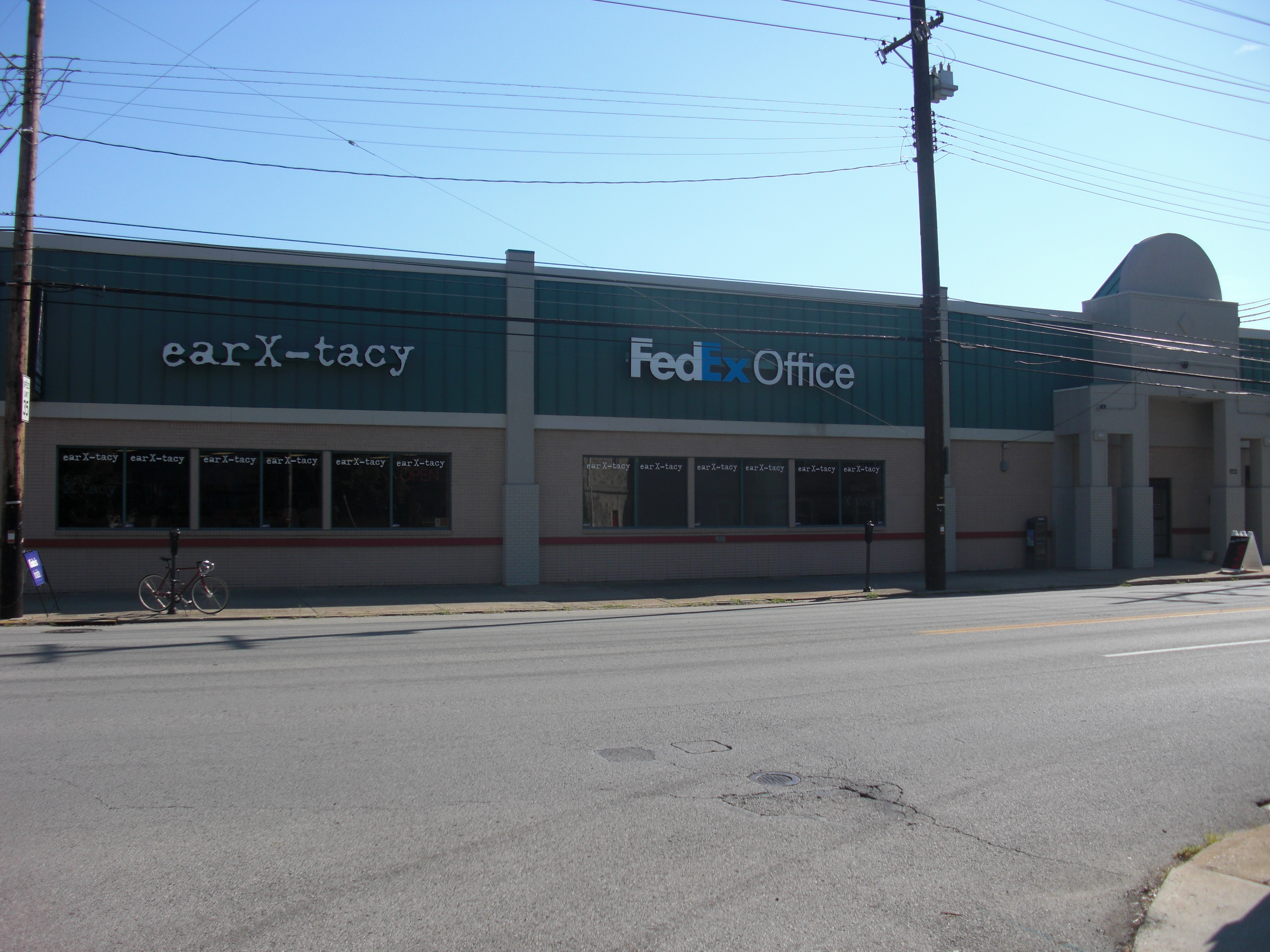
Former ear-X-tacy storefront on Bardstown Road. Entrance to the building is at the far right of the photo. Both windows were part of ear X-tacy.

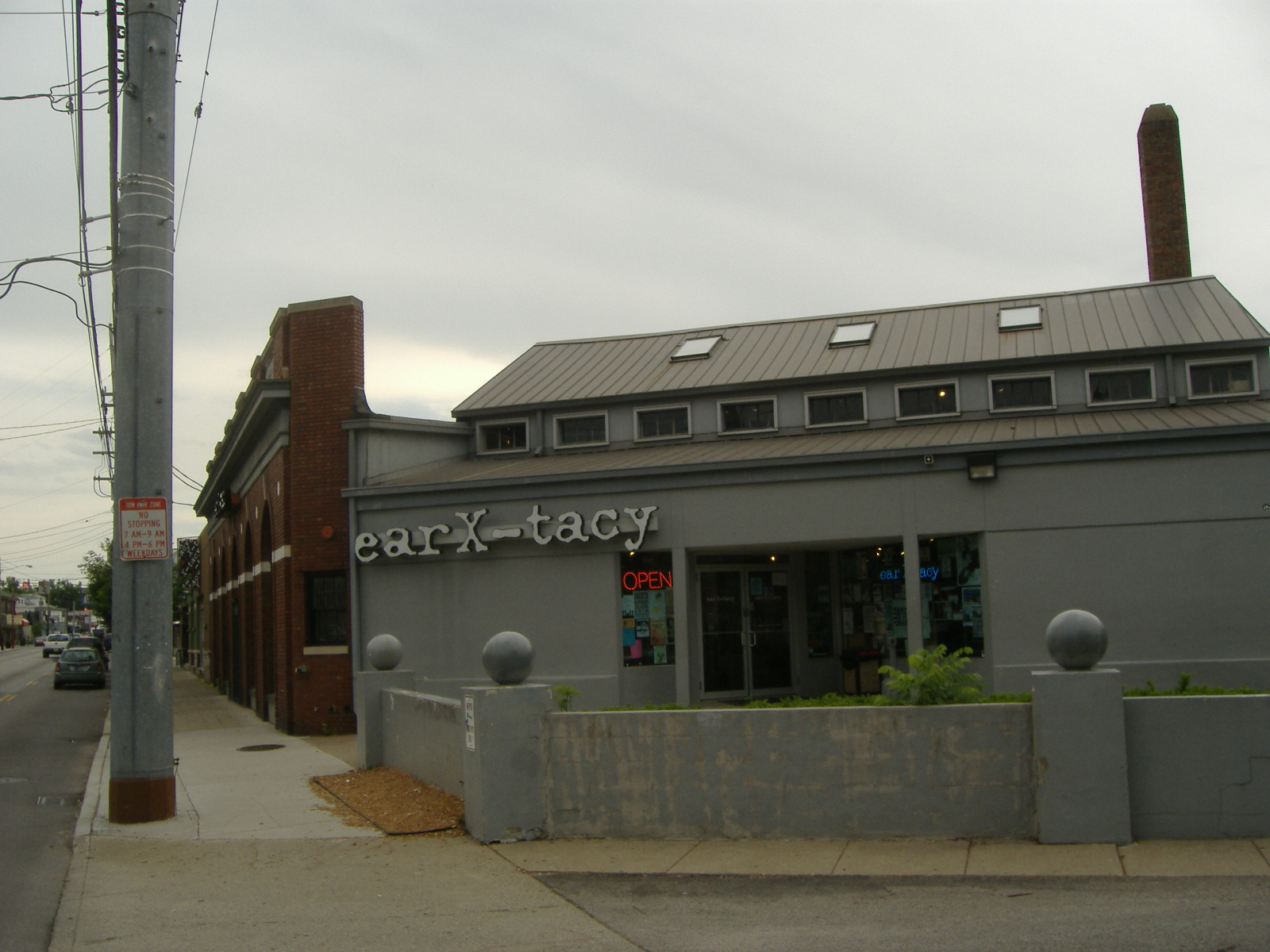
Previous ear-X-tacy storefront on Bardstown Road (2001–2010), now occupied by a Panera Bread location.

ear X-tacy first opened in 1985 in a 500 ft^{2} (46 m^{2}) building stocked with John Timmons' personal records "and a cash advance on his Mastercard". The store name came from the band XTC, of which owner John Timmons is a fan. As the store grew, it changed locations three times over a period of sixteen years. It then remained at the same location, in a former bathroom fixtures showroom on Bardstown Road, just south of Eastern Parkway in The Highlands, until late July 2010. It then moved to the Douglass Loop, a former streetcar turnaround point on Bardstown Road about 1 mile (1.6 km) southeast of its previous location but still in The Highlands.

ear X-tacy carried a wide variety of compact discs, cassette tapes and vinyl records. It also carried a large stock of DVDs, including many hard-to-find items. In 1995, Timmons launched the ear X-tacy record label, which released records by Louisville-based musicians such as Tim Krekel.

Due to financial issues, ear X-tacy moved for the final time to a smaller location in 2010, just south of where their previous location was on Bardstown Road. However, the financial issues continued and ear X-tacy owner John Timmons made the decision to permanently close. ear X-tacy officially closed on October 31, 2011, but due to the amount of unsold inventory still remaining after the close, the store held a liquidation sale in December 2011 before officially closing for good.

ear X-tacy also operated a second location in the Eastgate Shopping Center in Middletown from 1992 through 1998.

The store's signature white-on-black logo stickers spawned a local fad wherein people cut up and reassembled the distinctive letters to form other words or phrases, such as "taX yer cat", "racy aXe" or "area X".

In 2012, a documentary about ear X-tacy was released, titled Brick and Mortar and Love.
