= The Highlands, Louisville =

Area in Louisville, USA

Coordinates: 38.22730°N 85.70830°W

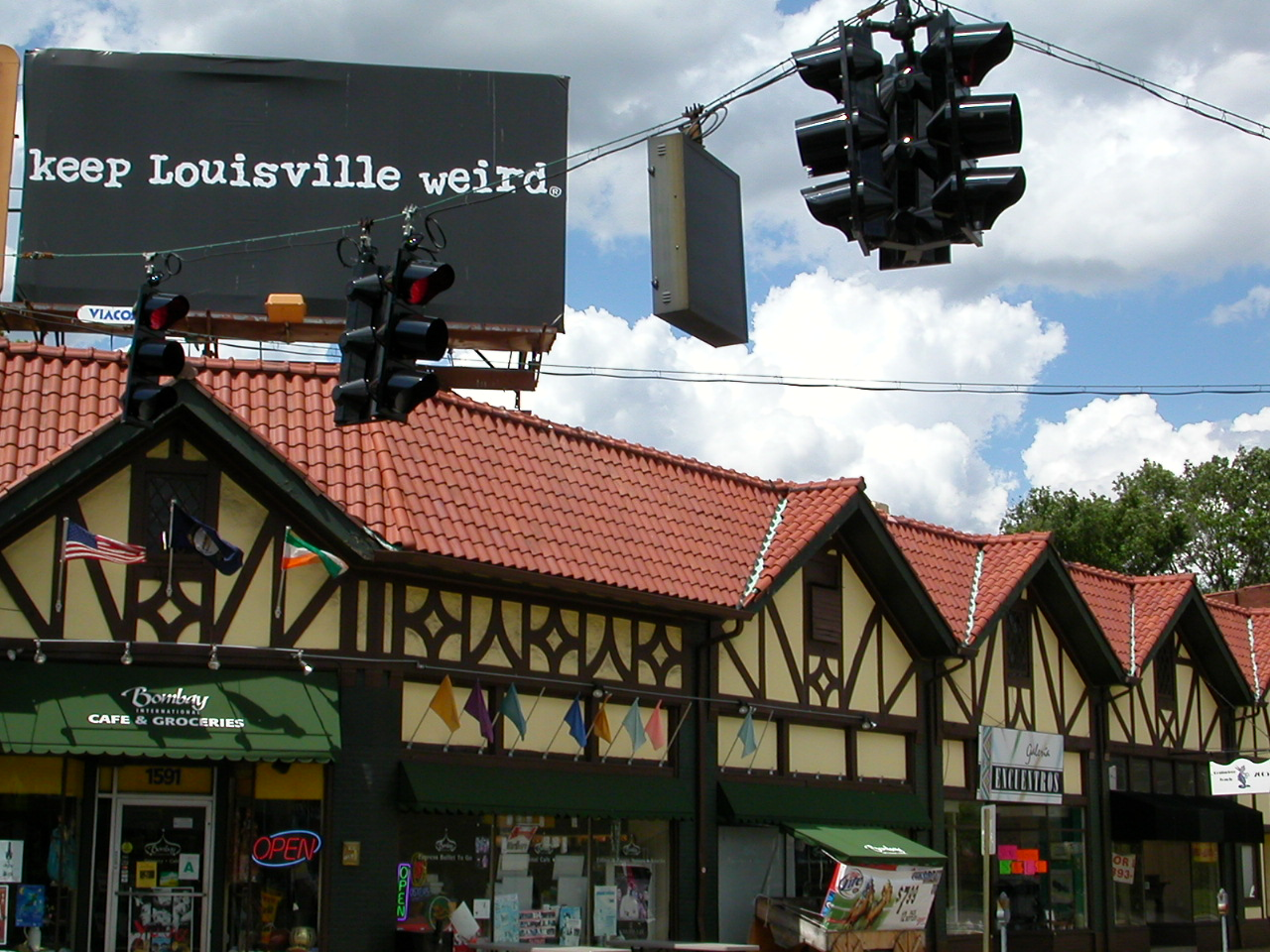
Bardstown Road and Bonnycastle is part of what is called the "Heart of the Highlands". Above this landmark Faux Tudor building is a "Keep Louisville Weird" sign promoting locally owned businesses in Louisville.

The Highlands is an area in Louisville, Kentucky, which contains a high density of nightclubs, eclectic businesses, and many upscale and fast food restaurants. It is centered along a three-mile (5 km) stretch of Bardstown Road and Baxter Avenue (US 31E/US 150) and is so named because it sits atop a ridge between the middle and south forks of Beargrass Creek. The commercial area extends from the intersection of Bardstown Road and Taylorsville Road/Trevillian Way in the south, to the intersection of Baxter Avenue and Lexington Road in the north. Due to its large collection of night clubs and restaurants, it is locally known as "Restaurant Row".

The residential area is separated from other adjacent areas like Germantown and Crescent Hill by the south and north forks of Beargrass Creek. In 2000, the Highlands had a population of nearly 33,000.

== Description ==
The Highlands neighborhood of Louisville, Kentucky is centered along a three-mile (5 km) stretch of Bardstown Road and Baxter Avenue (US 31E/US 150). Its name comes from the regions geography, as it sits atop a ridge between the middle and south forks of Beargrass Creek.

The commercial area extends from the intersection of Bardstown Road and Taylorsville Road/Trevillian Way in the south, to the intersection of Baxter Avenue and Lexington Road in the north, a length of 3.2 miles (5.1 km). A 1/2-mile (800 m) section of the nearby Barret Avenue also contains many similar businesses.

The residential area is separated from other adjacent areas like Germantown and Crescent Hill by the south and north forks of Beargrass Creek. The creek's middle fork runs through Cherokee Park, and the south fork divides Germantown from Tyler Park, after flowing past several cemeteries and undeveloped forests downstream from Joe Creason Park. The grid of streets east and west of Bardstown Road are mostly single-family residences and range from working-class neighborhoods to some of the most expensive streets in Louisville, such as Spring Drive. In 2000, the Highlands had a population of nearly 33,000.

== History ==
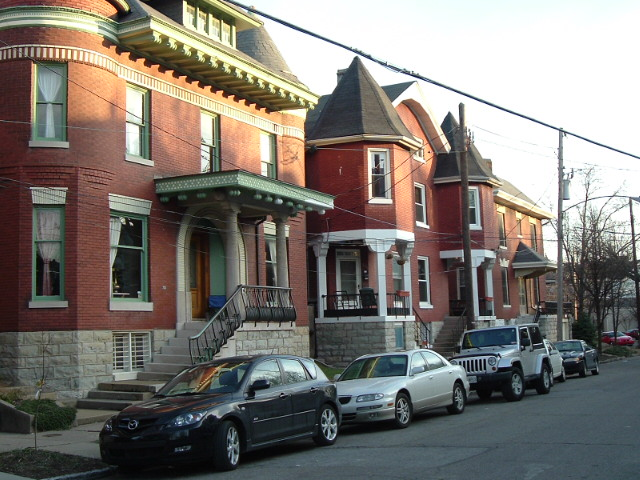
A residential street in the Original Highlands

The Highlands was the last area near downtown Louisville to be urbanized, since its steep 60-foot (18 m) incline above the flood plain made travel difficult, and the area showed no signs of urban development until just before the Civil War. Several notable families did own plantations in what is now called the Highlands, spurred by the Louisville and Bardstown Turnpike (today's Bardstown Road). The turnpike was first planned as early as 1784, but authorization to begin construction was delayed until 1819, and thwarted then by the Panic of 1819. Funds were finally allocated in 1829, with construction beginning in 1832.

Bardstown Road was originally a turnpike (with a macadamized surface), and tolls were collected at toll gates along the way. The portion of the road nearest to Louisville was free, so as Louisville grew, the first gatehouse moved further out. The earliest was at Beargrass Creek; it then moved to what is now the intersection of Broadway and Baxter, and subsequently to what is today Patterson and Bardstown, then to Eastern Parkway and Bardstown by 1873. It was at Speed Avenue by 1901, when the turnpike was sold to the city. The second tollgate was permanently located near today's Bashford Manor Lane and Bardstown.

While the landowners were families of English descent, many of the first residents during the agricultural days were Germans, which gave the area the nickname New Hamburg. Large-scale residential development in the area did not begin until a streetcar line extended to the area near the present-day intersection of Bardstown and Baxter in the 1890s. Nearby Cave Hill Cemetery (which doubled as park) and Cherokee Park provided recreation for the new residents.

Many businesses formed along the turnpike, with residential development back off the main road. The growth would creep down Bardstown Road as the streetcar lines continued to be extended. By the 1930s, the entire area today called the Highlands had been developed. The streetcars last ran down Bardstown Road on Derby Day 1947, and were replaced by buses.

=== Late 20th century ===
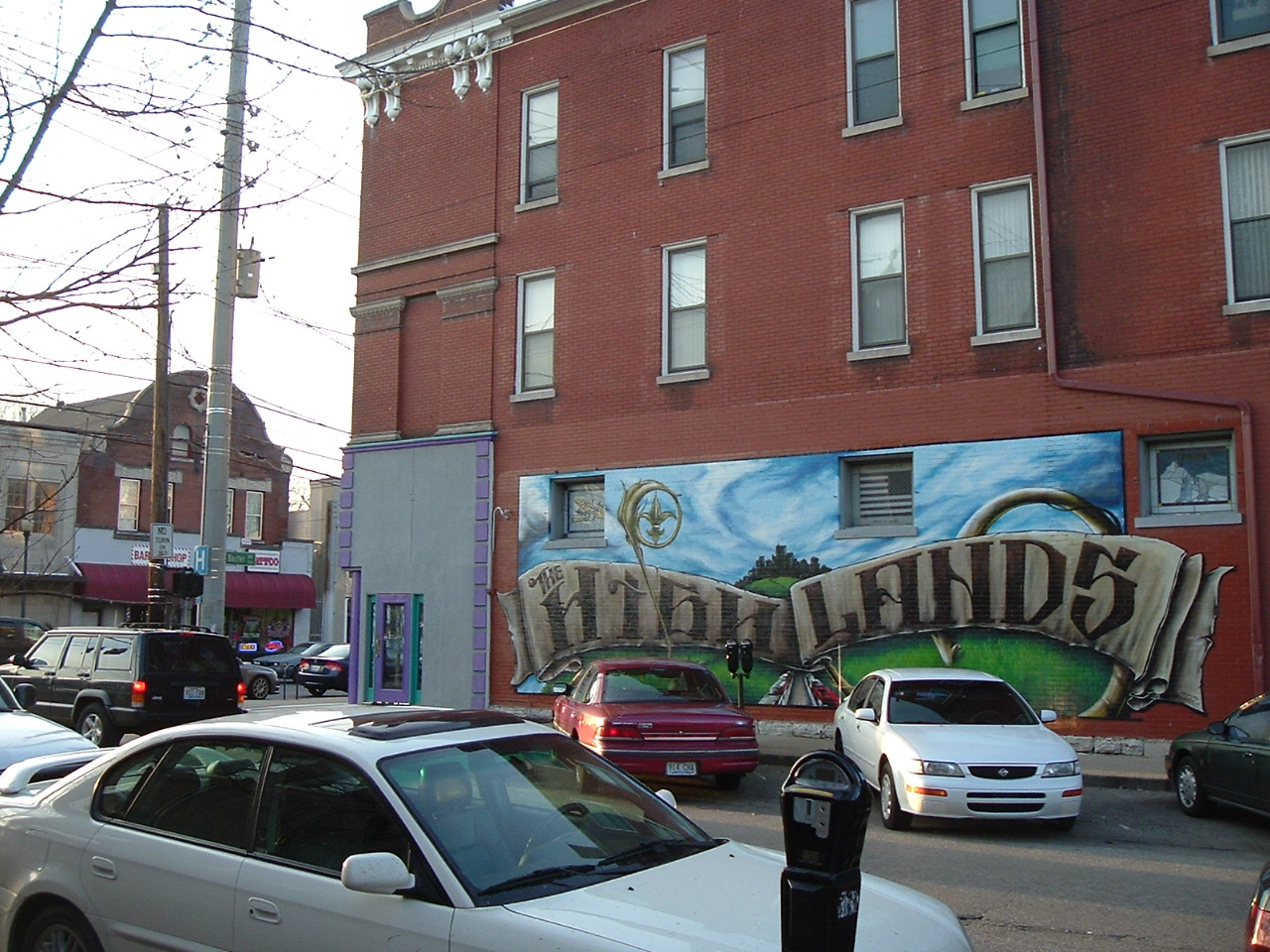
A wall mural at the intersection of Baxter Ave and Highland Ave

The area would continue to thrive until the 1960s, when some of the wealthier residents left for the suburbs. The main business corridor along Bardstown Road suffered, with residents expressing serious concerns about its quality in 1974. Of particular concern was the neglected Mid-City Mall, with frequent complaints about crime and its deteriorated appearance due to lack of maintenance. Four neighborhood associations organized a boycott of the mall starting in February 1975, and partly as a result, foreclosure on the mall began in late 1976. It was placed in receivership in 1977, and the mall has been considerably improved in the following decades.

The cooperation that led to the boycott created a strong community sentiment that the right changes could be made along the business corridor. Many older buildings had been razed already to make space for more modern fast-food restaurants and drive-in banks, and there was concern that nothing would remain eventually of the streetcar suburb era corridor. This led to the creation of the Highlands Commerce Guild in 1977.

The Highlands area would begin to rebound commercially in the 1980s as antique shops and other "oddity" stores moved to Bardstown Road for the many vacant store fronts which were located right off the street and for the area's elegant architecture. Many young professionals were also attracted to the area for its location near downtown and amenities such as Cherokee Park and pedestrian-friendly shopping. By the early 1990s the area had become the city's main nightclub and upscale restaurant district, as well as the cultural center for the city's music and gay scene. Today many of its neighborhoods have among the highest percentage of college graduates and average income in Louisville. Neighborhood income and education levels are highest in the areas farthest from the city center, and gradually decrease heading toward downtown. The gentrification of the Highlands has also had a spillover effect on adjacent areas such as Butchertown and Clifton, as they developed their own upscale club and shopping districts.

In the 2000s, the Highlands has continued to thrive, as several new mixed-use developments and additional restaurants have been established. An area of contention with some residents is whether there is too great a density of bars and nightclubs, particularly in the 900 block of Baxter Avenue. In 2004, some residents of the Original Highlands threatened a wet–dry vote to prevent more bars (in particular, The Monkey Wrench) from opening along Barret Avenue; they also sought stricter enforcement of rules regarding the percentage of revenue made from alcohol sales, which is designed to prevent a high density of bars in a given area. This followed complaints of increased vandalism and crime, as well as complaints that many of the patrons were parking on residential streets. After an increase in police patrols, the problems ceased and talk of the vote ended.

== Attractions ==
The Highlands area had a population of about 14,236 when the Census Bureau last took count in 2010. The population consists mostly of people from the ages of 20–39 years old. The area tailors itself to these demographics. Highlands consists of Bardstown Road all the way to Baxter Avenue. Due to its large collection of night clubs and restaurants, it is locally known as "Restaurant Row".

=== Streetcar loops ===
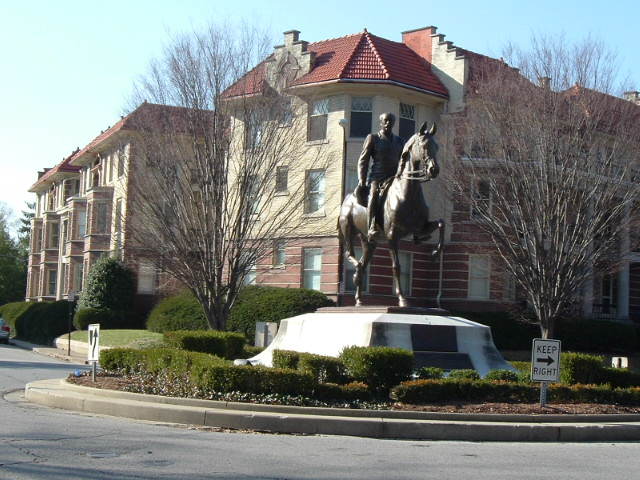
John Castleman Statue in a Cherokee Road roundabout, a Highlands landmark before removal in 2020

The Bardstown Road streetcar line ran until 1947 and was gradually extended farther out as the neighborhood expanded. The densest commercial areas in the Highlands were located along these stops, though many of the buildings at the older ones have since been razed, and the density is less evident:

- Highland and Baxter Avenue
- Grinstead and Bardstown Road
- Eastern Parkway and Bardstown
- Bonnycastle and Bardstown (the loop passed through what is now the parking garage behind the Doo Wop Shop)
- Douglass and Bardstown (the Douglass Loop)
- Taylorsville and Bardstown

=== Theatres ===
Before the era of multiplexes, small single-screen theatres dominated. Several in Louisville were located along Bardstown Road and were popular sources of entertainment in the Highlands for decades.

- Baxter (later called the Airway). 1055 Bardstown Road. Housed The Brycc House in the late 1990s, now home to a Buffalo Wild Wings
- The Cherokee. 1591 Bardstown Road. Now the site of Bombay International Grocery
- Bard. 2470 Bardstown Road. Razed.
- Highland (later called Shibboleth Hall). 1014–1016 Bardstown Road. Razed.
- Highland Amusement Co. (later called The Gem). 919 Baxter Avenue. Razed.
- Savoy Airdome. 1014 Bardstown Road. Razed.
- Uptown. 1508 Bardstown Road. Part of the Schuster Building, which still stands and is in use, although much of the portion which housed the theatre was razed in the late 1990s for a parking lot. Part of the theatre's facade, including the ticket window, is recognizable in the Qdoba restaurant.

From 1996 to 2025, the Highlands had an 8-screen multiplex—Baxter Avenue Filmworks (previously, Baxter Avenue Theatres)—located in Mid-City Mall.

== Neighborhoods ==
Map showing the areas in the Highlands

- Original Highlands
- Phoenix Hill (the eastern 1/3)
- Irish Hill
- Cherokee Triangle
- Tyler Park
- Deer Park
- Bonnycastle
- Highlands-Douglass
- Belknap

=== Upper Highlands ===
Several small cities further southwest on Bardstown Road define themselves as the Upper Highlands, and had sixth-class city status before Kentucky radically simplified its city classification system in 2015:

- Strathmoor Manor
- Strathmoor Village
- Wellington
- Kingsley

== Newspapers and media ==
- The Highlander Neighborhood Monthly—monthly newspaper published 2006–14

== See also ==
- Farmington
- Bellarmine University
- Sullivan University
- Hogan's Fountain Pavilion
- Cityscape of Louisville, Kentucky
- Geography of Louisville, Kentucky
- List of attractions and events in the Louisville metropolitan area
- National Register of Historic Places listings in The Highlands, Louisville, Kentucky
