= The Brick House =

Former social center in Louisville, Kentucky

- Founded: 1999
- Type: Non-profit
- Location: Louisville, Kentucky, United States
- Website: The Brycc House

The Brick House (also known as The Brycc House) was a social center in Louisville, Kentucky that was inspired by and modeled upon ABC No Rio in New York City. The Brycc House was organized in "Do-It-Yourself" (DIY) volunteer working groups to support community based projects. The project contained groups in areas that worked with art, music, bike repairs, radio station, photography, internet access, comics, gardening, power saving practices, entrepreneurship, a lending library, a free clothing closet, and maintenance of the building.

== Highlands ==
The Old Brycc House location on Bardstown Road in the Highlands neighborhood

The Brycc House began as the Bardstown Road Youth Cultural Center (or BRYCC). The Brycc House was born in 1999 when Bill Allison, a candidate for Third Ward Alderman, met with the staff of Brat Magazine to discuss their concerns about city government and youth issues. One of the things that the Brat staff wanted was a youth-run youth center. The first BRYCC House building would be located on Bardstown Road (38°14′21.5″N 85°43′19.4″W), the north end which is a major pedestrian-oriented commercial and residential district in Louisville. Allison agreed that this would be a good idea since many voters and constituents had expressed concerns about juveniles wandering the streets. With different views on the topic about the juveniles it was decided by the staff to help give them a place for the youth. Allison promised to get money for the center if the Brat staff would put together a proposal and form a nonprofit corporation to run the center.

Bill Allison would help the organization become nonprofit. BRYCC House Inc. (Bardstown Road Youth Cultural Center) was formed in 1999 and obtained IRS 501(c)(3) status shortly thereafter. After several months of searching, the group found a building across from an old theater turned antique store on Bardstown Road in the Highlands neighborhood and opened the BRYCC House as a community youth center.

BRYCC House successfully supported a variety of community projects: an Internet radio station; a lending library and zine collection; a visual arts studio with darkroom facilities; a public performance space for music, theater, film and more; a community computer lab and meeting space for community groups; host to regional and national conferences and much more. Several community organizations shared office and work space, such as KFTC-Kentuckians for the Commonwealth and Food Not Bombs.

Even with the grant money from the city of Louisville and donations, paying the extraordinary rent was difficult and the center chose to put on music shows constantly for some time to meet expenses. Eventually the BRYCC House would close its doors in 2001 due to financial situations. The organizers of the center would later consider attempting to purchase the location rather than paying rent, but then later decided to seek a new location.

== Old Louisville ==
In late 2002 another building was purchased in the centrally located Old Louisville neighborhood (38°14′12.8″N 85°45′22.7″W). Following the purchase, the BRYCC House became known as just the Brick House Community Center since it was no longer located on Bardstown Road. After the opening one of the new key developments was the attraction of a variety of ages rather just young people.

Projects at the new building included a bicycle repair workshop, a freeshop, an infoshop and a meeting room. There was also a radio station, periodic punk rock shows and political forums.

The first few weeks of reopening were difficult following several burglaries and thefts and the center never rebounded. At this point, the Board of Directors was almost completely different from the original founding board, and the building slowly fell into disrepair and disuse. By 2008, the venue was closed down and replaced by projects such as Skull Alley.

== Conventions and other major events ==
As a part of their mission, the BRYCC House organized and hosted numerous large-scale events and conventions, including the Southern Girls Convention, Independent Festival of Education, IWW National Conference, Permanent Autonomous Zone PAZ Conference, Insomniacathon, Bike Bike SE featuring a community bike ride, an art show, a day for mountaintop removal awareness, a burlesque show, and additional music concerts and plays.
