= Deer Park, Louisville =

Deer Park
- Louisville neighborhood
- Interactive map of Deer Park
- Coordinates: 38°13′24″N 85°42′21″W
- Country: United States
- State: Kentucky
- City: Louisville
- Districts: 8

Government
  - Council member: Cassie Armstrong
- ZIP code(s): 40205
- Area code(s): 502
- Website: www.deerparklouisville.com

Deer Park is a neighborhood four miles southeast of downtown Louisville, Kentucky, USA. Most of the neighborhood was developed from 1890 through the 1920s as a streetcar suburb.All but six of its 24 subdivisions being developed by 1917, and the last laid out by 1935, although some development west of Norris Place continued after World War II.

Deer Park's boundaries are Bardstown Road, Newburg Road, Eastern Parkway and Douglass Boulevard. Deer Park is considered a part of a larger area of Louisville called The Highlands.

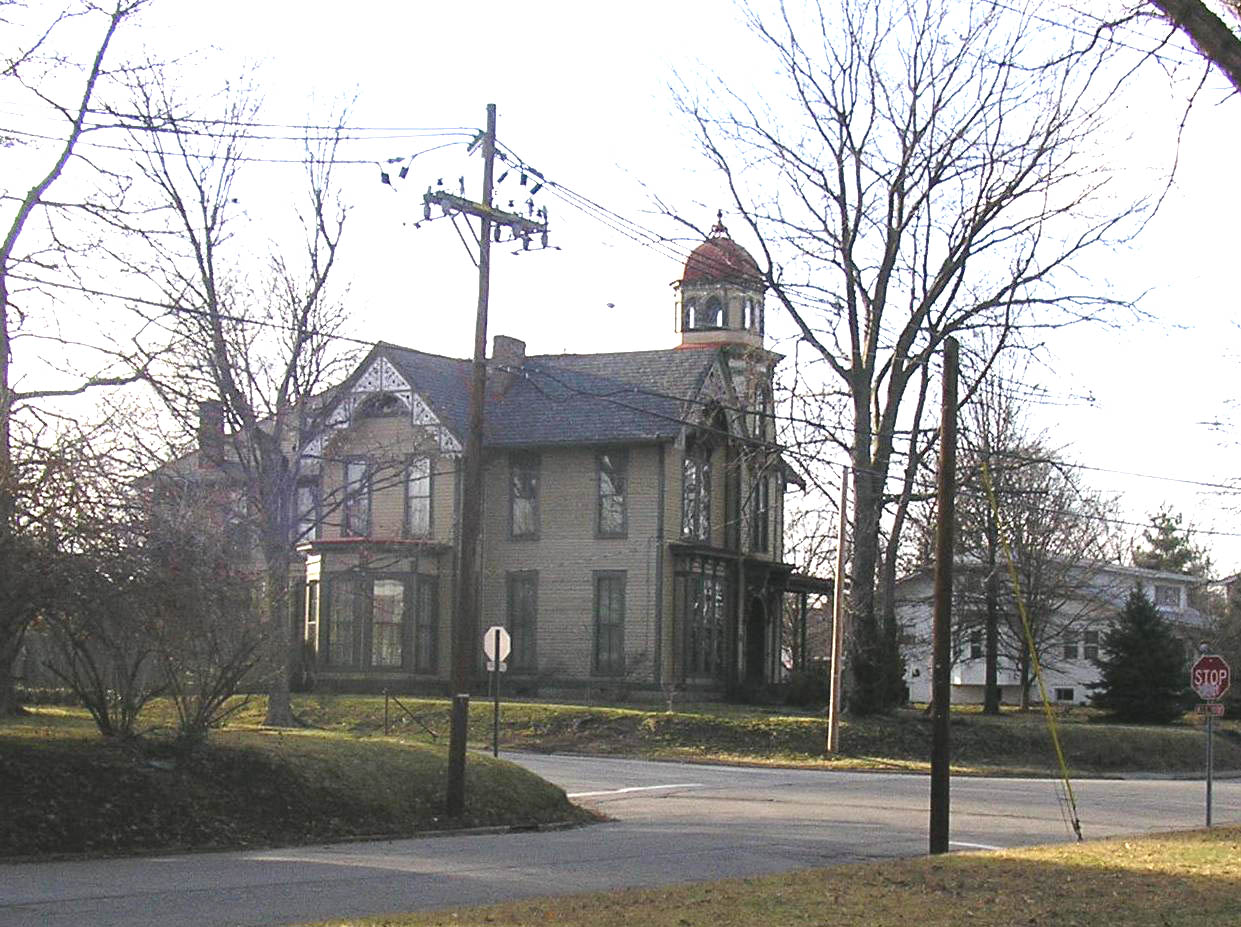
Historic Bullock Clifton house, built in 1834

Prior to subdivision, it was agricultural. The origin of the name is not entirely clear, although recent campaigns to "put the deer back in Deer Park" have seen colorful deer sculptures placed at local businesses, parodying a Louisville-wide campaign with larger horse sculptures placed similarly.

== Schools and landmarks ==
The neighborhood is largely residential. Most businesses and other non-residential buildings are found along Norris Place, Bardstown Road, and Newburg Road. These facilities include Highland Middle School and the King's Daughters and Sons Home, an institute for the ill and disabled opened in 1909 and renamed Highlands Nursing Home in the early 2000s. Other schools in the neighborhood include the Catholic primary schools St. Francis and St. Agnes, and the DePaul School, a private school for students with dyslexia and other specific learning differences.

Bellarmine University is located on the Belknap side of the boundary between that neighborhood and Deer Park; until the 21st century, Deer Park residents had little contact with the university other than its function as a polling place during the elections. As the university has sought to expand its student base and campus, residents residing the closest to the university met with Bellarmine representatives on an ad hoc basis to address areas of concern such as street, rather than campus parking, and the building of a stadium near houses on an adjoining street. The ad hoc nature of meeting with Bellarmine ceased in 2005 when there was a push by the university to buy houses on the Bellarmine side of Richmond Drive west of Norris and use them as student housing. This was opposed by Belknap and Deer Park residents and brought before the zoning commission. From this effort, the Good Neighbor Working Group was formed with Bellarmine to ensure their expansion and plans for growth did not adversely affect the integrity of the neighborhood.

A local landmark is the Bullock-Clifton House, also called the Yunker house, a former farmhouse built in 1834 and located at the corner of Richmond and Rosedale. The imposing structure was described in a 1980 study as "steamboat gothic," and is on the National Register of Historic Places. Early landowners included the Norris, Duker and Stevens families, after whom streets in the neighborhood are named. Two other streets are named after locations in Virginia (Richmond and Roanoke), and Hartman Avenue is named after developer George Hartman, who developed the area in 1914 on what was family property.

== Housing ==
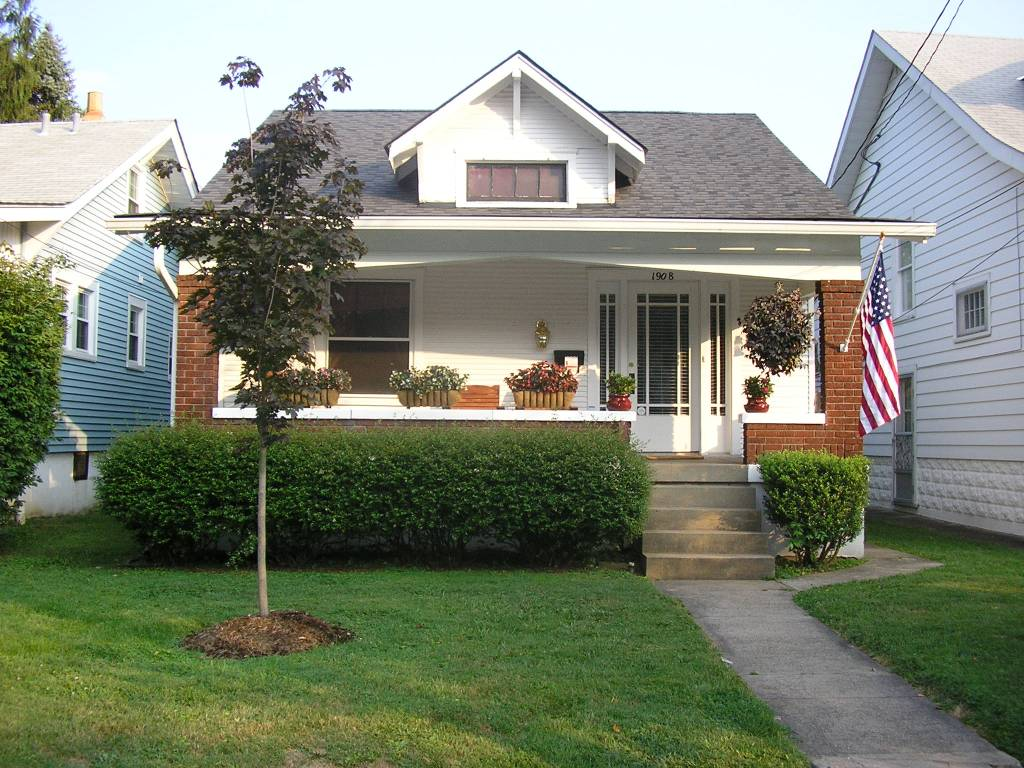
A typical side-gabled bungalow in Louisville's Deer Park Neighborhood

The area from Eastern Parkway to Speed Avenue and Fernwood to Bardstown Road is a National Register District, and is also one of the most densely populated areas in Louisville. Since the mid-1970s, all of the somewhat narrow east–west streets here have been one-way, an oddity for a neighborhood relatively far from downtown.

Further contributing to the unusually high density for a neighborhood mostly of single family homes, Deer Park includes two pedestrian courts whose long rows of houses, with no conventional street, are accessible only by alleys and sidewalks running through the short front yards. Ivanhoe Court was built in 1914, and the slightly smaller Maplewood Place a year later in 1915. These types of developments, built during the streetcar suburb era, are apparently unique to Louisville. There are 11 in Old Louisville, but outside of Deer Park only a few others remain today.

The neighborhood has long had more of a middle and working class reputation than surrounding Highlands neighborhoods, which range in character from upper-middle to outright upper class. The reason for this is primarily that Deer Park's housing stock is, other than the Yunker House, decidedly low-key. Due to the lack of geographical obstacles such as steep hills or creeks, the entire neighborhood was developed in a rather uniform and quick manner. Shotgun houses and 2½ story Victorians, more modest than those on the east side of Bardstown Road, make up the majority of the stock in the oldest sections, while modest craftsmen-style houses dominate streets further out, and a few small ranch style homes can be found west of Norris Place. In the north end near Douglass Boulevard is Forest Park, the last of the pre-World War II subdivisions, and the largest of any single development in Deer Park. Larger houses can be found here, many in various historical revival styles.

== Demographics ==
As of 2000, the population of Deer Park was 4,082, of which 93.7% are white, 3.6% are listed as other, 2% are black, and 0.7% are Hispanic. College graduates are 48.3% of the population, people without a high school degree are 8%. Females outnumber males 51.8% to 48.2%.
