= North of Bourbon =

Restaurant in Louisville, Kentucky, U.S.

- Interactive map of North of Bourbon

Restaurant information
- Established: December 31, 2021
- Food type: American Southern, with Cajun and Creole influences
- Location: 935 Goss Avenue, Louisville, Kentucky, 40217, United States
- Coordinates: 38.2296°N 85.7389°W
- Website: www.northofbourbon.com

North of Bourbon is a restaurant and bourbon bar in Louisville, Kentucky, in the Germantown neighborhood, opened in late 2021. It was included in The New York Times's 2024 list of the 50 best restaurants in the United States.

== Cuisine ==
North of Bourbon describes its menu as "inspired by our Chef and the owners’ Louisiana and Mississippi roots mixed with other classic southern dishes." Menu items range from boudin balls and catfish to Alabama red snapper ceviche, fried chicken gumbo and couvillion.

The New York Times lauded the restaurant's "cunning refinements to common dishes," such as "fried catfish set under a drift of chopped Haitian pikliz, and crab dressing sparked by cilantro and lime. The gumbo is as dark and enticing as what you’ll find in Cajun Country, only thick with smoked brisket and wilted greens."

North of Bourbon also offers more than 300 bourbon options, according to the restaurant, and a number of cocktails.

== Staff ==
Chef Brittany Kelly was tapped as executive chef in 2025, succeeding Lawrence Weeks, who was a James Beard Award semifinalist in 2024. Kelly worked with Weeks for years before his departure, and told The Courier Journal, "I've learned pretty much most of what I know from him." Kelly is a Kentucky native, and said her favorite dishes are those which draw on the "deep Southern cooking" of her upbringing.
