= Mid-City Mall =

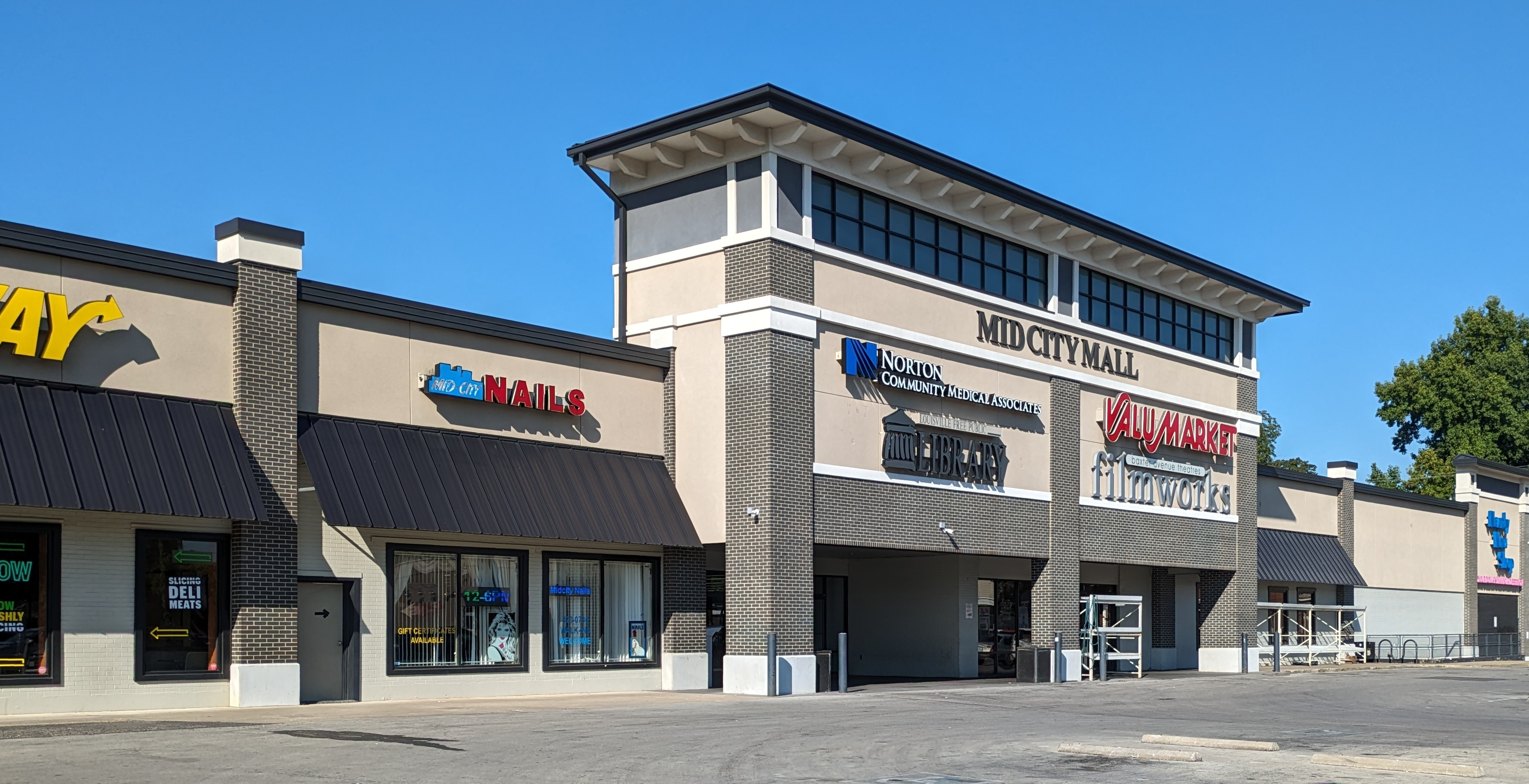
- Main facade of the mall
- Location: Louisville, Kentucky, United States
- Coordinates: 38°14′5″N 85°43′4″W
- Address: 1250 Bardstown Road
- Opened: December 6, 1962
- Closed: September 1,2026 (indoor)
- Owner: Sandy Metts
- Num. of stores: 22 (initially)
- Floor area: 180,000 square feet (17,000 m^{2})
- Floors: 2
- Parking: Surface lots
- Public transit: TARC

Mid City Mall was a shopping mall in Louisville, Kentucky's Highlands area. While called a mall, and containing an enclosed shopping area, it has features atypical of suburban American malls, such as a comedy club, bar, grocery store and public library. A 1994 article in Louisville's Courier-Journal newspaper argued that the mall could be considered the "crossroads" of Louisville, and described it as being "only part shopping center, because it is also community center, courthouse square and retirement-village rec room."

In November 2024, the 11.5-acre Mid City Mall property went up for sale, drawing proposals for redevelopment. Some filings in 2025 indicated plans for mixed-use development, including a grocery store.

== History ==
=== Development ===
Mid City Mall was built on the site of the German Protestant Orphan's Home, which was founded in 1851 and moved to the 10-acre (40,000 m^{2}) Highlands site in 1902. It remained there until 1962, but the structure and grounds were sold for $500,000 in 1959 to mall developers. The aging structure was demolished and the orphanage moved to Bardstown Road and Goldsmith Lane.

Developers then built what became Kentucky's second enclosed mall. The initial plan, unveiled in 1958, called for a $7.5 million, five-story mall with a pool in front on the Bardstown Road side and penthouse apartments on the top floor. The plan was gradually whittled down to a one-story plan with a lower level. The main developer of the project was Guy E. McGaughey Jr., an attorney from Lawrenceville, Illinois. The concept of an enclosed mall was very new; there were only a handful of them in the US at the time.

Construction began in March 1962 and the mall was completed in October of that year at a cost of $3 million. The shopping center formally opened on October 10, 1962, in a ribbon-cutting ceremony attended by Louisville Mayor William O. Cowger and Jefferson County Judge Marlow Cook. The mall contained 180,000 square feet (17,000 m^{2}) of leasable space and 22 stores.

=== Initial years ===
McGaughey played an active role in the mall's early years. He personally managed the Office Lounge and was arrested by the police in 1963 for drunkenness, in what he called a shakedown. On June 21, 1964, an early morning fire that started in the Cherokee Book and Card Stop (also owned by McGaughey) caused $200,000 (equivalent to $2,103,261 in 2025) in damage to the mall. In 1965, police investigated after mall tenants complained of pinball machines in the lobby. In 1968, McGaughey was convicted of battery of a former waitress at the Office Lounge. He was convicted of allowing after-hours drinking in 1968, and in 1969 a judge ordered the Office Lounge and bowling alley closed over fire hazards. He was sued by the IRS in 1971 for not paying his taxes in the 1960s, and by investors in the mall in 1972 for diverting lease revenue from mall tenants to himself rather than paying investors. McGaughey settled the lawsuits but began to fall behind on mortgage payments and stopped paying for maintenance of the mall.

=== Bankruptcy and renewal ===
By the mid-1970s, the Bardstown Road corridor was in decline, and local leaders saw the sprawling mall as the epicenter of the problems. Complaints about crime, poor maintenance and deterioration of the structure were common. To force improvements to the mall, the surrounding neighborhood associations banded together and started a boycott of the mall in February 1975. Partially as a result of the boycott, the mall went into foreclosure in Fall 1976, and receivership on January 1, 1977. By the end of the 1970s the mall was sold to the Metts family, who were more willing to improve the property and work with neighborhood leaders. Inspired by the successful efforts to force positive change in the Mid City Mall situation, many who were involved formed the Highlands Commerce Guild in 1977, which continues to work to revitalize the Bardstown Road corridor as of 2007.

Shortly after the change of ownership, land was leased to allow construction of restaurants in the part of the parking lot nearest Bardstown Road. The Skyline Chili remains but the other location began as Gatti's Pizza in 1979, became a Dairy Queen in 1997, and Raising Cane's Chicken Fingers in 2015. In 1988, a study of traffic along Bardstown Road found that the road in front of Mid-City Mall had by far the most vehicle accidents of any mid-block area from downtown to Bardstown Road's junction with I-264, mostly due to drivers turning left from the mall. It suggested the number of entrances to the mall be reduced and one large one created, where a traffic light would be installed, and this recommendation was carried out 1989.

The mall entered into another decline in 1990 when Ames (formerly Zayre), an anchor store, moved out. The decline did not last long, as new businesses began moving in by mid-decade, which was marked by a $400,000 renovation of the facade in 1994. The former Ames site was converted to an 8-screen cinema originally called Baxter Avenue Theaters and later known as Baxter Avenue Filmworks, which opened in 1996. Baxter Avenue Filmworks closed on December 31, 2025.

A controversial element of the renovation were backless benches designed to deter people from sleeping in the mall. While the "bums" of Mid City Mall were notorious at the time, many were not actually homeless and some had been regularly visiting the mall for recreation for decades.

== Features ==
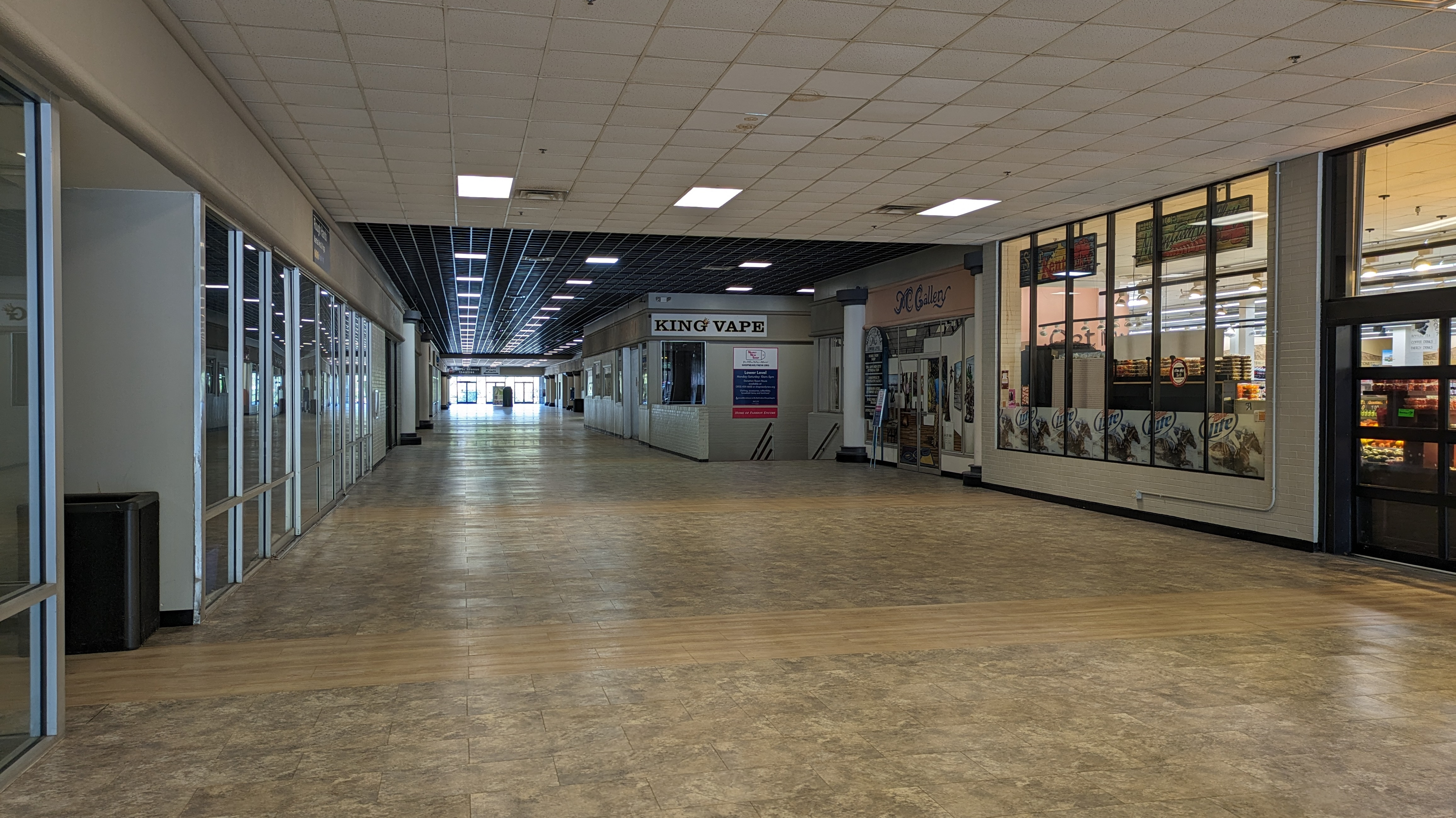
Interior

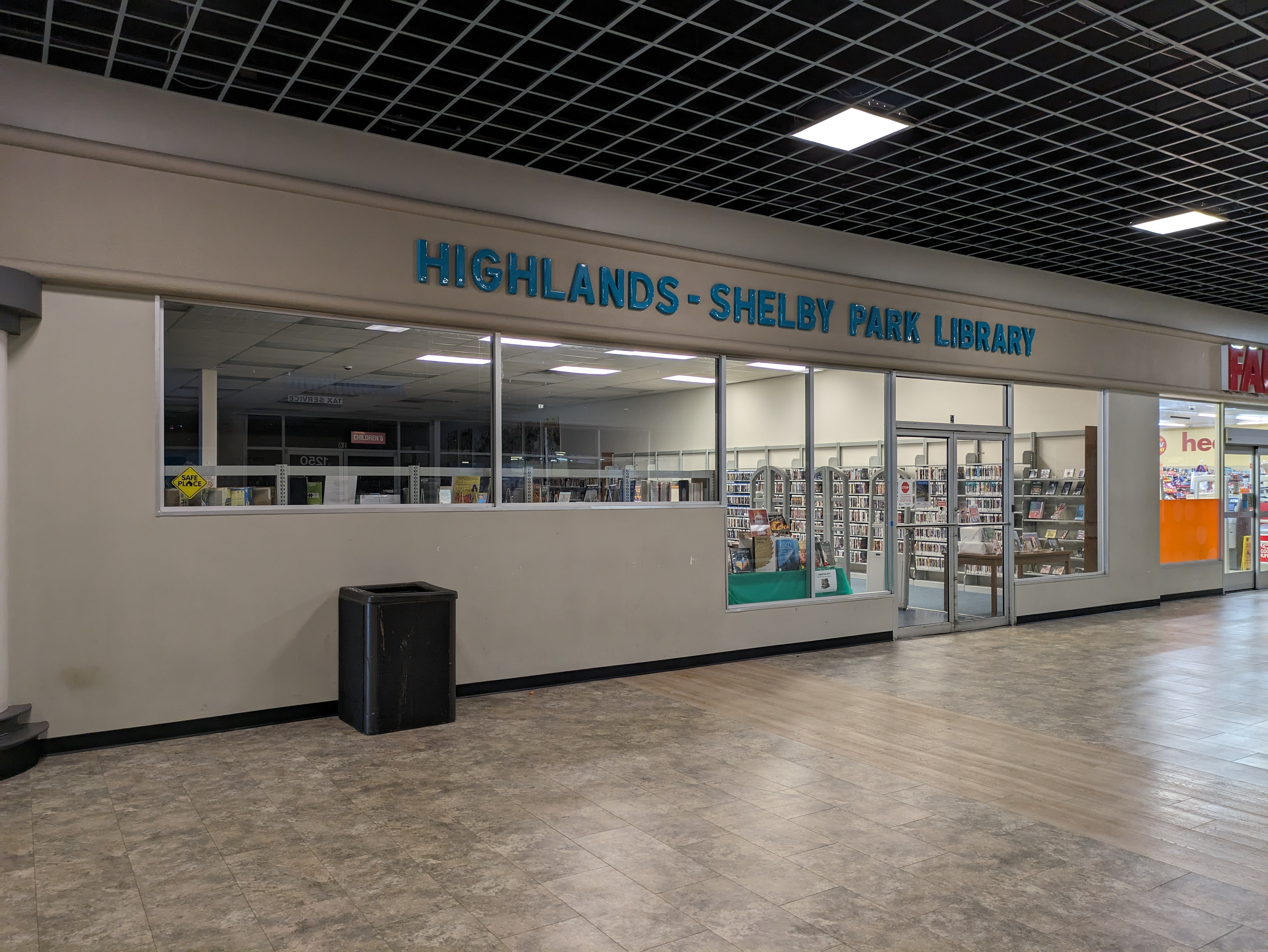
Highlands-Shelby Park Library branch in the mall

Several of the mall's initial tenants were long-running local businesses. The Jewel Box, which opened in 1958 moved into the mall at its opening, until its closure in 2022. It is now the Jewelry Emporium, under a new owner. The mall had been the home of Ehrmann's, a bakery in existence since the 19th century. The bakery closed its doors in 2003.

Another tenant who was there from the beginning was a Winn-Dixie grocery store on the Bardstown Road side. When the grocery chain pulled out of the Louisville market, the location was later occupied by another grocery chain called Buehler's Market. The company only lasted there a year and eventually became a Valu Market grocery.

Several other established local businesses moved into the mall as initial tenants, including Maud Muller Candy Shop, Marianne Shop and Taylor Drugstore. A large bar, which has a separate entrance, was home to the Office Lounge from the mall's founding until 1975. In 1987 the space was taken over by a new bar, The Back Door, which closed suddenly in 2024.

In 1987, a comedy club called the Funny Farm opened in a space that had previously been Noble Roman's and then Nick's Restaurant. The Funny Farm space has remained a comedy club, going through several name changes, most recently The Laughing Derby at Comedy Caravan.

In 1988, a large charity shop called the Nearly-New Shop moved to the mall's basement, in a location that had previously been a roller skating rink. The Nearly New Shop closed in September 2025 and returned as "Nearly New 2 U" in December 2025. In the late 1970s and early 1980s the basement featured the Derby Bowl bowling alley, which included a bar and game room. The east side of the basement, across from the Nearly New Shop, has featured a fitness gym, Jim Cain's Mid-City Fitness, which also closed.

Two branches of the Louisville Free Public Library merged and moved into the mall in 1993, occupying a space that had once been a Thrifty Dollar store.
