= Germantown, Louisville =

Germantown
- Louisville neighborhood
- Interactive map of Germantown
- Coordinates: 38°13′28″N 85°44′12″W
- Country: United States
- State: Kentucky
- City: Louisville
- Districts: 6, 15

Government
  - Councilpeople: Phillip Baker, Jennifer Chappell

Area
  - Total: 0.602 sq mi (1.56 km^{2})

Population (2010)
  - Total: 4,114
  - Density: 6,830/sq mi (2,640/km^{2})
- ZIP code(s): 40204, 40205, 40217
- Area code(s): 502

Germantown is a neighborhood three miles southeast of downtown Louisville, Kentucky, USA. Germantown is also a general term for an area of Louisville from the Original Highlands to St Joseph and Bradley neighborhoods that were predominantly settled by Germans. The actual neighborhood is roughly bounded by Barrett Ave, Eastern Parkway, Goss Ave, and the South Fork of Beargrass Creek.

== History ==
The area was settled as small farms and butcher shops by German immigrants in the 1870s. At this time the area was nicknamed 'Frogtown' because the adjacent Beargrass Creek frequently flooded the area, causing numerous epidemics of malaria. The flooding problem was solved when Beargrass Creek was routed into a much deeper concrete canal. The area was subdivided and developed heavily during the 1890s, when the largest collection of shotgun houses in the city of Louisville was built.

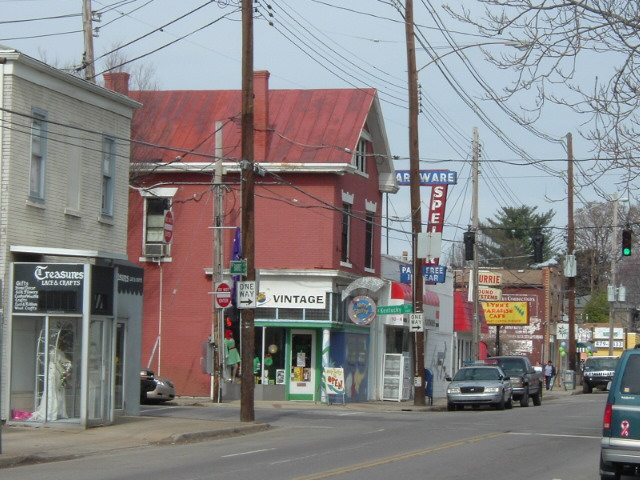
Barrett Avenue in Germantown

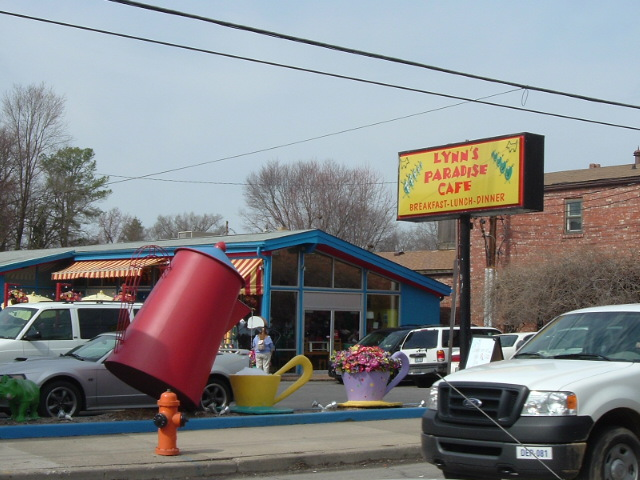
Lynn's Paradise Cafe in Germantown, now closed

In 1907, a bridge was built across the South Fork of Beargrass Creek which allowed French settlers north of the creek, in an area called Paristown, to attend the one Catholic church in the area.

The German-Paristown Neighborhood Association was founded in 1973, making it one of Louisville's first neighborhood associations.

Today the area is undergoing a transition to a younger, more educated demographic. Many homes in the neighborhood are being renovated and urban homesteading (complete with gardens, bee hives, and backyard chickens) is common.

== Demographics ==
As of 2000, the population of Germantown was 3,867, of which 93.9% are white, 4.2% are black, 1.6% are listed as other, and 0.7% are Hispanic. College graduates are of the 17.9% population, people without a high school degree are 29.3%. Females outnumber males 52.9% to 47.1%.

== See also ==
- North of Bourbon
- Butchertown, Louisville
- History of the Germans in Louisville
