= Original Highlands, Louisville =

Coordinates: 38.22730°N 85.70830°W

- Highlands Historic District
- U.S. National Register of Historic Places
- U.S. Historic district
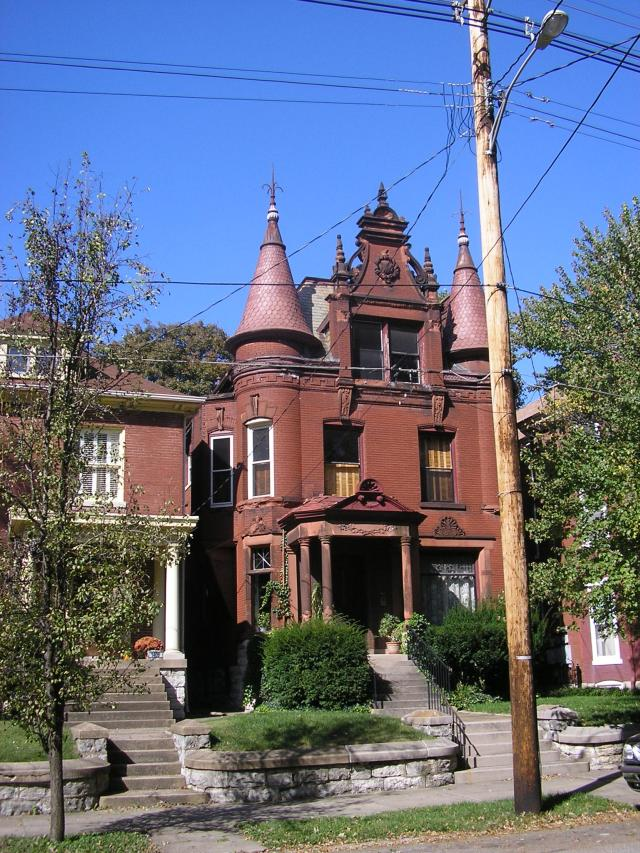
- An example of the elaborate home architecture found in the Original Highlands

- Location within Kentucky Location within the United States
- Location: Louisville, Kentucky
- Architectural style: Late Victorian
- NRHP reference No.: 83002680
- Added to NRHP: February 11, 1983

Historical population
Census	Pop.	Note	%±
1990	1,860		—
2000	1,798		−3.3%
2010	1,680		−6.6%

The Original Highlands is a historic neighborhood in the Highlands area of Louisville, Kentucky, United States.

== History ==
The neighborhood was built on land surveyed in 1774 and granted to Colonial William Preston, surveyor of Fincastle County, Virginia. He died in 1781, and eventually his son, Major William Preston, and wife moved onto the land in 1814 and established a plantation called the "Briar Patch". The 1819 construction of the Louisville and Bardstown Turnpike (now Bardstown Road) would eventually lead to many people moving to the area. Before the American Civil War the area was agricultural and attracted many German immigrants, and was known as New Hamburg.

Formal subdivision began after the land was inherited by Preston's daughter, Susan Preston Christy (after whom Christy Avenue is named). In 1869, Sydney J. Rogers subdivided Hepburn Avenue between Barrett and Baxter. Interest in the neighborhood picked up with the extension of a horse-drawn streetcar line to Highland Avenue in 1871. The next subdivision was Hughes Addition, starting in 1875. Much of the rest of the land was subdivided by William Preston Johnson by 1891. The last was the Barr Subdivision in 1896.

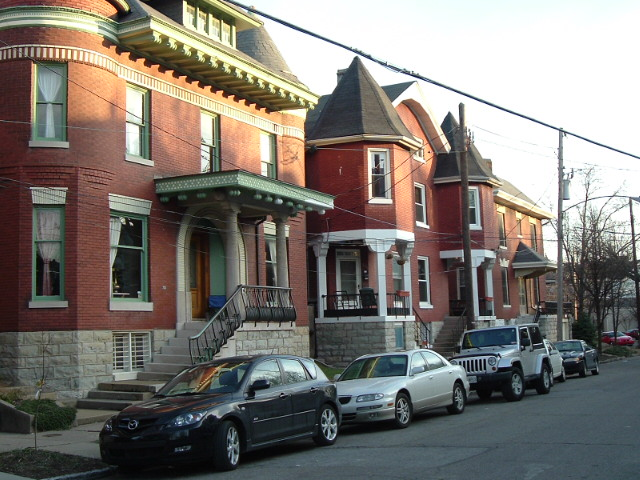
Rubel Ave in the Original Highlands

Popularity was further increased by the establishment of Cherokee Park in 1891. Almost all of the land was developed by 1895. The vast majority of houses in the Original Highlands were constructed between 1860 and 1895, especially in the last 11 years of that period, during which 600 were built. The dwellings from before 1884 were mostly located along Breckinridge (formerly Howard), Christy, Baxter and Barret.

The area was simply called the Highlands because it sits on a ridge between the middle and south forks of Beargrass Creek, above the Ohio River flood plain. Today eight other neighborhoods in the area on the same ridge are also collectively called The Highlands. The Original Highlands name has developed to distinguish it from these neighborhoods; the Highlands sometimes specifically refers to this neighborhood.

== Architecture ==
The architecture of the neighborhood is a mixture of large, wood framed and brick Victorian houses and working class shotgun houses, which often sit right next to each other.

== Contemporary history ==
In recent years the area has attracted many professionals because of its proximity to downtown and the Baxter Avenue/Bardstown Road and Barret Avenue commercial corridors which include arts galleries, eclectic shopping, and night life.

National Products, a small factory at the corner of Breckinridge Street and Baxter Avenue, produces more disco balls than any other factory in the world. The stretch of Baxter Avenue between Highland Avenue and Broadway is known as one of Louisville's most popular destinations with its mix of bars, restaurants, galleries and shops. The Barret Avenue commercial corridor is an emerging art zone due to the large number of galleries.

The neighborhood is home to the Original Highlands Art and Music Festival. Held on Baxter Avenue each September, the festival features local and national music acts along with art and vendor booths.

The neighborhood is also host to the annual Highlands Louisville Halloween Parade, Louisville Zombie Attack and Ancient Order of Hibernians St. Patrick's Day Parade.

The area is also well known for its numerous dining establishments, giving it the nickname "Restaurant Row".

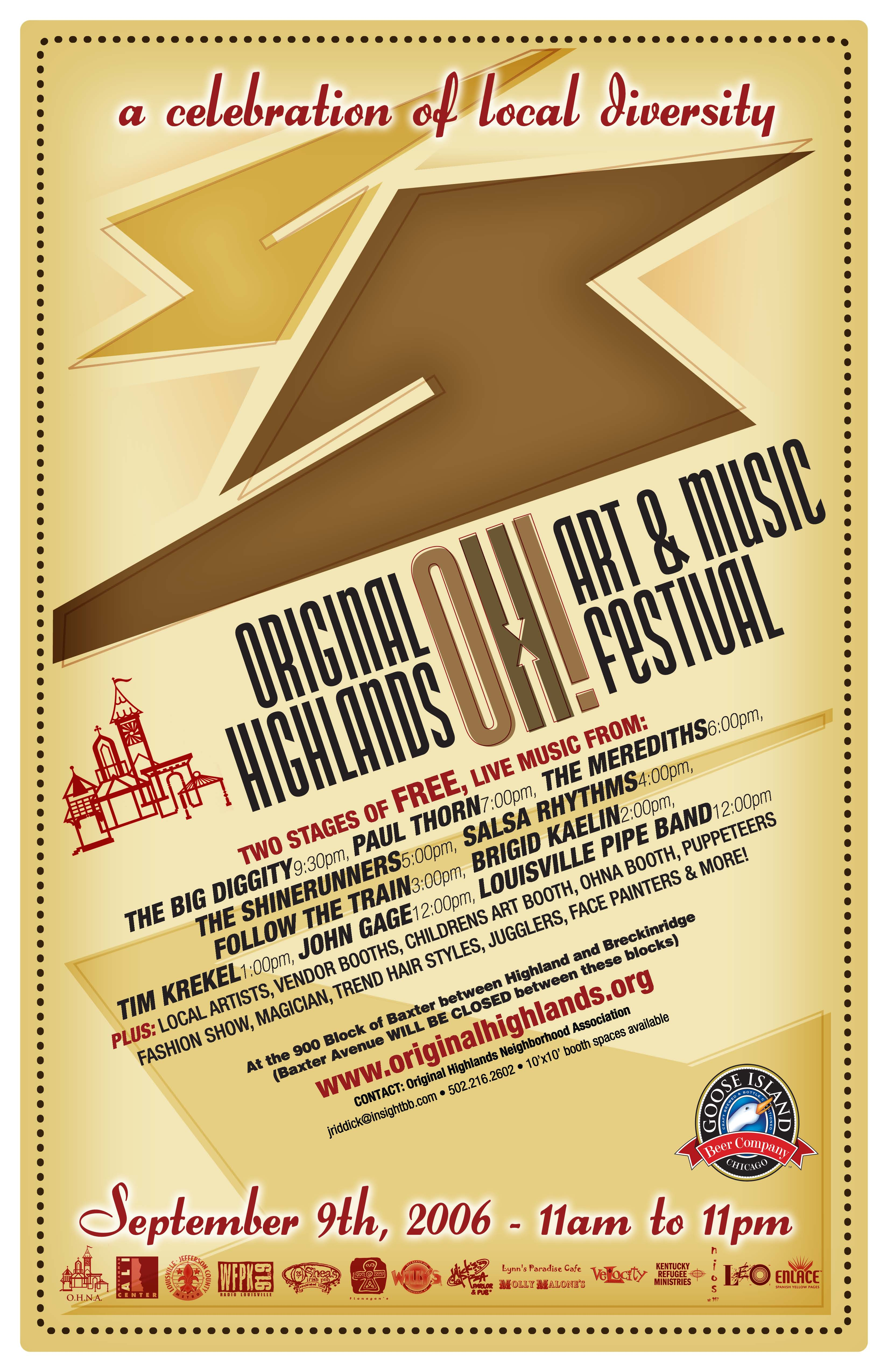
The 2006 Original Highlands Art & Music Festival Poster

The Original Highlands' boundaries are East Broadway on the north, Bardstown Road/Baxter Avenue on the east, Rufer Avenue on the south and Barret Avenue on the west. The Original Highlands Neighborhood Association also works closely with residents on Ellwood Avenue, located just to the south of Winter Avenue.

== Demographics ==
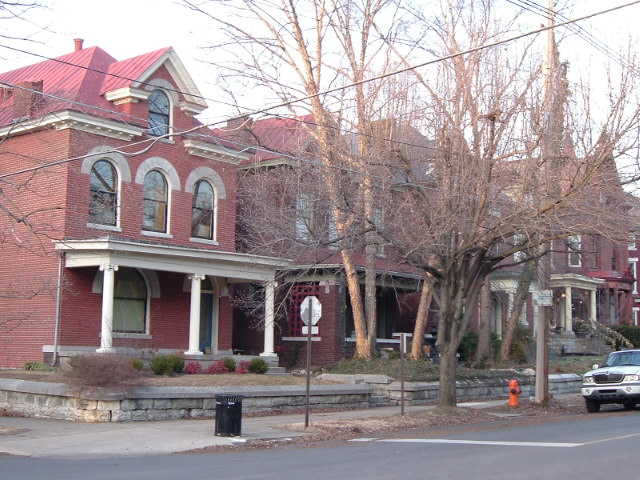
Highland Ave in the Original Highlands

As of 2000, the population of the Original Highlands was 1,580, of which 89.4% are white, 6.8% are listed as other, 2.7% are black, and 1.1% are Hispanic. College graduates are of the 34.3% population, people without a high school degree are 12.6%. Males outnumber females 53.7% to 46.3%.

== See also ==
- History of Louisville, Kentucky
- National Register of Historic Places listings in Jefferson County, Kentucky
- List of attractions and events in the Louisville metropolitan area
