= Clifton, Louisville =

Neighborhood in Louisville, Kentucky, US

Coordinates: 38°15′19.26″N 85°42′56.86″W

- Clifton Historic District
- U.S. National Register of Historic Places
- U.S. Historic district
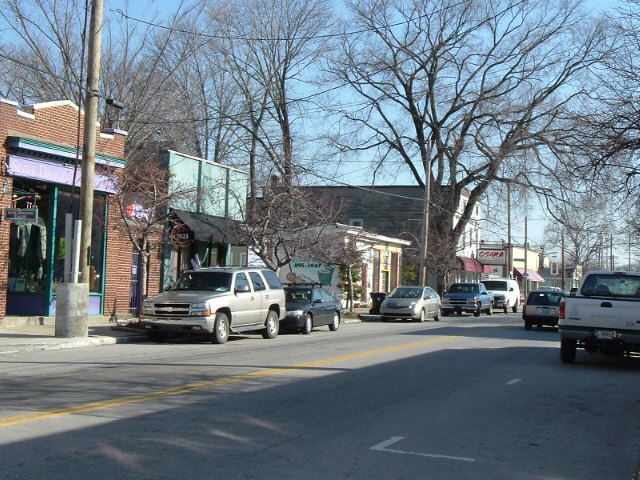
- Frankfort Ave in Clifton

- Location within Kentucky Location within the United States
- Location: Roughly bounded by Brownsboro Rd., William and E. Main Sts., Frankfort and N. Ewing Aves., Louisville, Kentucky
- Area: 169 acres (68 ha)
- Built: 1870
- Architectural style: Italianate, Queen Anne, Classical Revival
- NRHP reference No.: 83002649
- Added to NRHP: August 29, 1983

Clifton is a neighborhood east of downtown Louisville, Kentucky, US. Clifton was named because of its hilly location on the Ohio River valley escarpment. Clifton is bounded by I-64, N Ewing Ave, Brownsboro Road, and Mellwood Ave.

== History ==
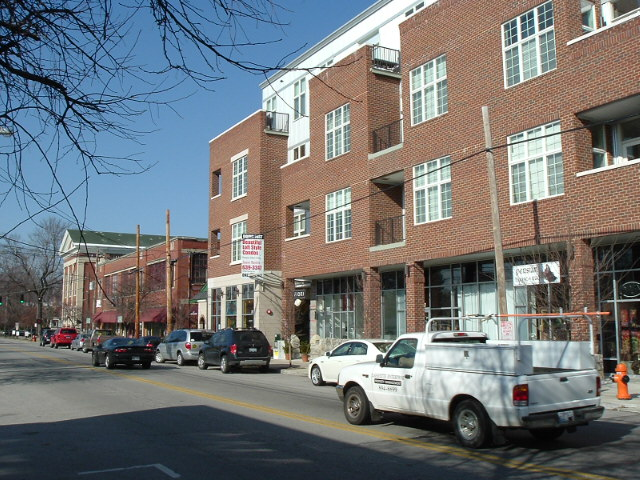
New Condos in Clifton

Unlike other Louisville neighborhoods, Clifton was developed over a period of 60 years, with the first homes built in the 1860s sitting next to homes built in the 1910s, although nearly all homes were built in Victorian styles. Its residential areas are also much less dense than other nearby areas like Butchertown or the Original Highlands. The Louisville and Lexington toll pike, which is now called Frankfort Avenue, went through the heart of the area and was lined with small shops.

The area began to revitalize in the 1990s, as numerous restaurants, boutiques, and antique shops opened up along Frankfort Avenue. Area attractions include the Kentucky School for the Blind and the American Printing House for the Blind.

== Demographics ==
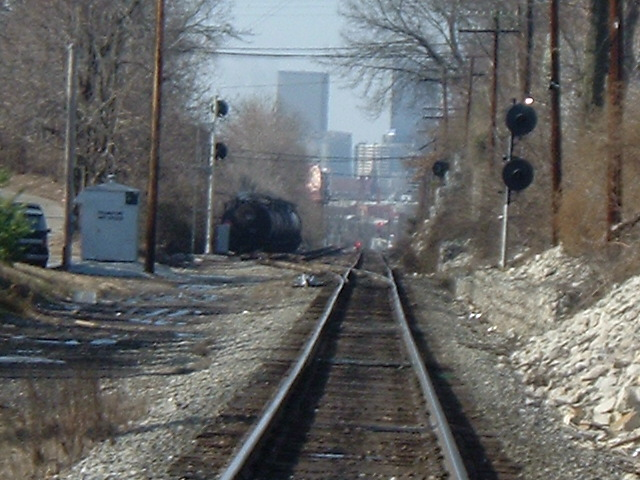
View of Downtown Louisville from railroad tracks in Clifton

As of 2000, the population of Clifton was 2,469, of which whites are 87.2%, blacks are 8.1%, people listed as other are 2.2%, and Hispanics are 2%. College graduates are 32.1% of the population, people without a high school degree are 22%. Females outnumber males 53.1% to 46.9%.

== See also ==
- List of attractions and events in the Louisville metropolitan area
