= List of Kentucky locations by per capita income =

Kentucky is the fortieth richest state in the United States of America, with a per capita income of $26,779 (2017).

== Kentucky Counties by Per Capita Income ==
Note: Data is from the 2010 United States Census Data and the 2006-2010 American Community Survey 5-Year Estimates.

Rank	County	Per capita income	Median household income	Median family income	Population	Number of households
1	Oldham	$32,702	$79,417	$89,911	60,316	19,431
2	Boone	$28,520	$66,549	$77,474	118,811	43,216
3	Woodford	$28,501	$56,537	$67,094	24,939	9,806
4	Fayette	$28,345	$47,469	$66,690	295,803	123,043
5	Shelby	$27,593	$55,296	$68,647	42,074	15,321
	United States	$27,334	$51,914	$62,982	308,745,538	116,716,292
6	Kenton	$27,205	$53,213	$66,170	159,720	62,768
7	Campbell	$27,096	$51,482	$68,431	90,336	36,069
8	Franklin	$26,857	$47,976	$61,086	49,285	20,662
9	Scott	$26,838	$58,028	$68,219	47,173	17,408
10	Jefferson	$26,473	$45,352	$59,182	741,096	309,175
11	Spencer	$25,589	$59,326	$64,350	17,061	6,165
12	McCracken	$24,709	$41,630	$55,789	65,565	28,227
13	Anderson	$24,516	$55,506	$63,815	21,421	8,369
14	Jessamine	$24,097	$47,494	$55,625	48,586	17,642
15	Clark	$23,966	$46,575	$55,906	35,613	14,267
16	Mercer	$23,645	$47,955	$55,127	21,331	8,682
17	Trigg	$23,387	$41,825	$49,337	14,339	5,883
18	Warren	$23,206	$43,954	$57,523	113,792	43,674
19	Marshall	$23,056	$43,326	$53,403	31,448	13,073
20	Ballard	$23,001	$41,228	$48,246	8,249	3,397
21	Hardin	$22,997	$47,540	$56,354	105,543	39,853
22	Bullitt	$22,791	$51,526	$59,435	74,319	27,673
23	Boyle	$22,534	$40,720	$48,201	28,432	11,075
	Kentucky	$22,515	$41,576	$52,046	4,339,367	1,719,965
24	Henderson	$22,192	$40,438	$52,775	46,250	18,705
25	Boyd	$22,064	$38,802	$51,684	49,542	19,787
26	Daviess	$22,064	$42,821	$55,080	96,656	38,619
27	Carroll	$21,845	$43,440	$48,110	10,811	4,061
28	Nelson	$21,763	$44,783	$52,173	43,437	16,826
29	Owen	$21,754	$46,238	$56,794	10,841	4,296
30	Mason	$21,717	$40,523	$47,244	17,490	7,031
31	Madison	$21,536	$41,894	$55,095	82,916	31,973
32	Greenup	$21,533	$42,377	$51,538	36,910	14,671
33	Bourbon	$21,355	$40,849	$46,111	19,985	7,976
34	Hopkins	$21,347	$39,312	$49,313	46,920	18,980
35	Green	$21,281	$36,575	$47,582	11,258	4,601
36	Trimble	$21,161	$47,798	$52,308	8,809	3,420
37	Henry	$21,090	$43,612	$50,101	15,416	5,963
38	McLean	$21,071	$39,115	$46,401	9,531	3,833
39	Calloway	$20,951	$39,194	$54,074	37,191	15,530
40	Washington	$20,873	$43,090	$49,792	11,717	4,507
41	Livingston	$20,800	$39,075	$45,696	9,519	3,985
42	Simpson	$20,426	$41,323	$50,486	17,327	6,753
43	Grant	$20,257	$42,475	$45,688	24,662	8,614
44	Barren	$20,067	$38,374	$48,444	42,173	16,999
45	Harrison	$20,037	$40,582	$51,715	18,846	7,343
46	Montgomery	$20,004	$36,034	$46,563	26,499	10,435
47	Graves	$19,976	$35,277	$45,307	37,121	14,978
48	Hickman	$19,953	$31,836	$52,823	4,902	2,028
49	Hancock	$19,952	$44,892	$53,352	8,565	3,285
50	Laurel	$19,604	$36,787	$43,373	58,849	23,014
51	Pulaski	$19,540	$32,771	$42,117	63,063	25,722
52	Pendleton	$19,523	$44,670	$52,166	14,877	5,494
53	Caldwell	$19,498	$35,289	$48,257	12,984	5,393
54	Crittenden	$19,463	$34,623	$45,222	9,315	3,781
55	Logan	$19,443	$34,647	$47,141	26,835	10,666
56	Perry	$19,049	$29,547	$39,025	28,712	11,319
57	Lyon	$19,036	$42,079	$47,944	8,314	3,287
58	Pike	$18,973	$32,563	$40,332	65,024	26,728
59	Edmonson	$18,959	$35,808	$45,084	12,161	4,857
60	Webster	$18,879	$39,635	$49,580	13,621	5,272
61	Meade	$18,823	$43,800	$47,457	28,602	10,471
62	Union	$18,811	$39,515	$52,500	15,007	5,549
63	Garrard	$18,735	$37,095	$46,964	16,912	6,668
64	Bracken	$18,671	$38,481	$45,441	8,488	3,317
65	Muhlenberg	$18,538	$36,750	$43,006	31,499	12,052
66	Johnson	$18,486	$30,820	$39,631	23,356	9,362
67	Christian	$18,476	$37,061	$42,416	73,955	26,144
68	LaRue	$18,474	$38,891	$47,982	14,193	5,615
69	Nicholas	$18,452	$40,259	$43,410	7,135	2,809
70	Marion	$18,445	$37,488	$48,914	19,820	7,358
71	Ohio	$18,258	$36,050	$43,797	23,842	9,176
72	Carter	$18,147	$32,424	$40,316	27,720	10,760
73	Taylor	$18,014	$35,378	$44,064	24,512	9,832
74	Russell	$17,868	$29,980	$40,507	17,565	7,401
75	Gallatin	$17,810	$41,310	$47,953	8,589	3,160
76	Breckinridge	$17,757	$37,395	$43,847	20,059	7,827
77	Morgan	$17,705	$30,229	$39,052	13,923	4,860
78	Fleming	$17,629	$31,236	$47,798	14,348	5,729
79	Todd	$17,460	$36,989	$44,171	12,460	4,647
80	Grayson	$17,443	$33,965	$43,829	25,746	10,082
81	Rowan	$17,435	$31,604	$45,760	23,333	8,864
82	Letcher	$17,393	$31,283	$42,662	24,519	10,014
83	Carlisle	$17,260	$33,909	$42,071	5,104	2,116
84	Butler	$17,236	$33,703	$42,754	12,690	5,057
85	Lincoln	$16,985	$32,314	$41,101	24,742	9,777
86	Fulton	$16,908	$31,965	$35,713	6,813	2,864
87	Allen	$16,897	$35,247	$45,013	19,956	7,848
88	Metcalfe	$16,835	$34,732	$40,869	10,099	4,055
89	Hart	$16,726	$30,969	$40,717	18,199	7,097
90	Breathitt	$16,442	$19,906	$29,038	13,878	5,494
91	Knott	$16,110	$29,451	$35,537	16,346	6,414
92	Wayne	$16,109	$25,993	$31,305	20,813	8,646
93	Lawrence	$15,903	$28,865	$35,781	15,860	6,239
94	Floyd	$15,883	$27,907	$32,344	39,451	16,060
95	Powell	$15,796	$31,815	$38,776	12,613	4,834
96	Adair	$15,790	$29,834	$40,427	18,656	7,285
97	Estill	$15,725	$28,324	$36,232	14,672	5,984
98	Rockcastle	$15,621	$26,946	$37,509	17,056	6,750
99	Monroe	$15,534	$28,439	$37,335	10,963	4,509
100	Bath	$15,487	$30,458	$37,874	11,591	4,587
101	Menifee	$15,418	$29,740	$41,157	6,306	2,440
102	Robertson	$15,374	$27,254	$48,821	2,282	902
103	Whitley	$15,258	$28,122	$35,469	35,637	13,575
104	Harlan	$15,224	$26,582	$32,447	29,278	11,789
105	Cumberland	$15,025	$28,135	$33,470	6,856	2,883
106	Lewis	$14,915	$28,376	$35,146	13,870	5,497
107	Clinton	$14,802	$23,788	$28,187	10,272	4,358
108	Martin	$14,785	$25,173	$30,018	12,929	4,516
109	Leslie	$14,753	$26,857	$35,941	11,310	4,555
110	Bell	$14,627	$24,724	$32,060	28,691	11,787
111	Casey	$14,252	$26,592	$35,949	15,955	6,351
112	Knox	$14,101	$21,493	$30,724	31,883	12,722
113	Jackson	$13,935	$21,928	$28,349	13,494	5,486
114	Magoffin	$13,849	$22,779	$38,411	13,333	5,309
115	Elliott	$13,072	$22,097	$33,220	7,852	2,773
116	Lee	$12,983	$25,129	$32,862	7,887	2,910
117	Clay	$12,300	$20,175	$28,862	21,730	7,732
118	McCreary	$12,197	$22,643	$26,421	18,306	6,477
119	Wolfe	$11,214	$20,910	$22,489	7,355	3,065
120	Owsley	$10,767	$19,351	$22,961	4,755	5,555
