= Restaurant Row =

Restaurant Row may refer to a street or region known for having multiple restaurants.

Notable Restaurant Rows include:

- Restaurant Row (Beverly Hills), La Cienega Boulevard in Beverly Hills, north of Wilshire Boulevard
- Restaurant Row (New York City), West 46th Street in New York City between Eighth and Ninth Avenues

== See also ==
- List of restaurant districts and streets
