= Parkways of Louisville, Kentucky =

- Olmsted Park System
- U.S. National Register of Historic Places
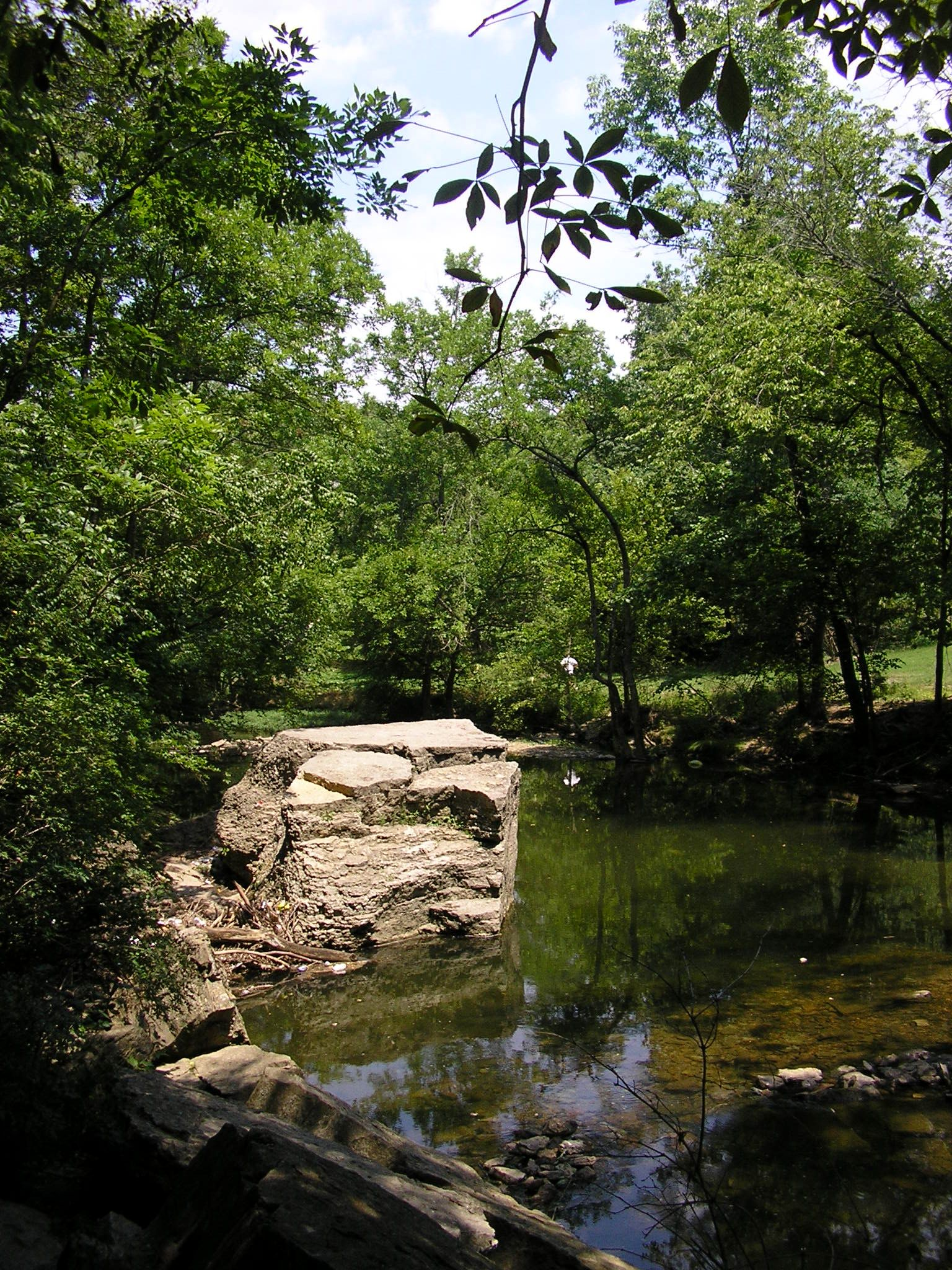
- Cherokee Park
- Location: Louisville, Kentucky
- Built: 1891
- Architect: Frederick Law Olmsted
- NRHP reference No.: 82002715
- Added to NRHP: May 17, 1982

The parkway system of Louisville, Kentucky, United States (also known as the Olmsted Park System) was designed by the firm of preeminent 19th century landscape architect Frederick Law Olmsted. The 26-mile (42 km) system was built from the early 1890s through the 1930s, and initially owned by a state-level parks commission, which passed control to the city of Louisville in 1942.

The system was intended to form a circuit around what was then the fringes of the city of Louisville. However, there is a disconnect of several blocks between Eastern and Southern Parkways, because of a planned parkway running from the terminus of Western (today's Northwestern) Parkway along the Ohio River and around to Eastern Parkway was never built.

Today, the system falls under direct management of the Louisville Olmsted Parks Conservancy, and under broader supervision by Louisville's Metro Parks Department

== Development ==
The system was first proposed in 1887 by businessman Andrew Cowan, an enthusiastic early supporter of Louisville's park system. He proposed a series of parkways that would cross every turnpike near the city as the parkways connected the three proposed parks at the eastern, western and southern fringes of the city. Although Cowan proposed a slow and deliberate development, Mayor Charles Donald Jacob purchased what became Iroquois Park a year later and quickly began acquiring through donations the land to build 150-foot (46 m)-wide "Grand Boulevard" (later renamed Southern Parkway) connecting that southern property to the city. Jacob claimed the boulevard would rival Champs-Élysées in Paris.

A parks commission was created in 1890, and soon hired Olmsted's firm to design the entire system. The firm delivered a report in September 1891 calling for three large parks and parkways connecting them.

The parkways were intended to carry light pleasure vehicles between the parks, with no access to heavier commercial vehicles. It was not until 1958 that the city opened up the parkways to all commercial and passenger traffic. As the city expanded and the parkways became heavily traveled roads, they have been widened beyond their original two lanes, in many cases sacrificing the grass medians and tree-lined yards that were originally a part of them. Still, as of 2000, 75% of the original trees remained or had been replaced by new trees. There were 5,107 trees along the parkways according to a 1994 count. Between 2008 and 2011, a major project was undertaken to restore many of the trees that had been damaged by storms, traffic, or age and disease. This has filled in many of the canopy gaps along the parkways, and was done as much as possible in accordance with the original Olmstedian plan. Today there are various proposals being debated to ease traffic issues and restore connectivity of the city's parks via these routes. One such plan involves bike lanes and center lanes for turning.

== Parkways ==
=== Algonquin Parkway ===
Algonquin Parkway connects the Western parkways to Southern and Eastern Parkways via Third Street, cutting east-to-west across the city. The last of the parkways to be finished, Algonquin was partially completed in 1928 by the Carey-Reed Company of Lexington at an initial cost of $120,000 with a width of just 20 feet (6.1 m) at the time, although space was reserved for widening once the area became more developed. When it opened it ran from Winkler Avenue to the Kentucky State Fairgrounds. The widening was finished in the late 1930s by workers for the Works Progress Administration.

Algonquin has been cited as the "most extreme" example of a parkway that has deviated from the original plan, due to a junkyard that is located alongside it.

=== Eastern Parkway ===
Eastern Parkway begins at an intersection with Third Street in the Belknap (main) campus of the University of Louisville. This portion ends a few blocks from Southern Parkway, and is a key gap between the parkways that has never been filled in. The portion through the University of Louisville campus was initially just two lanes, creating a major traffic bottleneck. This portion was replaced with a viaduct which passes over the campus, completed in October 1954 at a cost of $850,000. The viaduct was opened with a ribbon-cutting ceremony attended by mayor Broaddus, who then got into his car to become the first to drive over it. However, two vehicles competing to be the second collided, creating a wreck within seconds of the road's opening. Today, the parkway has one vehicular lane in each direction, plus painted bicycle gutters, through campus, widening to four lanes immediately east of the viaduct.

East of the university, there is an interchange with Interstate 65, and past that the parkway takes on a more residential feel for the rest of the route, with houses and apartment buildings on either side, except for near major intersections. The parkway passes over a concrete channel Beargrass Creek on an overpass built in 1961.

From Barrett to Baxter Avenue, the parkway is divided by a grassy median with mature trees. The final stretch of the parkway, past Bardstown Road, is the only two-lane portion outside of the U of L campus, although it is very wide, to allow for on-street parking. Eastern Parkway ends in a roundabout at the entrance to Cherokee Park, at the center of which is a 1906 statue of Daniel Boone made by Enid Yandell. Eastern Parkway is signed as US 60 from Third Street to Willow Avenue, nearly the entire length of the parkway.

The right-of-way for Eastern Parkway is 100 feet (30 m) wide, and initial development of it was completed in late 1913. A long portion of the route was donated by John Breckinridge Castleman, accounting for the sharp jog at the Baxter Avenue intersection. Parkway Field took its name from and was located beside Eastern Parkway from 1926 until 2002.

The entire length of Eastern Parkway is signed as Alternate US 60, as US 60 followed the Parkway through the city before a bypass, I-264, was created. Eastern Parkway has an interchange with Interstate 65.

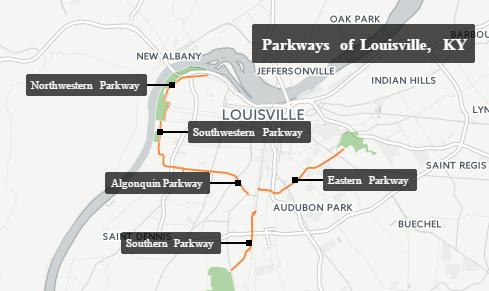
Parkways Of Louisville

Although Eastern Parkway was intended as a recreational road, it is the only direct connector between the populous Highlands and Germantown sections of Louisville and mid-city destinations like the University of Louisville's main campus. As such, it has had problems associated with a road carrying much more traffic than it was designed for since at least the 1950s, when the intersection with Third Street consistently led the state of Kentucky in number of crashes per year at a single intersection. Various proposals have been made to improve safety on the road, including reducing it to three vehicle lanes and two bike lanes. Narrowing proposals were last made in 2006, although the plan was rejected since the traffic volume at the time, 21,000 vehicles per day, was too much for three lanes.

=== Northwestern/Southwestern Parkway ===
Northwestern and Southwestern Parkways were initially called just Western Parkway. A large amount of the right-of-way was donated by Democratic Party boss John Henry Whallen, who made his residence near what is now Chickasaw Park.

=== Southern Parkway ===
First called Grand Boulevard, Southern Parkway runs from near Churchill Downs to the entrance to Iroquois Park. It begins at third street, near the Eastern Parkway intersection, and the two parkways can easily be combined to connect Iroquois to Cherokee Park.

It was renamed Southern Parkway on June 6, 1893, and opened to the public eight days later.
