= Bardstown Road =

Major road in Louisville, Kentucky, USA

- Length: 55 mi (89 km)
- South end: US 31E / US 62 / US 150 in Bardstown
- Major junctions: I-265 in Louisville; I-264 in Louisville US 60 Alt. in Louisville
- North end: US 31E / US 150 in Louisville

Bardstown Road is a major road in Louisville, Kentucky. It carries U.S. Route 31E and U.S. Route 150, from the intersection of Baxter Avenue (US 31E) and Broadway (US 150), southeast through Jefferson and Bullitt counties, becoming Louisville Road through Spencer and Nelson counties. It has been referred to as a "restaurant row" and also considered one of Kentucky's most dangerous roads.

== Description ==
Bardstown Road carries U.S. Route 31E and U.S. Route 150, from the intersection of Baxter Avenue (US 31E) and Broadway (US 150), southeast through Jefferson and Bullitt counties. In Spencer and Nelson counties, the road is named Louisville Road, which becomes 3rd Street in Bardstown, where US 31E and US 150 split at the intersection with U.S. Route 62 (Stephen Foster Avenue).

It has been called Louisville's original "Restaurant Row" due to its many restaurants, bakeries, and cafes.

As of June 2018, a segment of Bardstown Road in the Highlands (Note: A span from Douglass Boulevard to Bardstown Road's northern terminus at Baxter Avenue, along with several blocks of Baxter Avenue north of the terminus) has four lanes, with the outer two lanes used for on-street parking during non-peak traffic hours. Parking is banned during morning and evening commuting hours, during which all four lanes become traffic lanes with movements controlled by lane lights. Two lanes are dedicated to traffic in the normal commuting direction (northbound in the morning and southbound in the evening); the lane to the left of commuting traffic becomes a dedicated left-turn lane; and the final lane accommodates traffic traveling opposite to the commuting direction.

== Safety ==
Metro Councilman Brandon Coan (D-8) states that "Bardstown Road is one of the most dangerous roads in the state of Kentucky in terms of the number of crashes".

=== 2017 traffic studies and modifications ===
In 2017, the merged government of Louisville and Jefferson County commissioned a study to suggest possible changes to traffic patterns through The Highlands, with the study being released in mid-2018. The study recommended that the permanent traffic pattern should be one lane in each direction at all times, with permanent on-street parking throughout except at the approaches to signalized intersections, which would now include permanent left-turn lanes. Recommendations were also made for two more southerly sections of the road between Douglass Boulevard and the Watterson Expressway, which currently have two traffic lanes in each direction. The study also presents the idea that infrastructure for pedestrians is lacking and more crosswalks are needed. Between Douglass Boulevard and Taylorsville Road, on-street parking would be eliminated, and a center two-way left-turn lane would be added. Such a turn lane would also be added between Tyler Lane and Brighton Drive (roughly from Assumption High School to Sullivan University), an area without on-street parking. The final plan is set to be announced in August 2018, though because of the road's designation as a U.S. highway, state approval is required before any work can start.

This study had now been completed and finalized modifications have been made public. These changes include, "one-lane in either direction with 24-hour parking on both sides, left turn lanes at intersections and updated stops for TARC buses". The KY transportation cabinet states that these changes will "increase pedestrian safety, decrease travel speeds and provide much needed parking in the area to support local businesses along the corridor". Metro Councilman Brandon Coan (D-8) told WAVE 3 the changes to Bardstown Road stem from a 2018 street safety study.

== See also ==
- Roads in Louisville, Kentucky
- The Highlands, Louisville
