= Hogan's Fountain Pavilion =

Gazebo and picnic shelter in Louisville, Kentucky, United States

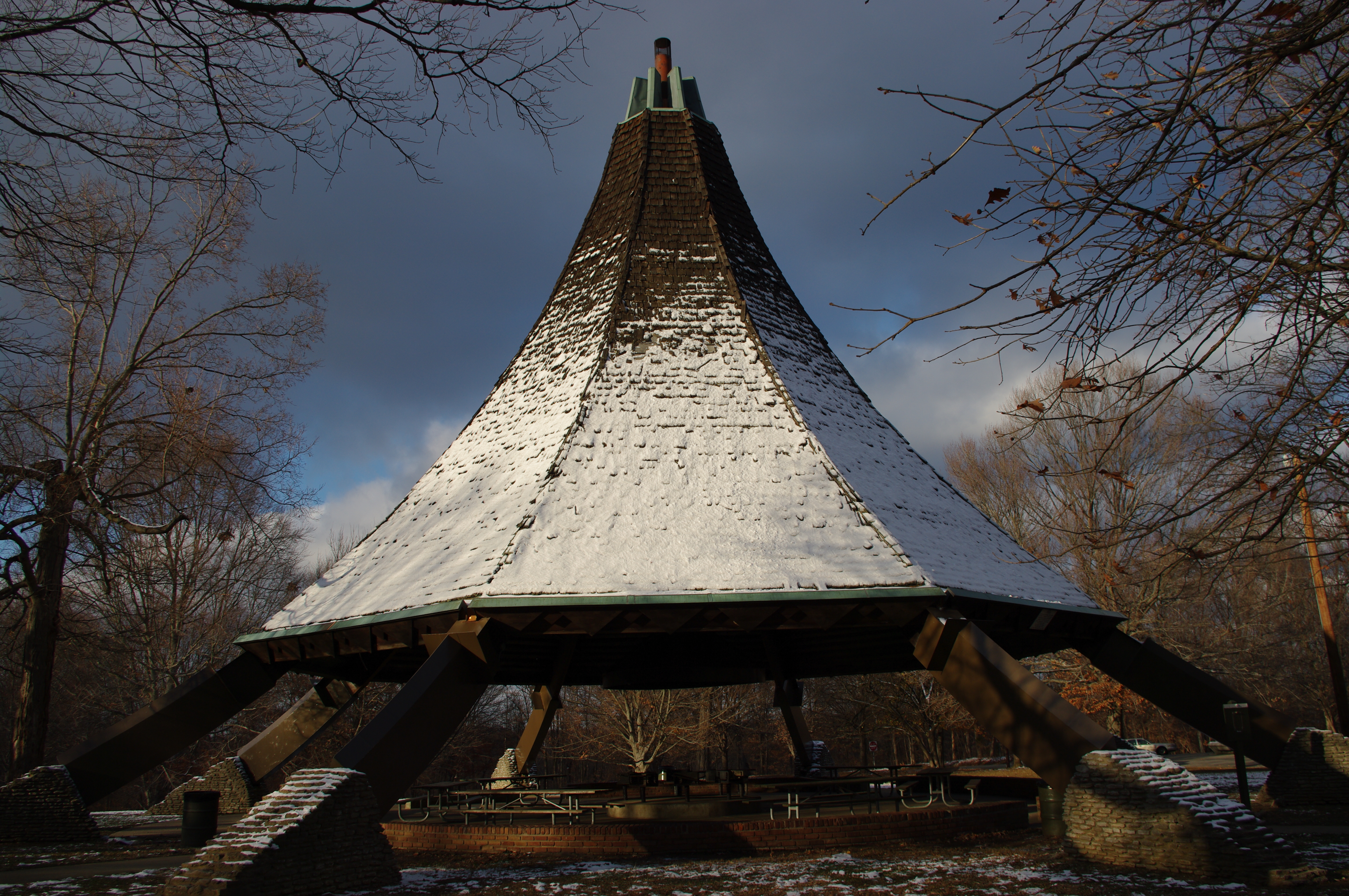
- Snow-covered pavilion, December 2010
- Interactive map of the Hogan's Fountain Pavilion area
- Alternative names: Teepee, Witch's Hat

General information
- Architectural style: Mid-century modern
- Location: in Cherokee Park, 3110 Scenic Loop, Louisville, Kentucky, 40205, U.S.
- Coordinates: 38°14′20″N 85°41′48″W
- Construction started: 1965
- Inaugurated: October 1965
- Demolished: July 2023
- Cost: $49,915
- Owner: Metro Louisville Government
- Landlord: Metro Parks

Height
- Height: 56 feet (17 m)

Technical details
- Floor area: 96 feet wide

Design and construction
- Architects: E.J. Schickli, Jr.
- Architecture firm: Tafel-Schickli Architects
- Main contractor: C.G. Campbell & Son, Inc.
- Awards: Louisville's Best Local Landmark in 2011 and 2012
- Designations: 2011–2012 Most Endangered Historic Places in Kentucky, 2012 A Historic Landmark

Other information
- Seating capacity: 200
- Parking: Adjacent

Website
- savetheteepee.com

The Hogan's Fountain Pavilion was a large gazebo and picnic shelter of mid-century modern architecture built in 1965 and located in Cherokee Park, Louisville, Kentucky, United States. It was a prominent landmark in Cherokee Park until it was demolished in 2023.

The pavilion was available to rent for a variety of events. When not rented, the pavilion was freely accessible to all park visitors. It was the most popular site within the park, renting for $150 per day, and raised more than $18,000 a year. It was located atop Bonnycastle Hill and acted as an architectural centerpiece along the park's 2.4-mile (3.9 km) scenic loop.

The pavilion itself had a 200-seat capacity, with eight grills and picnic tables. The area surrounding the pavilion features a playground, a spray ground, a basketball court, horseshoe pits, an area for volleyball, and a softball field. Hiking and biking trails are also located near the pavilion.

== Structure and development ==
Erecting the pavilion's first structural beams.

=== Architect ===
The Hogan's Fountain Pavilion was originally designed by Edward Jacob (E.J.) Schickli Jr., of Tafel–Schickli Architects in 1964. Schickli felt that a conical "wigwam" or "teepee" shaped design was appropriate as it reflected Cherokee Park's Native American-derived name.

Born in January 1928, Schickli graduated from MIT in 1950, became a registered architect in 1954, and became President of the West Kentucky Chapter of the American Institute of Architects (AIA) in 1961. Other prominent civic contributions by Schickli included the design of the original Louisville Zoo and Botanical Gardens in 1969 and Louisville's Standiford Field Airport expansion project in 1970, currently called the Louisville Muhammad Ali International Airport.

=== Design ===
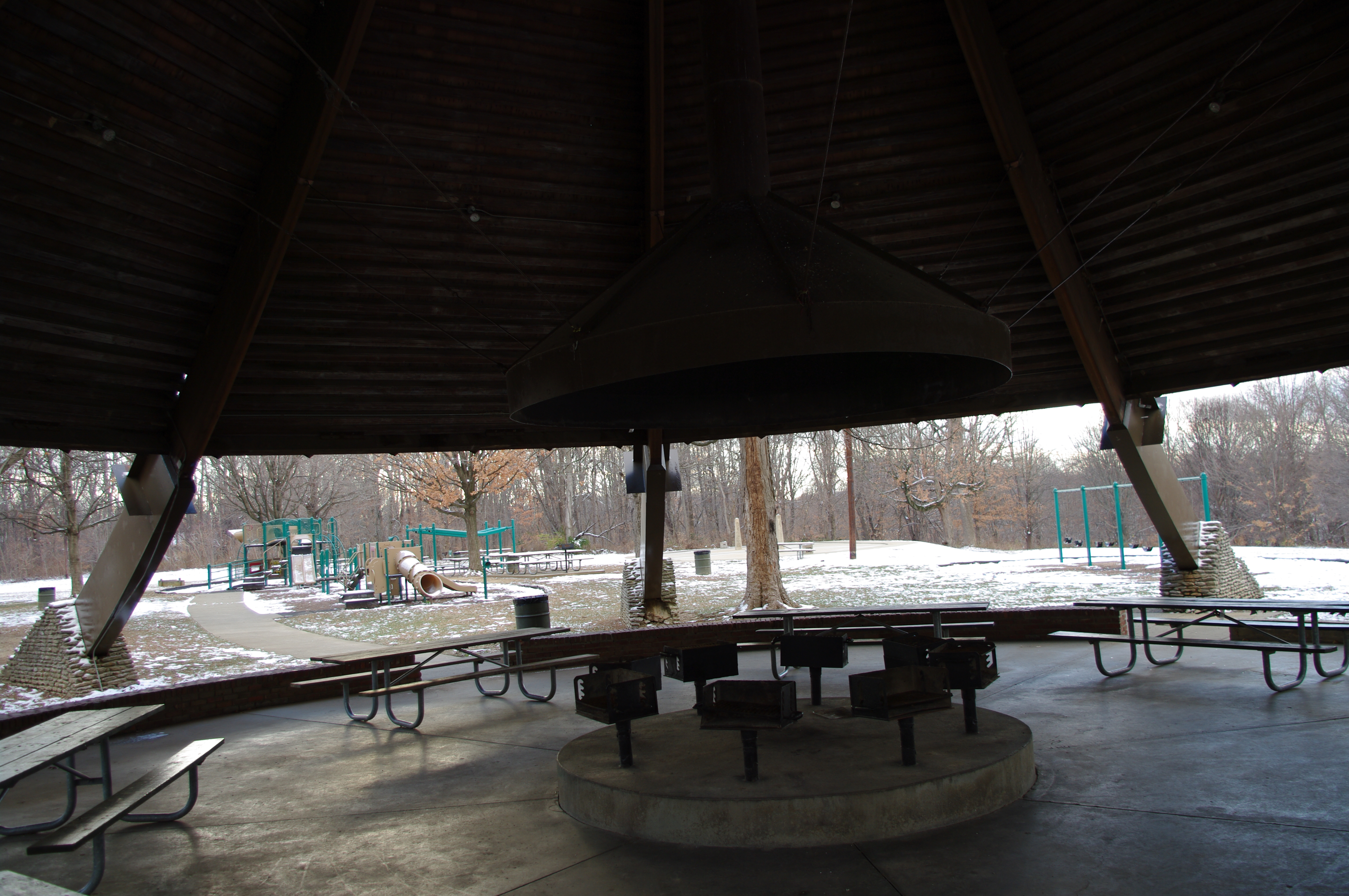
Configuration with ring of grills and tables

The pavilion had an atypical, octagonal-shaped roof. Designed to be rustic in appearance, the pavilion was intended to have a wood shake shingle roof. However, per a notation by M. Newton on February 5, 1965, into the original blueprint, he approved the shingle change from shake to that of cement shingles laid over a single layer of 15 lb. asphalt felt. The shape of the shelter garnered a great deal of media and public attention. "It will be a departure from the usual rectangular-shaped shelters built in parks in the past." Al Blunk, photographer for the Louisville Times, captured an early construction shot of the raising of the oversized laminated wood beams. The Louisville Times reported, "Beams curve skyward, hinting at the shape of things to come."

The floor of the pavilion was constructed of a round concrete pad, originally with a large interior circular fire pit surrounded by wooden picnic tables. Above the fire pit was a 13-foot (4.0 m) diameter smokestack which provided proper venting. The sides of the building were left open to help facilitate cooling by transferring the warm air upward through an opening at the top. Exiting the top of the covered roof, copper was clad to the exposed structural beams to cap them from the elements. The addition of copper gutter beds and scuppers highlighted the unconventional structure.

The laminated wood beams were anchored in eight concrete buttresses sheathed with native stone from the area. Lastly, a rectangular brick façade building was attached to the west side of the pavilion that housed the restrooms.

The finished teepee structure measured 56 ft (17 m) wide by 56 ft in height.

== History ==
Commissioned by the City Director of the Department of Parks and Recreation, George F. Kinkead in 1964, the originally named Hogan's Fountain Pavilion and Comfort Station, which was subsequently shortened to Hogan's Fountain Pavilion project was put out for bids. Out of 15 offers, the bid from C.G. Campbell & Son, Inc. was chosen and they were awarded a contract of $49,915 with a projected "ready for use" time of early May 1965.

According to Cynthia Johnson in a 2012 Local Landmark Designation Report for the Metro Historic Landmarks and Preservation Districts Commission, "the facility was originally named the McCall Shelter in honor of Alderman C.W. 'Ches' McCall who was killed in an auto accident in 1962. ... Although the structure was officially named for McCall, the local vernacular continues to refer to the shelter as the 'Teepee'."

In October 1965, Mayor William Cowger dedicated the pavilion.

=== 1973 tornado damage and repairs ===
On April 3, 1974, Louisville experienced an unprecedented number of tornadoes, dubbed "The Super Outbreak". The National Oceanic and Atmospheric Administration reported "massive devastation, 335 dead . . . more than 6,000 injured" in the storms. Approximately 2,200 or (75%) of the park's mature tree population was destroyed by the tornado. However, the pavilion survived aside from some missing shingles.

After the tornado an ad was placed in the Louisville Times on September 30, 1974, requesting bids on repairing the pavilion's roof. Six bids were entertained with the highest being $8,975 and the lowest from Kentucky Lumber Co. who was awarded the contract for $2,110 labor. The materials for the roof consisted of 15 squares of 18" x 1/2" hand split cedar shake shingles and 160 linear feet of hip shingles at a cost of $652. Work on the roof began on September 18, 1975.

In an effort to repair the damaged roof at a cost-saving, Parks Department officials elected to place the wood shake over the existing cement shingles.

Engineers Rangaswamy, Hatfield and Associates were paid $2,000 on October 6, 1978, for detailing needed structural repairs to damaged support beams. An ad was placed in the Louisville Times on December 4, 1978, requesting bids. In 1979, structural beams #6 and #7 were encased in steel to strengthen the pavilion's supports for $12,000.

Engineers Rangaswamy, Yost and Associates were contracted by the Parks Department for what was dubbed Phase II of needed pavilion repairs. On June 30, 1983, some painting was done and repairs were made to the smoke hood and flue. The creek stone on the abutments was also tended to for the amount of $850. On July 15, 1983, work began to encase the water damaged beams #1, #3, #5 and #8 in steel at a cost of $16,000.

The March 2, 1989 repair drawings explained the process of inserting two rows of ¾" solid rods 12" deep thru the existing beams, plug welding and then grinding smooth, whereas the commencement of encasing beams #2 and #4 with ¼" steel began. Additionally a 90˚ bent ¼" steel plate was welded onto all eight beams to prevent children from climbing onto the roof.

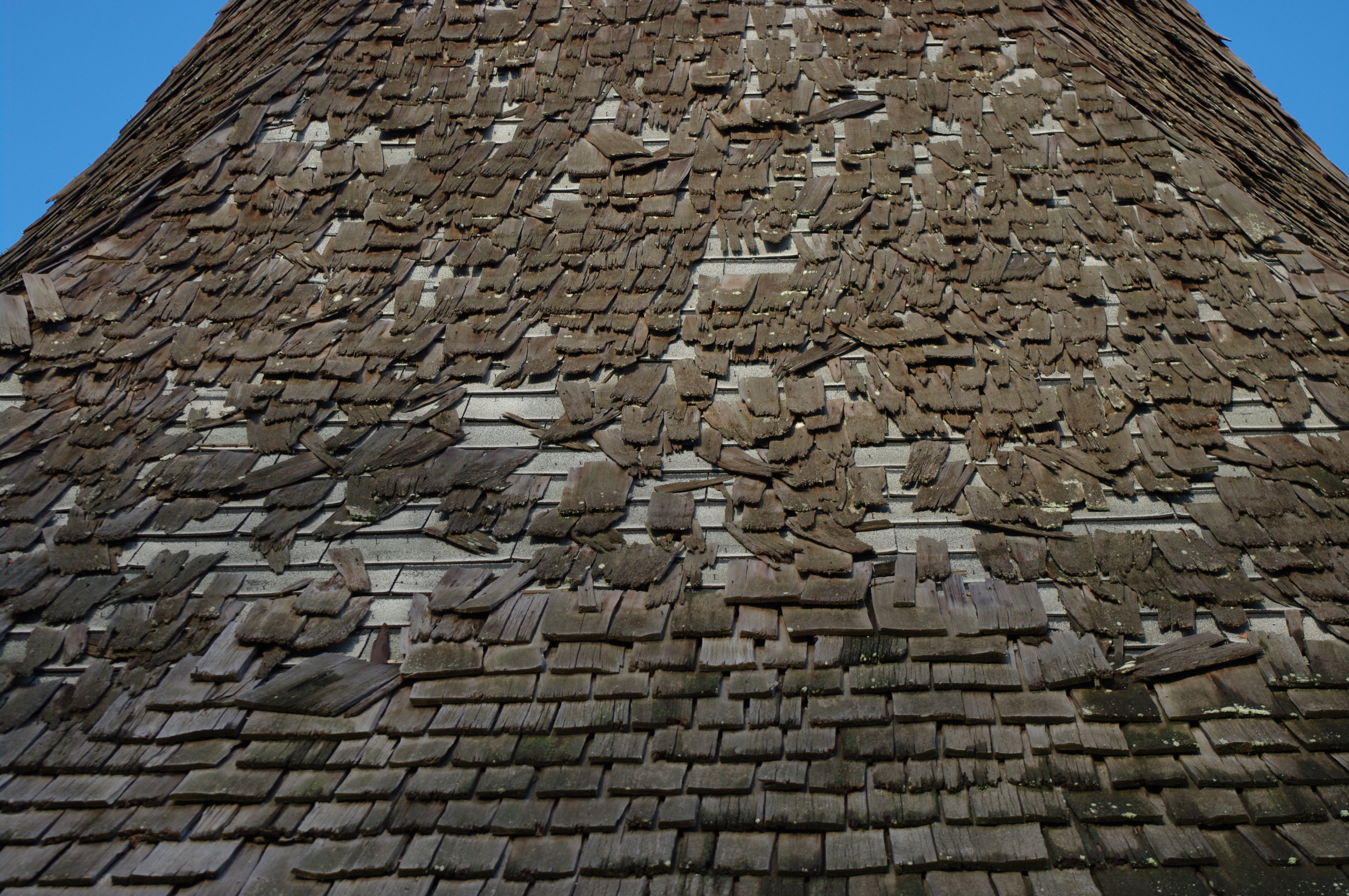
Weather damage to pavilion roof in December 2010

=== Fall into disrepair after 1994 ===
In 1994, the Parks Department and the Olmsted Parks Conservancy stated they would be "removing the tepee when its natural life span ends" as part of a Master Plan to recapture the original 1892 design that Frederick Law Olmsted envisioned for Cherokee Park.

After 1994, upkeep of the pavilion became nearly nonexistent. There had not been any maintenance concerning the wood shingles since 1989 and as a consequence the roof degraded to a very poor condition allowing substantial moisture infiltration by the elements. Additionally, the stone surrounding the buttresses became loosened and was separating from the concrete beneath it. Through an open records request, it was determined that from April 2007 to August 2010, the only repairs performed on the pavilion were to two barbecue grills.

=== 2010 plans for removal ===
In May 2010, the Louisville Metro Parks Department and the Olmsted Parks Conservancy announced a second Master Plan for the Hogan's Fountain area, including the replacement of the Hogan's Fountain Pavilion. The plan would replace the pavilion with two smaller box-like structures.

As with the earlier 1994 Master Plan, the Olmsted Parks Conservancy's primary stated goal was to preserve Olmsted's 1892 vision of the park. The Olmsted Parks philosophy of "restore, enhance and preserve" had gradually implemented removal of elements that were inconsistent with the Olmsted design intent."Frederick Law Olmsted Sr. "advised the Board of Park Commissioners to resist public demands for golf courses, tennis courts, ball fields, and other forms of active recreation in the large parks." The pavilion was not original to the park and did not seem to match the style of the rest of the park. Officials also claimed the cost of repairing the pavilion would be higher than the cost to replace the pavilion. Environmental concerns were also raised, with the frequent use of the structure potentially causing "erosion, soil compaction and damage to nearby historic trees".

In March 2010, Louisville resident Lark Phillips led a number of citizens interested in preserving and restoring the Hogan's Fountain Pavilion to form the Save Hogan's Fountain Pavilion group in hopes of saving the architectural structure from demolition under the second Master Plan for the park.

Meetings between the preservation group and Metro Parks Department Director, Mike Heitz, resulted in the temporary delay of any removal or replacement of the pavilion, on the condition that private funds were raised to repair the iconic structure. The Olmsted Parks Conservancy had solicited one bid in August 2009 to repair the pavilion roof, in the amount of $148,500 from Merrick-Kemper of Louisville. The preservation group sought out additional bids for the work. Integral Structures of Louisville reviewed the condition of the roof and agreed to donate a substantial portion of the labor and forego any mark-up on materials for a repair cost of $82,000. In November 2011, Commonwealth Roofing gave an estimate of $35,895 to repair the pavilions roof which reflected a donation of the overhead and profit, as well as a portion of the labor.

After two years of fundraising the preservation supporters had raised the necessary funds to repair the pavilion's roof and approached the Parks Department for a logistics meeting. However, shingles on the pavilion's roof had recently tested positive for asbestos and were non-friable. The Metro Parks Department mandated that a professional asbestos abatement firm remove the shingles. They received a quote from National Environmental Contracting (NEC) on April 9, 2012, in the amount of $28,129, thus raising the price tag to restore the pavilion. As of August 2012, the Save Hogan's Fountain Pavilion group had raised over $45,000 towards its goal to repair the roof of the pavilion.

==== Alternate plans ====
In October 2009, prior to the finalization of the Hogan Fountain Area Master Plan in December 2010, there were two alternate concepts proposed for this location. The first concept included the renovation of the existing pavilion and plans to build a second, smaller shelter to the south side of the Hogan's Fountain area. The larger shelter could be reserved for larger functions, with the smaller one available simultaneously for family picnics or smaller events. The second concept showed the removal of the existing pavilion and its replacement, along with the plans for the additional smaller shelter to the south side of the Hogan's Fountain area. In October 2009, Concept #1 of the Master Plan solved most concerns the Metro Parks had for the Hogan's Fountain area, but this option was eliminated in the 2010 final Master Plan. Renderings of this failed option can be seen on the Louisville Metro Parks website.

==== Opponents ====
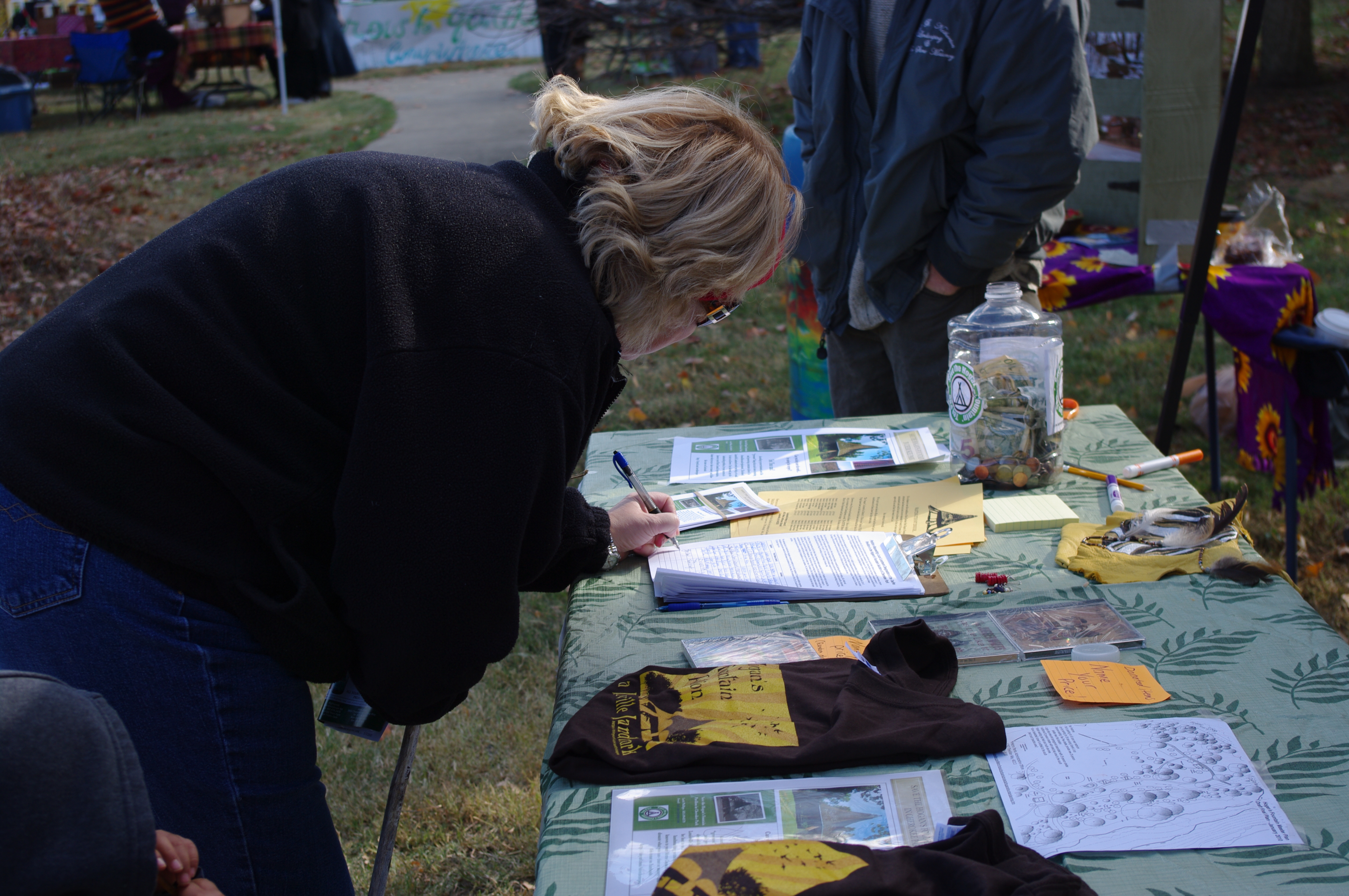
Raising awareness and gathering local support.

Many local citizens were unhappy with the plan for the pavilion's removal. Opponents of the plan included Richard Guy Wilson, Rachel Worley, 2011 President of the AIA Central Kentucky Chapter, Rachel Kennedy, executive director of Preservation Kentucky, and Devin Colman, President of the Recent Past Preservation Network, who also claimed the Parks Department proposition was directly in violation of the U.S. Secretary of the Interior's Standards for Rehabilitation, specifically standards 3 and 4. The Kentucky Heritage Council, Louisville Historical League, Preservation Kentucky, and the Southern Regional Office of the National Trust for Historic Preservation also opposed the plan.

Dr. Daniel Vivian, Assistant Professor and Director of the Public History Program at the University of Louisville stated that "...the pavilion is a locally important example of midcentury recreational architecture. Its design represents an innovative, highly distinctive union of modernist influences and traditional modes of park architecture."

In June 2010, Architect E.J. Schickli expressed disappointment about the plans for the pavilion's removal. "That's the problem with most public and semi-public entities," Schickli said, "Money is often appropriated to build them but never to provide maintenance for them. It doesn't matter if it's this or any other structure. It's a mind-set I will never understand." When asked by the Courier-Journal about his teepee project, Schickli said he would like to see his project preserved. "It's a whimsical structure; the type of thing I believe belongs in parks." At one event in 2012, when asked how long he thought the structure would stand, he answered "Well, my body at almost 85 years of age, it's stood a long time, but I've had maintenance; and if I had so little maintenance as that structure I would have been gone long ago."

===== Fundraising =====
Fundraising to save the pavilion began with a concert put on by the preservation group in August 2010 after receipt of Integral Structures' $82,000 roof repair bid. The Save Hogan's Fountain Pavilion group and Adam Matthews Foundation, a non-profit (501c3) organization, partnered as a fundraising vehicle to begin the restoration process. The Adam Matthews Foundation also matched donations in the amount of $1500 towards the preservation efforts.

Hogan's Fountain Pavilion supporters participated in the 2010 online competition "We Hear You America", sponsored by Reader's Digest magazine. In Louisville, repairing the Hogan's Fountain Pavilion was the overwhelming favorite of the voters. They were awarded a $1,000 prize for being one of the Best 100 Cities in America (based on participation in the contest). They were awarded a second prize of $10,000 for being a runner up in a winning city with a population of 500,000 or more residents. This award triggered a $5,000 challenge grant from Louisville Metro Councilwoman, Tina Ward-Pugh, D-9th District. Ward-Pugh was the first politician to make a pledge towards the restoration of the pavilion, and followed up her initial $5,000 challenge grant with a subsequent $5,000 matching grant.

Volunteers of the grassroots group staffed booths at local festivals to raise awareness of the pavilion's status and to collect donations. The group sold t-shirts to help raise funds and undertook a small letter writing campaign to notify organizations who had patronized the pavilion that they were working to save it and asking for donations and or support. One such letter produced a $1,000 donation from YUM Brands.

Support was also offered by local businesses and neighborhood associations, including the Belknap Neighborhood Association in April 2011, the Bonnycastle Homestead Association in June 2011, the Highland Douglass Neighborhood Association (HDNA) in June 2011 and August 2012, and the Deer Park Neighborhood Association. O'Shea's Pub and Flanagan's Ale House also held fundraising events, and in June 2011 they presented a check totaling $2,500 to the grassroots group.

Local bands and concerts also raised funds for the pavilion's preservation. The band "Hogan's Fountain" donated 50% of profits (during February and March 2011) for iTunes sales of their song "Shine Your Light on Me (Remix)". The Louisville Hippie's Reunion/Benefit Hogans Fountain TeePee was held by several bands on August 5, 2012, at Stevie Ray's Blues Bar in downtown Louisville, raising $1,700.

The sons of Mr. Schickli, the pavilion's architect, donated $5,000 in honor of their father and allocated an additional $5,000 to a dollar-for-dollar matching grant beginning in September 2011. Upon completion they donated an additional $500.

Tom Owen, Louisville Metro Councilman, D-8th District, made a pledge to fund the last $3,800 of the cost to re-roof the Pavilion and later made an additional pledge of $1,000.

== Landmark status ==
In January 2011, Richard Guy Wilson recommended that the National Trust for Historic Preservation include the Hogan's Fountain Pavilion as one of "America's 11 Most Endangered Historic Places"

Save Hogan's Fountain Pavilion submitted an application in early August 2011 to have the pavilion added to the Historic Landmarks and Preservation Districts Commission.

In September 2011 during the annual LEO Reader's Choice Awards, The Hogan's Fountain Pavilion garnered number one in Best Local Landmark and Save Hogan's Fountain Pavilion ranked number two in the Best Nonprofit category.

On October 14, 2011, Preservation Kentucky announced that the Hogan's Fountain Pavilion had been placed on its 2011 – 2012 Most Endangered Historic Places in Kentucky List.

A Historic Landmarks Designation Hearing for the pavilion was held on September 24, 2012. Included in the proceedings was a 29-page Landmark Designation Report drafted and submitted by Cynthia Johnson, Preservation Officer of the Historic Landmarks and Preservation Districts Commission. After four and a half hours of testimony the hearing concluded with Hogan's Fountain Pavilion being designated with official individual Local Landmark status.

In September 2012, the Hogan's Fountain Pavilion was voted among the top Louisville Landmarks in the LEO Reader's Choice Awards.

On May 11, 2022, the Hogan's Fountain Pavilion permanently closed. The pavilion was surrounded by fences until an emergency demolition on the pavilion was ordered by the city on July 21, 2023, due to structural issues. The structure was demolished on July 26, 2023.

== See also ==
- List of attractions and events in the Louisville metropolitan area
- List of parks in the Louisville metropolitan area
