= Vincennes Trace =

Trackway

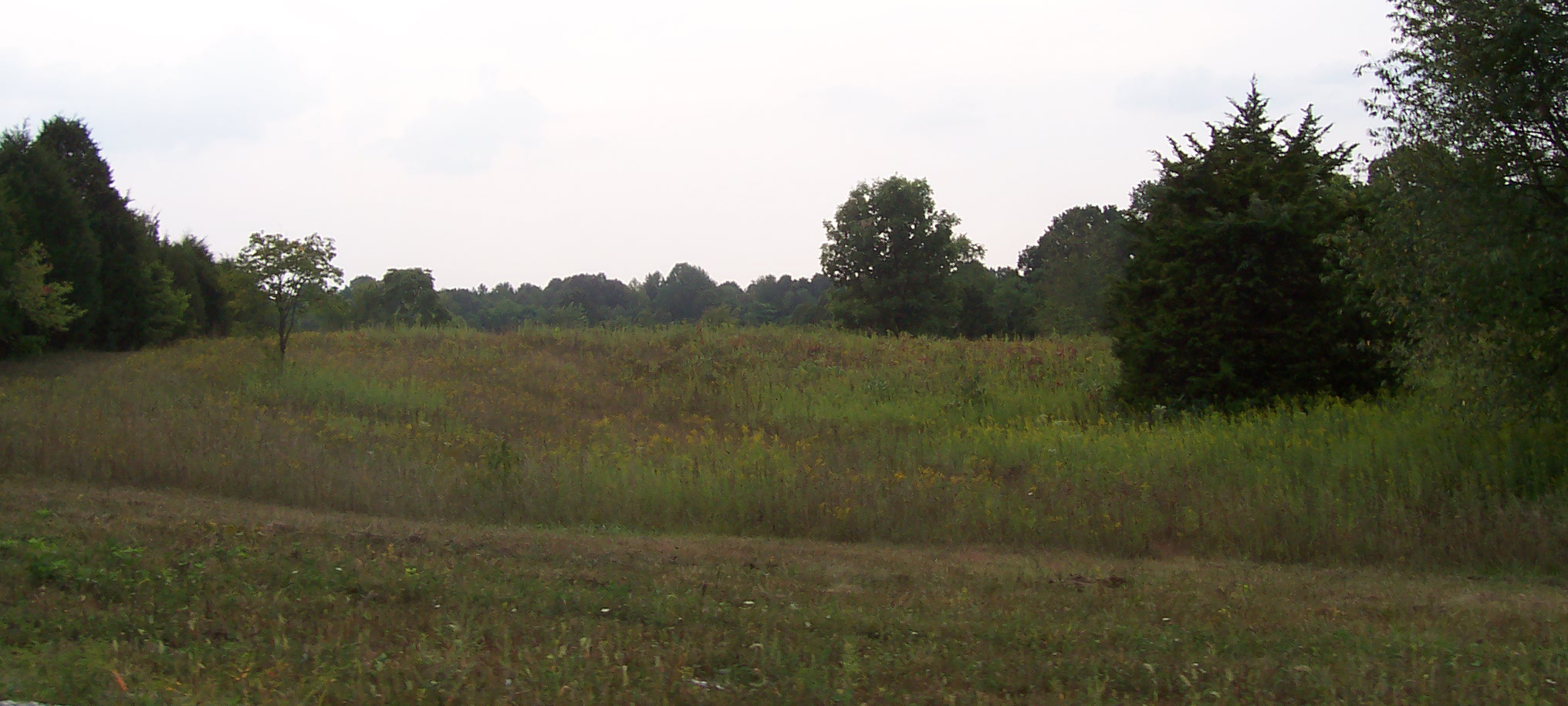
Buffalo Trace near Palmyra, Indiana overgrown and barely distinguishable

The Vincennes Trace was a major trackway running through what are now the American states of Kentucky, Indiana, and Illinois. Originally formed by millions of migrating bison, the Trace crossed the Ohio River near the Falls of the Ohio and continued northwest to the Wabash River, near present-day Vincennes, before it crossed to what became known as Illinois. This buffalo migration route, often 12 to 20 feet wide in places, was well known and used by American Indians. Later European traders and American settlers learned of it, and many used it as an early land route to travel west into Indiana and Illinois. It is considered the most important of the traces to the Illinois country.

It was known by various names, including Buffalo Trace, Louisville Trace, Clarksville Trace, and Old Indian Road. After being improved as a turnpike, the New Albany-Paoli Pike, among others. The Trace's continuous use encouraged improvements over the years, including paving and roadside development. U.S. Route 150 between Vincennes, Indiana, and Louisville, Kentucky, follows a portion of this path. Sections of the improved Trace have been designated as part of a National Scenic Byway that crosses southern Indiana.

== History ==
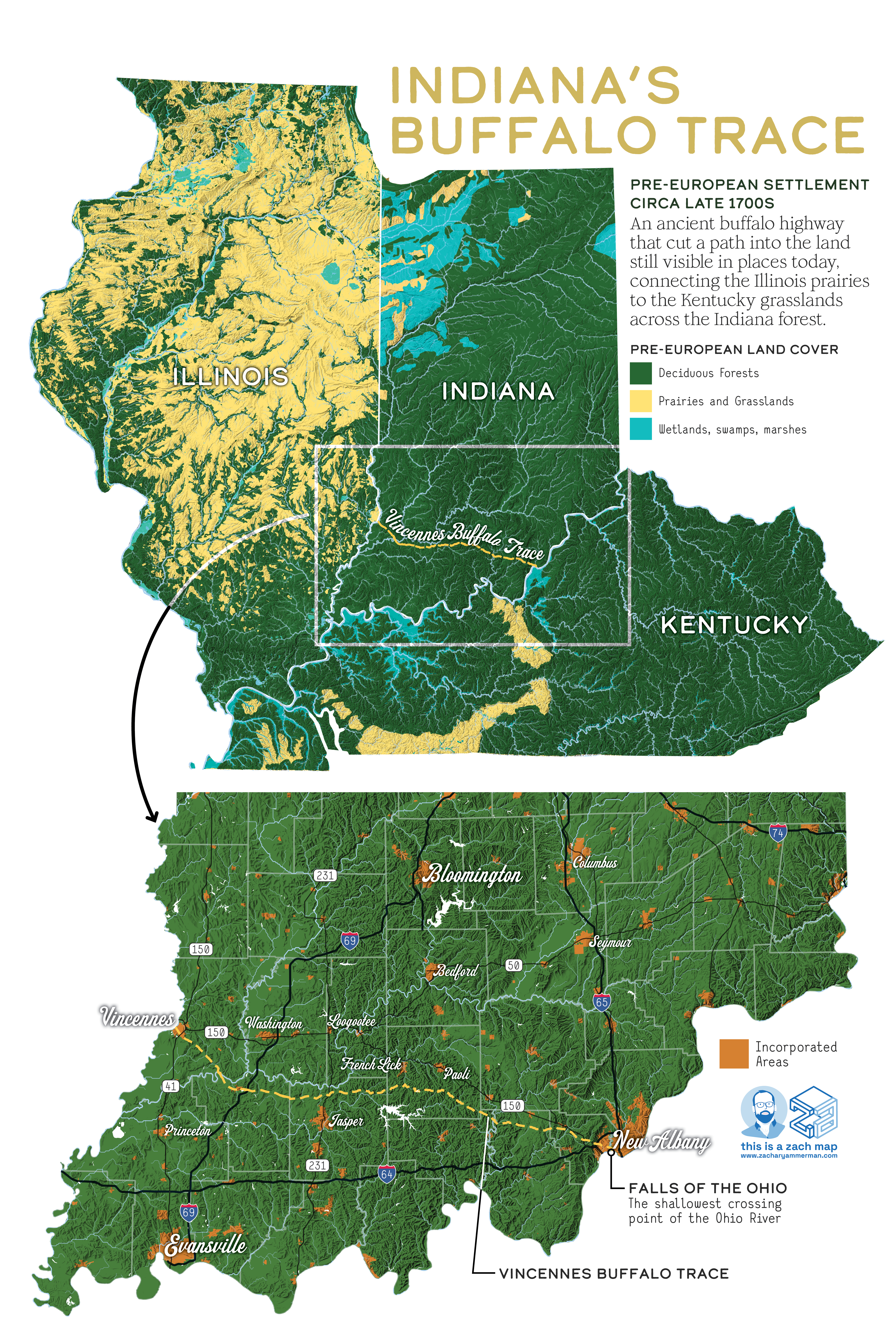
The route of the Vincennes Buffalo Trace in southern Indiana, which provided a route for buffalo to cross from the Illinois prairies to the Kentucky grasslands via the woods of southern Indiana, crossing the Ohio at the Falls of the Ohio.

The Trace was created by millions of migrating bison that were numerous in the region from the Great Lakes to the Piedmont of North Carolina. It was part of a greater buffalo migration route that extended from present-day Big Bone Lick State Park in Kentucky, through Bullitt's Lick, south of present-day Louisville, and across the Falls of the Ohio River to Indiana, then northwest to Vincennes, before crossing the Wabash River into Illinois. The trail was well known among the area's natives and used for centuries. It later became known and used by European traders and white settlers who crossed the Ohio River at the Falls and followed the Trace overland to the western territories. It is considered to be the most important of the early traces leading to the Illinois country.

In Indiana the Trace's main line split into several smaller trails that converged north of Jasper, near several large ponds, or mud holes, where buffalo would wallow. Due to the large number of buffalo that used the Trace, the well-worn path was twelve to twenty feet wide in places. Various trails also converged around a major salt lick, probably near present-day French Lick, Indiana. The Trace crossed the White River at several points, including places near the present-day towns of Petersburg and Portersville, Indiana. After a major crossing at the Wabash River, the Trace split into separate trails that led west across Illinois to the Mississippi River or north to what would become Chicago. In Chicago, the Trace is called Vincennes Avenue, and after state-funded improvements and straightening, parts became State Street.

The Trace across southern Indiana became integral to early development. Two main areas of early settlement in the Indiana Territory were made along it: Vincennes to the west and Clark's Grant in the south. In the early 18th century, the French developed colonial posts in the Illinois Country by moving down the Mississippi and into its tributaries. In 1732 François-Marie Bissot, Sieur de Vincennes, founded a trading post near the Trace's Wabash River crossing; it developed as the town of Vincennes. After the American Revolutionary War, in the late 1780s the U.S. government granted land in New York, Ohio and Indiana to veterans as payment for service. The US granted "so many acres of land" to George Rogers Clark and his men for their military service in the Illinois campaign against the British during the Revolutionary War. It became known as Clark's Grant. George Rogers Clark used the Trace to return to the Louisville area after his Illinois Campaign.

As the Continentals took control of the Illinois country during the Revolutionary War, the Trace became a busy overland route, which made it a target for Indian war parties. Clark's memoirs mentioned the Trace in describing an early Indian attack on traders in 1779, after Hamilton surrendered at Fort Sackville and Clark's militia controlled Vincennes. He led his force against the Indians in the Battle of the White River Forks. Richard "Dickie" Clark (1760–c. 1784), the younger brother of General George Rogers Clark and Captain William Clark, disappeared while traveling along the Trace in 1784. He had left Clarksville, to travel alone to Vincennes. Accounts varied: one said that his horse had been found with saddlebags bearing his initials. Another account said his horse's bones were found with Clark's bags nearby. His remains were never found. There was speculation that he was killed by Indians or thieves in the area, but historian William Hayden English concluded that he probably drowned while crossing a river.

Several written accounts by explorers, the military, and settlers document the Trace's use as an overland route. In 1785 and 1786 explorer John Filson travelled by river to Vincennes and returned to the Falls of the Ohio via the Trace; he documented his travels along the road. Filson's overland route took nine days. General Josiah Harmar, Commander of the Army of the Ohio, kept a log when he led the First American Regiment on a return march from Vincennes in 1786. Following the Treaty of Greenville in 1795, settlers poured into the western territories. Many of them kept journals, recording their observations along the Trace.

In late 1799 U.S. postmaster Joseph Habersham established a mail route from Louisville through Vincennes to Kaskaskia, Illinois at the Mississippi River along the Trace. The route began on 22 March 1800 and ran every four weeks. It was extended to Cahokia, Illinois the following year. Both of these were former French colonial settlements from the early 18th century.

In 1802 William Henry Harrison, governor of the Indiana Territory, recommended that the Trace be improved as a road suitable for wagon travel, with inns developed for travelers every thirty to forty miles. By 1804 the Trace was so well known that Harrison used it as a treaty boundary with Indians. The Vincennes treaty of 1804 gave the U.S. government possession of Indiana land from south of the Trace to the Ohio River, including the Trace itself. William Rector was hired to survey the treaty land in 1805. His survey notes provide an important record of the Buffalo Trace's route. Survey maps and field notes identified forty-three miles of the old trace road from Clark's Grant to the White River in southern Indiana.

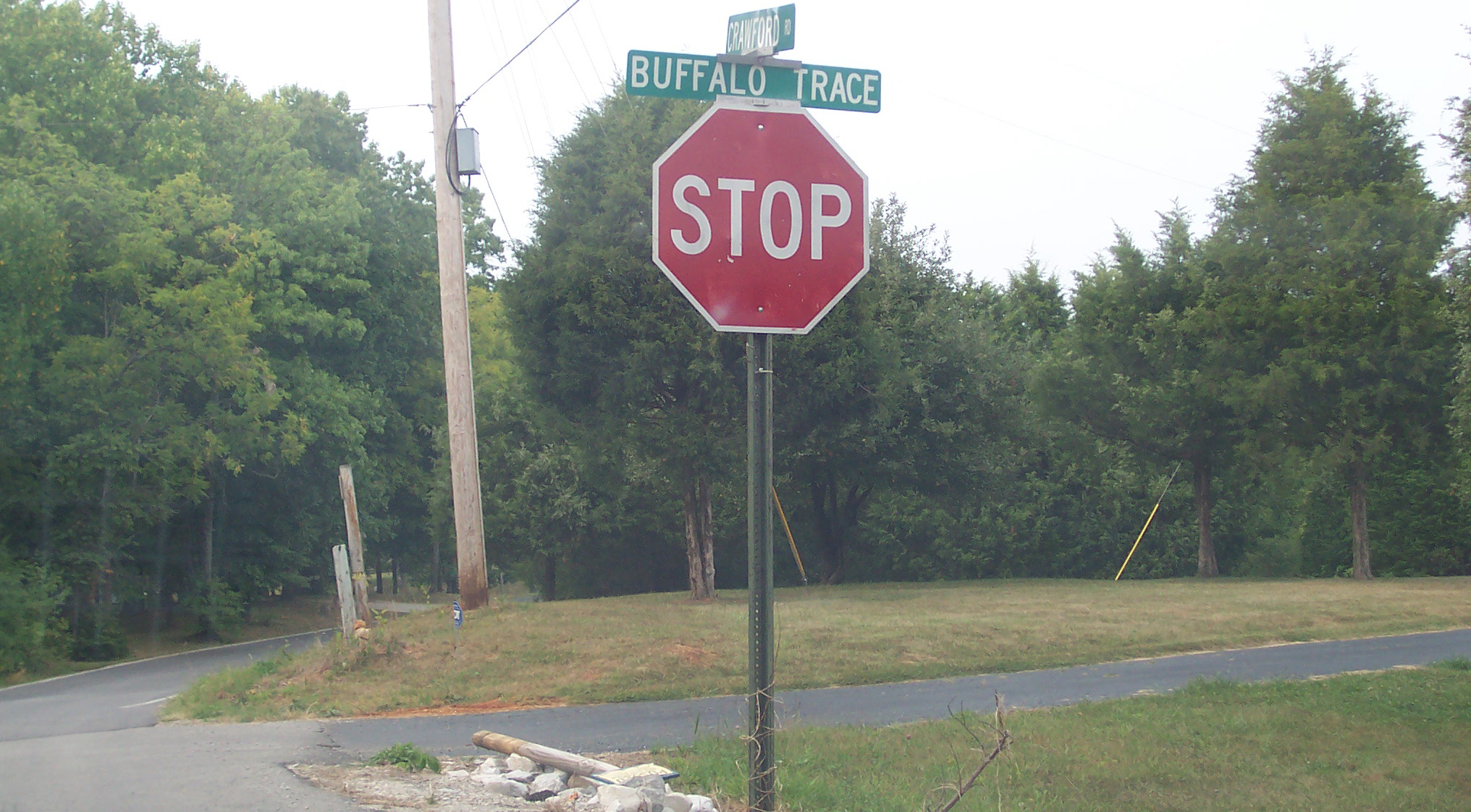
A road built on top of the old Trace in Morgan Township, Harrison County, Indiana

The Buffalo Trace was the primary travel route between the Louisville area and Vincennes; two-thirds of settlers traveling from the Louisville area into the interior of Indiana used the trace. Rangers were hired to protect travelers using the road, eventually doing so on horseback in 1812. During the War of 1812, Harrison assigned 150 men to patrol the Trace between Vincennes and Louisville, "so as to completely protect the citizens and the road."

Because the Trace remained the primary road across southern Indiana after the territory became a state in 1816, the state legislature had a road paved from New Albany to Vincennes as part of its internal improvements program. The road "approximated" the Trace's route. It was extended to Paoli, Indiana, after the state government leased operation of the road to a private organization as part of their negotiations to avoid bankruptcy. The paved road was called the "New Albany-Paoli Turnpike." The first stagecoach service in the state started in 1820 along the Trace; the route was from New Albany to Vincennes. The route served Floyd County, Indiana; the towns of Greenville, Galena, and Floyds Knobs in particular.

Other names for the Trace through its history have been Lan-an-zo-ki-mi-wi (or lenaswihkanawea, a Native American name meaning "bison trail" or "buffalo road"), the "Old Indian Road," the "Clarksville Trace," "Harrison's Road," the "Kentucky Road," the "Vincennes Trace," and the "Louisville Trace."

== Contemporary description ==
U.S. Route 150 from Vincennes to New Albany follows the path of the Trace. A large section of the original Trace can be seen south of French Lick in Orange County, Indiana, along the Springs Valley Trail System. In 2009 a section of U.S. Route 150 and the Buffalo Trace were designated as part of the Indiana Historic Pathways, a National Scenic Byway that crosses southern Indiana. In total, driving U.S. Route 150 to coincide with the Buffalo Trace is a distance of 112 miles (180 km).

Parts of the Trace are now protected, including sections in the Hoosier National Forest and a small tract within Buffalo Trace Park, a preserve maintained by Harrison County, Indiana. The development of towns and highways has effaced much of the original Trace. Survey notes, plat maps and other documents provide clues as archeologists continue to discover more sections, aided by modern technologies such as GIS and GNSS.

== See also ==
- History of Indiana
