= Boone Square =

Park in Louisville, Kentucky

Coordinates: 38.26149°N 85.7818°W

Boone Square is one of the Frederick Law Olmsted parks in Louisville, Kentucky. It is also one of the smaller ones, one full city block in size. In the middle of Louisville's working-class Portland neighborhood, it is bordered by 19th St. on the west, Duncan St. on the south, 20th St. on the east and Rowan St. on the north. It opened to the public on July 1, 1891.

== Design elements ==
A low stone wall encircles the park, except for entrances at the four corners and in the middle portion of each of the four sides. Embedded into the facing of the south wall are a number of plaques. One, describing the park as the location of Louisville's first organized baseball game. Another, indicating the design and layout of the park as designed by Olmsted. There is a group of play equipment, two full basketball courts, a baseball/softball diamond, a raised patio sprinkler for water play during summer months. There is also a small picnic gazebo on the North end of the park as well as a set of restrooms on the South.

== See also ==
- List of parks in the Louisville metropolitan area
