= Gnadinger Park =

Park

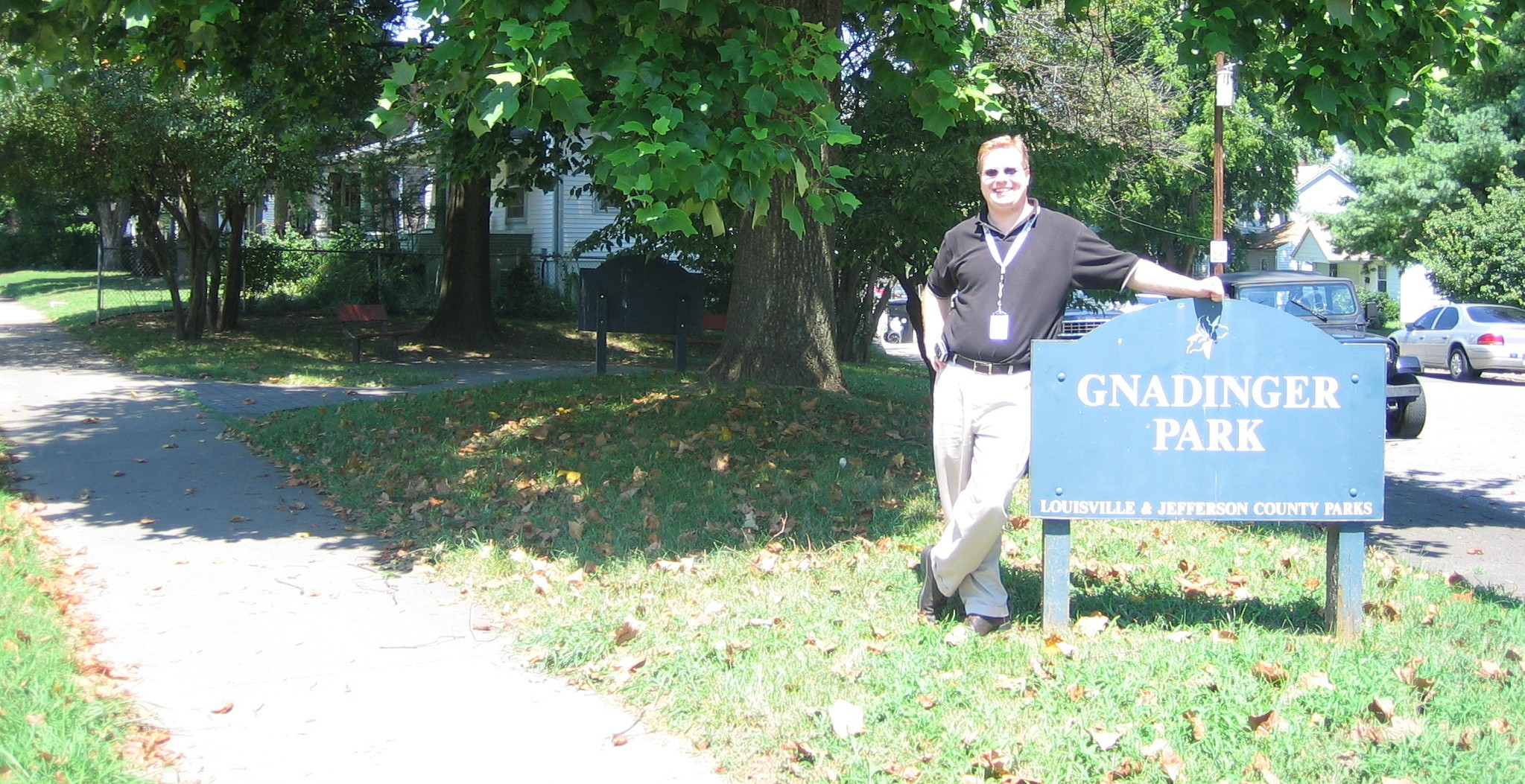
- Errin Gnadinger-Nash, grandnephew of Frank and Norb Gnadinger, and grandson of Carl Gnadinger next to the Gnadinger Park sign at the intersection of Reutlinger and Ellison Avenues in Louisville, Kentucky.
- Interactive map of Gnadinger Park
- Coordinates: 38.230094°N 85.733207°W
- Area: 0.03 acres (1,300 sq ft)
- Established: 1977; 49 years ago

Gnadinger Park is the smallest public park in Louisville, Kentucky. It is located in the Germantown neighborhood at the intersection of Reutlinger and Ellison Avenues. The property was donated to the City of Louisville and dedicated as a park in 1977. It is registered as being just 0.03 acres (1,300 square feet) in size. The property once belonged to Frank and Mary Gnadinger who had built a house on the property at 1027 Ellison Avenue in 1923.

In 1973, the Gnadinger family heard the German-Paristown Neighborhood Association in Louisville's Germantown neighborhood was seeking recreational space. After meeting with members of the nearby St. Therese of Lisieux Church, the Louisville Board of Aldermen, the Louisville Parks Department and the Louisville Development Cabinet, the seven Gnadinger family heirs and spouses agreed to transfer the property to the then City of Louisville.

Gnadinger Park was dedicated on April 7, 1977, with Louisville Mayor Harvey I. Sloane officiating. During the dedication, each Gnadinger family member was given a gold “Key to the City” pin.

== See also ==
- List of parks in the Louisville metropolitan area
