= Cherokee Park =

Municipal park in Kentucky, US

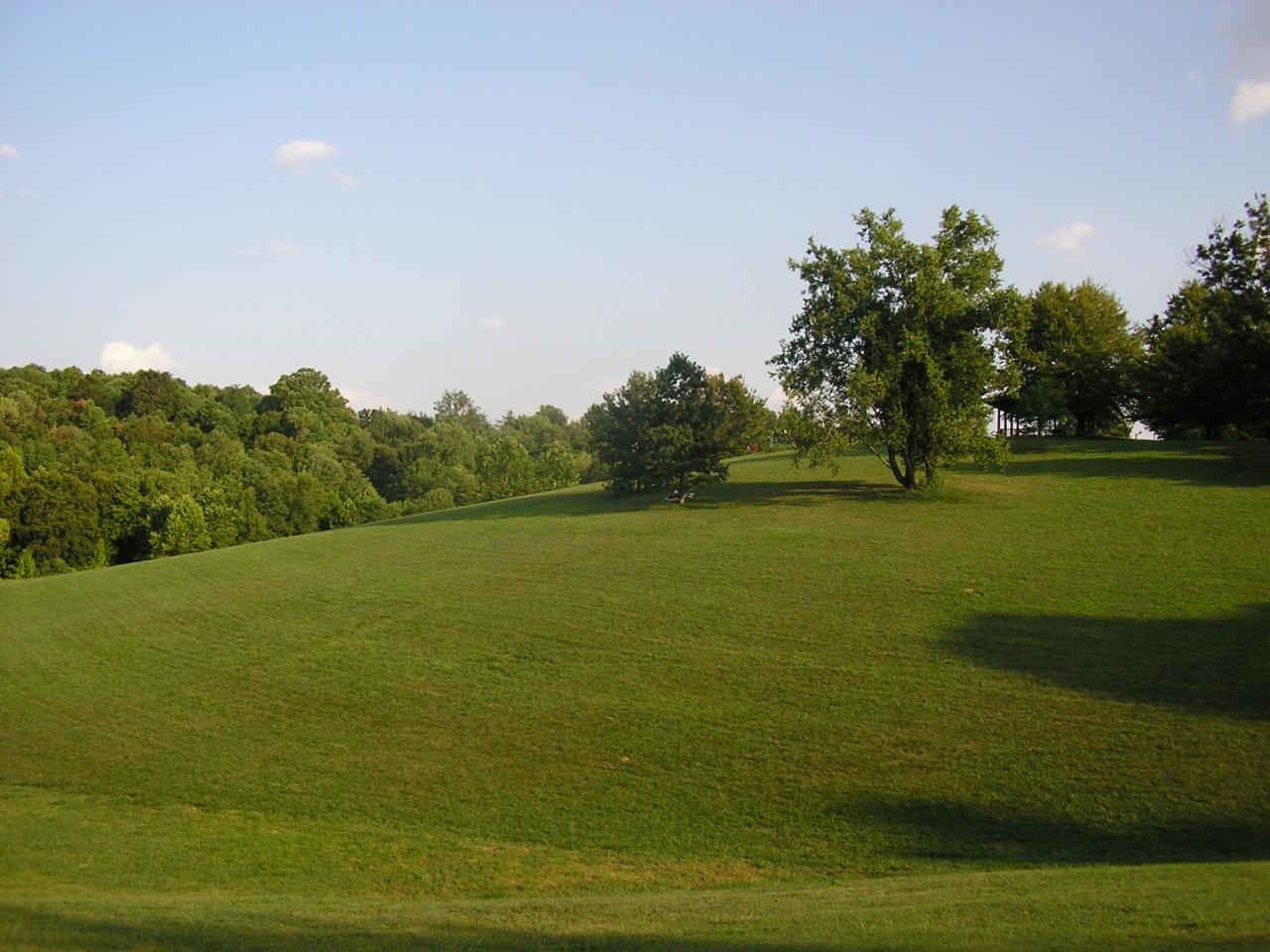
- Cherokee Park, Baringer Hill
- Interactive map of Cherokee Park
- Type: Municipal
- Location: East Louisville, Kentucky
- Coordinates: 38.24120°N 85.69690°W
- Area: 409 acres (166 ha)
- Created: 1891
- Operator: Louisville Metro Parks
- Website: City's park webpage

Cherokee Park is a 409-acre (166 ha) municipal park located in Louisville, Kentucky, United States, and is part of the Louisville Olmsted Parks Conservancy. It was designed in 1891 by Frederick Law Olmsted, the father of landscape architecture along with 18 of Louisville's 123 parks. Beargrass Creek runs through much of the park, and is crossed by numerous pedestrian and automobile bridges.

According to The Trust for Public Land, Cherokee Park has 500,000 visitors annually, making it tied for the 69th most popular municipal park in the United States.

In 2014, Louisville botanist Patricia Dalton Haragan published a flora of Cherokee Park and other parks designed by Frederick Law Olmsted

The park features a 2.4 mile Scenic Loop through the park's pastoral setting featuring rolling hills, open meadows and woodlands with separate lanes for vehicle traffic (one-way) and recreational users. The park was closed to vehicular traffic during the COVID-19 pandemic, with cars being allowed again after September 2021.

== History ==
Cherokee Park opened in 1891, has always been a major draw, and was a key factor in sparking development in nearby parts of town.

=== Pre-development ===
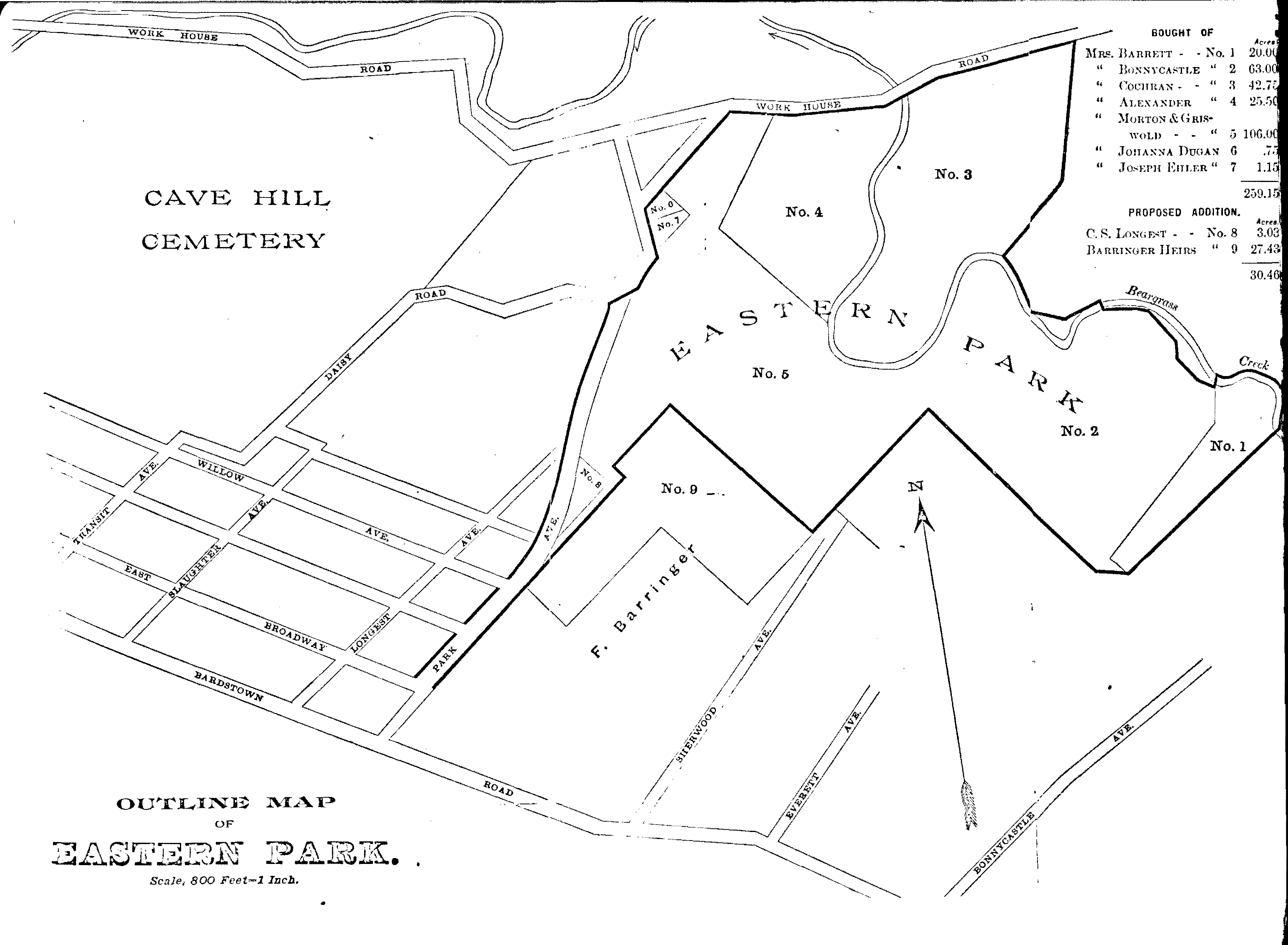
A map of the private land tracts that became Cherokee Park in 1893. Streets renamed since 1893 include Grinstead Drive (Daisy Lane) and Lexington Road (Work House Road).

The land comprising Cherokee Park was originally part of a 4,000-acre (16 km^{2}) military land grant in 1773 to James Southall and Richard Charlton.

A 43-acre (170,000 m^{2}) portion of the land passed to Judge Joshua Fry Bullitt, who sold it in 1868 to foundry magnate Archibald P. Cochran. Cochran established an estate there called Fern Cliff, which operated as a museum for a while but has since been demolished.

As the land was located around Beargrass Creek, it was hilly and ill-suited to farming. Prior to its conversion as a park, the land was used primarily for animal grazing, although much of it was wooded. By 1893 the land was carved into six estates, including Cochran's (which was sold to the city after his death in 1889). The other estates belonged to the Bonnycastle 63 acres (250,000 m^{2}), Barret 20 acres (81,000 m^{2}), Morton & Griswold 106 acres (0.43 km^{2}), Alexander 25 acres (100,000 m^{2}) families, respectively. Those and two small lots under 1-acre (4,000 m^{2}) were bought by 1891. Additional land from the Longest, Barringer and Belknap families would be added to expand the park to its modern size.

=== Park development ===
In 1887, a city park system was proposed with three large suburban parks: east, west and south. The initial name of the eastern park was to be Beargrass Park, but in 1891, as was fashionable in the late 19th century, a name that evoked the romantic imagery of Native Americans was chosen.

Cochran's name lives on in Cochran Hill, which became notable in the late 1960s when two tunnels were dug under it at a cost of $1.9 million so that I-64 would not have as extreme an impact on the park as it was run through it. The twin tunnels remain, running for about 425 feet (130 m) in length under the hill. Various groups, including one called Save Our Parks, formed as early as the 1940s to oppose running highways through the parks, and were largely responsible for forcing a tunnel as a compromise.

The tunnels, which opened in 1970, are one of three sites in Kentucky deemed "exceptionally significant" by the Federal Highway Administration. This designation, in turn, means it will be very difficult for the stretch of interstate running through the park ever to be widened.

In 2010, a proposal by the city to replace the Hogan's Fountain Pavilion with two smaller structures created public opposition that led to a citizen fundraising effort to repair the existing structure, rather than replace it.

=== Tornado damage in 1974 ===
Much of the park was heavily damaged in the April 3, 1974, tornado Super Outbreak. The tornado was an F4 on the Fujita scale. A city forester surveying the aftermath said, "I don't believe that anyone alive today will see Cherokee Park as it was before the storm."

Because of the loss of thousands of mature trees, a massive re-planting effort was undertaken, financed in large part by a grant from the United States government under the Disaster Relief Act of 1974. However, to qualify for these funds, the park had to be restored to its pre-tornado design as faithfully as possible. The original Olmsted plans were consulted for the park's "rebirth" (as it was called at the time), with 2,500 trees and 4,600 shrubs planted in the restoration effort.

=== Crime ===
Vandalism and petty crime has long plagued Cherokee Park. Vandalism was reported as early as 1936. In the 1950s into the mid-1960s newspapers reported with amusement on the serial theft of elements of the Hogan's Fountain monument – especially a bronze turtle – with headlines such as "Cherokee Park Turtle on the Loose Again" and "Bronze Turtle Steps Lively – Flees Cherokee Park Nest". According to a park commissioner, after the vandals saw the stories in print, they would always deposit the stolen pieces, which weighed about 100 pounds, somewhere in the park. Eventually, they were all bolted down from beneath such that vandals were unable to remove them. More seriously, the Daniel Boone statue at the park's Eastern Parkway entrance was toppled on May 21, 1962, causing severe damage to it. Park officials claimed police had seen but not arrested a crowd of youths drinking openly near the statue earlier in the day, police denied the charge.

A 1970 newspaper article looked back on the tradition of turtle thievery with nostalgia, reporting that Hogan's Fountain had by the 1970s become a nightly gathering place for hundreds of teenagers, who openly sold and used drugs, despite an increasing police presence, usually arresting youths on loitering charges and chasing out dealers of more serious drugs such as heroin.

Portions of the park were redesigned both to remove popular loitering locations and to increase the park's usability to families and individuals for recreation. Combined with an increased police presence, these tactics greatly deterred drug use and gay cruising, however vandalism remains a minor problem. During periods of good weather, the park is invariably full of local residents engaged in a wide range of fitness activities as well as leisurely strolling or picnicking. On those rare occasions that two or more inches of snow fall, hundreds of locals take to the parks hills for informal sledding and snowboarding.

== Landmarks ==
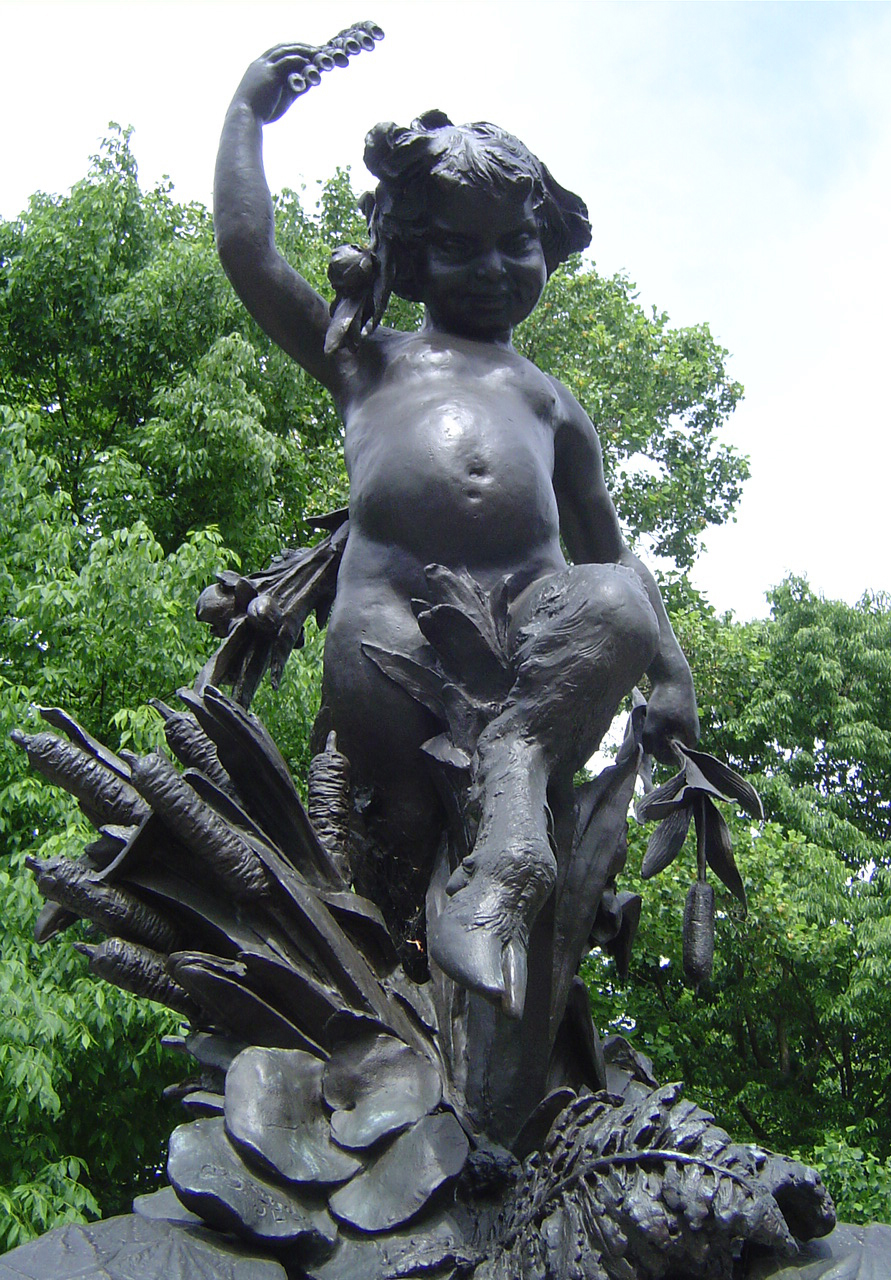
Detail of the Enid Yandell statue at Hogan's Fountain

Cherokee Park contains many landmarks and points of interest. Many are self-contained areas within the larger park, set apart from each other by the natural terrain and creative use of landscaping. Because of the size and design of the park, many events can occur at the same time without interrupting each other.

- Big Rock – A large rock in Beargrass Creek, which also lends its name to a picnic area and playground nearby. The rock itself is used for picnics, and as an ill-advised jumping spot (its flat surface offers about an 8-foot (2.4 m) drop into the shallow creek water below). There is an open shelter building at Big Rock which was built in 1910 as a memorial to George Gaulbert, it was designed by William J. Dodd.
- Scenic Loop – A 2.43-mile (3.9-km) mixed-use road around much of the park, with separate lanes for pedestrians and motorized vehicles.
- Frisbee Field – A large open field used for many purposes, most commonly soccer and Ultimate.
- Baringer Hill – Commonly called "Dog Hill", "Kite Hill", or "Hill Number One". Once popular for kites, after a renovation in the late 1990s it has become better known as a gathering point for dog owners. A fenced dog park located at the top of Cochran Hill opened in 2007.
- Hogan's Fountain – A dog- and horse-watering fountain located atop a hill on the Scenic Loop, Hogan's Fountain was financed by the Hogan Family of Anchorage, Kentucky, in 1905. The fountain was sculpted by Enid Yandell, and features the Greek God Pan. It was officially unveiled on August 31, 1905. The name Hogan's Fountain is also often extended to the nearby hilltop area, which includes a large gazebo, baseball diamond, children's fountains and a basketball court. This spot was once known as Bonnycastle Hill. Hogan's Fountain is a popular place for group meetings, family reunions and picnics.
- Lover's Lane – A secluded, heavily forested stretch of scenic loop just past Hogan's Fountain.
- Cochran Hill – A hillside between Frisbee Field and Lexington Road, and site of a dog park.
- Christensen Fountain – A recently restored fountain near the Lexington Road entrance.
- Nettleroth Bird Sanctuary – Located in a quiet corner of the park, between Scenic Loop and a residential neighborhood.
- Belknap Bridge – When Lily Buckner Belknap died in 1893, her husband Col. Morris Burke Belknap constructed a stone bridge in Cherokee Park in her honor.

== Entrances ==
The park is situated in the Highlands. As the city of Louisville expanded around the park, many developers donated land to the park in exchange for the right to connect roads to it. The numerous entrances have made navigating the park notoriously confusing to visitors. Neighborhoods with entrances to the park include Cherokee Triangle, Bonnycastle, Highlands-Douglass, Crescent Hill and Seneca Gardens.

== Features ==
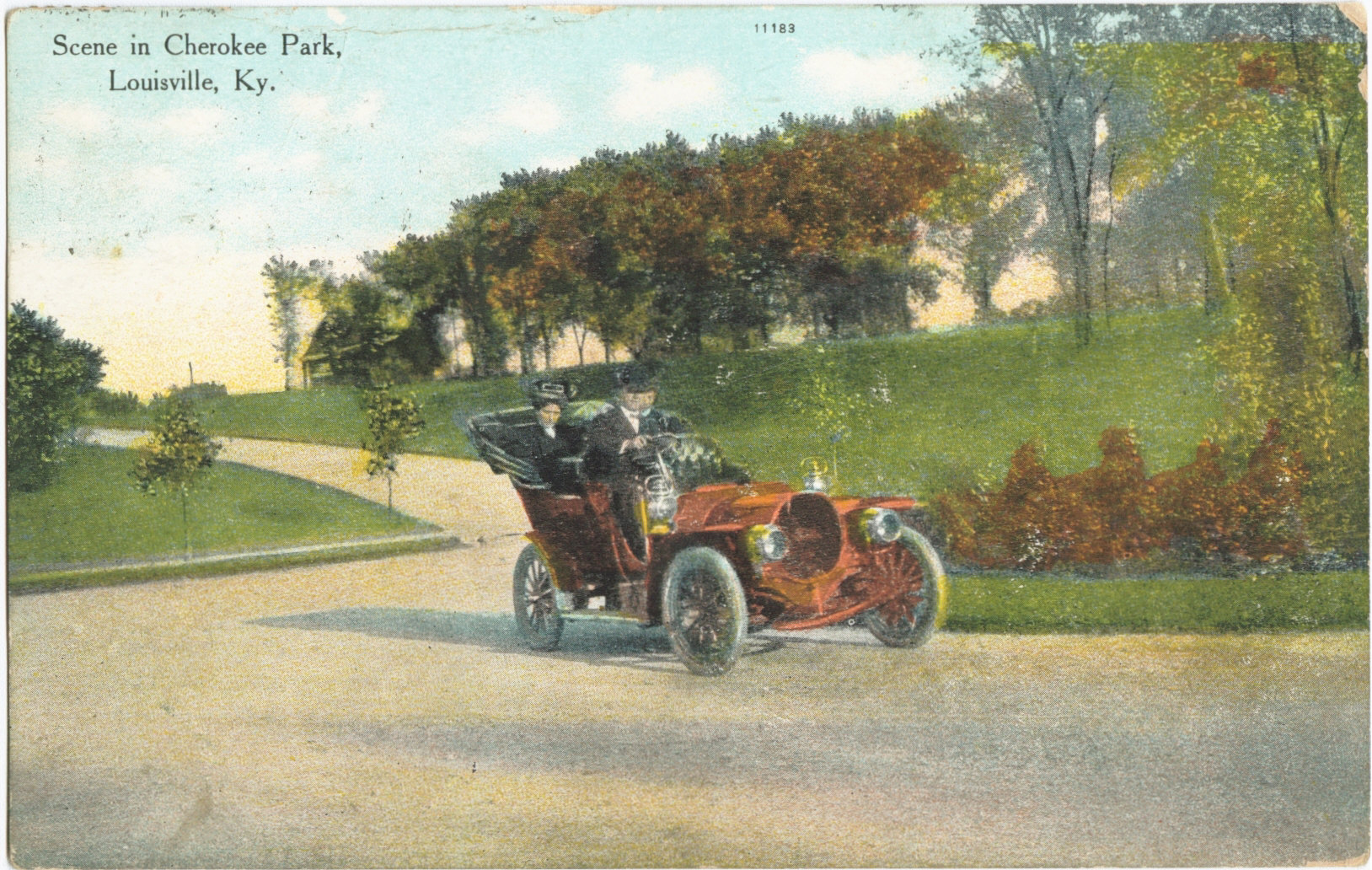
Postcard of a scene from Cherokee Park at the base of Baringer Hill, early 20th century

- Archery range – Near Beals Branch Road
- Ballfield – At Hogan's Fountain
- Baringer Spring – Rustic stream crossed by several wide wooden bridges and scenic walkways, entrances at Frisbee Field and at Baringer Hill
- Fullcourt basketball – At Hogan's Fountain
- Bike trail – Throughout park, crosses the scenic loop in many places. The scenic loop itself, with two moderately steep hills, is popular with road bikers.
- Bridle trail
- Golf course & clubhouse (9 holes). Opened in 1907.
- Hiking trails – All are mixed-use trails
- Horseshoe pits – At Hogan's Fountain
- Picnic pavilions – Large pagoda-style structure at Hogan's Fountain (demolished July 2023)
- Picnic tables – At and near Hogan's Fountain
- Playgrounds – At Hogan's Fountain, Big Rock and Baringer Hill
- Rugby field – Also used for Frisbee and Soccer
- Restrooms – At Baringer Hill, Hogan's Fountain and Big Rock
- Spray pool – At Hogan's Fountain
- Willow Pond – Off Grinstead Drive, next to golf course (sometimes referred to incorrectly by locals as "Cherokee Lake"). Features in holes 5 and 6 on the golf course, and is crossed by the tee shot on hole 6. Stocked with bass, bluegill, carp, catfish and is seasonally stocked with trout by the state fish & wildlife agency.
- Gravity hill – On the Scenic Loop between Eastern Parkway and Barney Street.
- Dog run – Opened August 2007, located atop Cochran Hill

== Activities ==
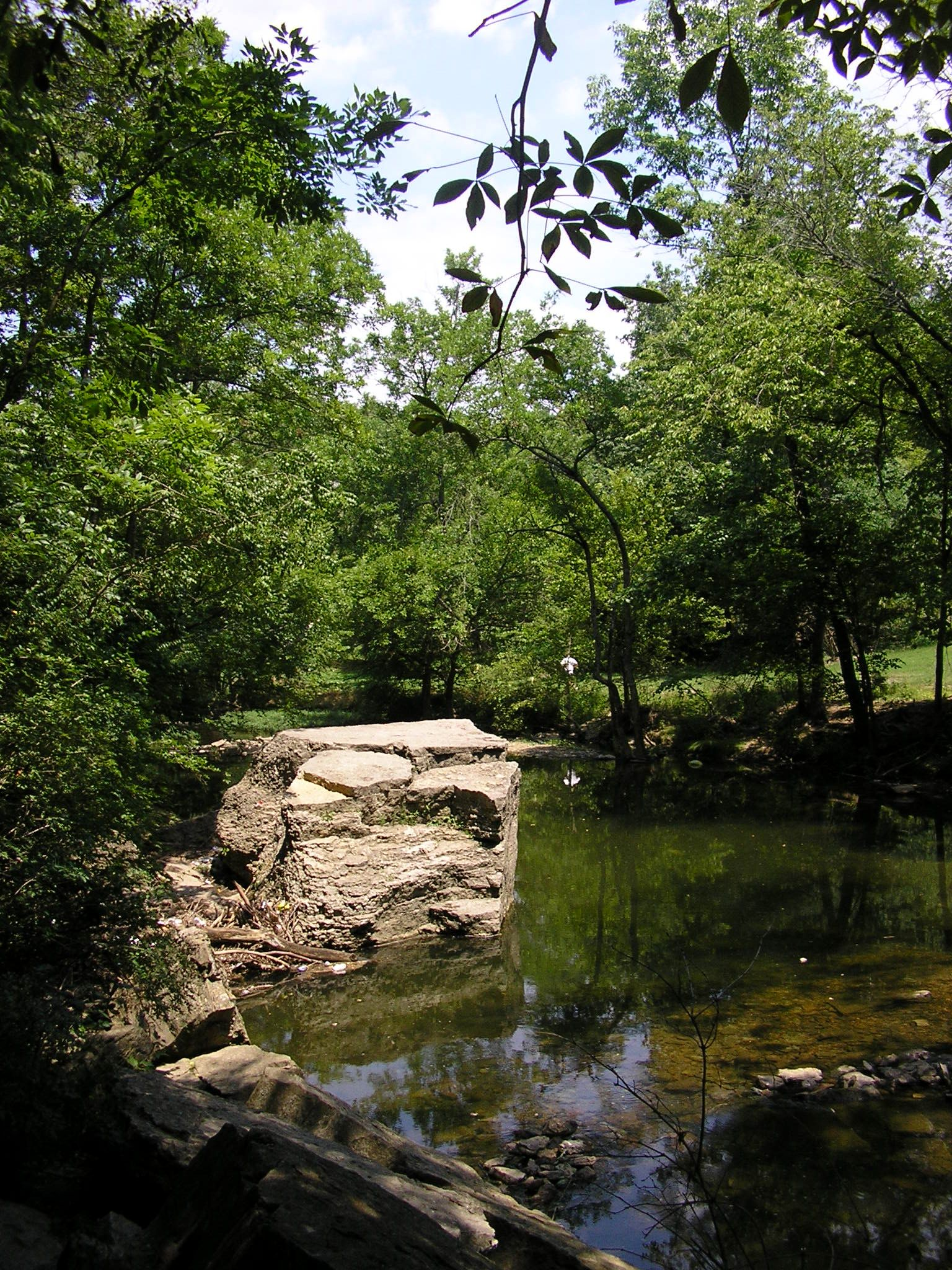
Big Rock

- Archery
- Baseball
- Basketball
- Bike riding (trails and road)
- Dog walking (Baringer Hill – aka "Dog Hill")
- Fishing (willow pond)
- Football
- Geocaching
- Golf
- Ham radio, ARRL Field Day – 4th full weekend in June
- Live action role-playing
- Picnics
- Rugby
- Running and jogging
- Sledding
- Soccer
- Ultimate frisbee
- Walking and hiking
- Weddings (occasionally)

== Plants and animals ==
Cherokee Park supports a variety of native wildlife, including white-tailed deer, raccoons, gray foxes, squirrels, turtles, snakes, birds of prey, and several species of salamander. Songbird species have been documented in the park by the Beckham Bird Club and other naturalists.

More recently, reports of coyotes in the park have become more widespread. A 2016 Louisville Magazine article noted that "Cherokee Park acts as Costco for coyotes: squirrels, mice and chipmunks in bulk for eating, water to drink and hollow tree trunks or dense thickets galore for shelter."

== See also ==
- City of Parks
- List of attractions and events in the Louisville metropolitan area
- List of parks in the Louisville metropolitan area
