= Buffalo Trace Park =

Public park preserve in Harrison County, Indiana

Coordinates: 38.409381°N 86.102346°W

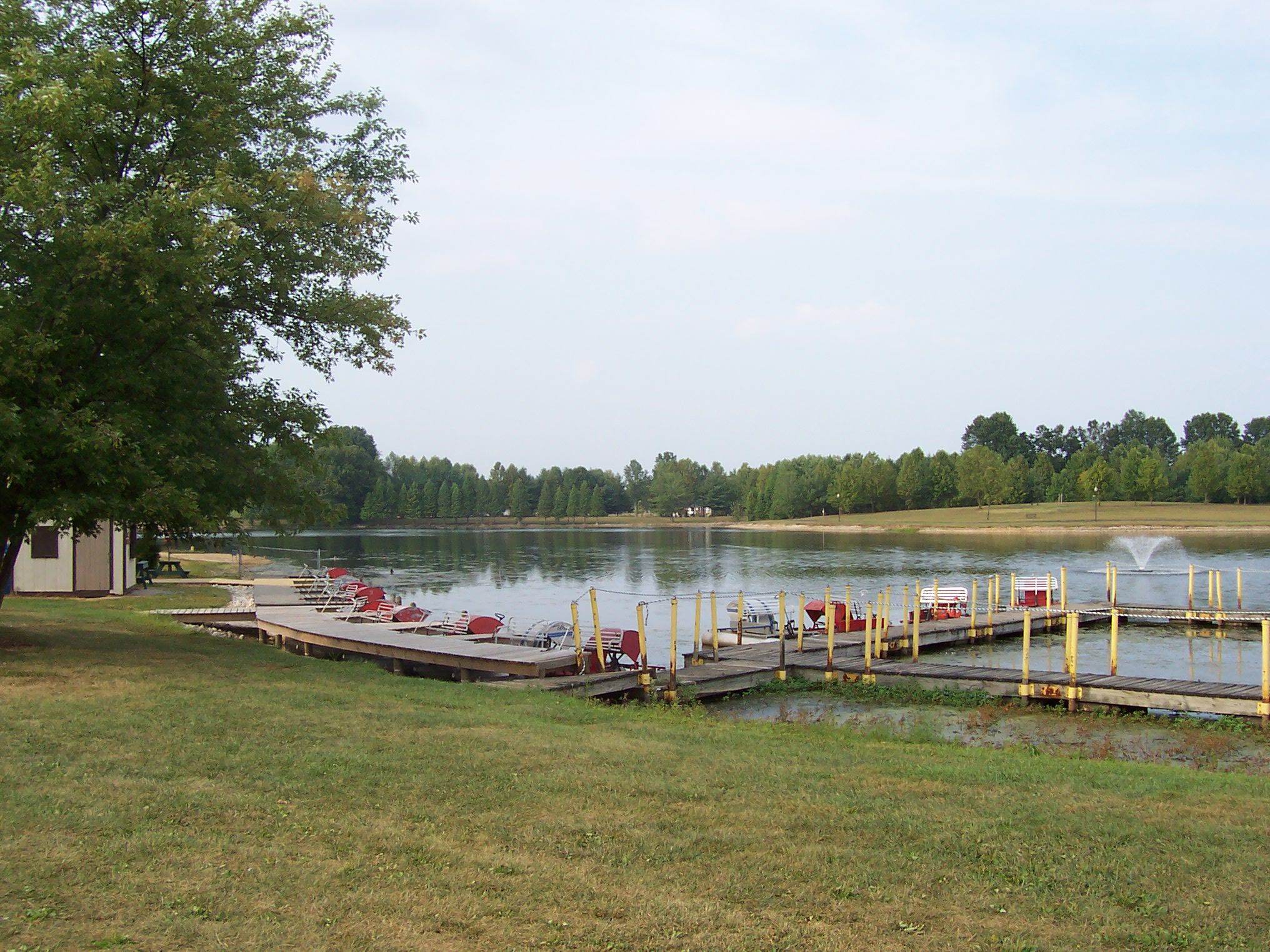
Coleman Lake at Buffalo Trace Park

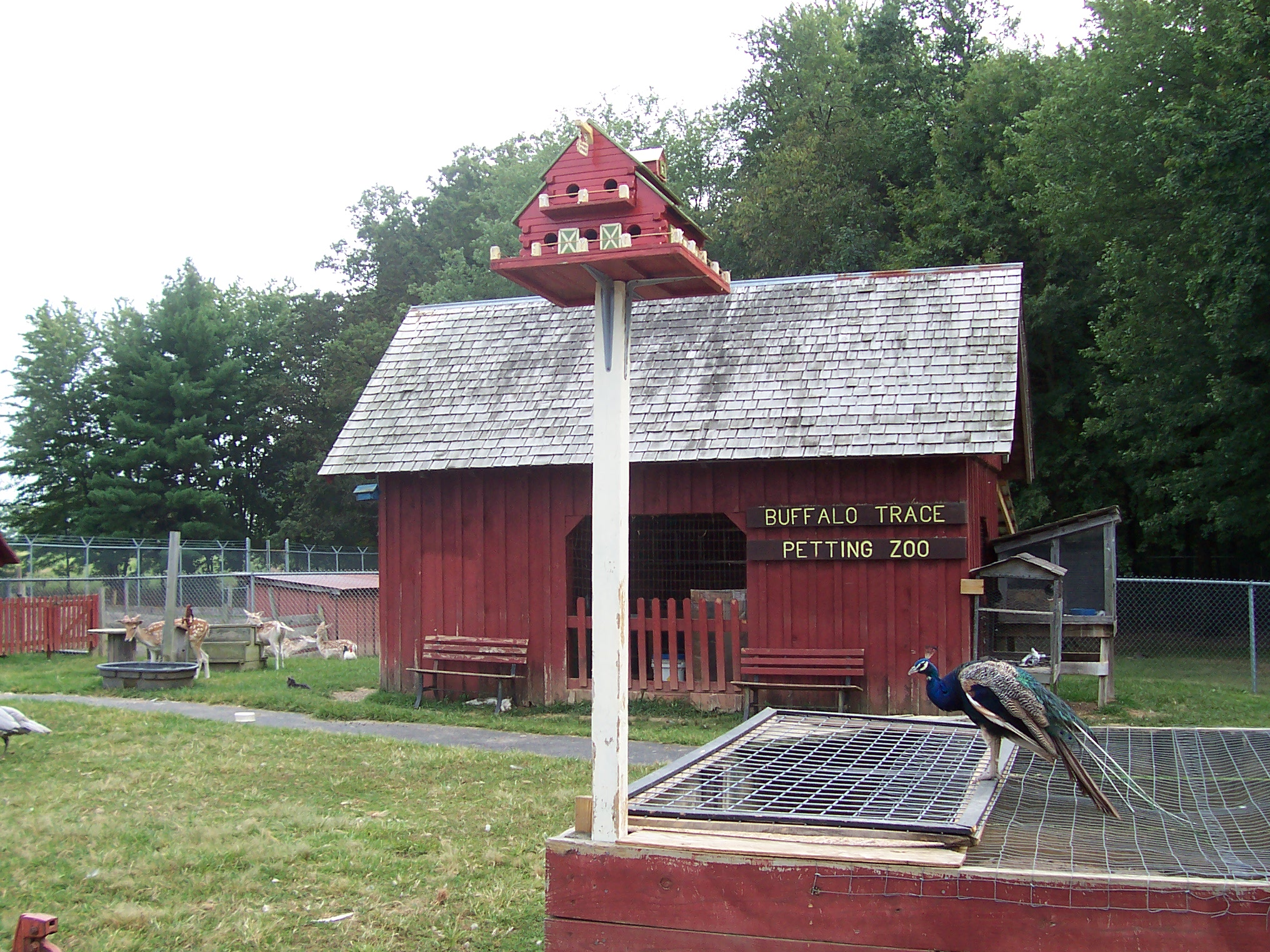
Petting zoo

Buffalo Trace Park is a 147-acre (0.59 km^{2}) public park preserve in northern Harrison County, Indiana near the town of Palmyra, Indiana. The park is along the edge of the old Buffalo Trace, a historic bison migration trail that was later converted into a road. In 1971, the 30-acre (120,000 m^{2}) man-made Lake Coleman was added to the park and stocked with fish, and is maintained by the Indiana Department of Natural Resources. The park's amenities include public camping, fishing, a public beach, petting zoo, walking paths, playgrounds, boating, an 18-hole disc golf course and ball courts. The park is owned by Harrison County and managed by the Harrison County Park and Recreation Department.

== See also ==
- List of parks in the Louisville metropolitan area
