= List of parks in the Louisville metropolitan area =

The following is a list of parks, forests and nature preserves in the Louisville metropolitan area.

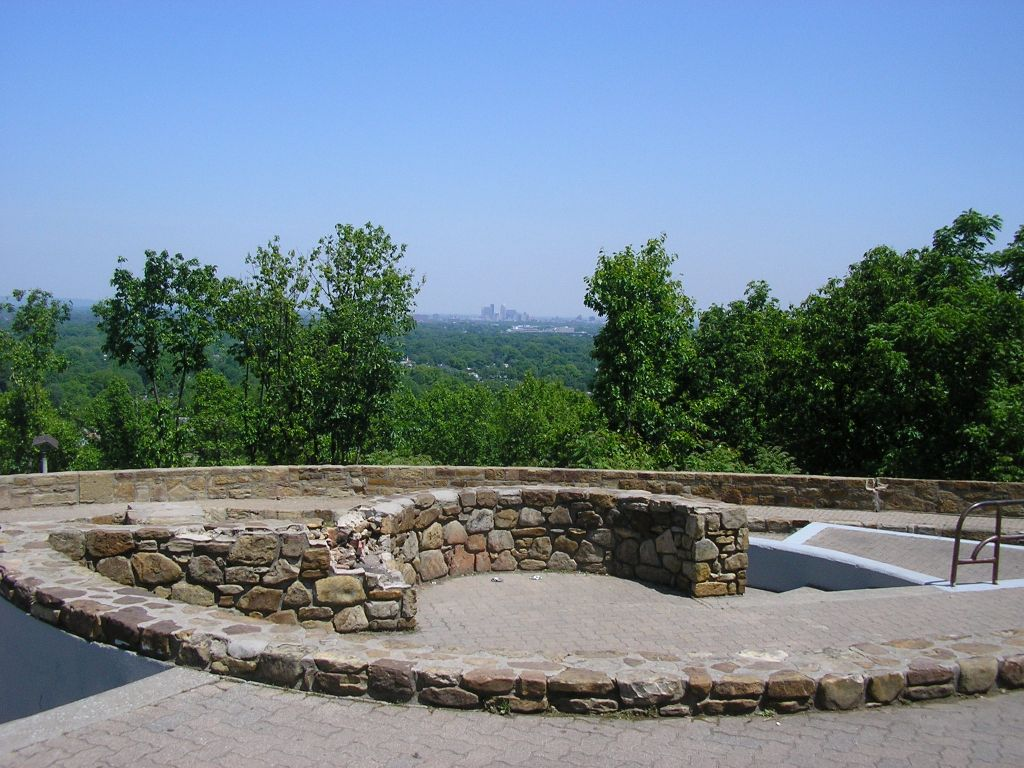
View of Downtown Louisville from the overlook atop Iroquois Park.

== Louisville Metro (Jefferson County) ==
=== Frederick Law Olmsted Parks ===
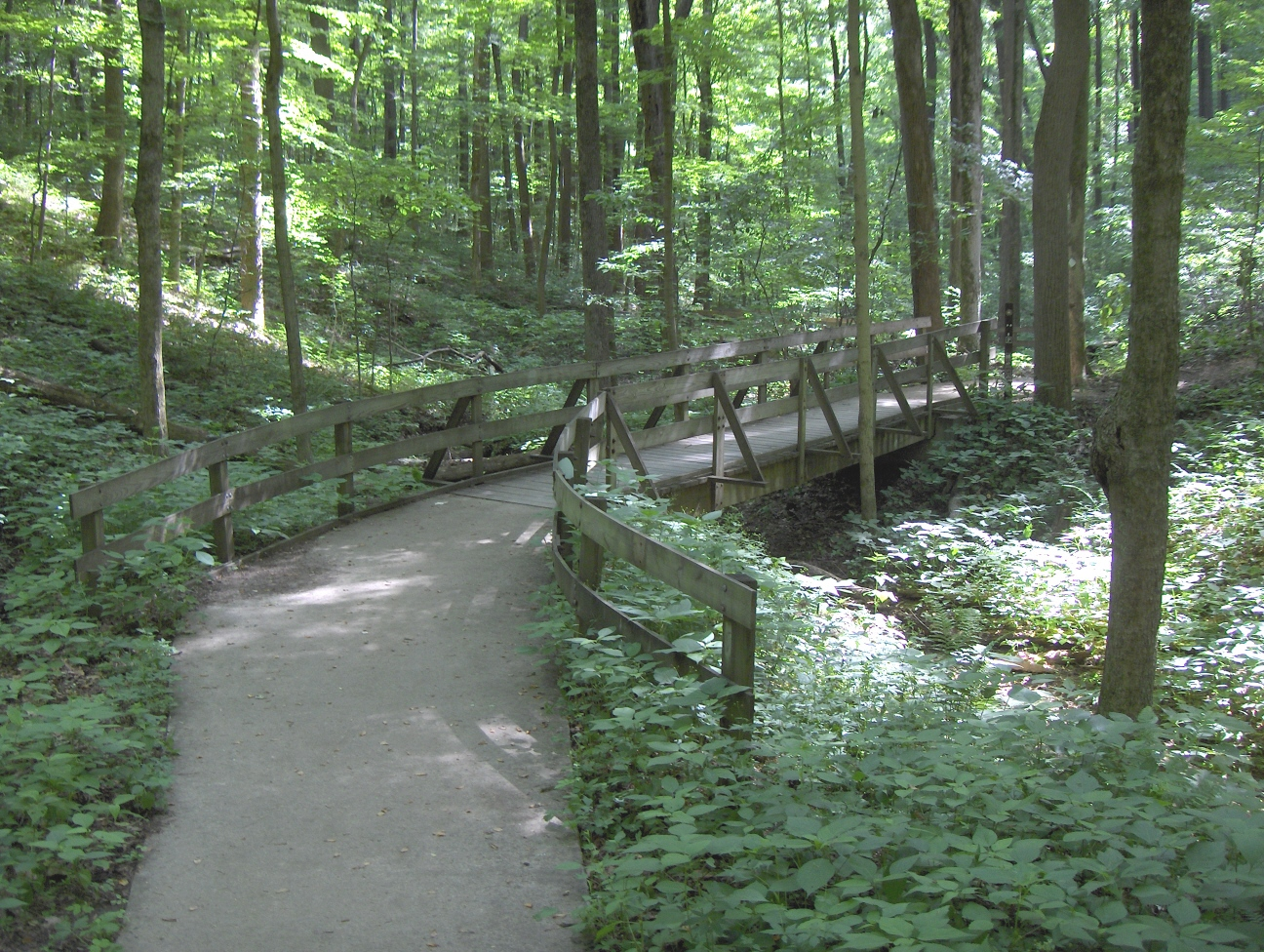
The Jefferson Memorial Forest is the largest municipal urban forest in the United States.

The Frederick Law Olmsted Parks (formerly called the Olmsted Park System) in Louisville was the last of five such systems designed by Frederick Law Olmsted. All of the parks in this system are managed by Louisville Metro Parks.

==== Flagship ====
- Cherokee Park
- Iroquois Park
- Shawnee Park

==== Other Olmsted parks ====
- Algonquin Park
- Baxter Square
- Bingham Park — Originally known as Clifton Park (Locals called it Coral Park)

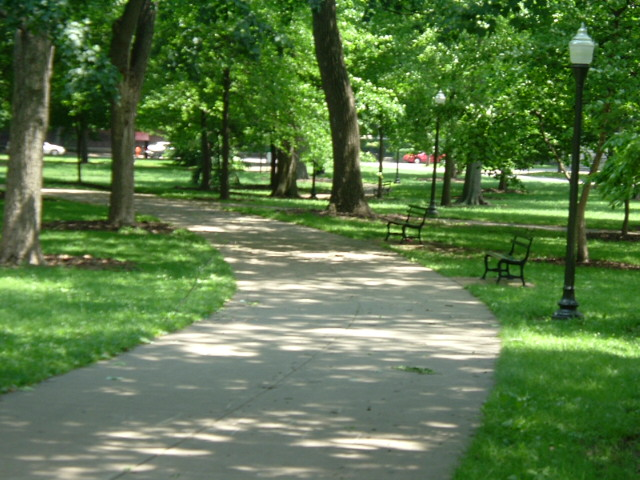
Walking trails in Central Park, located in the Old Louisville neighborhood.

- Boone Square
- Central Park
- Chickasaw Park
- Churchill Park
- Elliott Square
- Seneca Park
- Shelby Park
- William B. Stansbury Park — Originally known as Triangle Park
- Tyler Park
- Victory Park
- Wayside Park
- Willow Park — Originally part of the main entrance to Cherokee Park

==== Parkways ====
- Algonquin Parkway
- Eastern Parkway
- Northwestern Parkway
- Southern Parkway
- Southwestern Parkway

=== Other parks managed by Louisville Metro Parks ===
- 35th Street Park
- David Armstrong Extreme Park
- Auburndale Park
- Ballard Park
- Eva Bandman Park – Cyclocross venue and site of the 2013 World Championships
- Beargrass Creek Greenway at Irish Hill
- Beechmont Tot Lot
- Bellevue Park
- Berrytown Park
- Black Mudd Park
- Blue Lick Park
- Bradley Park
- Breslin Park
- William Britt Park
- Buechel Park
- California Park
- Camp Taylor Memorial Park
- Cane Run Park
- Caperton Swamp
- Castlewood Open Space
- George Rogers Clark Park
- Cliff Park
- Clifton Park
- Carrie Gaulbert Cox Park
- Joe Creason Park
- Crescent Hill Park
- Crosby Park
- Des Pres Park
- Douglass Park
- Dumeyer Park
- Eastover Park
- Eastwood Park
- Fairmount Falls Park
- Farman Park
- Farnsley Park
- Fern Creek Park
- Fisherman's Park
- Flaget Field Park
- Floyd's Fork Park
- German-Paristown Park
- Gnadinger Park
- William Harrison Park
- Highview Park
- Nelson Hornbeck Park
- Hounz Lane Park
- Irish Hill Park
- Louis B. Israel Park
- Ivy Court Park
- Jefferson Memorial Forest – Largest municipal urban forest in the U.S., operated as a park by Metro Parks
- Alberta O. Jones Park
- Kennedy Court Park
- Hays Kennedy Park
- Klondike Park
- Kulmer Reserve
- Lake Dreamland Park
- Lampton Park
- Lannan Park
- LaPorte Park
- Russell Lee Park
- Liberty Bell Playground
- Locust Grove – Historic home and residence of George Rogers Clark
- Long Run Park
- Louisville Champions Park
- Magnolia Park
- McNeely Lake Park
- Medora Park
- Memorial Park
- William F. Miles Park
- G.G. Moore Park
- Nightingale Park
- Norfolk Acres Park
- Okolona Park
- Old Walnut/Beecher Park
- Parkhill Park
- Patterson Playground
- PeeWee Park
- Petersburg Park
- Portland Park
- Portland Wharf Park
- Huston Quin Park
- Ginny Reichard Park
- Riverside Gardens Park
- Riverside, The Farnsley-Moremen Landing – Historic home and river landing
- Riverview Park
- Roberson Run Park
- Rubel Park
- A.B. Sawyer Park
- Sheppard Park
- Slevin Park
- South Central Park
- St. Louis Park
- Story Avenue Park
- Sun Valley Park
- Sylvania Park
- E. Leland Taylor (Jewell) Park
- Thurman Hutchins Park
- Toonerville Trolley Park
- Twin Park
- Charlie Vettiner Park
- Ben Washer Park
- Watterson Lake Park
- Waverly Park – Includes the 9-hole Bobby Nichols Golf Course
- Westonia Park
- Wyandotte Park
- Charles Young Park

=== Parks not managed by Louisville Metro Parks ===
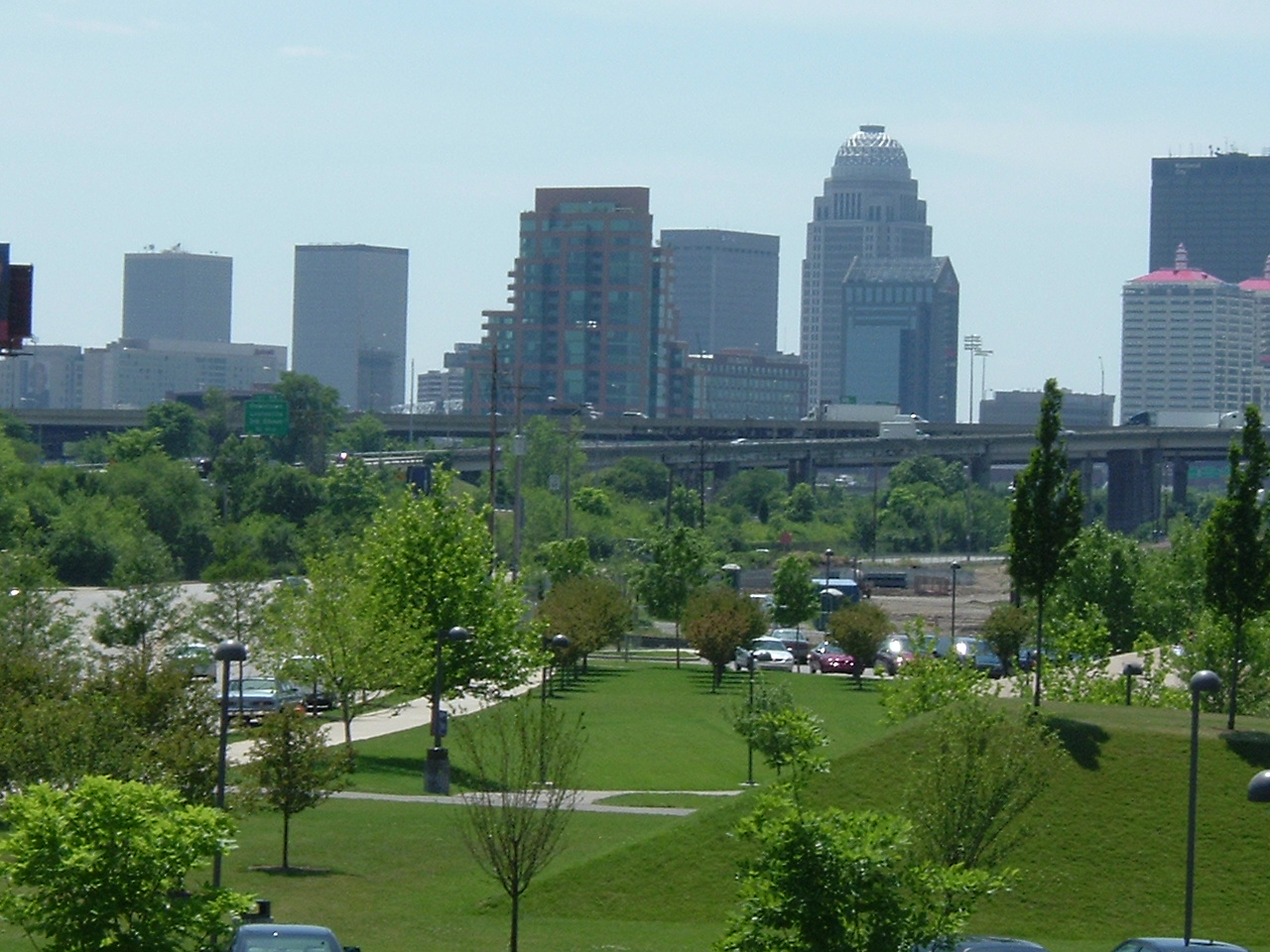
Louisville Waterfront Park, once an industrial wasteland, Louisville's reclaimed waterfront now features trees and walking paths

- Auburn Park (Jeffersontown)
- Beargrass Creek State Nature Preserve
- Blackacre Nature Preserve and Historic Homestead
- Bowling Park (St. Matthews)
- Brown Park (St. Matthews)
- Dayton Avenue Park (St. Matthews)
- Arthur K. Draut Park (St. Matthews)
- Fort Nelson Park
- Founder's Square
- Garvin Brown Nature Preserve
- Harrods Creek Park (Prospect)
- Jefferson Square
- Louisville Waterfront Park
- The Parklands of Floyds Fork:
  - Beckley Creek Park
  - Pope Lick Park
  - Broad Run Park
  - The Strand
  - Turkey Run Park
- Riverfront Plaza/Belvedere
- Robison Park (Lyndon)
- St. Matthews Park/Community Center
- E. P. "Tom" Sawyer State Park
- Shively Park (Shively)
- Six Mile Island State Nature Preserve
- Skyview Park (Jeffersontown)
- Veterans Memorial Park (Jeffersontown)
- Warwick Park (St. Matthews)

== Kentucky metropolitan counties outside Jefferson ==
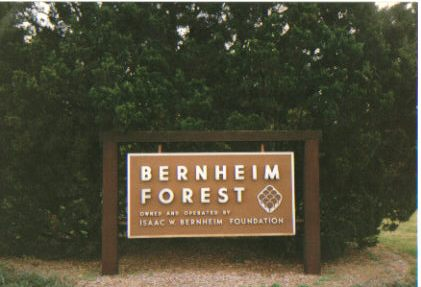
Sign at the entrance of Bernheim Arboretum and Research Forest, 25 miles south of Louisville.

=== Bullitt ===
- Bernheim Arboretum and Research Forest

=== Meade ===
- Otter Creek Outdoor Recreation Area — Operated by the Kentucky Department of Fish and Wildlife Resources

=== Nelson ===
- Bardstown Community Park
- Dean Watts Park (Bardstown)
- My Old Kentucky Home State Park
- Jones Avenue Park (Bardstown)
- Woodson/Rogers Park (Bardstown)

=== Oldham ===
- John T. Walsh Park (La Grange)
- Wendell Moore Park (Buckner)
- Wilborn Park (La Grange)
- Yew Dell Gardens (Crestwood)
- Creasy Mahan Nature Preserve (Goshen)
- Community Convention and Aquatic Center (Buckner)

=== Shelby ===
- Clear Creek Park (Shelbyville)

=== Spencer ===
- Taylorsville Lake State Park — includes Taylorsville Lake, which extends into Nelson and Anderson Counties.

=== Trimble ===
- Milton City Park (Milton)
- Trimble County Park (Bedford)

== Indiana metropolitan counties ==
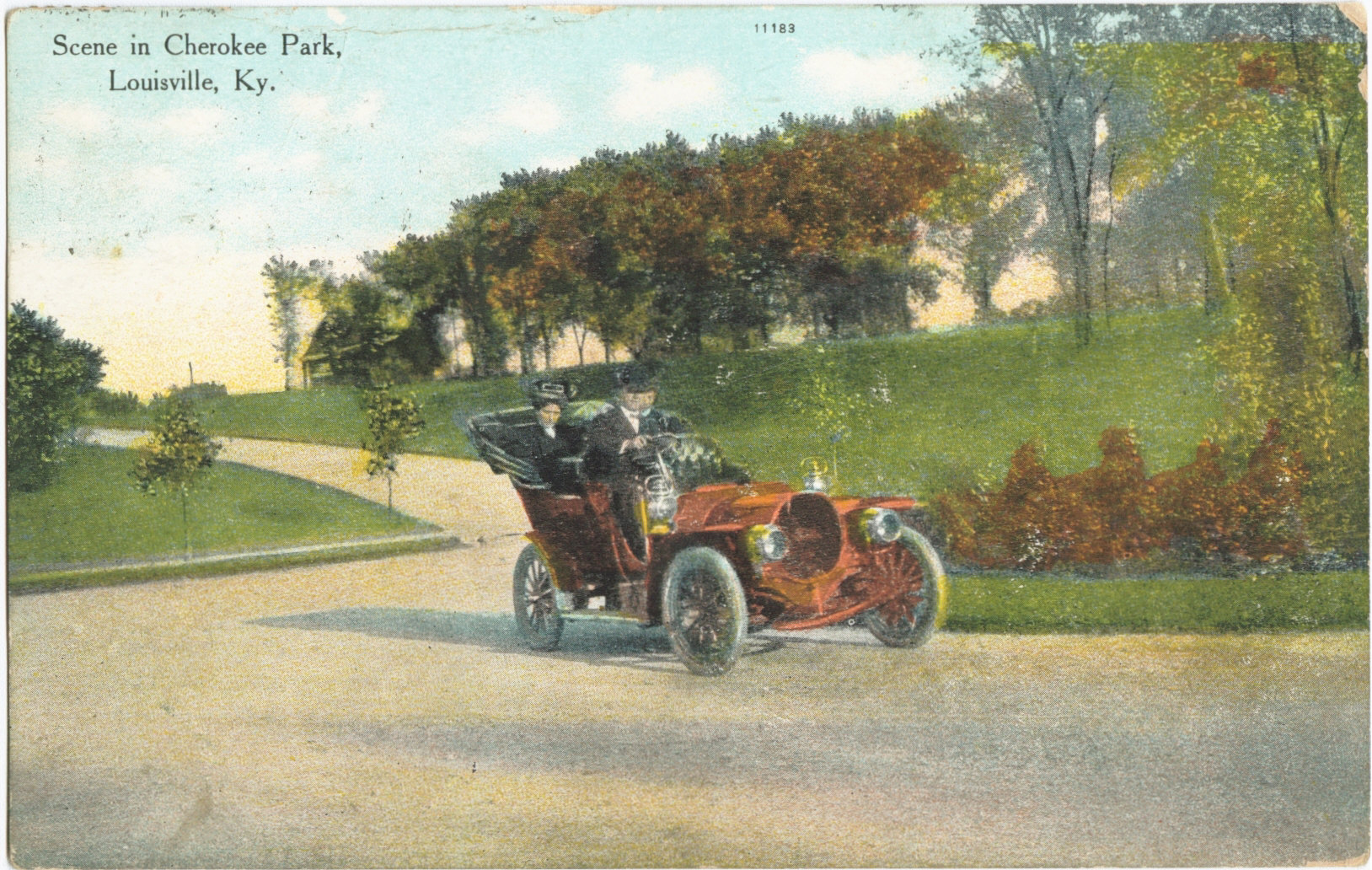
Postcard of a scene from Cherokee Park at the base of Baringer Hill, early 20th century.

=== Clark ===
==== Jeffersonville parks and recreation ====
- Bob Hedge Park
- Colston Park
- Connie Seller Park
- Highland Park
- John Wilcoxson Park
- Lansden Park
- Lottie Oglesby Park
- Meijer Little League Fields
- Oak Park
- Optimist Park
- Port Fulton Park
- Shannon Memorial Park
- Shirley Hall Park
- Vissing Park
- Warder Park
- Wathen Park

==== Clarksville parks and recreation ====
- Ashland Park
- Beechwood Park
- Cedar Park
- Colgate Park
- Gaskell Park
- Lapping Park
- Little League Park
- Midway Park
- Moser Park
- Parkwood Park
- Ray Lawrence Park

==== Others and state parks ====
- Perrin Park — Privately owned; located in Jeffersonville
- Charlestown State Park
- Clark State Forest
- Falls of the Ohio State Park

=== Harrison ===
- Buffalo Trace Park
- Harrison-Crawford State Forest
- Hayswood Nature Reserve

== See also ==
- City of Parks
- Cityscape of Louisville, Kentucky
- Geography of Louisville, Kentucky
- List of attractions and events in the Louisville metropolitan area
- Louisville neighborhoods
- Louisville Zoo
