= List of cities in Kentucky =

Map of the United States with Kentucky highlighted

Kentucky, a state in the United States, has 409 active cities.

Kentucky cities are divided into two classes, which define their form of local government: first class and home rule. First class cities are permitted to operate only under the mayor-council, while home rule cities may operate under the mayor-council, city commission, and city manager forms. Currently, Louisville is Kentucky's only designated "first class" city. However, by virtue of also having merged city-county governments, both Louisville and Lexington are treated as special cases under state law, and were permitted to retain their existing local forms of government and powers.

== Classes ==
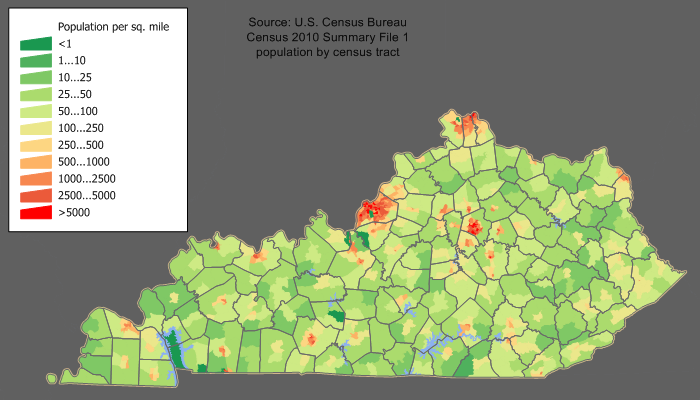
Kentucky population density by census tract (2010), showing the concentration of settlement around Jefferson, Fayette and Kenton counties

The two-class system went into effect on January 1, 2015, following the 2014 passage of House Bill 331 by the Kentucky General Assembly and the bill's signing into law by Governor Steve Beshear.

The new system replaced one in which cities were divided into six classes based on their population at the time of their classification. Before the enactment of House Bill 331, more than 400 classification-related laws affected public safety, alcohol beverage control, revenue options and others. Lexington and Fayette County are completely merged in a unitary urban county government (UCG); Louisville and other cities within Jefferson County have also merged into a single metro government. However, under state law, both major cities retained their pre-merger classification before the new scheme took effect. The General Assembly had historically reclassified cities only when requested by the city government. If all cities had been reclassified in the pre-2015 scheme according to actual population, about one-third of classifications would have changed. In particular, Lexington would have been classified as a first-class (Class 1) city.

Although basic city classification changed in 2015, the old classifications will remain relevant for some time. Because many provisions of state law applied only to cities of certain pre-2015 classes, House Bill 331 was explicitly written to address such issues. In certain areas of law, class-based distinctions between cities have been replaced by population-based distinctions. In certain other areas that were more controversial, the pre-2015 status quo is being maintained through a registry of cities that were covered by prior laws.

Under the reformed system, Louisville is classified as first class. All other cities in the state are in the home rule class.

Pre-2015 classifications

Class	Population (when class was determined)	Number of cities in class	Hypothetical number if reclassified by 2010 population
1	100,000 or more	1	2
2	20,000 to 99,999	13	16
3	8,000 to 19,999	18	32
4	3,000 to 7,999	112	57
5	1000 to 2,999	114	98
6	999 or less	160	213

Five most populous cities in Kentucky
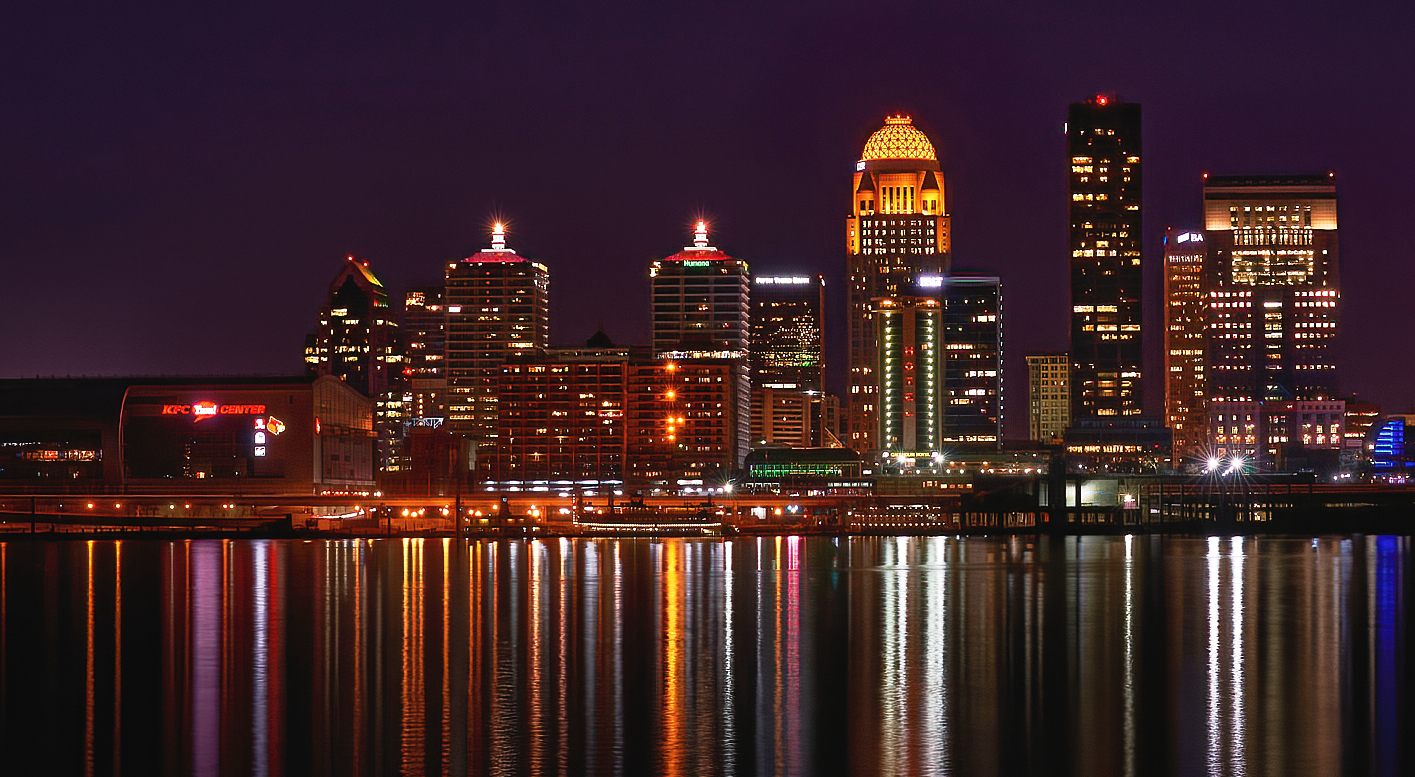
1. Louisville, most populous city in Kentucky

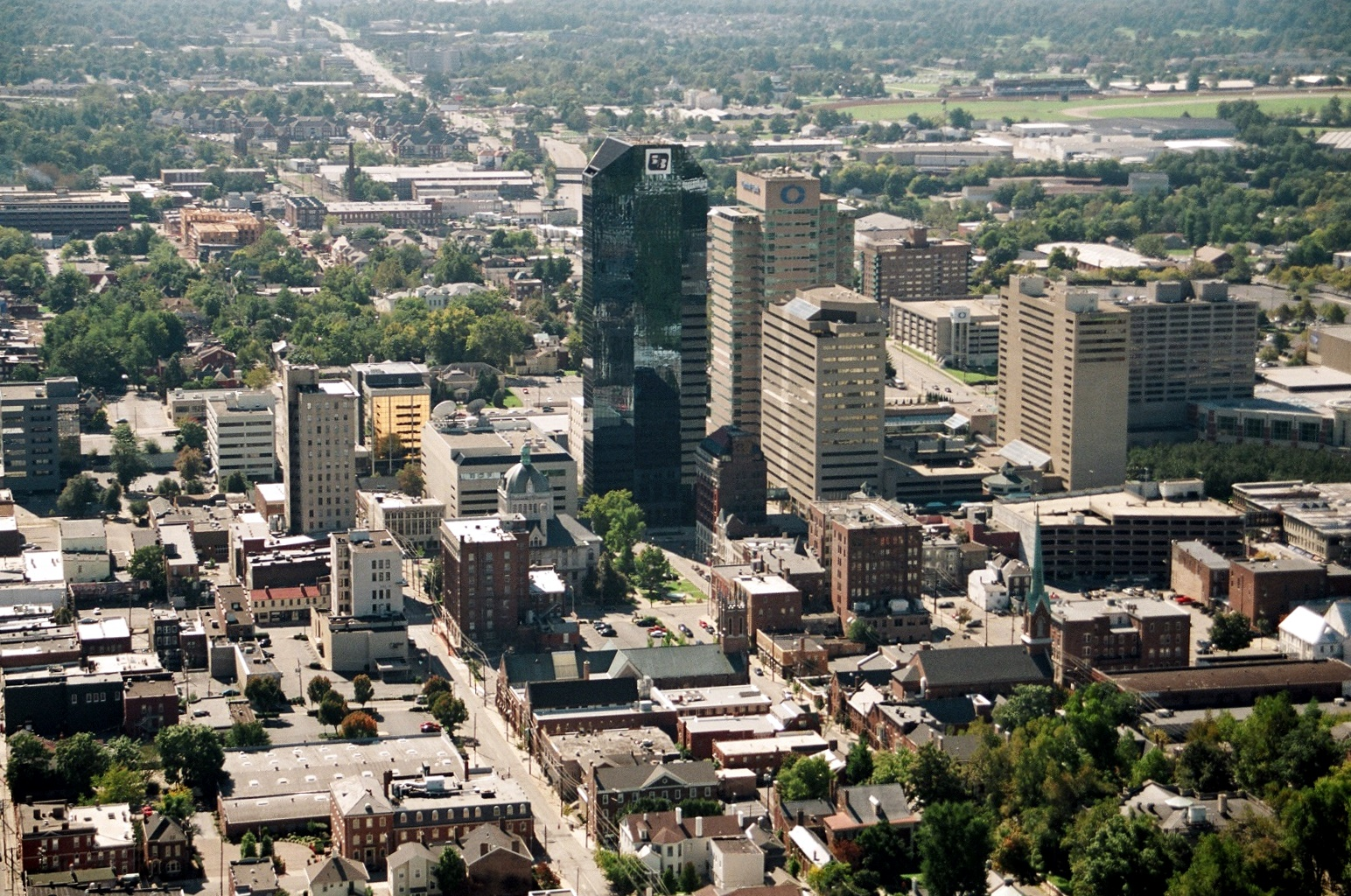
2. Lexington

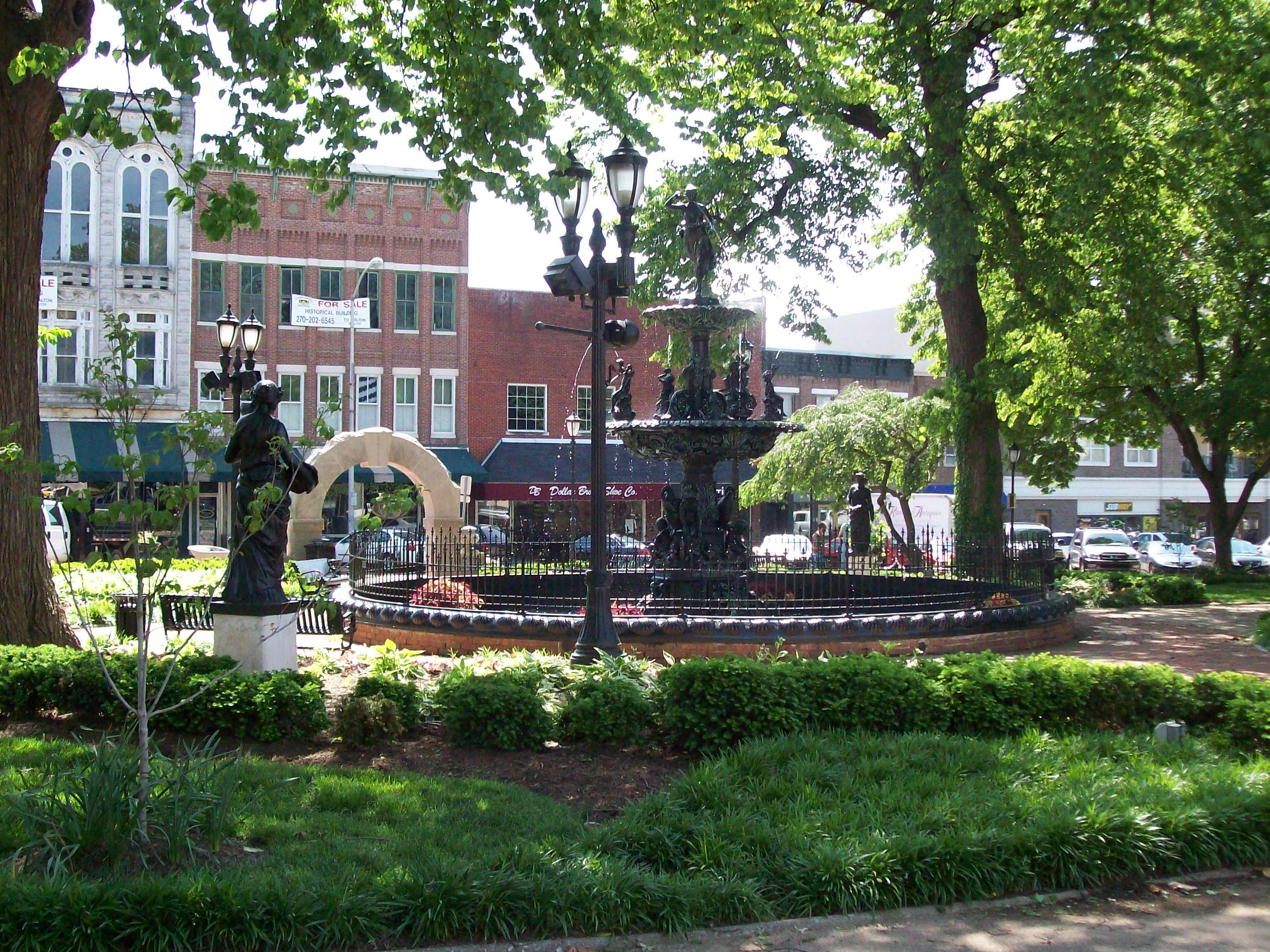
3. Bowling Green

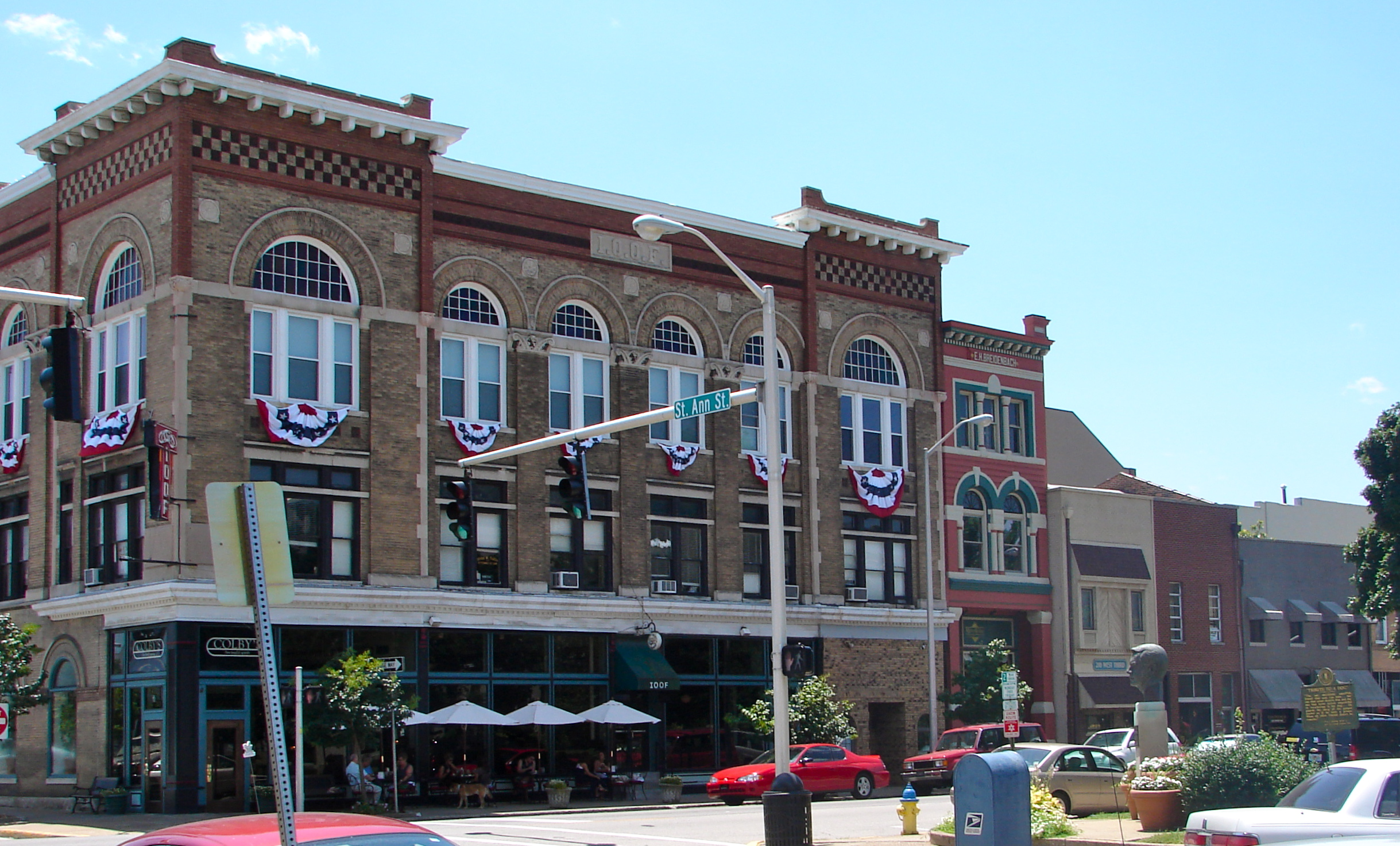
4. Owensboro

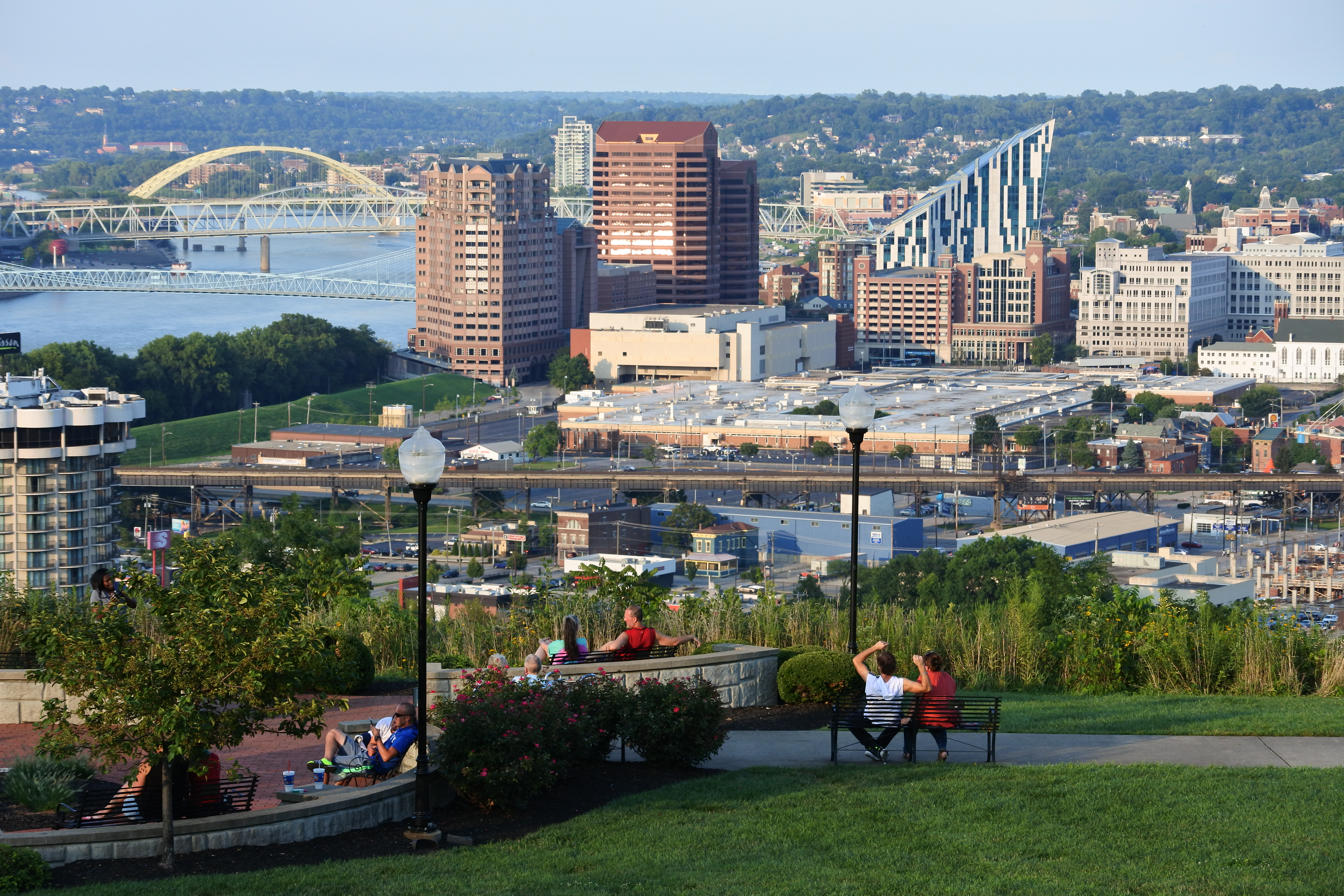
5. Covington

== Current cities ==
Click on the double triangles at the top of a column to sort the table by that column. County seat^{[A]}

Name	Population (2020)	Population (2010)^{[B]}	Change	Current Class	Pre-2015 Class	Area^{[B]}	Incorporated^{[C]}	County^{[D]}
Adairville	837	852	-1.8%	Home Rule	5	1.1 sq mi (2.8 km^{2})	1871	Logan
Albany	1,760	2,033	-13.4%	Home Rule	4	2.3 sq mi (6.0 km^{2})	1838	Clinton
Alexandria	10,341	8,477	22%	Home Rule	4	7.0 sq mi (18.1 km^{2})	1856	Campbell
Allen	182	193	-5.7%	Home Rule	6	0.2 sq mi (0.5 km^{2})	1913	Floyd
Anchorage	2,500	2,348	6.5%	Home Rule	4	3.0 sq mi (7.8 km^{2})	1878	Jefferson
Arlington	264	324	-18.5%	Home Rule	6	0.4 sq mi (1.0 km^{2})	1876	Carlisle
Ashland	21,625	21,684	-0.3%	Home Rule	2	10.8 sq mi (28.0 km^{2})	1856	Boyd
Auburn	1,589	1,340	18.6%	Home Rule	5	1.6 sq mi (4.1 km^{2})	1878	Logan
Audubon Park	1,433	1,473	-2.7%	Home Rule	5	0.3 sq mi (0.8 km^{2})	1941	Jefferson
Augusta	1,096	1,190	-7.9%	Home Rule	4	1.6 sq mi (4.1 km^{2})	1850	Bracken
Bancroft	503	494	1.8%	Home Rule	6	0.2 sq mi (0.5 km^{2})	1970	Jefferson
Barbourmeade	1,216	1,218	-0.2%	Home Rule	5	0.4 sq mi (1.0 km^{2})	1962	Jefferson
Barbourville	3,222	3,165	1.8%	Home Rule	4	2.7 sq mi (7.0 km^{2})	1856	Knox
Bardstown	13,567	11,700	16%	Home Rule	4	10.6 sq mi (27.5 km^{2})	1838	Nelson
Bardwell	714	723	-1.2%	Home Rule	5	0.9 sq mi (2.3 km^{2})	1878	Carlisle
Barlow	653	675	-3.3%	Home Rule	6	0.6 sq mi (1.6 km^{2})	1903	Ballard
Beattyville	2,176	1,307	66.5%	Home Rule	5	2.1 sq mi (5.4 km^{2})	1872	Lee
Beaver Dam	3,531	3,409	3.6%	Home Rule	4	2.6 sq mi (6.7 km^{2})	1873	Ohio
Bedford	526	599	-12.2%	Home Rule	6	0.3 sq mi (0.8 km^{2})	1946	Trimble
Beechwood	1,280	1,324	-3.3%	Home Rule	5	0.3 sq mi (0.8 km^{2})	1950	Jefferson
Bellefonte	920	888	3.6%	Home Rule	6	0.9 sq mi (2.3 km^{2})	1951	Greenup
Bellemeade	909	865	5.1%	Home Rule	6	0.3 sq mi (0.8 km^{2})	1956	Jefferson
Bellevue	5,548	5,955	-6.8%	Home Rule	4	0.9 sq mi (2.3 km^{2})	1870	Campbell
Bellewood	340	321	5.9%	Home Rule	6	0.1 sq mi (0.3 km^{2})	1950	Jefferson
Benham	512	500	2.4%	Home Rule	5	0.2 sq mi (0.5 km^{2})	1961	Harlan
Benton	4,756	4,349	9.4%	Home Rule	4	4.2 sq mi (10.9 km^{2})	1845	Marshall
Berea	15,539	13,561	14.6%	Home Rule	3	16.1 sq mi (41.7 km^{2})	1890	Madison
Berry	250	264	-5.3%	Home Rule	6	0.3 sq mi (0.8 km^{2})	1867	Harrison
Bloomfield	961	838	14.7%	Home Rule	5	1.3 sq mi (3.4 km^{2})	1819	Nelson
Blue Ridge Manor	791	767	3.1%	Home Rule	6	0.2 sq mi (0.5 km^{2})	1964	Jefferson
Booneville	168	81	24.4%	Home Rule	6	0.6 sq mi (1.6 km^{2})	1847	Owsley
Bowling Green	72,294	58,067	24.5%	Home Rule	2	38.1 sq mi (98.7 km^{2})	1812	Warren
Bradfordsville	270	294	-8.2%	Home Rule	6	0.3 sq mi (0.8 km^{2})	1860	Marion
Brandenburg	2,894	2,643	9.5%	Home Rule	5	3.9 sq mi (10.1 km^{2})	1872	Meade
Bremen	172	197	-12.7%	Home Rule	6	0.2 sq mi (0.5 km^{2})	1869	Muhlenberg
Briarwood	445	435	2.3%	Home Rule	6	0.1 sq mi (0.3 km^{2})	1957	Jefferson
Brodhead	1,117	1,211	-7.8%	Home Rule	5	1.8 sq mi (4.7 km^{2})	1880	Rockcastle
Broeck Pointe	245	272	-9.9%	Home Rule	6	0.1 sq mi (0.3 km^{2})	1980	Jefferson
Bromley	724	763	-5.1%	Home Rule	5	0.4 sq mi (1.0 km^{2})	1890	Kenton
Brooksville	654	642	1.9%	Home Rule	5	0.5 sq mi (1.3 km^{2})	1839	Bracken
Brownsboro Farm	640	648	-1.2%	Home Rule	6	0.2 sq mi (0.5 km^{2})	1966	Jefferson
Brownsboro Village	308	319	-3.4%	Home Rule	6	0.1 sq mi (0.3 km^{2})	1954	Jefferson
Brownsville	875	836	4.7%	Home Rule	5	2.6 sq mi (6.7 km^{2})	1880	Edmonson
Buckhorn	89	162	-45.1%	Home Rule	6	0.4 sq mi (1.0 km^{2})	1996	Perry
Burgin	979	965	1.5%	Home Rule	5	1.3 sq mi (3.4 km^{2})	1878	Mercer
Burkesville	1,388	1,521	-8.7%	Home Rule	5	2.6 sq mi (6.7 km^{2})	1846	Cumberland
Burnside	694	611	13.6%	Home Rule	4	8.2 sq mi (21.2 km^{2})	1890	Pulaski
Butler	646	612	5.6%	Home Rule	5	0.2 sq mi (0.5 km^{2})	1868	Pendleton
Cadiz	2,540	2,558	-0.7%	Home Rule	4	2.9 sq mi (7.5 km^{2})	1822	Trigg
Calhoun	725	763	-5%	Home Rule	5	0.7 sq mi (1.8 km^{2})	1852	McLean
California	83	90	-7.8%	Home Rule	6	0.3 sq mi (0.8 km^{2})	1874	Campbell
Calvert City	2,514	2,566	-2%	Home Rule	4	16.7 sq mi (43.3 km^{2})	1951	Marshall
Camargo	1,020	1,081	-5.6%	Home Rule	5	2.2 sq mi (5.7 km^{2})	1969	Montgomery
Cambridge	162	175	-7.4%	Home Rule	6	0.1 sq mi (0.3 km^{2})	1953	Jefferson
Campbellsburg	836	813	2.8%	Home Rule	5	1.6 sq mi (4.1 km^{2})	1937	Henry
Campbellsville	11,426	9,108	25.5%	Home Rule	3	5.1 sq mi (13.2 km^{2})	1851	Taylor
Campton	316	441	-28.3%	Home Rule	6	1.0 sq mi (2.6 km^{2})	1870	Wolfe
Caneyville	529	608	-13%	Home Rule	6	1.6 sq mi (4.1 km^{2})	1880	Grayson
Carlisle	2,093	2,010	4.1%	Home Rule	4	1.3 sq mi (3.4 km^{2})	1880	Nicholas
Carrollton	3,890	3,938	-1.2%	Home Rule	4	2.0 sq mi (5.2 km^{2})	1838	Carroll
Carrsville	48	50	-4%	Home Rule	6	0.1 sq mi (0.3 km^{2})	1979	Livingston
Catlettsburg	1,780	1,856	-4.1%	Home Rule	4	1.6 sq mi (4.1 km^{2})	1858	Boyd
Cave City	2,356	2,240	5.2%	Home Rule	4	4.4 sq mi (11.4 km^{2})	1866	Barren
Centertown	416	423	-1.7%	Home Rule	6	0.3 sq mi (0.8 km^{2})	1890	Ohio
Central City	5,819	5,978	-2.7%	Home Rule	4	5.2 sq mi (13.5 km^{2})	1882	Muhlenberg
Clarkson	933	875	6.6%	Home Rule	6	1.1 sq mi (2.8 km^{2})	1908	Grayson
Clay	1,031	1,181	-12.7%	Home Rule	5	0.9 sq mi (2.3 km^{2})	1860	Webster
Clay City	1,193	1,077	10.8%	Home Rule	5	0.9 sq mi (2.3 km^{2})	1890	Powell
Clinton	1,222	1,388	-12%	Home Rule	5	1.6 sq mi (4.1 km^{2})	1831	Hickman
Cloverport	1,119	1,152	-2.9%	Home Rule	5	1.5 sq mi (3.9 km^{2})	1860	Breckinridge
Coal Run Village	1,669	1,706	-2.2%	Home Rule	6	8.6 sq mi (22.3 km^{2})	1963	Pike
Cold Spring	6,219	5,912	5.1%	Home Rule	5	4.7 sq mi (12.2 km^{2})	1941	Campbell
Coldstream	1,295	1,100	17.7%	Home Rule	6	0.2 sq mi (0.5 km^{2})	1983	Jefferson
Columbia	4,845	4,452	8.8%	Home Rule	4	4.9 sq mi (12.7 km^{2})	1893	Adair
Columbus	140	170	-17.6%	Home Rule	5	0.3 sq mi (0.8 km^{2})	1860	Hickman
Concord	19	35	-45.7%	Home Rule	6	0.1 sq mi (0.3 km^{2})	1833	Lewis
Corbin	7,856	7,304	7.6%	Home Rule	4	7.9 sq mi (20.5 km^{2})	1902	Whitley; Knox; Laurel
Corinth	226	232	-2.6%	Home Rule	6	2.1 sq mi (5.4 km^{2})	1878	Grant
Corydon	737	720	2.4%	Home Rule	5	0.5 sq mi (1.3 km^{2})	1868	Henderson
Covington	40,961	40,640	0.8%	Home Rule	2	13.8 sq mi (35.7 km^{2})	1834	Kenton
Crab Orchard	744	841	-11.5%	Home Rule	6	1.8 sq mi (4.7 km^{2})	1849	Lincoln
Creekside	305	305	0%	Home Rule	6	0.1 sq mi (0.3 km^{2})	1977	Jefferson
Crescent Springs	4,319	3,801	13.6%	Home Rule	4	1.5 sq mi (3.9 km^{2})	1957	Kenton
Crestview	452	475	-4.8%	Home Rule	6	0.2 sq mi (0.5 km^{2})	1950	Campbell
Crestview Hills	3,246	3,148	3.1%	Home Rule	4	1.9 sq mi (4.9 km^{2})	1951	Kenton
Crestwood	6,183	4,531	36.5%	Home Rule	5	4.1 sq mi (10.6 km^{2})	1970	Oldham
Crittenden	4,023	3,815	5.5%	Home Rule	5	3.4 sq mi (8.8 km^{2})	1839	Grant
Crofton	653	749	-12.8%	Home Rule	5	0.6 sq mi (1.6 km^{2})	1873	Christian
Crossgate	221	225	-1.8%	Home Rule	6	0.1 sq mi (0.3 km^{2})	1968	Jefferson
Cumberland	1,947	2,237	-13%	Home Rule	4	3.1 sq mi (8.0 km^{2})	1917	Harlan
Cynthiana	6,333	6,402	-1.1%	Home Rule	4	4.1 sq mi (10.6 km^{2})	1860	Harrison
Danville	17,234	16,218	6.3%	Home Rule	3	15.9 sq mi (41.2 km^{2})	1836	Boyle
Dawson Springs	2,452	2,764	-11.3%	Home Rule	4	3.8 sq mi (9.8 km^{2})	1832	Hopkins; Caldwell
Dayton	5,666	5,338	6.1%	Home Rule	4	1.9 sq mi (4.9 km^{2})	1867	Campbell
Dixon	933	786	18.7%	Home Rule	6	1.0 sq mi (2.6 km^{2})	1861	Webster
Douglass Hills	5,456	5,484	-0.5%	Home Rule	4	1.3 sq mi (3.4 km^{2})	1973	Jefferson
Dover	221	252	-12.3%	Home Rule	6	0.5 sq mi (1.3 km^{2})	1856	Mason
Drakesboro	481	515	-6.6%	Home Rule	5	0.6 sq mi (1.6 km^{2})	1888	Muhlenberg
Druid Hills	299	308	-2.9%	Home Rule	6	0.1 sq mi (0.3 km^{2})	1950	Jefferson
Dry Ridge	2,102	2,191	-4.1%	Home Rule	5	4.6 sq mi (11.9 km^{2})	1920	Grant
Earlington	1,257	1,413	-11%	Home Rule	4	2.5 sq mi (6.5 km^{2})	1871	Hopkins
Eddyville	2,375	2,554	-7%	Home Rule	4	7.8 sq mi (20.2 km^{2})	1812	Lyon
Edgewood	8,435	8,575	-1.6%	Home Rule	4	4.2 sq mi (10.9 km^{2})	1948	Kenton
Edmonton	1,671	1,595	4.8%	Home Rule	5	3.4 sq mi (8.8 km^{2})	1860	Metcalfe
Ekron	175	135	29.6%	Home Rule	6	0.1 sq mi (0.3 km^{2})	1906	Meade
Elizabethtown	31,394	28,531	10%	Home Rule	2	25.8 sq mi (66.8 km^{2})	1847	Hardin
Elkhorn City	1,035	982	5.4%	Home Rule	4	2.6 sq mi (6.7 km^{2})	1912	Pike
Elkton	2,056	2,062	-0.3%	Home Rule	4	2.1 sq mi (5.4 km^{2})	1843	Todd
Elsmere	9,159	8,451	8.4%	Home Rule	4	2.6 sq mi (6.7 km^{2})	1896	Kenton
Eminence	2,705	2,498	8.3%	Home Rule	4	2.9 sq mi (7.5 km^{2})	1851	Henry
Erlanger	19,611	18,082	8.5%	Home Rule	3	8.5 sq mi (22.0 km^{2})	1897	Kenton
Eubank	313	319	-1.9%	Home Rule	6	0.9 sq mi (2.3 km^{2})	1886	Pulaski; Lincoln
Evarts	859	962	-10.7%	Home Rule	5	0.5 sq mi (1.3 km^{2})	1921	Harlan
Ewing	228	264	-13.6%	Home Rule	6	0.3 sq mi (0.8 km^{2})	1979	Fleming
Fairfield	118	113	4.4%	Home Rule	6	0.3 sq mi (0.8 km^{2})	1870	Nelson
Fairview	144	143	0.7%	Home Rule	6	0.7 sq mi (1.8 km^{2})	1957	Kenton
Falmouth	2,216	2,169	2.2%	Home Rule	4	1.1 sq mi (2.8 km^{2})	1856	Pendleton
Ferguson	886	924	-4.1%	Home Rule	5	1.8 sq mi (4.7 km^{2})	1906	Pulaski
Fincastle	848	817	3.8%	Home Rule	6	0.2 sq mi (0.5 km^{2})	1974	Jefferson
Flatwoods	7,325	7,423	-1.3%	Home Rule	3	3.3 sq mi (8.5 km^{2})	1932	Greenup
Fleming-Neon	548	770	-28.8%	Home Rule	5	1.6 sq mi (4.1 km^{2})	1977	Letcher
Flemingsburg	2,953	2,658	11.1%	Home Rule	4	2.0 sq mi (5.2 km^{2})	1812	Fleming
Florence	31,946	29,951	6.7%	Home Rule	3	10.4 sq mi (26.9 km^{2})	1860	Boone
Fordsville	446	524	-14.9%	Home Rule	6	0.5 sq mi (1.3 km^{2})	1886	Ohio
Forest Hills	438	444	-1.4%	Home Rule	6	0.3 sq mi (0.8 km^{2})	1959	Jefferson
Fort Mitchell	8,702	8,207	6%	Home Rule	4	3.2 sq mi (8.3 km^{2})	1910	Kenton
Fort Thomas	17,438	16,325	6.8%	Home Rule	3	5.7 sq mi (14.8 km^{2})	1914	Campbell
Fort Wright	5,851	5,723	2.2%	Home Rule	4	3.4 sq mi (8.8 km^{2})	1941	Kenton
Fountain Run	216	217	-0.5%	Home Rule	6	1.3 sq mi (3.4 km^{2})	1908	Monroe
Fox Chase	436	447	-2.5%	Home Rule	6	0.4 sq mi (1.0 km^{2})	1983	Bullitt
Frankfort	28,602	25,527	12%	Home Rule	2	14.6 sq mi (37.8 km^{2})	1835	Franklin
Franklin	10,176	8,408	21%	Home Rule	3	11.1 sq mi (28.7 km^{2})	1820	Simpson
Fredonia	372	401	-7.2%	Home Rule	5	0.6 sq mi (1.6 km^{2})	1869	Caldwell
Frenchburg	601	486	23.7%	Home Rule	6	0.8 sq mi (2.1 km^{2})	1871	Menifee
Fulton	2,357	2,445	-3.6%	Home Rule	4	3.0 sq mi (7.8 km^{2})	1872	Fulton
Gamaliel	391	376	4%	Home Rule	6	0.6 sq mi (1.6 km^{2})	1956	Monroe
Georgetown	37,086	29,098	27.5%	Home Rule	4	16.0 sq mi (41.4 km^{2})	1784	Scott
Germantown	146	154	-5.2%	Home Rule	6	0.1 sq mi (0.3 km^{2})	1795	Bracken; Mason
Ghent	363	323	12.4%	Home Rule	6	0.7 sq mi (1.8 km^{2})	1856	Carroll
Glasgow	15,014	14,028	7%	Home Rule	3	15.5 sq mi (40.1 km^{2})	1809	Barren
Glencoe	350	360	-2.8%	Home Rule	6	1.8 sq mi (4.7 km^{2})	1960	Gallatin
Glenview	596	531	12.2%	Home Rule	6	1.4 sq mi (3.6 km^{2})	1985	Jefferson
Glenview Hills	377	319	18.2%	Home Rule	6	0.1 sq mi (0.3 km^{2})	1972	Jefferson
Glenview Manor	206	191	7.9%	Home Rule	6	0.1 sq mi (0.3 km^{2})	1965	Jefferson
Goose Creek	303	294	3.1%	Home Rule	6	0.1 sq mi (0.3 km^{2})	1969	Jefferson
Goshen	892	909	-1.9%	Home Rule	5	0.2 sq mi (0.5 km^{2})	1990	Oldham
Grand Rivers	345	382	-9.7%	Home Rule	5	2.0 sq mi (5.2 km^{2})	1890	Livingston
Gratz	67	78	-14.1%	Home Rule	6	0.4 sq mi (1.0 km^{2})	1881	Owen
Graymoor-Devondale	2,853	2,870	-0.6%	Home Rule	4	0.8 sq mi (2.1 km^{2})	1987	Jefferson
Grayson	3,834	4,217	-9.1%	Home Rule	4	2.9 sq mi (7.5 km^{2})	1860	Carter
Green Spring	711	715	-0.6%	Home Rule	6	0.3 sq mi (0.8 km^{2})	1974	Jefferson
Greensburg	2,179	2,163	0.7%	Home Rule	4	2.1 sq mi (5.4 km^{2})	1795	Green
Greenup	1,095	1,188	-7.8%	Home Rule	5	1.2 sq mi (3.1 km^{2})	1848	Greenup
Greenville	4,492	4,312	4.2%	Home Rule	4	4.7 sq mi (12.2 km^{2})	1849	Muhlenberg
Guthrie	1,330	1,419	-6.3%	Home Rule	4	1.7 sq mi (4.4 km^{2})	1876	Todd
Hanson	758	742	2.2%	Home Rule	6	2.6 sq mi (6.7 km^{2})	1873	Hopkins
Hardin	580	615	-5.7%	Home Rule	5	0.7 sq mi (1.8 km^{2})	1952	Marshall
Hardinsburg	2,385	2,343	1.8%	Home Rule	5	3.5 sq mi (9.1 km^{2})	1890	Breckinridge
Harlan	1,776	1,745	1.8%	Home Rule	4	1.3 sq mi (3.4 km^{2})	1884	Harlan
Harrodsburg	9,064	8,340	8.7%	Home Rule	3	6.9 sq mi (17.9 km^{2})	1836	Mercer
Hartford	2,668	2,672	-0.1%	Home Rule	5	2.7 sq mi (7.0 km^{2})	1808	Ohio
Hawesville	1,023	945	8.3%	Home Rule	5	1.3 sq mi (3.4 km^{2})	1847	Hancock
Hazard	5,263	4,456	18.1%	Home Rule	4	5.3 sq mi (13.7 km^{2})	1884	Perry
Hazel	390	410	-4.9%	Home Rule	6	0.4 sq mi (1.0 km^{2})	1911	Calloway
Hebron Estates	1,014	1,087	-6.7%	Home Rule	5	0.6 sq mi (1.6 km^{2})	1984	Bullitt
Henderson	27,981	28,757	-2.7%	Home Rule	2	17.6 sq mi (45.6 km^{2})	1840	Henderson
Heritage Creek	1,209	1,076	12.4%	Home Rule	5	0.4 sq mi (1.0 km^{2})	1960	Jefferson
Hickman	2,365	2,395	-1.3%	Home Rule	4	3.6 sq mi (9.3 km^{2})	1841	Fulton
Hickory Hill	119	114	4.4%	Home Rule	6	0.1 sq mi (0.3 km^{2})	1979	Jefferson
Highland Heights	6,662	6,923	-3.8%	Home Rule	4	2.6 sq mi (6.7 km^{2})	1927	Campbell
Hills and Dales	146	142	2.8%	Home Rule	6	0.1 sq mi (0.3 km^{2})	1976	Jefferson
Hillview	8,622	8,172	5.5%	Home Rule	3	3.3 sq mi (8.5 km^{2})	1974	Bullitt
Hindman	701	777	-9.8%	Home Rule	5	3.1 sq mi (8.0 km^{2})	1886	Knott
Hodgenville	3,235	3,206	0.9%	Home Rule	4	2.1 sq mi (5.4 km^{2})	1839	LaRue
Hollow Creek	799	783	2%	Home Rule	5	0.2 sq mi (0.5 km^{2})	1971	Jefferson
Hollyvilla	518	537	-3.5%	Home Rule	6	0.3 sq mi (0.8 km^{2})	1958	Jefferson
Hopkinsville	31,180	31,577	-1.3%	Home Rule	2	30.8 sq mi (79.8 km^{2})	1853	Christian
Horse Cave	2,212	2,311	-4.3%	Home Rule	4	2.7 sq mi (7.0 km^{2})	1864	Hart
Houston Acres	492	507	-3%	Home Rule	6	0.1 sq mi (0.3 km^{2})	1956	Jefferson
Hunters Hollow	324	386	-16.1%	Home Rule	6	0.1 sq mi (0.3 km^{2})	1979	Bullitt
Hurstbourne	4,683	4,216	11.1%	Home Rule	4	1.8 sq mi (4.7 km^{2})	1982	Jefferson
Hurstbourne Acres	1,957	1,811	8.1%	Home Rule	5	0.3 sq mi (0.8 km^{2})	1963	Jefferson
Hustonville	387	405	-4.4%	Home Rule	5	1.0 sq mi (2.6 km^{2})	1850	Lincoln
Hyden	303	365	-17%	Home Rule	6	1.3 sq mi (3.4 km^{2})	1882	Leslie
Independence	28,676	24,757	15.8%	Home Rule	2	17.7 sq mi (45.8 km^{2})	1842	Kenton
Indian Hills	2,860	2,868	-0.3%	Home Rule	4	2.0 sq mi (5.2 km^{2})	1999	Jefferson
Inez	546	717	-23.8%	Home Rule	6	1.7 sq mi (4.4 km^{2})	1942	Martin
Irvine	2,360	2,715	-13.1%	Home Rule	4	1.5 sq mi (3.9 km^{2})	1849	Estill
Irvington	1,231	1,181	4.2%	Home Rule	5	0.9 sq mi (2.3 km^{2})	1889	Breckinridge
Island	429	458	-6.3%	Home Rule	6	0.3 sq mi (0.8 km^{2})	1908	McLean
Jackson	2,237	2,231	0.3%	Home Rule	4	2.7 sq mi (7.0 km^{2})	1890	Breathitt
Jamestown	1,867	1,794	4.1%	Home Rule	5	3.0 sq mi (7.8 km^{2})	1826	Russell
Jeffersontown	28,474	26,595	7.1%	Home Rule	2	10.0 sq mi (25.9 km^{2})	1797	Jefferson
Jeffersonville	1,708	1,506	13.4%	Home Rule	5	2.5 sq mi (6.5 km^{2})	1876	Montgomery
Jenkins	1,902	2,203	-13.7%	Home Rule	4	7.7 sq mi (19.9 km^{2})	1912	Letcher
Junction City	2,268	2,241	1.2%	Home Rule	4	1.8 sq mi (4.7 km^{2})	1882	Boyle
Keene	99	115	-13.9%	Home Rule	6		1844	Jessamine
Kenton Vale	105	110	-4.5%	Home Rule	6	0.1 sq mi (0.3 km^{2})	1949	Kenton
Kevil	595	376	58.2%	Home Rule	6	0.4 sq mi (1.0 km^{2})	1910	Ballard
Kingsley	397	381	4.2%	Home Rule	6	0.1 sq mi (0.3 km^{2})	1939	Jefferson
Kuttawa	629	649	-3.1%	Home Rule	5	2.7 sq mi (7.0 km^{2})	1872	Lyon
LaCenter	872	1,009	-13.6%	Home Rule	5	0.6 sq mi (1.6 km^{2})	?	Ballard
LaFayette	177	165	7.3%	Home Rule	6	0.2 sq mi (0.5 km^{2})	1836	Christian
La Grange	10,067	8,082	24.6%	Home Rule	4	7.1 sq mi (18.4 km^{2})	1840	Oldham
Lakeside Park	2,841	2,668	6.5%	Home Rule	5	0.8 sq mi (2.1 km^{2})	1930	Kenton
Lakeview Heights	277	185	49.7%	Home Rule	6	0.1 sq mi (0.3 km^{2})	1979	Rowan
Lancaster	3,899	3,442	13.3%	Home Rule	4	1.9 sq mi (4.9 km^{2})	1837	Garrard
Langdon Place	870	936	-7.1%	Home Rule	6	0.2 sq mi (0.5 km^{2})	1977	Jefferson
Lawrenceburg	11,728	10,505	11.6%	Home Rule	3	5.9 sq mi (15.3 km^{2})	1850	Anderson
Lebanon	6,274	5,539	13.3%	Home Rule	4	5.3 sq mi (13.7 km^{2})	1815	Marion
Lebanon Junction	1,746	1,813	-3.7%	Home Rule	5	5.7 sq mi (14.8 km^{2})	1895	Bullitt
Leitchfield	6,404	6,699	-4.4%	Home Rule	4	10.9 sq mi (28.2 km^{2})	1866	Grayson
Lewisburg	748	810	-7.7%	Home Rule	5	1.2 sq mi (3.1 km^{2})	1878	Logan
Lewisport	1,767	1,670	5.8%	Home Rule	5	1.0 sq mi (2.6 km^{2})	1882	Hancock
Lexington	322,570	295,803	9%	Home Rule	2	285.6 sq mi (739.7 km^{2})	1831	Fayette
Liberty	2,028	2,168	-6.5%	Home Rule	5	1.9 sq mi (4.9 km^{2})	1860	Casey
Lincolnshire	137	148	-7.4%	Home Rule	6	0.1 sq mi (0.3 km^{2})	1953	Jefferson
Livermore	1,230	1,365	-9.9%	Home Rule	5	1.0 sq mi (2.6 km^{2})	1850	McLean
Livingston	166	226	-26.5%	Home Rule	6	0.3 sq mi (0.8 km^{2})	1943	Rockcastle
London	7,572	7,993	-5.3%	Home Rule	4	10.3 sq mi (26.7 km^{2})	1836	Laurel
Loretto	723	713	1.4%	Home Rule	6	3.2 sq mi (8.3 km^{2})	1866	Marion
Louisa	2,679	2,467	8.6%	Home Rule	5	1.6 sq mi (4.1 km^{2})	1869	Lawrence
Louisville	633,045	597,337	6%	First	1	342.2 sq mi (886.3 km^{2})	1828	Jefferson
Loyall	638	1,461	-4.9%	Home Rule	5	1.4 sq mi (3.6 km^{2})	1924	Harlan
Ludlow	4,385	4,407	-0.5%	Home Rule	4	1.2 sq mi (3.1 km^{2})	1864	Kenton
Lynch	658	747	-11.9%	Home Rule	5	0.3 sq mi (0.8 km^{2})	1963	Harlan
Lyndon	11,008	11,002	0.1%	Home Rule	3	3.6 sq mi (9.3 km^{2})	1965	Jefferson
Lynnview	945	914	3.4%	Home Rule	5	0.2 sq mi (0.5 km^{2})	1954	Jefferson
Mackville	207	222	-6.8%	Home Rule	6	0.4 sq mi (1.0 km^{2})	1967	Washington
Madisonville	19,542	19,591	-0.3%	Home Rule	3	18.7 sq mi (48.4 km^{2})	1807	Hopkins
Manchester	1,512	1,255	20.5%	Home Rule	4	1.5 sq mi (3.9 km^{2})	1844	Clay
Manor Creek	240	140	71.4%	Home Rule	6	0.1 sq mi (0.3 km^{2})	1972	Jefferson
Marion	2,916	3,039	-4%	Home Rule	4	3.4 sq mi (8.8 km^{2})	1851	Crittenden
Martin	513	634	-19.1%	Home Rule	4	0.7 sq mi (1.8 km^{2})	1920	Floyd
Maryhill Estates	185	179	3.4%	Home Rule	6	0.1 sq mi (0.3 km^{2})	1963	Jefferson
Mayfield	10,017	10,024	-0.1%	Home Rule	3	10.4 sq mi (26.9 km^{2})	1846	Graves
Maysville	8,873	9,011	-1.5%	Home Rule	3	21.4 sq mi (55.4 km^{2})	1833	Mason
McHenry	369	388	-4.9%	Home Rule	6	0.7 sq mi (1.8 km^{2})	1880	Ohio
McKee	803	800	0.4%	Home Rule	5	2.3 sq mi (6.0 km^{2})	1882	Jackson
Meadow Vale	730	736	-0.8%	Home Rule	5	0.2 sq mi (0.5 km^{2})	1967	Jefferson
Meadowbrook Farm	117	136	-14%	Home Rule	6	0.1 sq mi (0.3 km^{2})	1975	Jefferson
Meadowview Estates	178	363	-51%	Home Rule	6	0.1 sq mi (0.3 km^{2})	1954	Jefferson
Melbourne	458	401	14.2%	Home Rule	6	0.8 sq mi (2.1 km^{2})	1912	Campbell
Mentor	218	193	13%	Home Rule	6	0.7 sq mi (1.8 km^{2})	1957	Campbell
Middlesboro	9,405	10,334	-9%	Home Rule	3	7.6 sq mi (19.7 km^{2})	1890	Bell
Middletown	9,706	7,218	34.5%	Home Rule	4	5.1 sq mi (13.2 km^{2})	1979	Jefferson
Midway	1,718	1,641	4.7%	Home Rule	4	1.1 sq mi (2.8 km^{2})	1846	Woodford
Millersburg	747	792	-5.7%	Home Rule	5	0.4 sq mi (1.0 km^{2})	1893	Bourbon
Milton	590	574	2.8%	Home Rule	6	1.3 sq mi (3.4 km^{2})	1954	Trimble
Mockingbird Valley	175	167	4.8%	Home Rule	6	0.2 sq mi (0.5 km^{2})	1940	Jefferson
Monticello	5,753	6,188	-7%	Home Rule	4	5.9 sq mi (15.3 km^{2})	1810	Wayne
Moorland	433	431	0.5%	Home Rule	6	0.1 sq mi (0.3 km^{2})	1959	Jefferson
Morehead	7,151	6,845	4.5%	Home Rule	4	9.5 sq mi (24.6 km^{2})	1869	Rowan
Morganfield	3,256	3,285	-0.9%	Home Rule	4	3.0 sq mi (7.8 km^{2})	1870	Union
Morgantown	2,505	2,394	4.6%	Home Rule	5	2.4 sq mi (6.2 km^{2})	1813	Butler
Mortons Gap	728	863	-15.6%	Home Rule	5	1.2 sq mi (3.1 km^{2})	1888	Hopkins
Mount Olivet	347	299	16.1%	Home Rule	5	0.4 sq mi (1.0 km^{2})	1871	Robertson
Mount Sterling	7,558	6,895	9.6%	Home Rule	4	4.4 sq mi (11.4 km^{2})	1851	Montgomery
Mount Vernon	2,453	2,477	-1%	Home Rule	5	1.7 sq mi (4.4 km^{2})	1866	Rockcastle
Mount Washington	18,090	9,117	98.4%	Home Rule	3	6.1 sq mi (15.8 km^{2})	1954	Bullitt
Muldraugh	1,040	947	9.8%	Home Rule	5	0.6 sq mi (1.6 km^{2})	1952	Meade
Munfordville	1,686	1,615	4.4%	Home Rule	5	2.3 sq mi (6.0 km^{2})	1880	Hart
Murray	17,307	17,741	-2.4%	Home Rule	3	11.3 sq mi (29.3 km^{2})	1844	Calloway
Murray Hill	565	582	-2.9%	Home Rule	6	0.1 sq mi (0.3 km^{2})	1982	Jefferson
Nebo	211	236	-10.6%	Home Rule	6	0.3 sq mi (0.8 km^{2})	1861	Hopkins
New Castle	884	912	-3.1%	Home Rule	5	0.4 sq mi (1.0 km^{2})	1851	Henry
New Haven	798	855	-6.7%	Home Rule	6	0.6 sq mi (1.6 km^{2})	1839	Nelson
Newport	14,150	15,273	-7.4%	Home Rule	3	3.0 sq mi (7.8 km^{2})	1834	Campbell
Nicholasville	31,093	28,015	11%	Home Rule	2	13.1 sq mi (33.9 km^{2})	1837	Jessamine
Norbourne Estates	437	441	-0.9%	Home Rule	6	0.1 sq mi (0.3 km^{2})	1950	Jefferson
North Middletown	610	643	-5.1%	Home Rule	5	0.3 sq mi (0.8 km^{2})	1819	Bourbon
Northfield	991	1,020	-2.8%	Home Rule	5	0.5 sq mi (1.3 km^{2})	1965	Jefferson
Nortonville	977	1,204	-18.9%	Home Rule	5	1.1 sq mi (2.8 km^{2})	1873	Hopkins
Norwood	379	370	2.4%	Home Rule	6	0.1 sq mi (0.3 km^{2})	1975	Jefferson
Oak Grove	7,931	7,489	5.9%	Home Rule	4	10.8 sq mi (28.0 km^{2})	1974	Christian
Oakland	198	225	-12%	Home Rule	6	1.4 sq mi (3.6 km^{2})	1977	Warren
Old Brownsboro Place	376	353	6.5%	Home Rule	6	0.1 sq mi (0.3 km^{2})	1977	Jefferson
Olive Hill	1,580	1,599	-1.2%	Home Rule	4	1.8 sq mi (4.7 km^{2})	1884	Carter
Orchard Grass Hills	1,536	1,595	-3.7%	Home Rule	5	0.4 sq mi (1.0 km^{2})	1979	Oldham
Owensboro	60,183	57,265	5.1%	Home Rule	2	20.4 sq mi (52.8 km^{2})	1850	Daviess
Owenton	1,682	1,327	26.8%	Home Rule	5	1.1 sq mi (2.8 km^{2})	1849	Owen
Owingsville	1,593	1,530	4.1%	Home Rule	4	2.4 sq mi (6.2 km^{2})	1811	Bath
Paducah	27,137	25,024	8.4%	Home Rule	2	20.0 sq mi (51.8 km^{2})	1838	McCracken
Paintsville	4,312	3,459	24.7%	Home Rule	4	2.8 sq mi (7.3 km^{2})	1843	Johnson
Paris	10,171	8,553	18.9%	Home Rule	3	6.0 sq mi (15.5 km^{2})	1890	Bourbon
Park City	614	537	14.3%	Home Rule	5	1.5 sq mi (3.9 km^{2})	1871	Barren
Park Hills	3,162	2,970	6.5%	Home Rule	4	0.8 sq mi (2.1 km^{2})	1927	Kenton
Parkway Village	623	650	-4.2%	Home Rule	6	0.1 sq mi (0.3 km^{2})	1940	Jefferson
Pembroke	865	869	-0.5%	Home Rule	6	1.1 sq mi (2.8 km^{2})	1869	Christian
Perryville	782	751	4.1%	Home Rule	5	0.8 sq mi (2.1 km^{2})	1867	Boyle
Pewee Valley	1,588	1,456	9.1%	Home Rule	5	2.0 sq mi (5.2 km^{2})	1870	Oldham
Pikeville	7,754	6,903	12.3%	Home Rule	4	21.1 sq mi (54.6 km^{2})	1848	Pike
Pineville	1,678	1,732	-3.1%	Home Rule	4	1.7 sq mi (4.4 km^{2})	1873	Bell
Pioneer Village	2,671	2,030	31.6%	Home Rule	4	0.7 sq mi (1.8 km^{2})	1974	Bullitt
Pippa Passes	468	533	-12.2%	Home Rule	6	0.5 sq mi (1.3 km^{2})	1983	Knott
Plantation	826	832	-0.7%	Home Rule	5	0.2 sq mi (0.5 km^{2})	1960	Jefferson
Pleasureville	779	834	-6.6%	Home Rule	6	0.5 sq mi (1.3 km^{2})	1842	Henry; Shelby
Plum Springs	497	453	9.7%	Home Rule	6	0.3 sq mi (0.8 km^{2})	1966	Warren
Powderly	788	745	5.8%	Home Rule	5	1.6 sq mi (4.1 km^{2})	1963	Muhlenberg
Prestonsburg	3,681	3,255	13.1%	Home Rule	4	12.9 sq mi (33.4 km^{2})	1867	Floyd
Prestonville	171	161	6.2%	Home Rule	6	0.2 sq mi (0.5 km^{2})	1867	Carroll
Princeton	6,270	6,329	-0.9%	Home Rule	4	9.0 sq mi (23.3 km^{2})	1854	Caldwell
Prospect	4,592	4,698	-2.3%	Home Rule	3	3.9 sq mi (10.1 km^{2})	1974	Jefferson; Oldham
Providence	2,892	3,193	-9.4%	Home Rule	4	6.1 sq mi (15.8 km^{2})	1860	Webster
Raceland	2,343	2,424	-3.3%	Home Rule	5	2.5 sq mi (6.5 km^{2})	1915	Greenup
Radcliff	23,042	21,688	6.2%	Home Rule	2	12.4 sq mi (32.1 km^{2})	1956	Hardin
Ravenna	568	605	-6.1%	Home Rule	5	0.3 sq mi (0.8 km^{2})	1921	Estill
Richlawn	415	405	2.5%	Home Rule	6	0.1 sq mi (0.3 km^{2})	1948	Jefferson
Richmond	34,585	31,364	10.3%	Home Rule	2	23.1 sq mi (59.8 km^{2})	1809	Madison
River Bluff	436	403	8.2%	Home Rule	6	0.2 sq mi (0.5 km^{2})	1980	Oldham
Riverwood	492	446	10.3%	Home Rule	6	0.2 sq mi (0.5 km^{2})	1969	Jefferson
Robards	449	515	-12.8%	Home Rule	6	3.0 sq mi (7.8 km^{2})	1997	Henderson
Rochester	114	152	-25%	Home Rule	6	0.5 sq mi (1.3 km^{2})	1858	Butler
Rockport	262	266	-1.5%	Home Rule	6	0.7 sq mi (1.8 km^{2})	1870	Ohio
Rolling Fields	720	646	11.5%	Home Rule	6	0.2 sq mi (0.5 km^{2})	1958	Jefferson
Rolling Hills	934	959	-2.6%	Home Rule	5	0.2 sq mi (0.5 km^{2})	1966	Jefferson
Russell	3,744	3,380	10.8%	Home Rule	4	3.0 sq mi (7.8 km^{2})	1874	Greenup
Russell Springs	2,715	2,441	11.2%	Home Rule	5	4.5 sq mi (11.7 km^{2})	1936	Russell
Russellville	7,164	6,960	2.9%	Home Rule	4	10.8 sq mi (28.0 km^{2})	1840	Logan
Ryland Heights	922	1,022	-9.8%	Home Rule	6	5.3 sq mi (13.7 km^{2})	1972	Kenton
Sacramento	429	468	-8.3%	Home Rule	6	0.4 sq mi (1.0 km^{2})	1860	McLean
Sadieville	320	303	5.6%	Home Rule	5	1.1 sq mi (2.8 km^{2})	1880	Scott
St. Charles	273	277	-1.4%	Home Rule	6	1.0 sq mi (2.6 km^{2})	1874	Hopkins
St. Matthews	17,534	17,472	0.4%	Home Rule	3	4.3 sq mi (11.1 km^{2})	1950	Jefferson
St. Regis Park	1,438	1,454	-1.1%	Home Rule	4	0.4 sq mi (1.0 km^{2})	1953	Jefferson
Salem	722	752	-4%	Home Rule	6	0.9 sq mi (2.3 km^{2})	1869	Livingston
Salt Lick	247	303	-18.5%	Home Rule	6	0.8 sq mi (2.1 km^{2})	1888	Bath
Salyersville	1,591	1,883	-15.5%	Home Rule	4	2.5 sq mi (6.5 km^{2})	1867	Magoffin
Sanders	197	238	-17.2%	Home Rule	6	0.3 sq mi (0.8 km^{2})	1882	Carroll
Sandy Hook	641	675	-5%	Home Rule	5	1.0 sq mi (2.6 km^{2})	1888	Elliott
Sardis	60	103	-41.7%	Home Rule	6	1.0 sq mi (2.6 km^{2})	1850	Mason; Robertson
Science Hill	657	693	-5.2%	Home Rule	6	0.6 sq mi (1.6 km^{2})	1882	Pulaski
Scottsville	4,299	4,226	1.7%	Home Rule	4	5.7 sq mi (14.8 km^{2})	1860	Allen
Sebree	1,574	1,603	-1.8%	Home Rule	5	2.9 sq mi (7.5 km^{2})	1871	Webster
Seneca Gardens	674	696	-3.2%	Home Rule	6	0.2 sq mi (0.5 km^{2})	1941	Jefferson
Sharpsburg	365	323	13%	Home Rule	6	0.2 sq mi (0.5 km^{2})	1852	Bath
Shelbyville	17,282	14,045	23%	Home Rule	3	8.2 sq mi (21.2 km^{2})	1846	Shelby
Shepherdsville	14,201	11,222	26.5%	Home Rule	3	10.0 sq mi (25.9 km^{2})	1793	Bullitt
Shively	15,636	15,264	2.4%	Home Rule	3	4.6 sq mi (11.9 km^{2})	1938	Jefferson
Silver Grove	1,154	1,102	4.7%	Home Rule	5	1.7 sq mi (4.4 km^{2})	1950	Campbell
Simpsonville	2,990	2,484	20.4%	Home Rule	5	2.2 sq mi (5.7 km^{2})	1833	Shelby
Slaughters	190	216	-12%	Home Rule	6	0.2 sq mi (0.5 km^{2})	1861	Webster
Smithfield	124	106	17%	Home Rule	6	0.1 sq mi (0.3 km^{2})	1870	Henry
Smithland	240	301	-20.3%	Home Rule	6	0.5 sq mi (1.3 km^{2})	1843	Livingston
Smiths Grove	752	714	5.3%	Home Rule	5	0.8 sq mi (2.1 km^{2})	1871	Warren
Somerset	11,924	11,196	6.5%	Home Rule	3	11.3 sq mi (29.3 km^{2})	1883	Pulaski
Sonora	565	513	10.1%	Home Rule	6	1.1 sq mi (2.8 km^{2})	1885	Hardin
South Carrollton	141	184	-23.4%	Home Rule	6	0.3 sq mi (0.8 km^{2})	1849	Muhlenberg
South Shore	1,066	1,122	-5%	Home Rule	5	0.9 sq mi (2.3 km^{2})	1957	Greenup
Southgate	3,648	3,803	-4.1%	Home Rule	4	1.4 sq mi (3.6 km^{2})	1907	Campbell
Sparta	236	231	2.2%	Home Rule	6	5.9 sq mi (15.3 km^{2})	1852	Gallatin; Owen
Spring Mill	294	287	2.4%	Home Rule	6	0.1 sq mi (0.3 km^{2})	1983	Jefferson
Spring Valley	675	654	3.2%	Home Rule	6	0.2 sq mi (0.5 km^{2})	1983	Jefferson
Springfield	2,846	2,519	13%	Home Rule	4	3.7 sq mi (9.6 km^{2})	1847	Washington
Stamping Ground	780	643	21.3%	Home Rule	6	0.4 sq mi (1.0 km^{2})	1853	Scott
Stanford	3,640	3,487	4.4%	Home Rule	4	3.1 sq mi (8.0 km^{2})	1861	Lincoln
Stanton	3,251	2,733	19%	Home Rule	4	2.1 sq mi (5.4 km^{2})	1854	Powell
Strathmoor Manor	351	337	4.2%	Home Rule	6	0.1 sq mi (0.3 km^{2})	1931	Jefferson
Strathmoor Village	684	648	5.6%	Home Rule	6	0.1 sq mi (0.3 km^{2})	1929	Jefferson
Sturgis	1,735	1,898	-8.6%	Home Rule	4	1.6 sq mi (4.1 km^{2})	1890	Union
Sycamore	166	160	3.8%	Home Rule	6	0.1 sq mi (0.3 km^{2})	1979	Jefferson
Taylor Mill	6,873	6,604	4.1%	Home Rule	4	6.3 sq mi (16.3 km^{2})	1956	Kenton
Taylorsville	1,256	763	64.6%	Home Rule	5	0.3 sq mi (0.8 km^{2})	1856	Spencer
Ten Broeck	99	103	-3.9%	Home Rule	6	0.2 sq mi (0.5 km^{2})	1979	Jefferson
Thornhill	185	178	3.9%	Home Rule	6	0.1 sq mi (0.3 km^{2})	1976	Jefferson
Tompkinsville	2,309	2,402	-3.9%	Home Rule	5	3.6 sq mi (9.3 km^{2})	1856	Monroe
Trenton	326	384	-15.1%	Home Rule	6	0.6 sq mi (1.6 km^{2})	1868	Todd
Union	7,416	5,379	37.9%	Home Rule	4	3.3 sq mi (8.5 km^{2})	1962	Boone
Uniontown	929	1,002	-7.3%	Home Rule	5	0.9 sq mi (2.3 km^{2})	1860	Union
Upton	704	683	3.1%	Home Rule	6	1.4 sq mi (3.6 km^{2})	1865	Hardin; LaRue
Vanceburg	1,428	1,518	-5.9%	Home Rule	4	1.3 sq mi (3.4 km^{2})	1827	Lewis
Versailles	10,347	8,568	20.8%	Home Rule	3	4.4 sq mi (11.4 km^{2})	1837	Woodford
Villa Hills	7,310	7,489	-2.4%	Home Rule	4	4.4 sq mi (11.4 km^{2})	1962	Kenton
Vine Grove	6,559	4,520	45.1%	Home Rule	4	4.7 sq mi (12.2 km^{2})	1865	Hardin
Walton	5,460	3,635	50.2%	Home Rule	5	4.3 sq mi (11.1 km^{2})	1854	Boone; Kenton
Warfield	264	269	-1.9%	Home Rule	6	0.8 sq mi (2.1 km^{2})	1982	Martin
Warsaw	1,761	1,615	9%	Home Rule	4	0.7 sq mi (1.8 km^{2})	1833	Gallatin
Watterson Park	1,004	976	2.9%	Home Rule	5	1.4 sq mi (3.6 km^{2})	1981	Jefferson
Waverly	311	308	1%	Home Rule	6	0.3 sq mi (0.8 km^{2})	1869	Union
Wayland	389	426	-8.7%	Home Rule	6	2.6 sq mi (6.7 km^{2})	1914	Floyd
Wellington	564	565	-0.2%	Home Rule	6	0.1 sq mi (0.3 km^{2})	1946	Jefferson
West Buechel	1,370	1,230	11.4%	Home Rule	5	0.6 sq mi (1.6 km^{2})	1951	Jefferson
West Liberty	3,215	3,435	-6.4%	Home Rule	4	4.4 sq mi (11.4 km^{2})	1840	Morgan
West Point	952	797	19.4%	Home Rule	5	0.6 sq mi (1.6 km^{2})	1848	Hardin
Westwood	571	634	-9.9%	Home Rule	6	0.1 sq mi (0.3 km^{2})	1967	Jefferson
Wheatcroft	105	160	-34.4%	Home Rule	6	0.3 sq mi (0.8 km^{2})	1902	Webster
Wheelwright	509	780	-34.7%	Home Rule	6	1.8 sq mi (4.7 km^{2})	1917	Floyd
White Plains	829	884	-6.2%	Home Rule	5	3.2 sq mi (8.3 km^{2})	1888	Hopkins
Whitesburg	1,773	2,139	-17.1%	Home Rule	4	3.2 sq mi (8.3 km^{2})	1876	Letcher
Whitesville	580	552	5.1%	Home Rule	6	0.4 sq mi (1.0 km^{2})	1867	Daviess
Wickliffe	670	688	-2.6%	Home Rule	5	1.1 sq mi (2.8 km^{2})	1882	Ballard
Wilder	3,176	3,035	4.6%	Home Rule	5	3.8 sq mi (9.8 km^{2})	1935	Campbell
Wildwood	281	261	7.7%	Home Rule	6	0.1 sq mi (0.3 km^{2})	1964	Jefferson
Williamsburg	5,326	5,245	1.5%	Home Rule	4	4.9 sq mi (12.7 km^{2})	1851	Whitley
Williamstown	3,894	3,925	-0.8%	Home Rule	5	17.0 sq mi (44.0 km^{2})	1858	Grant; Pendleton
Willisburg	300	282	6.4%	Home Rule	6	0.7 sq mi (1.8 km^{2})	1965	Washington
Wilmore	5,999	3,686	62.8%	Home Rule	4	0.9 sq mi (2.3 km^{2})	1918	Jessamine
Winchester	19,134	18,368	4.2%	Home Rule	3	7.9 sq mi (20.5 km^{2})	1793	Clark
Windy Hills	2,427	2,385	1.8%	Home Rule	5	0.9 sq mi (2.3 km^{2})	1952	Jefferson
Wingo	573	632	-9.3%	Home Rule	6	1.0 sq mi (2.6 km^{2})	1872	Graves
Woodburn	303	355	-14.6%	Home Rule	6	0.4 sq mi (1.0 km^{2})	1866	Warren
Woodbury	80	90	-11.1%	Home Rule	6	0.1 sq mi (0.3 km^{2})	1854	Butler
Woodland Hills	736	696	5.7%	Home Rule	6	0.2 sq mi (0.5 km^{2})	1961	Jefferson
Woodlawn	212	229	-7.4%	Home Rule	6	0.1 sq mi (0.3 km^{2})	1922	Campbell
Woodlawn Park	947	942	0.5%	Home Rule	5	0.3 sq mi (0.8 km^{2})	1955	Jefferson
Worthington	1,501	1,609	-6.7%	Home Rule	5	1.2 sq mi (3.1 km^{2})	1920	Greenup
Worthington Hills	1,563	1,446	8.1%	Home Rule	6	0.3 sq mi (0.8 km^{2})	1980	Jefferson
Worthville	181	185	-2.2%	Home Rule	6	0.3 sq mi (0.8 km^{2})	1878	Carroll
Wurtland	983	995	-1.2%	Home Rule	5	1.8 sq mi (4.7 km^{2})	1970	Greenup

- A All but two of Kentucky's county seats are cities. The exceptions are Whitley City (McCreary Co.) and Burlington (Boone Co.). Two Kentucky counties have dual seats of government: the seats of Campbell Co. are Alexandria and Newport and the seats of Kenton Co. are Independence and Covington.
- B Unless otherwise noted, population and area are given according to the 2010 U.S. census.
- C Dates are those of the most recent formal incorporation, according to the records of the Commonwealth of Kentucky's Land Office.
- D For municipalities located in more than one county, the primary county (according to the U.S. census) is listed first.

== Former cities ==
Following the 2015 reorganization of cities, 12 have been disincorporated or administratively dissolved:

Former cities in Kentucky
Name	County	Population (2010)	Area (2010)		Dissolved
Name	County	Population (2010)	sq mi	km^{2}	Dissolved
Allensville	Todd	157	0.93	2.4	2017
Bonnieville	Hart	255	0.56	1.5	2024
Blackey	Letcher	120	0.44	1.1	2022
Blaine	Lawrence	47	0.28	0.7	2024
Blandville	Ballard	90	0.21	0.5	2023
Monterey	Owen	138	0.26	0.7	2025
Poplar Hills	Jefferson	362	0.03	0.1	2025
Raywick	Marion	134	0.90	2.3	2024
South Park View	Jefferson	7	0.12	0.3	2025
Vicco	Perry	334	0.85	2.2	2025
Wallins Creek	Harlan	156	0.31	0.8	2016
Water Valley	Graves	279	0.62	1.6	2016

== Gallery ==
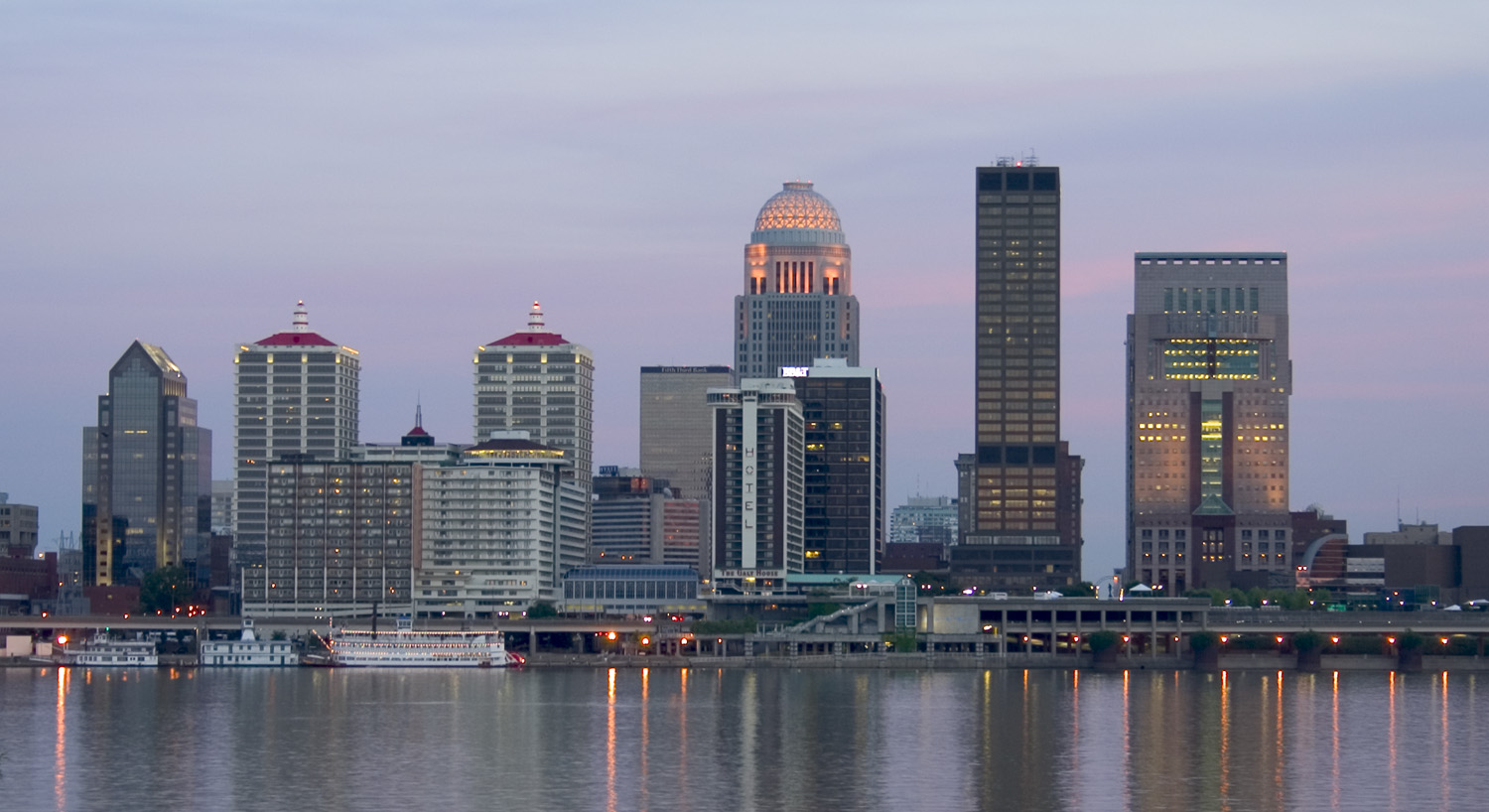
Louisville, the largest city in Kentucky

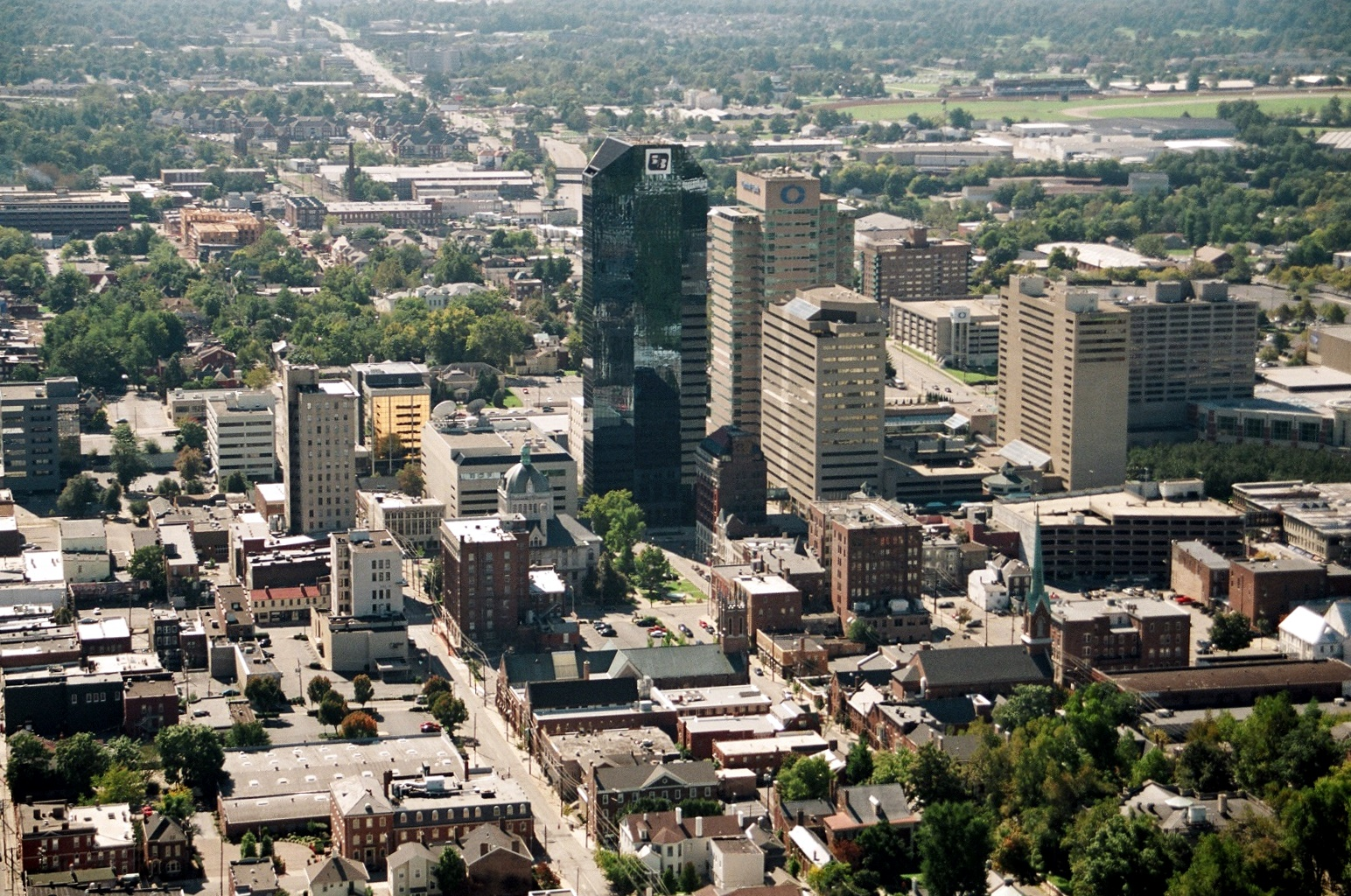
Lexington, home of the University of Kentucky

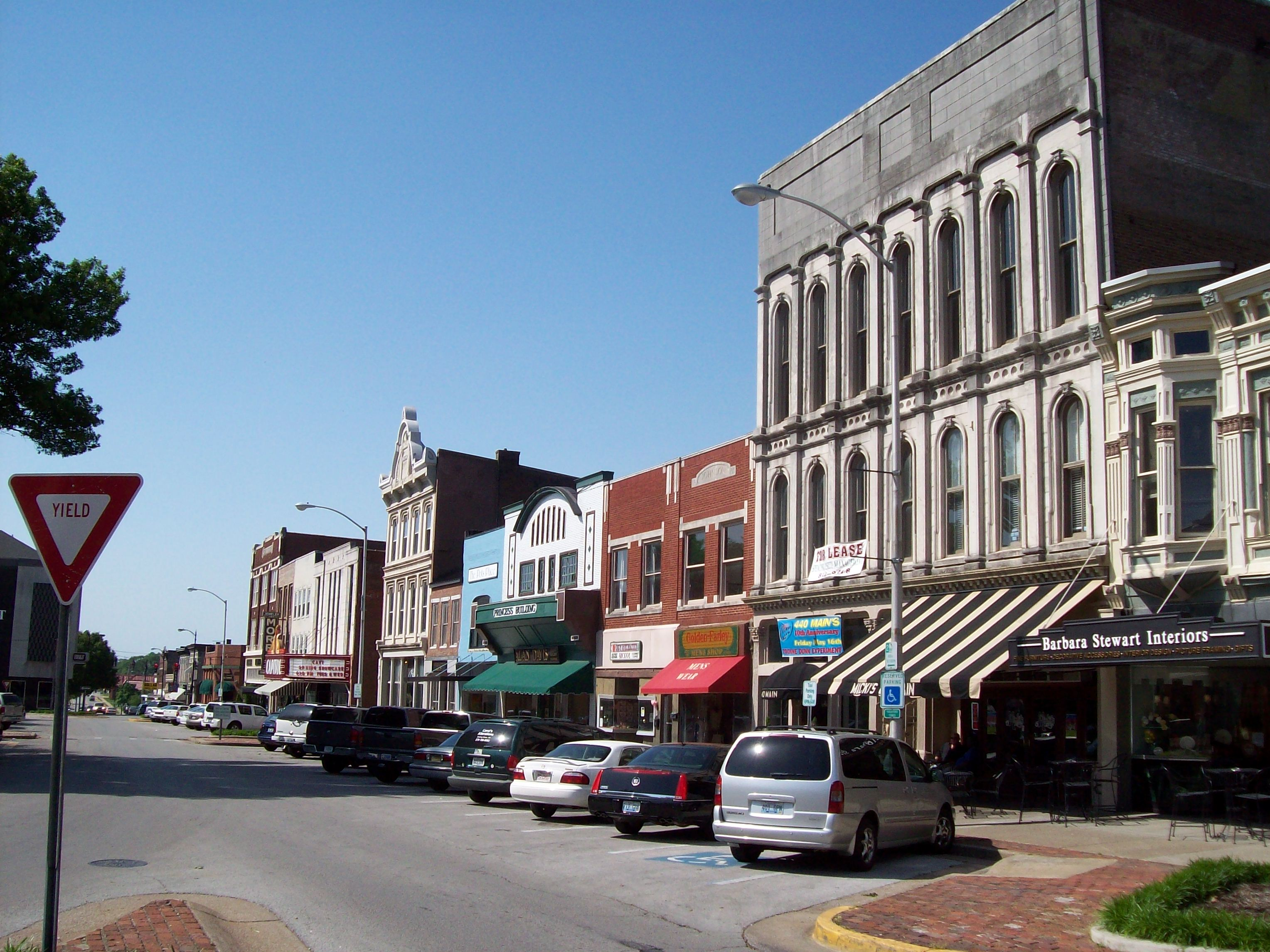
Fountain Square in Bowling Green, a base of GM's Corvette production

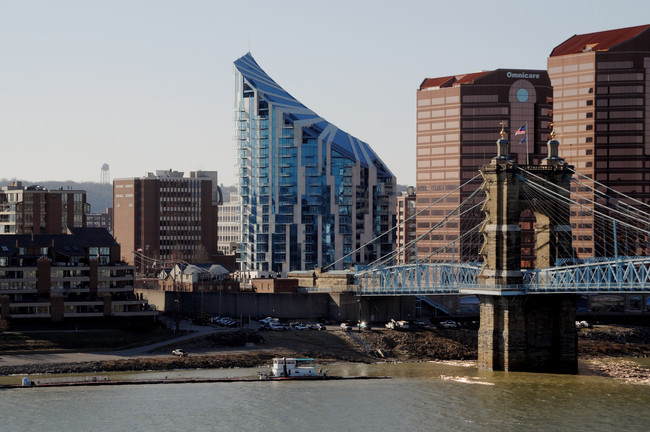
Covington, a suburb of Cincinnati

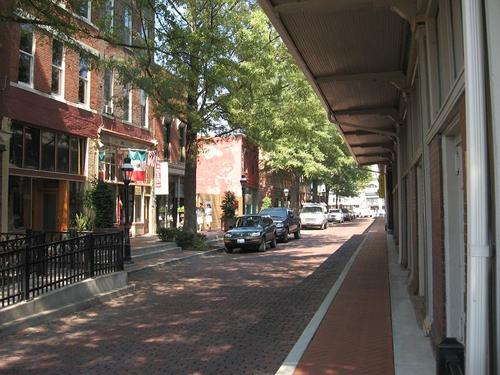
Paducah

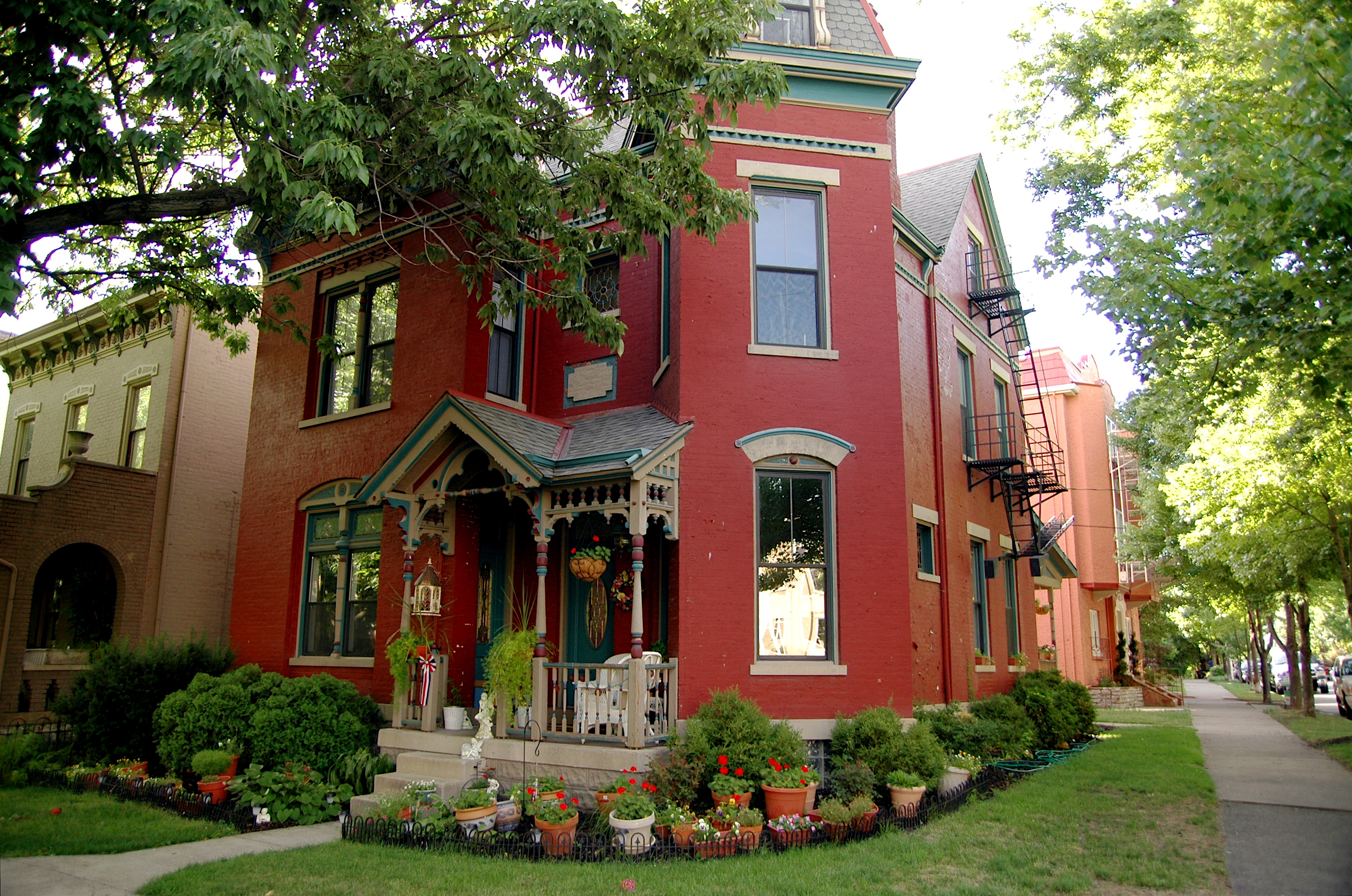
Newport

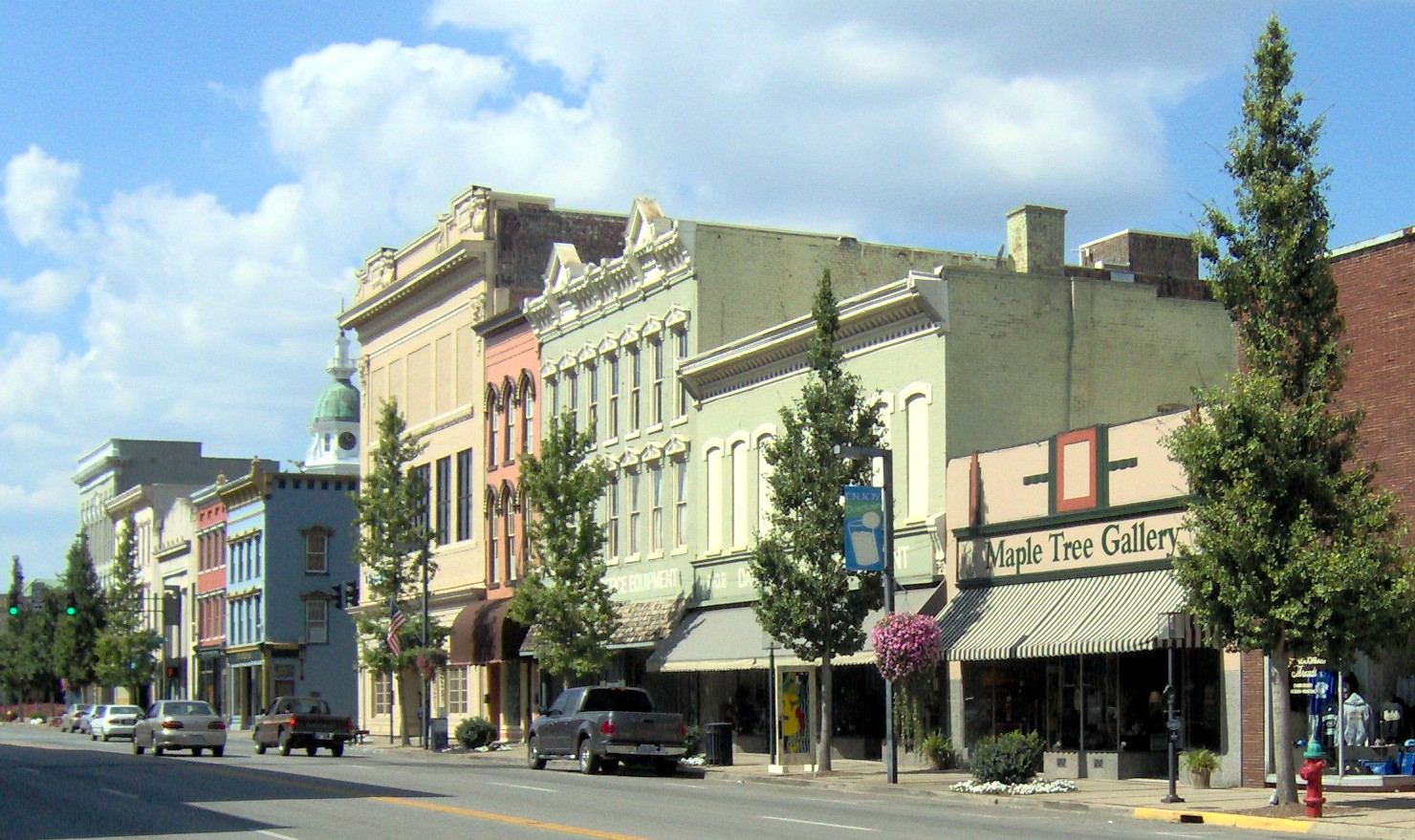
Danville, home of Centre College.

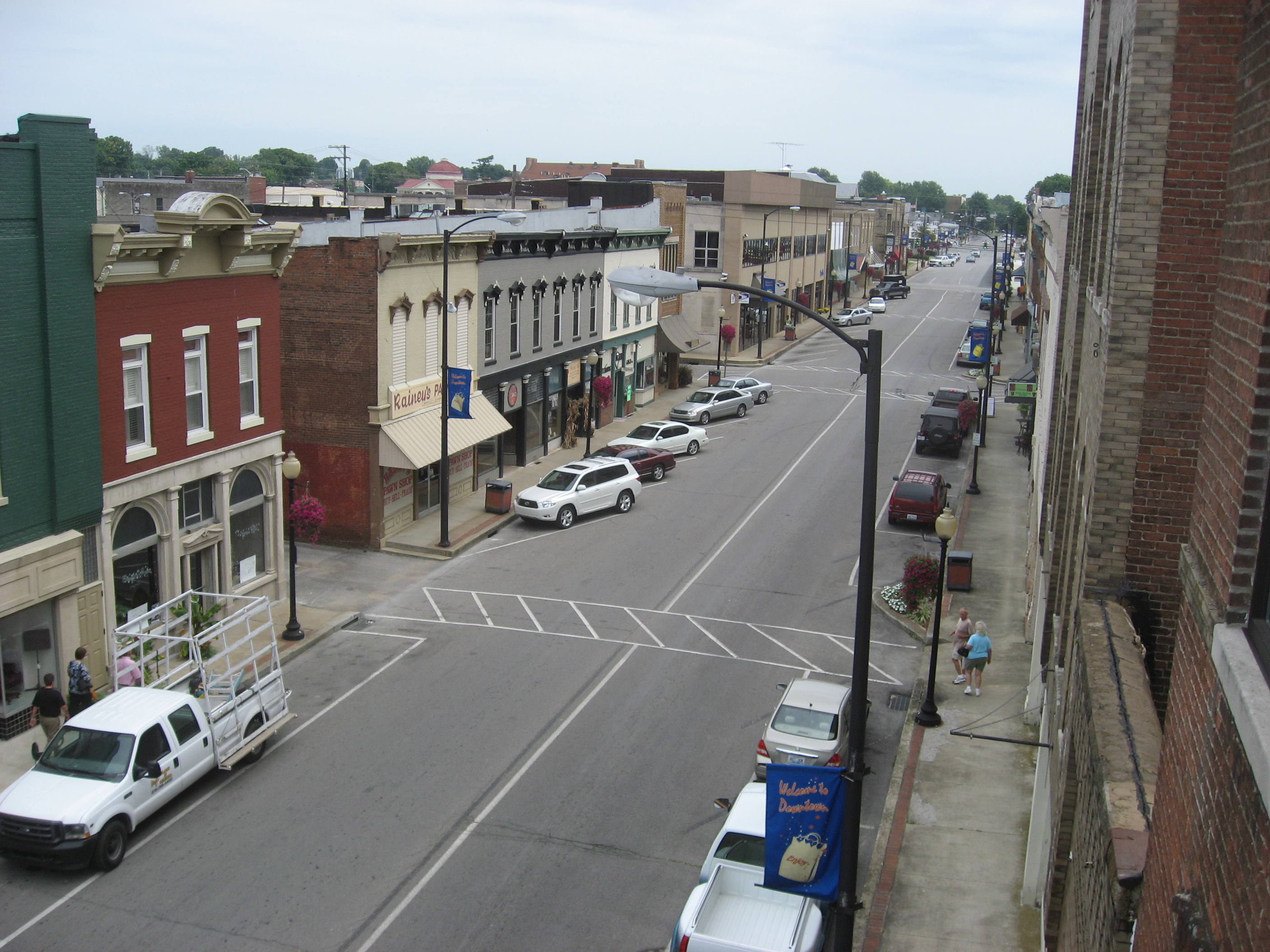
Campbellsville

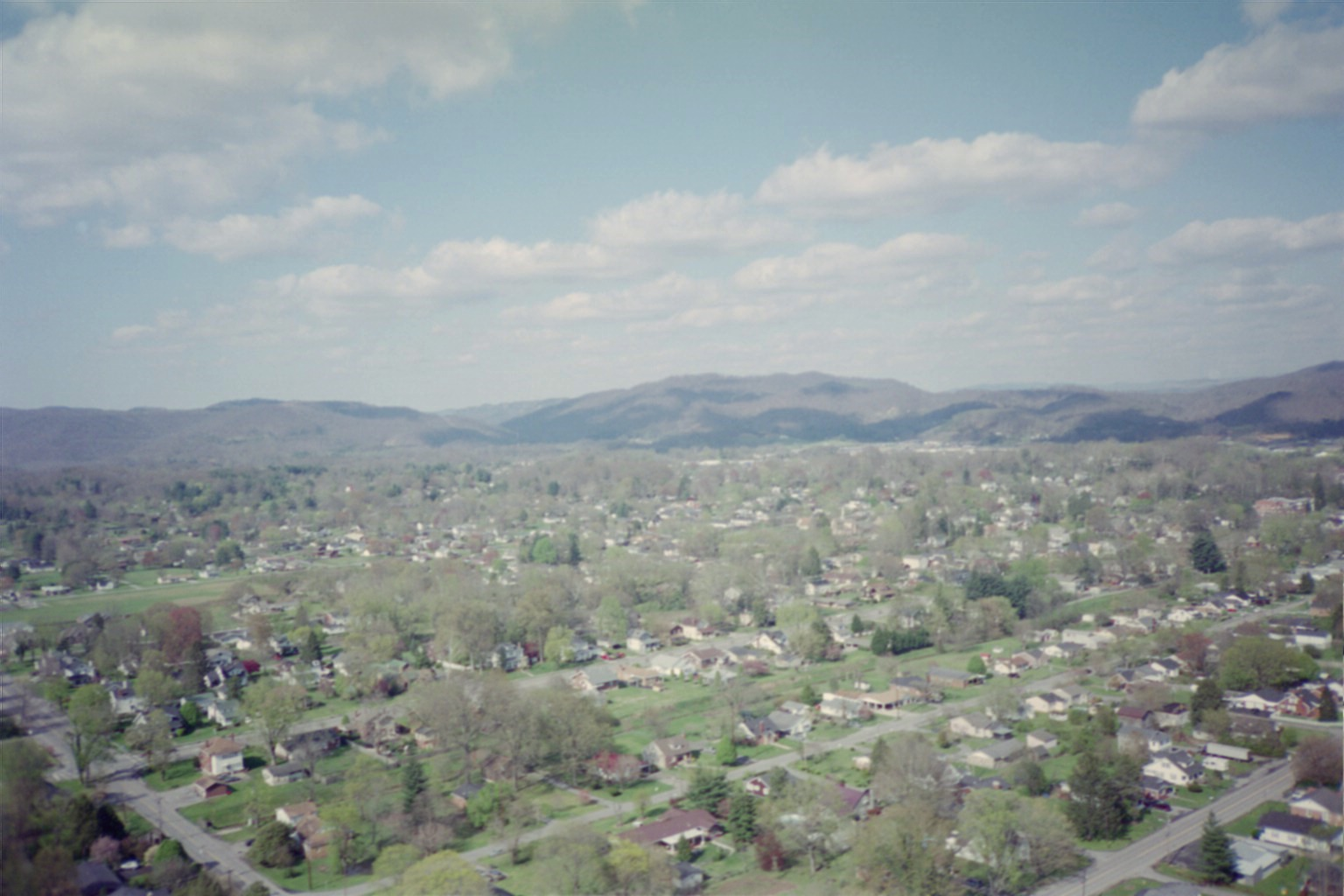
Middlesboro

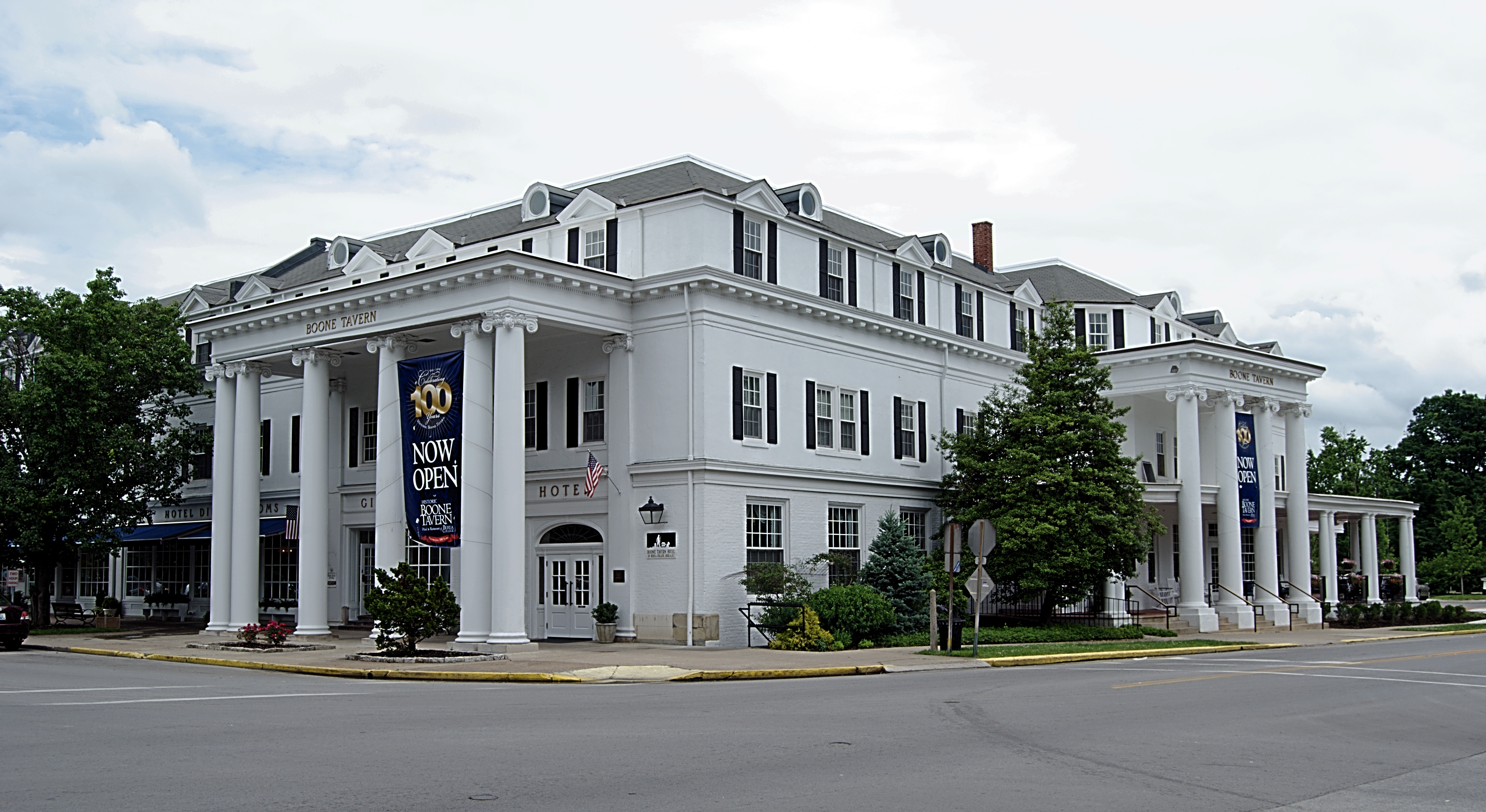
Berea

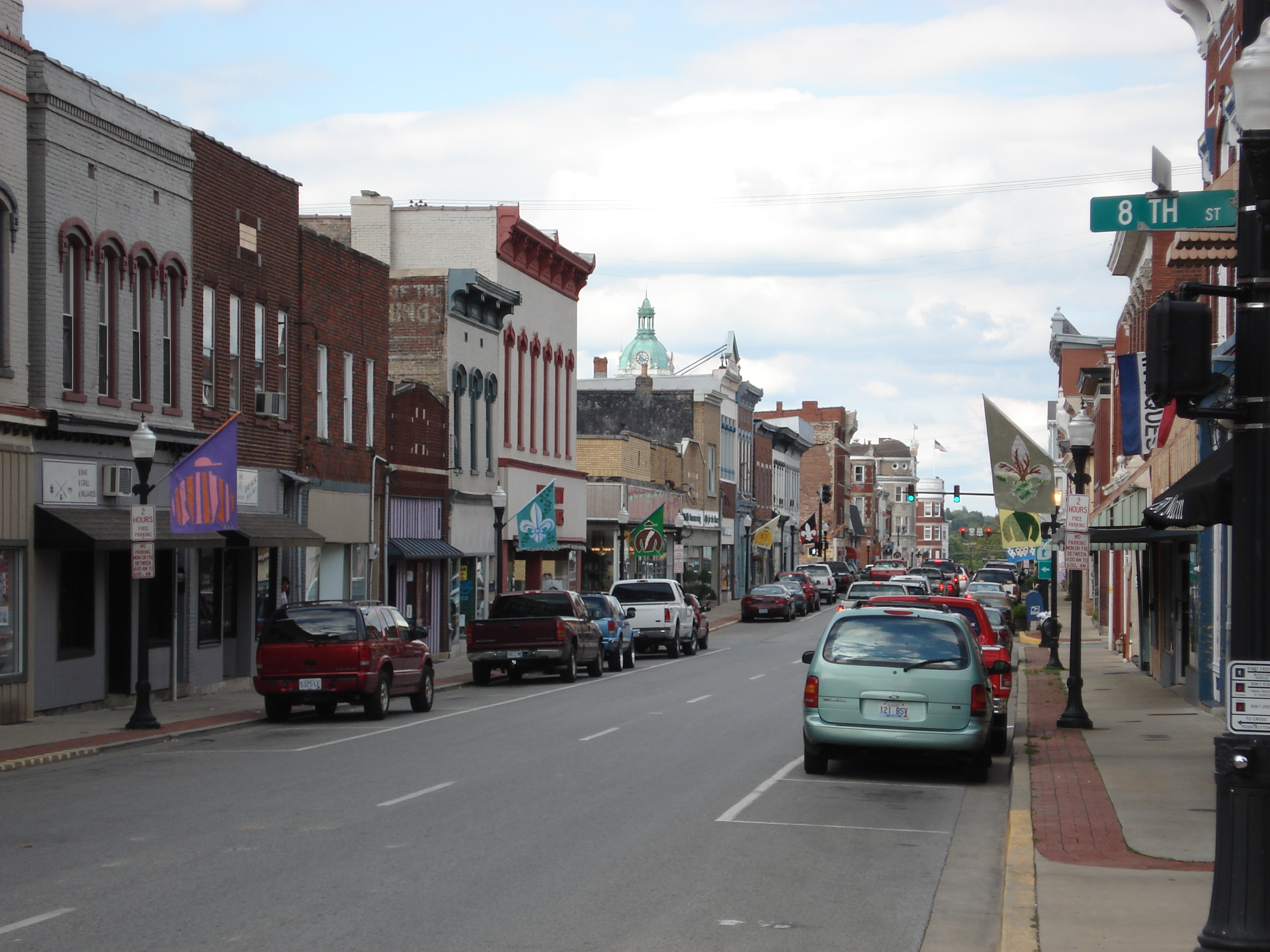
Paris

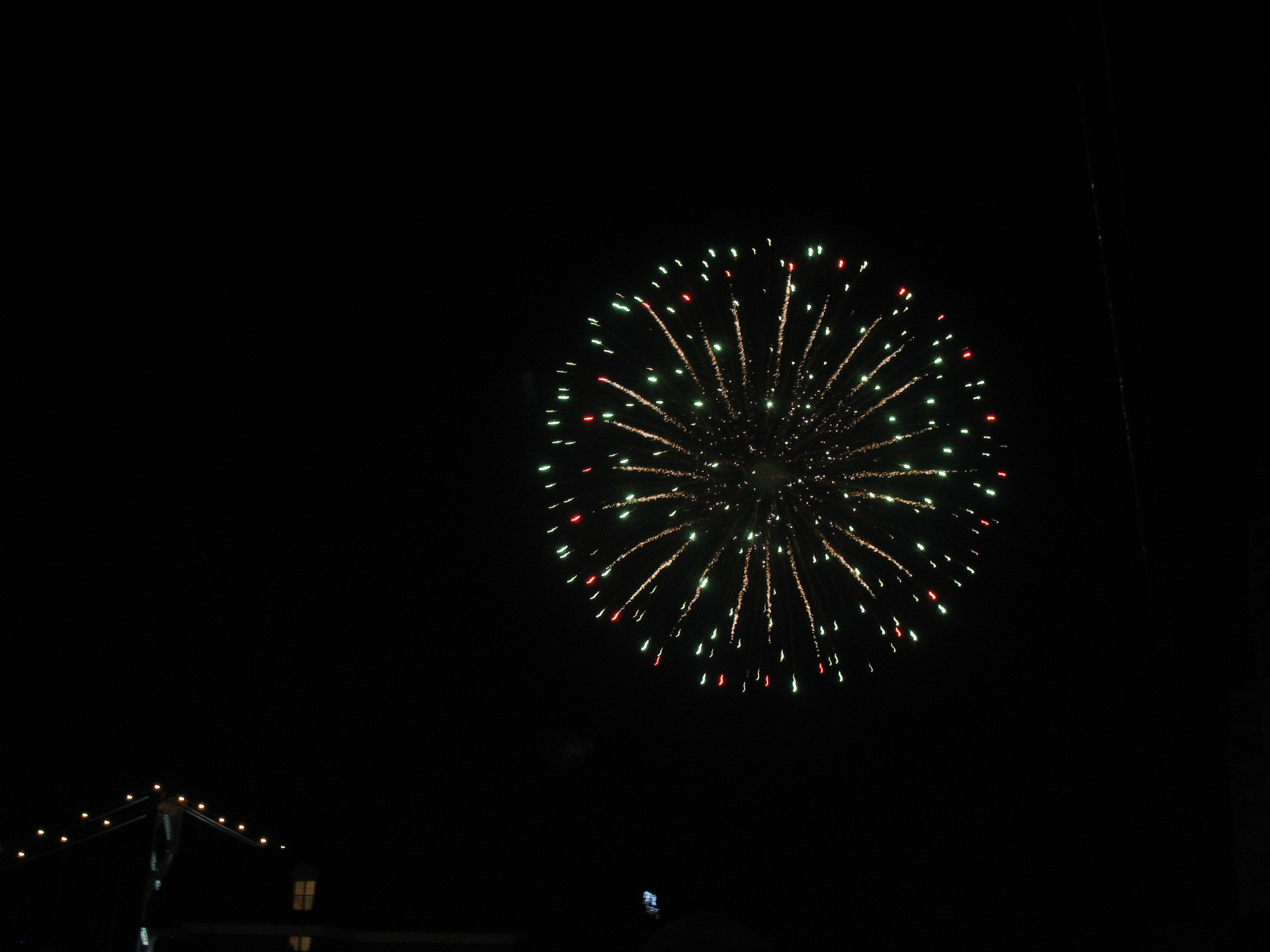
Maysville

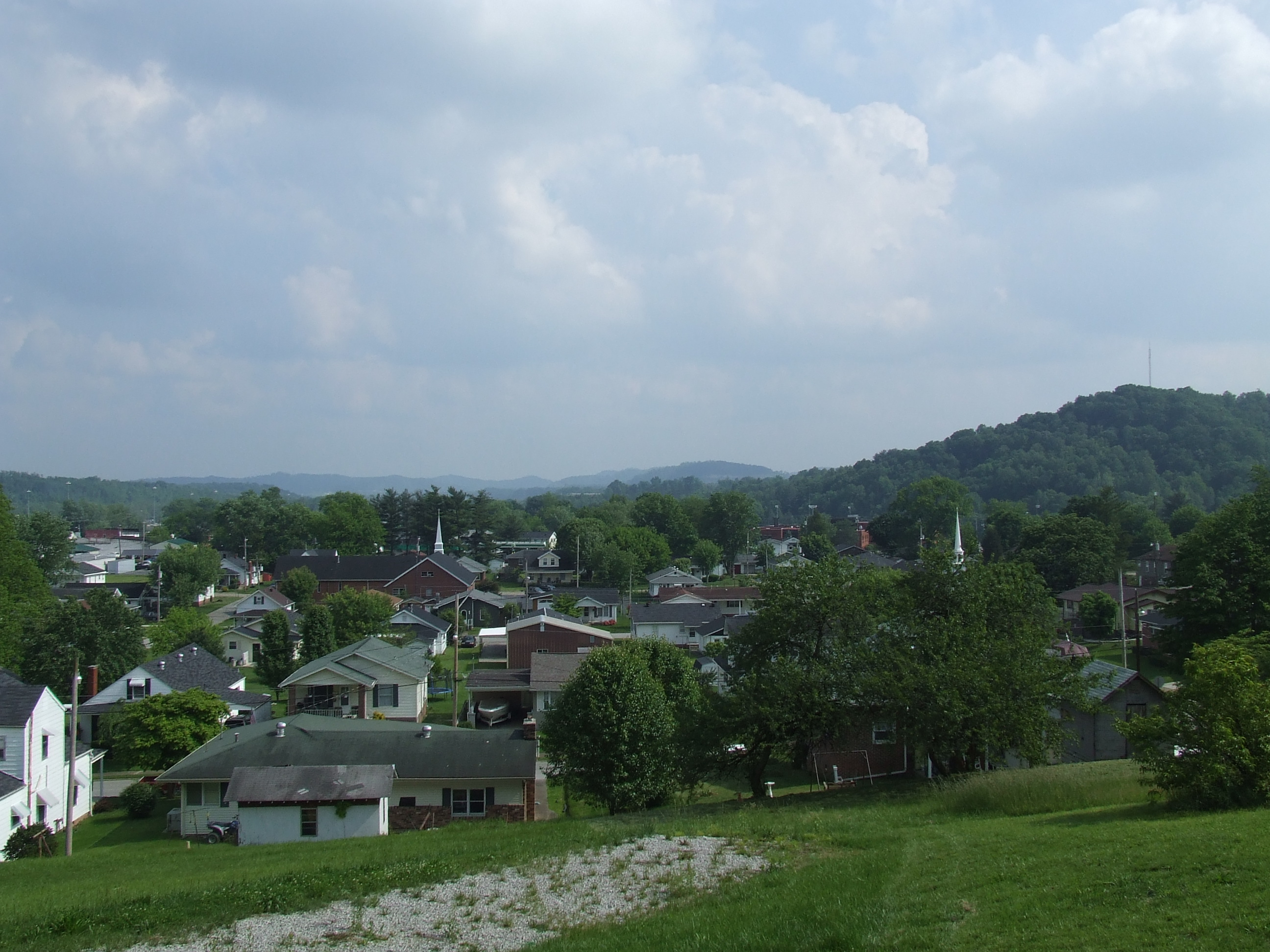
Corbin

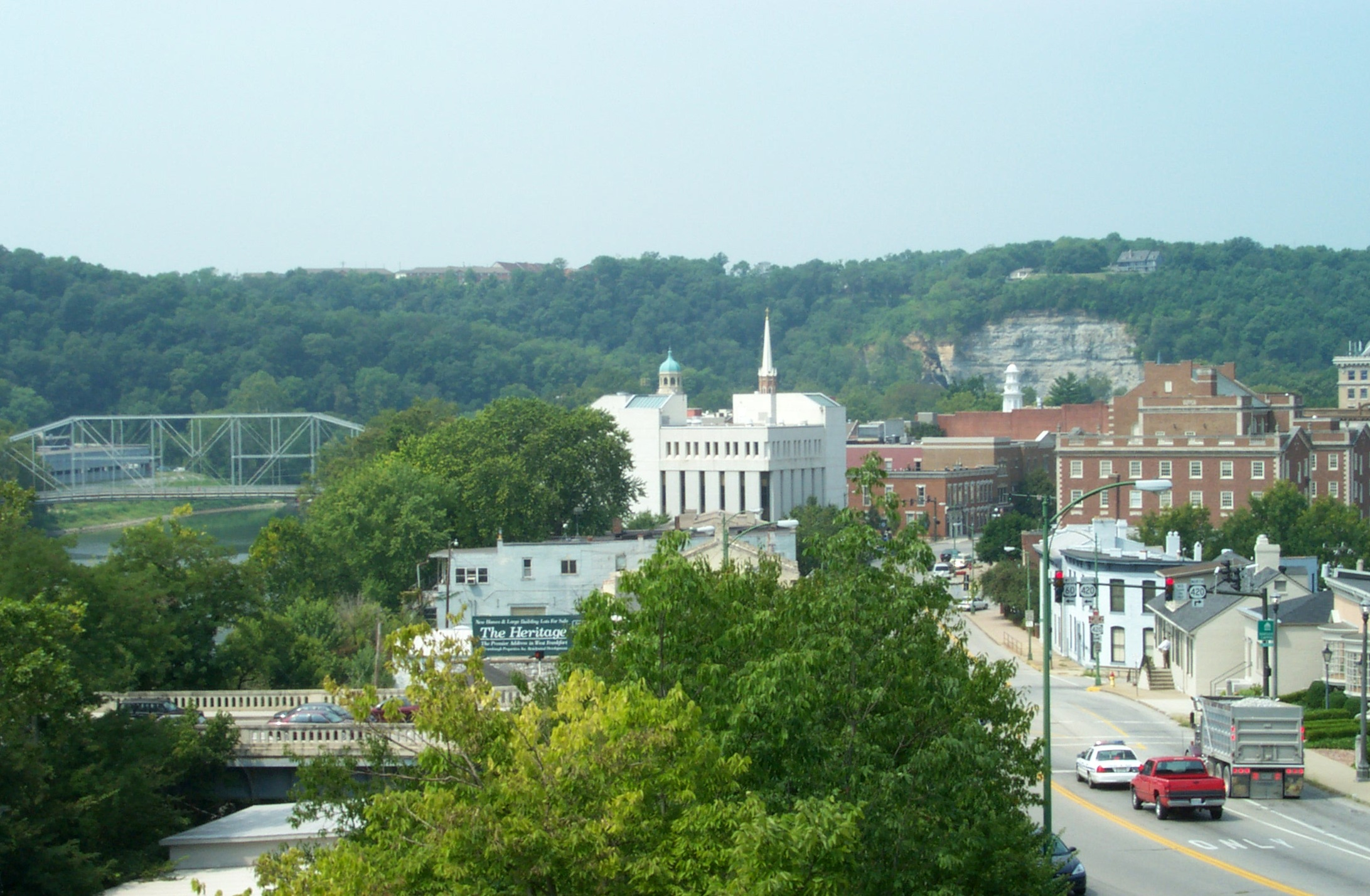
Frankfort, the state capital

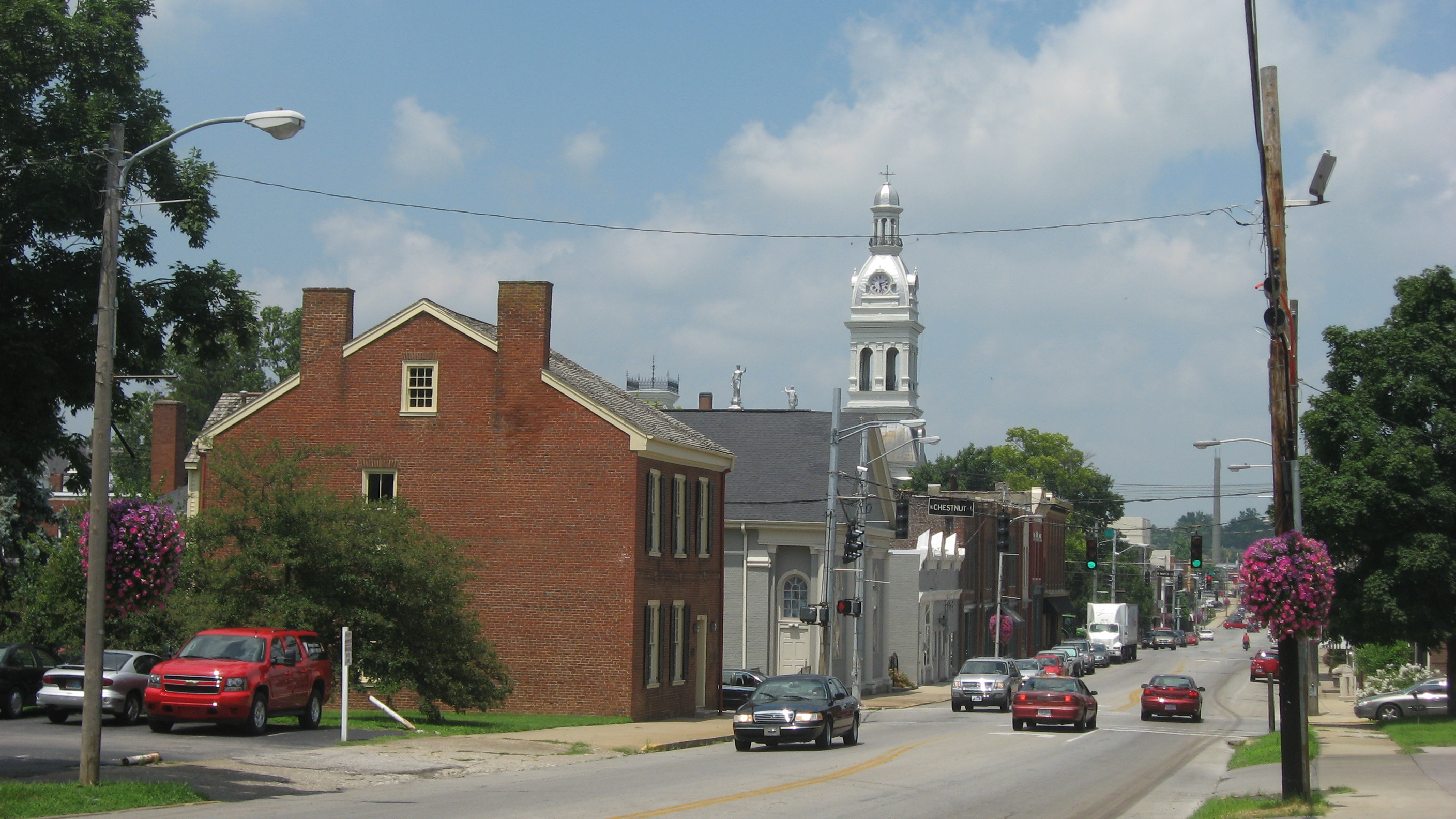
Nicholasville

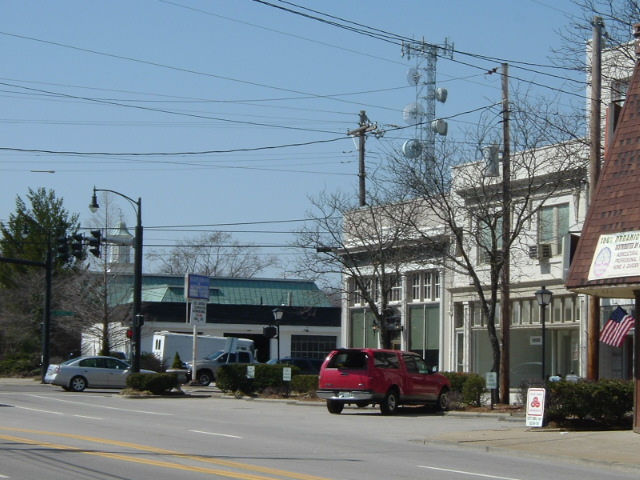
Jeffersontown

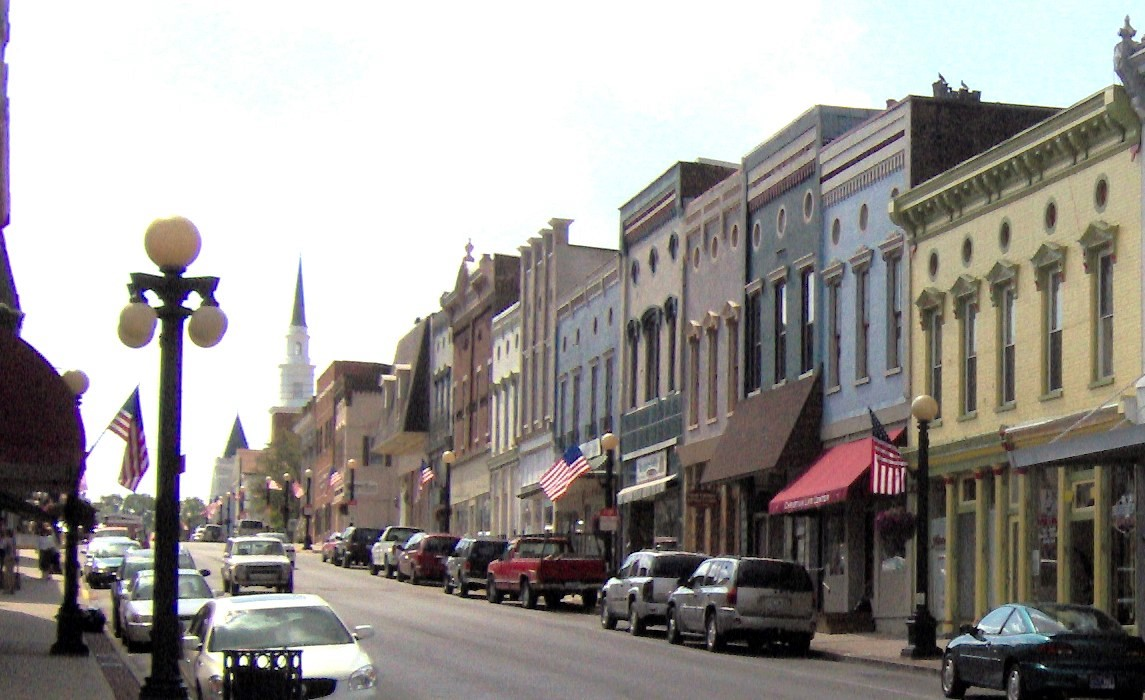
Harrodsburg

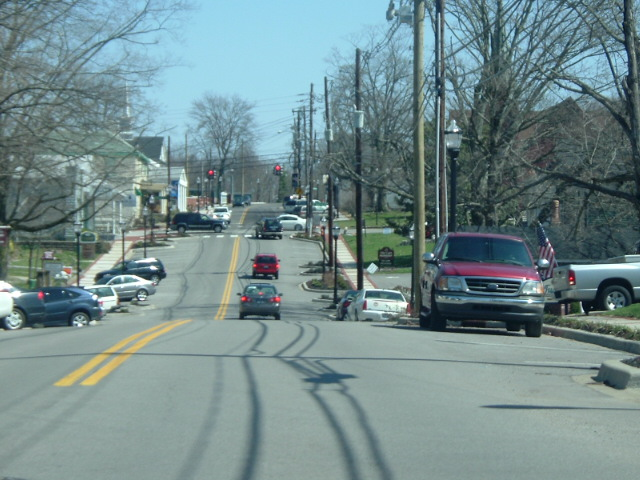
Middletown

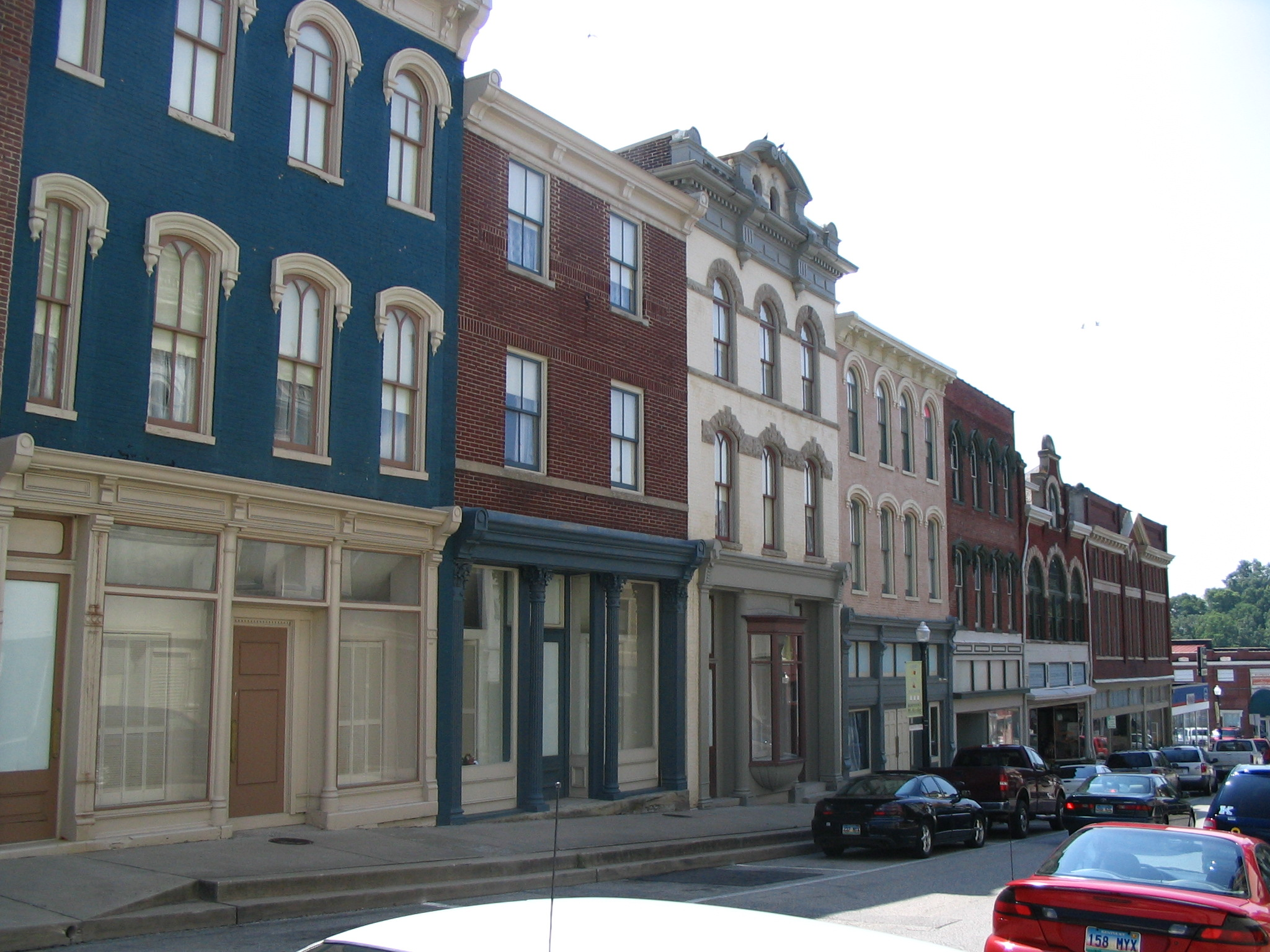
Mount Sterling

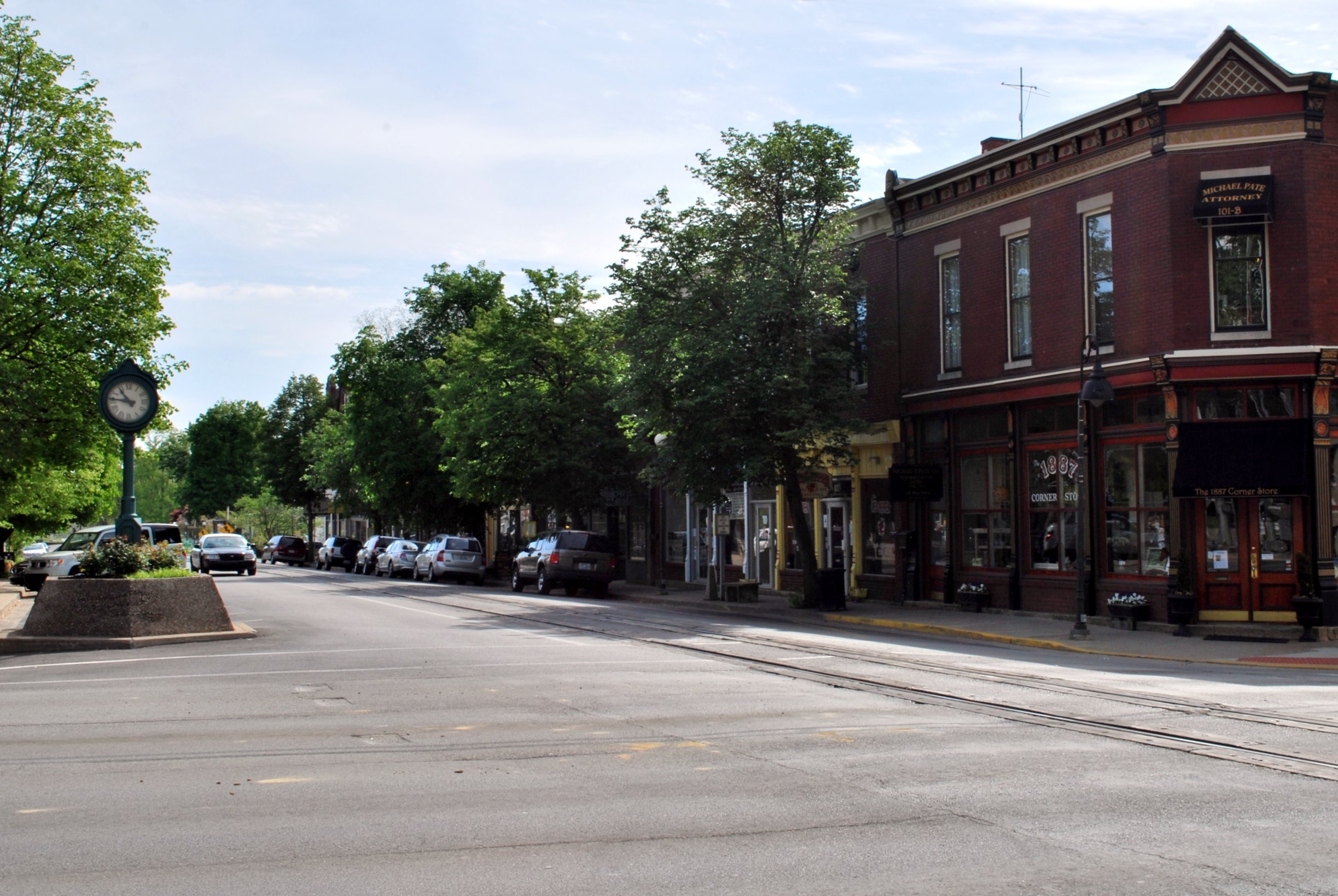
La Grange

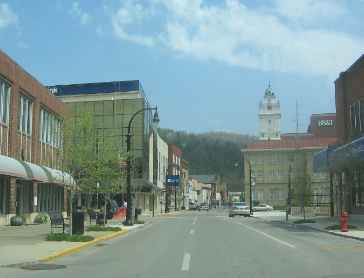
Pikeville

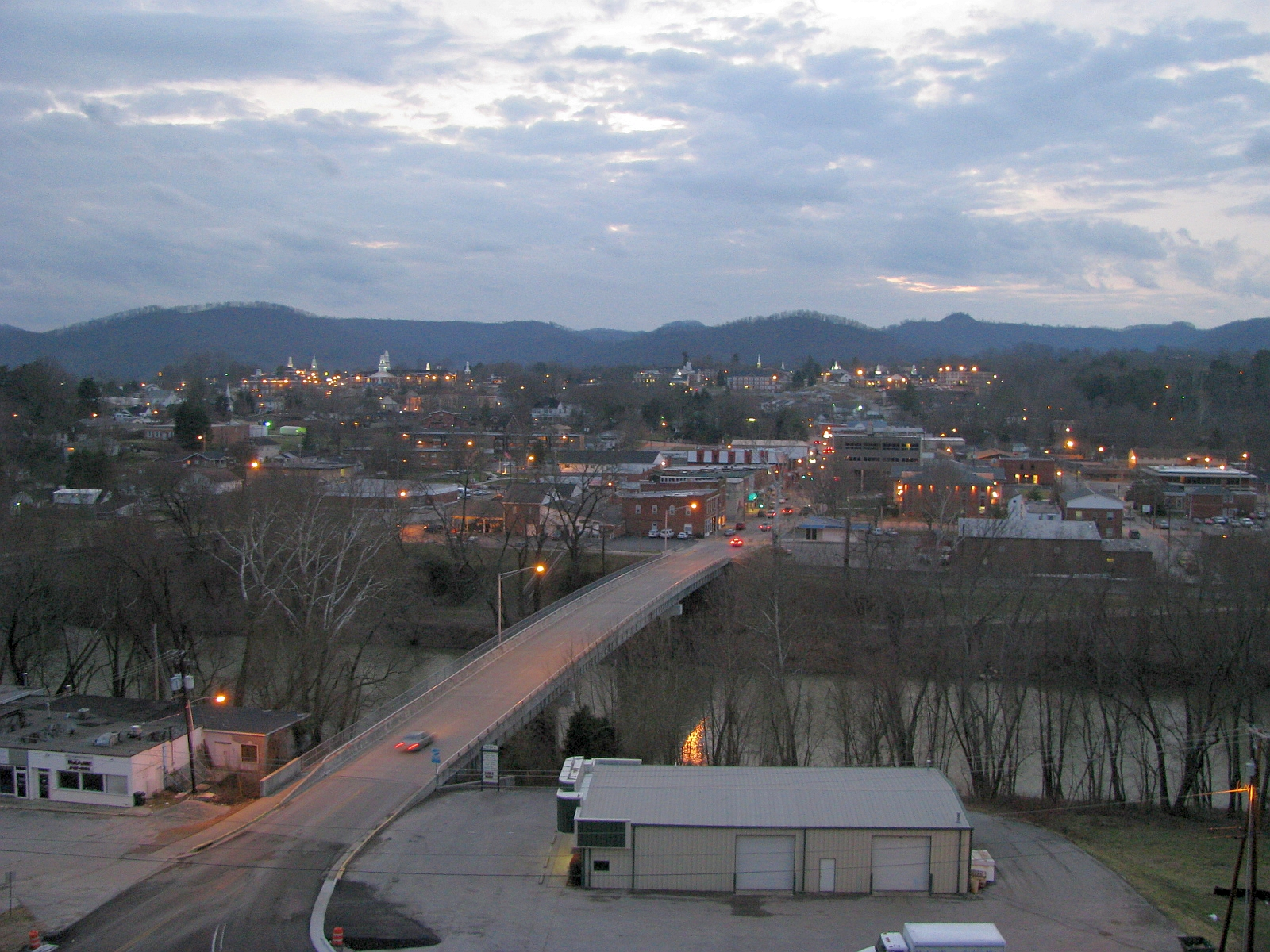
Williamsburg

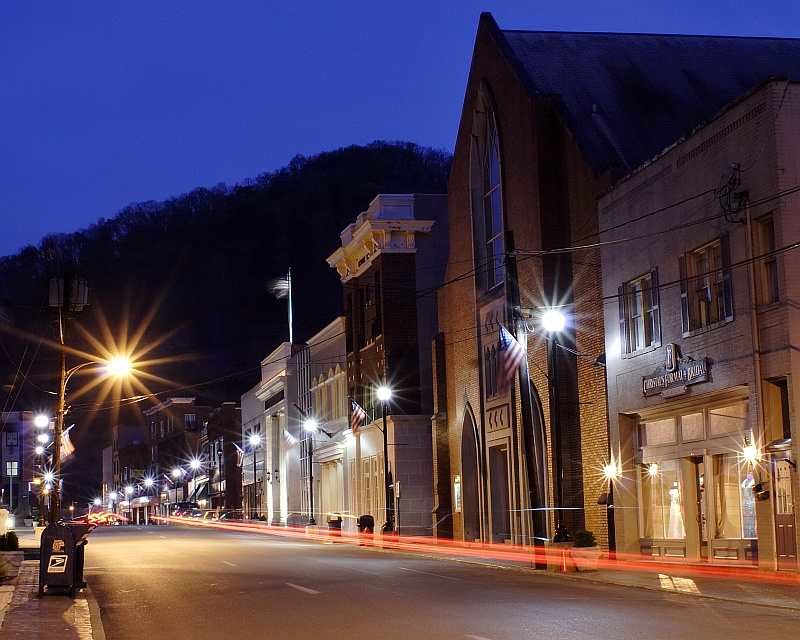
Hazard

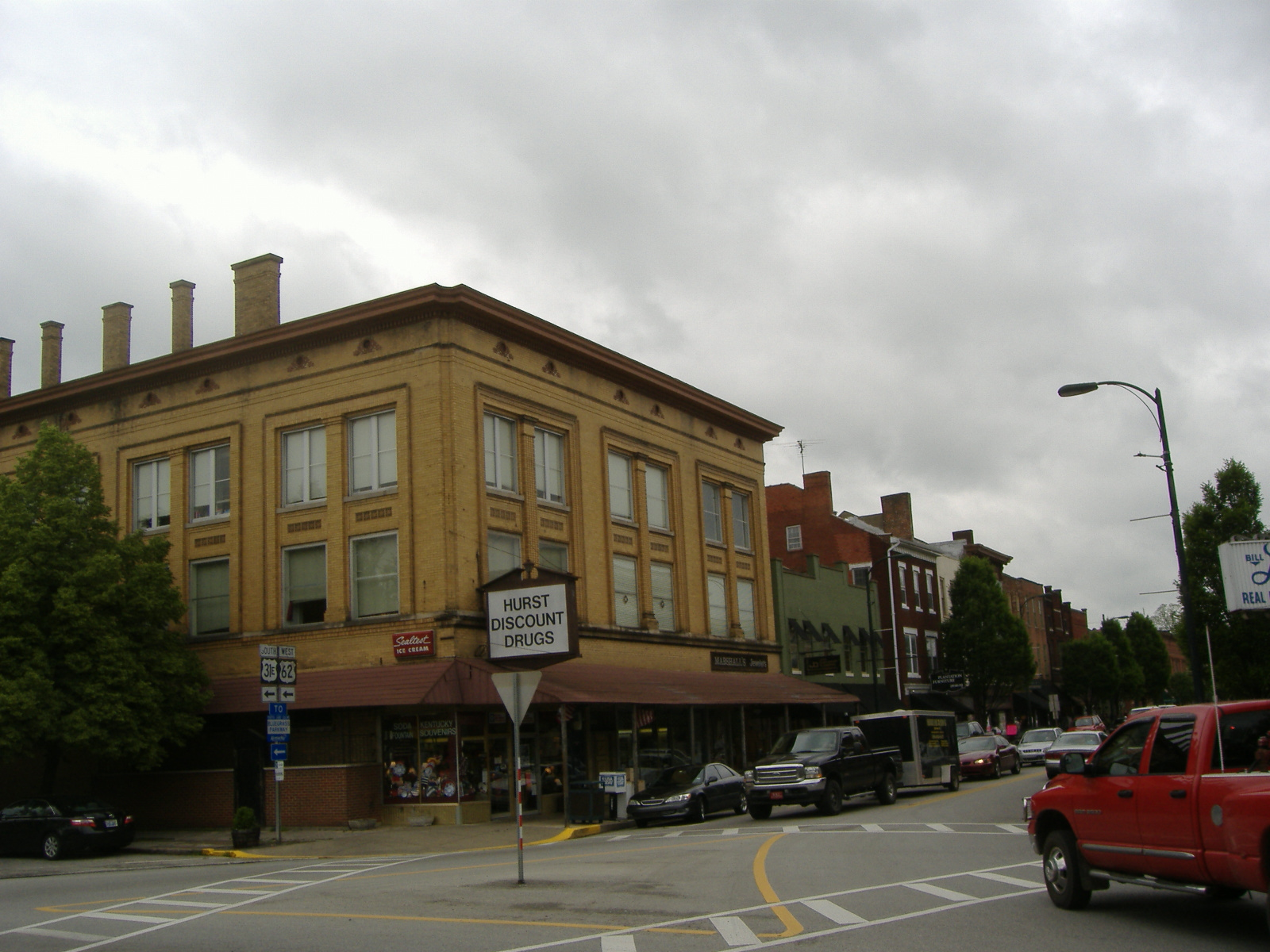
Bardstown, home of "My Old Kentucky Home"

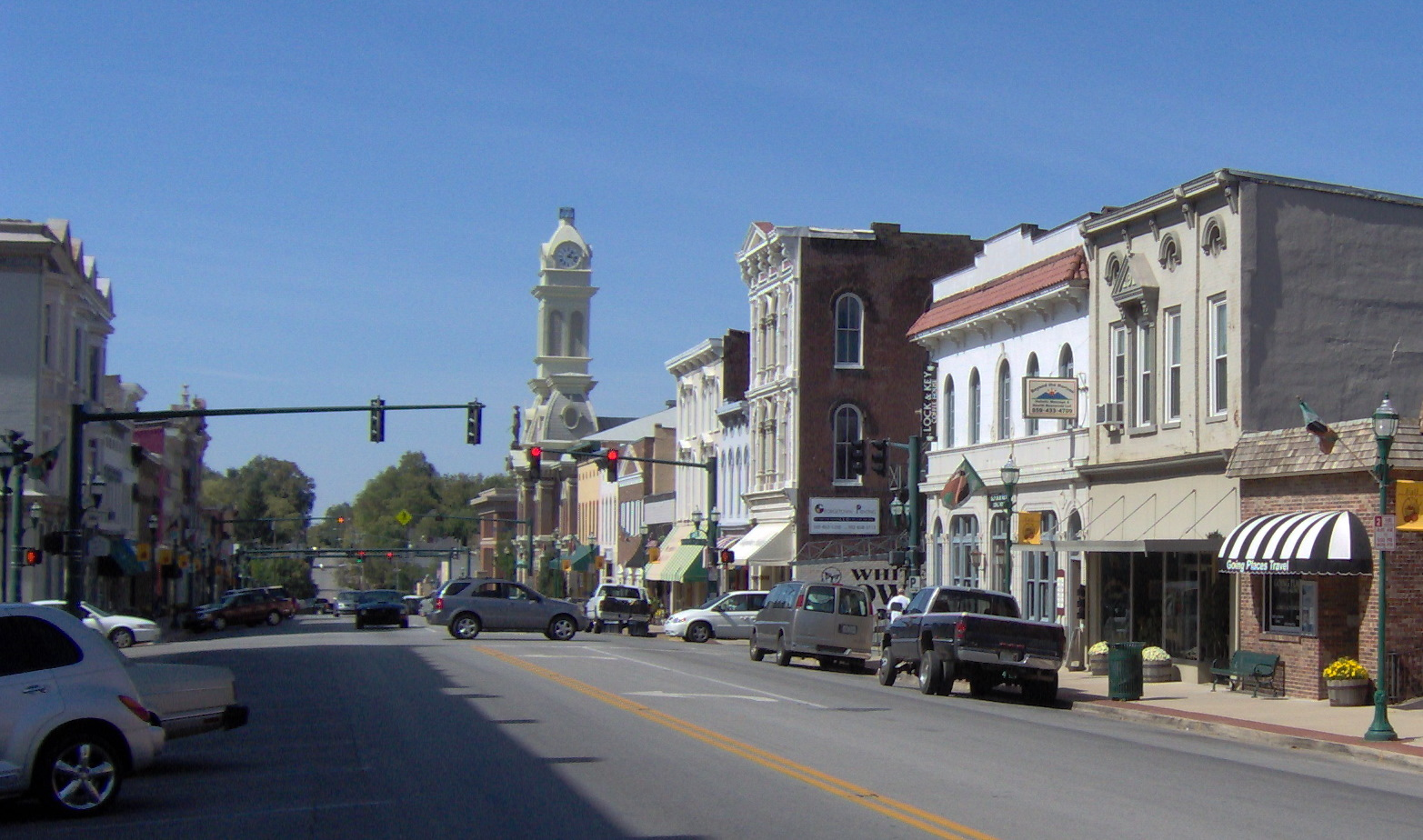
Georgetown

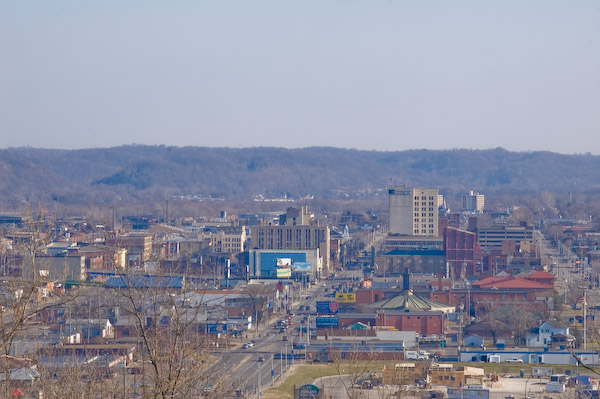
Ashland

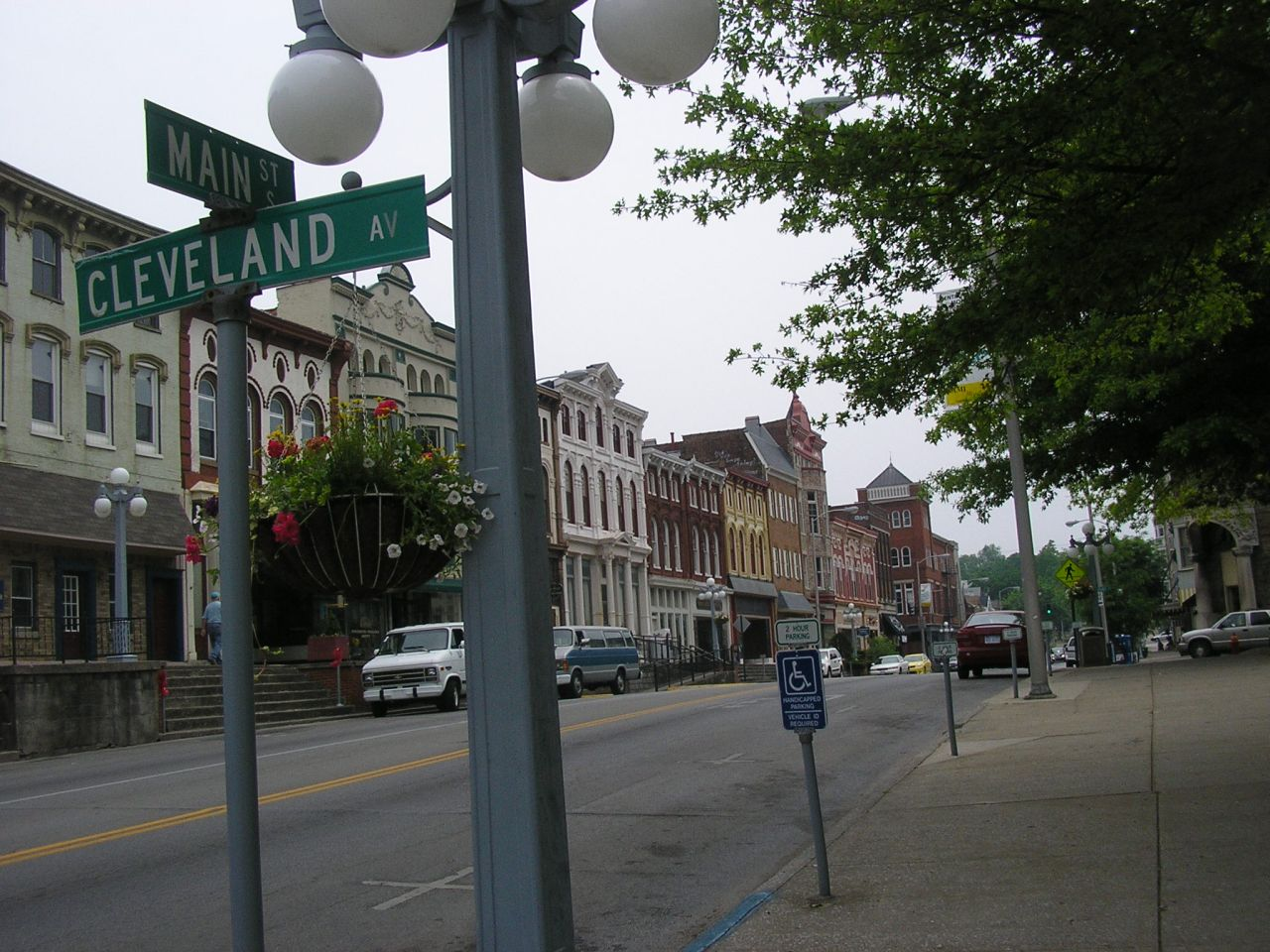
Winchester

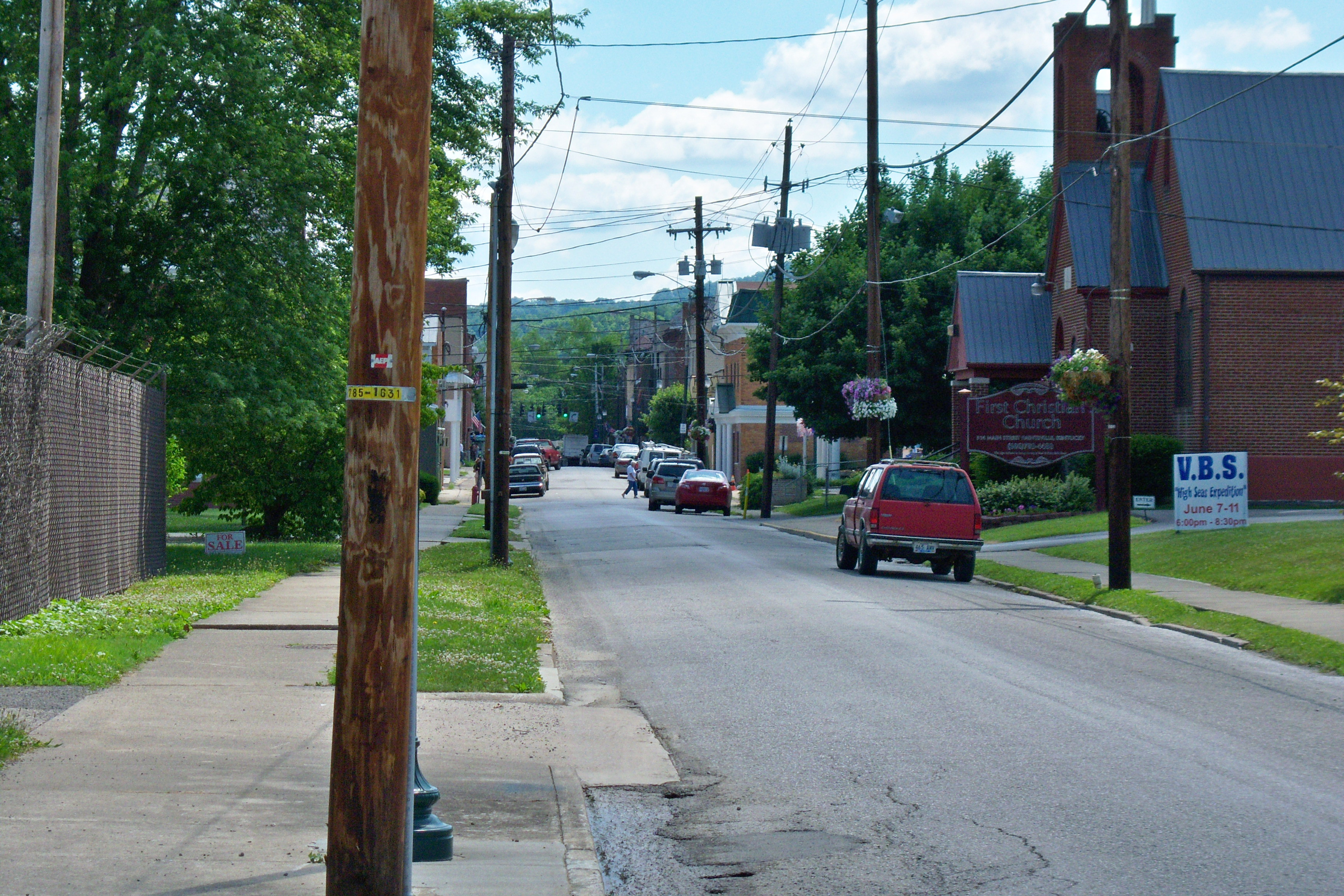
Paintsville

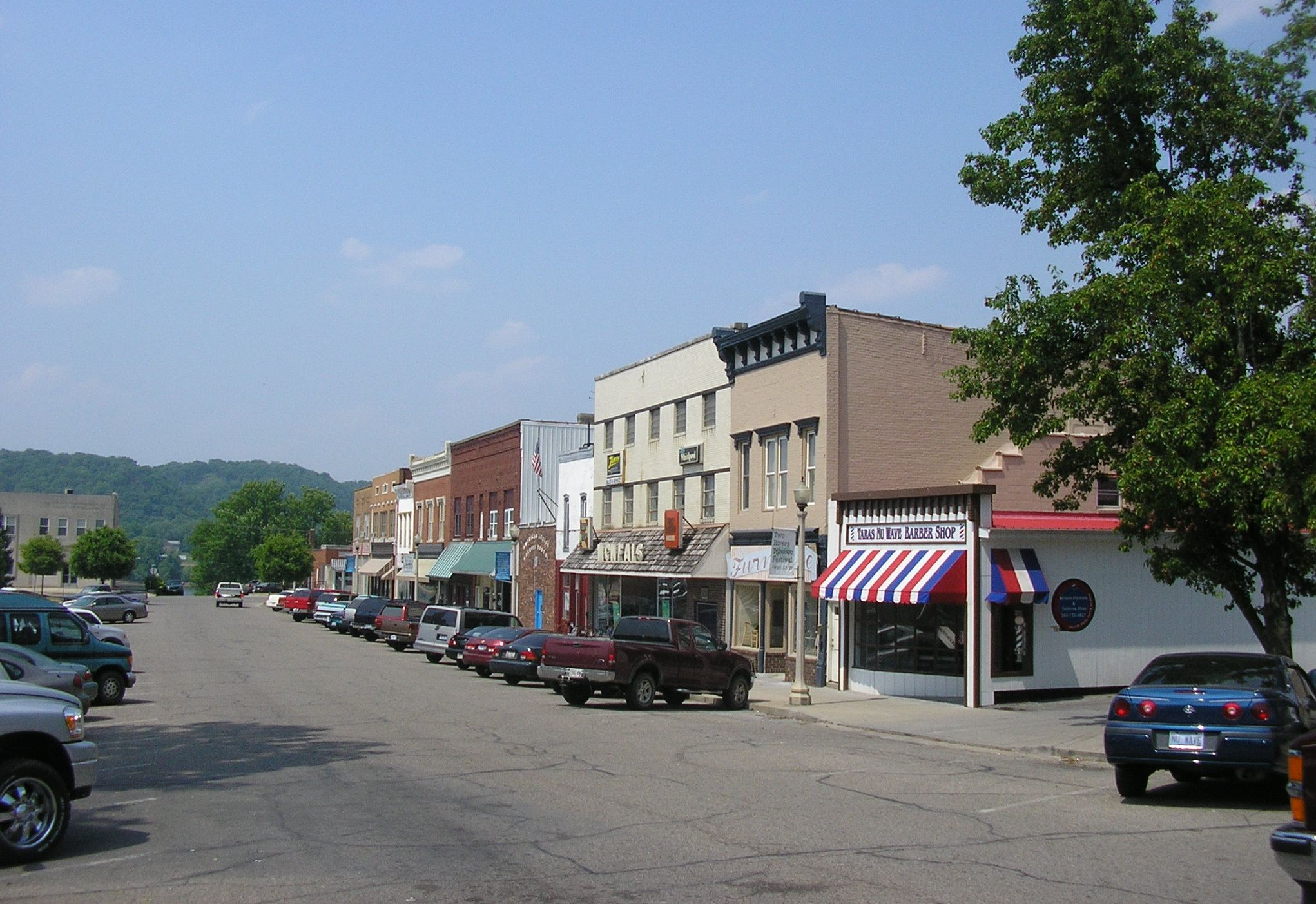
Carrollton

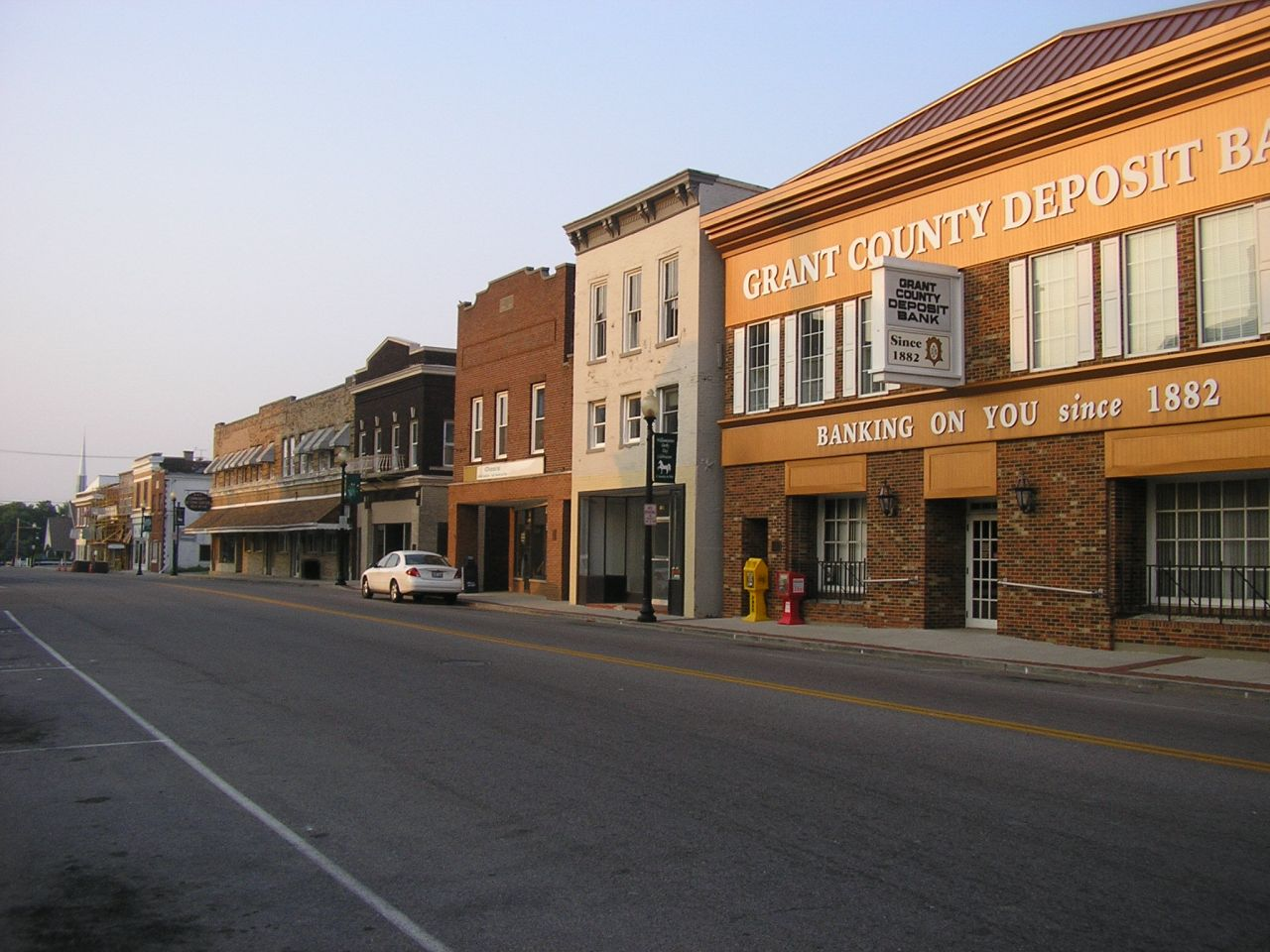
Williamstown

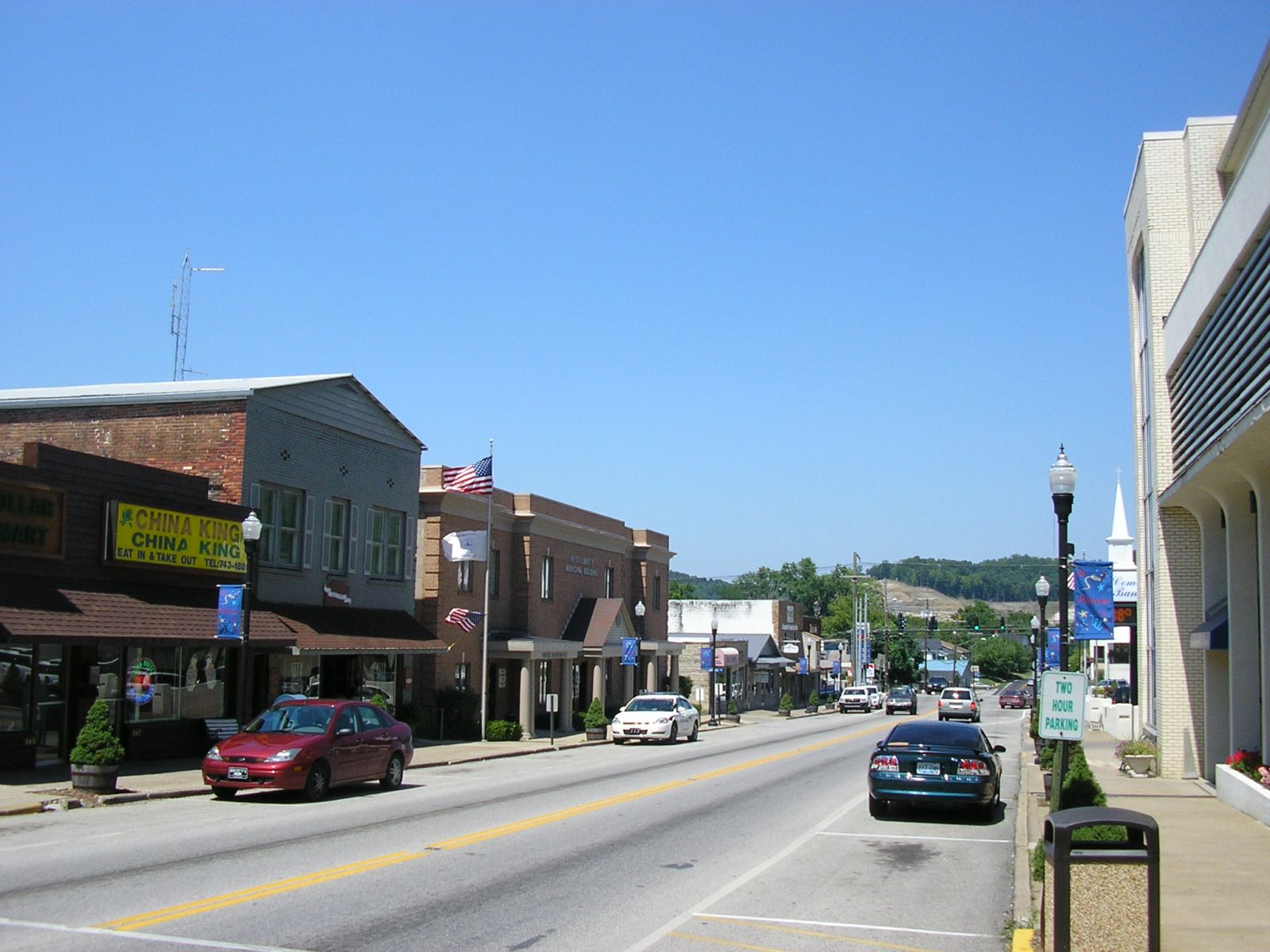
West Liberty

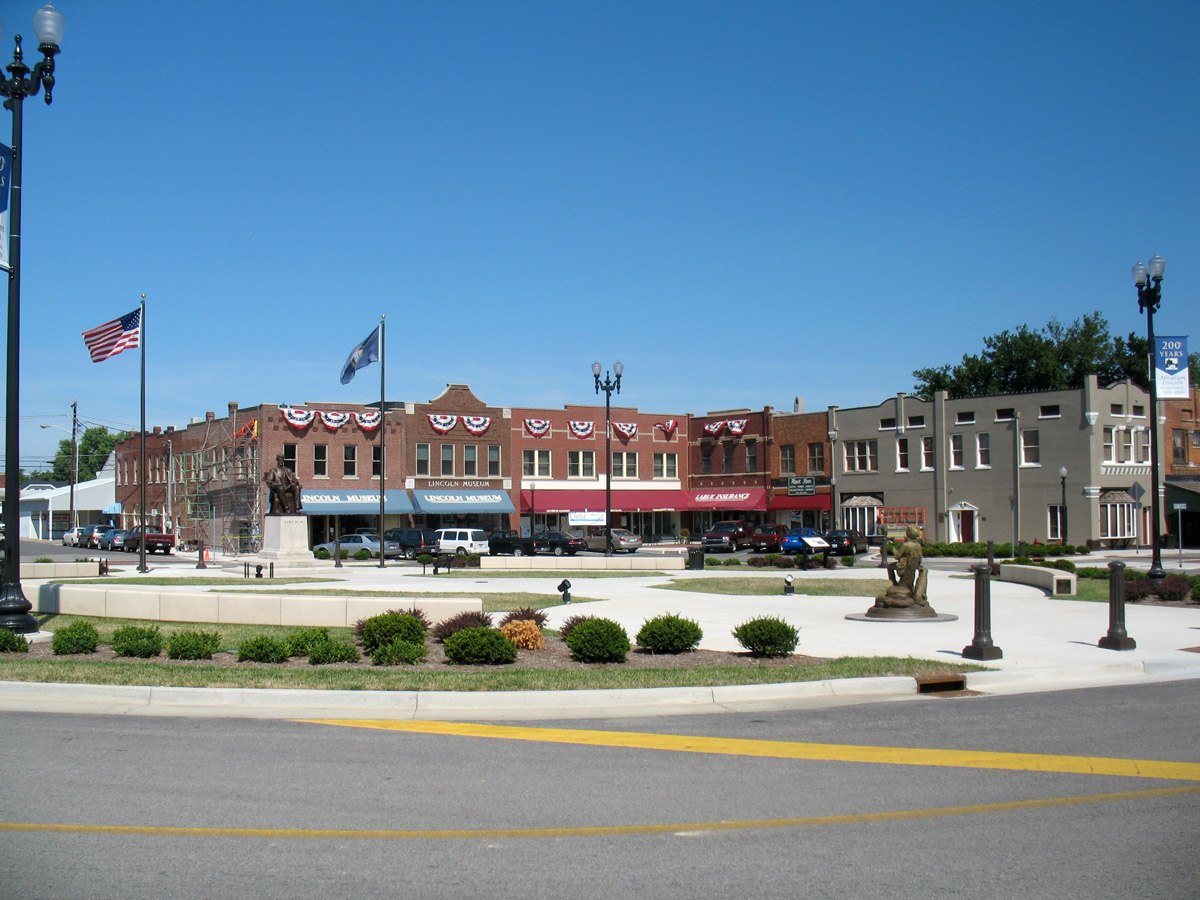
Hodgenville

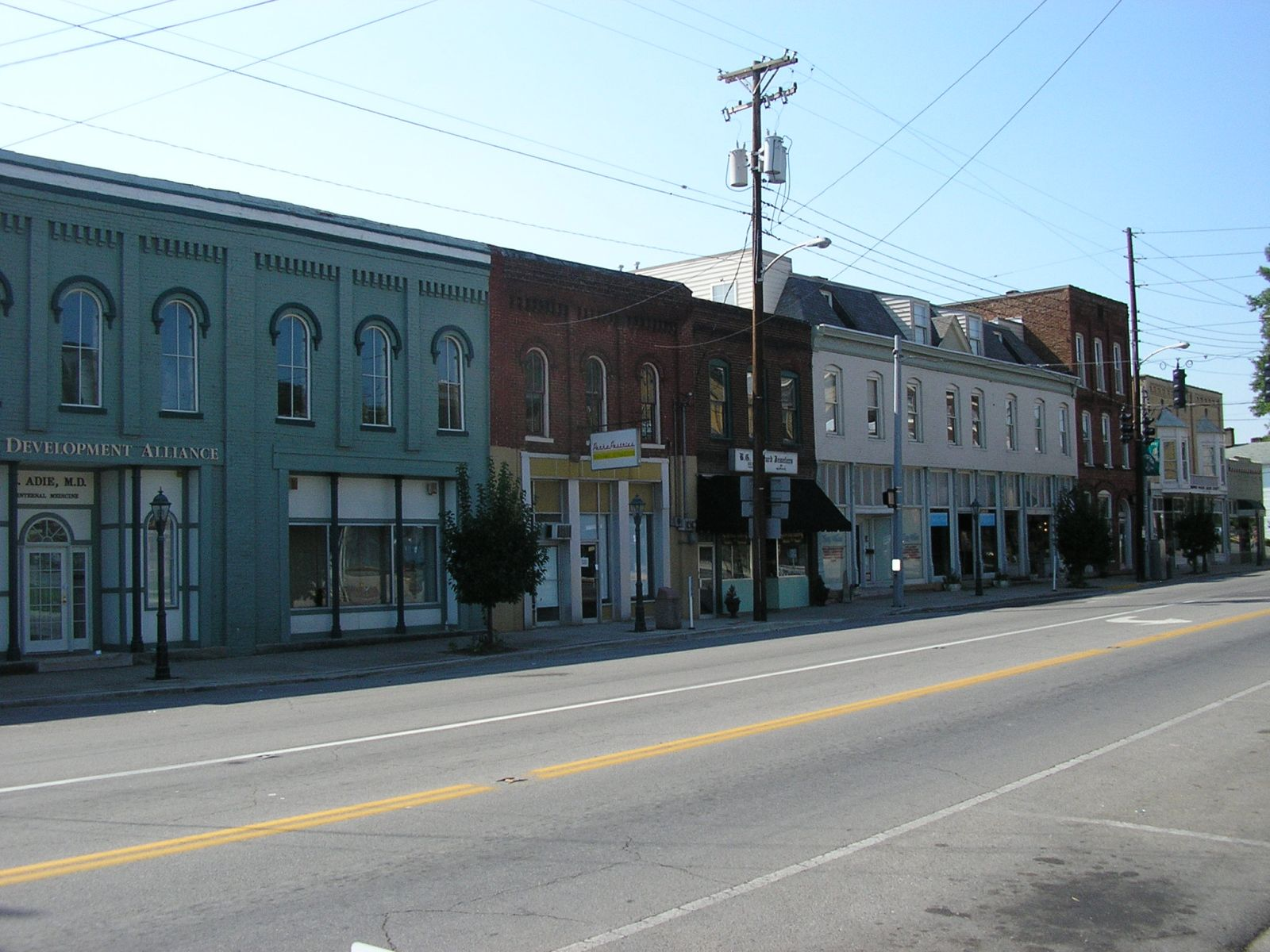
Irvine

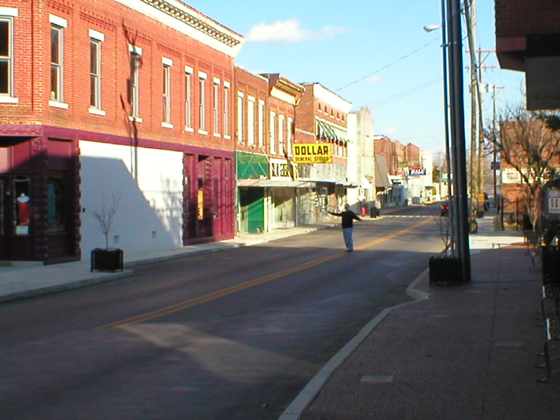
Horse Cave

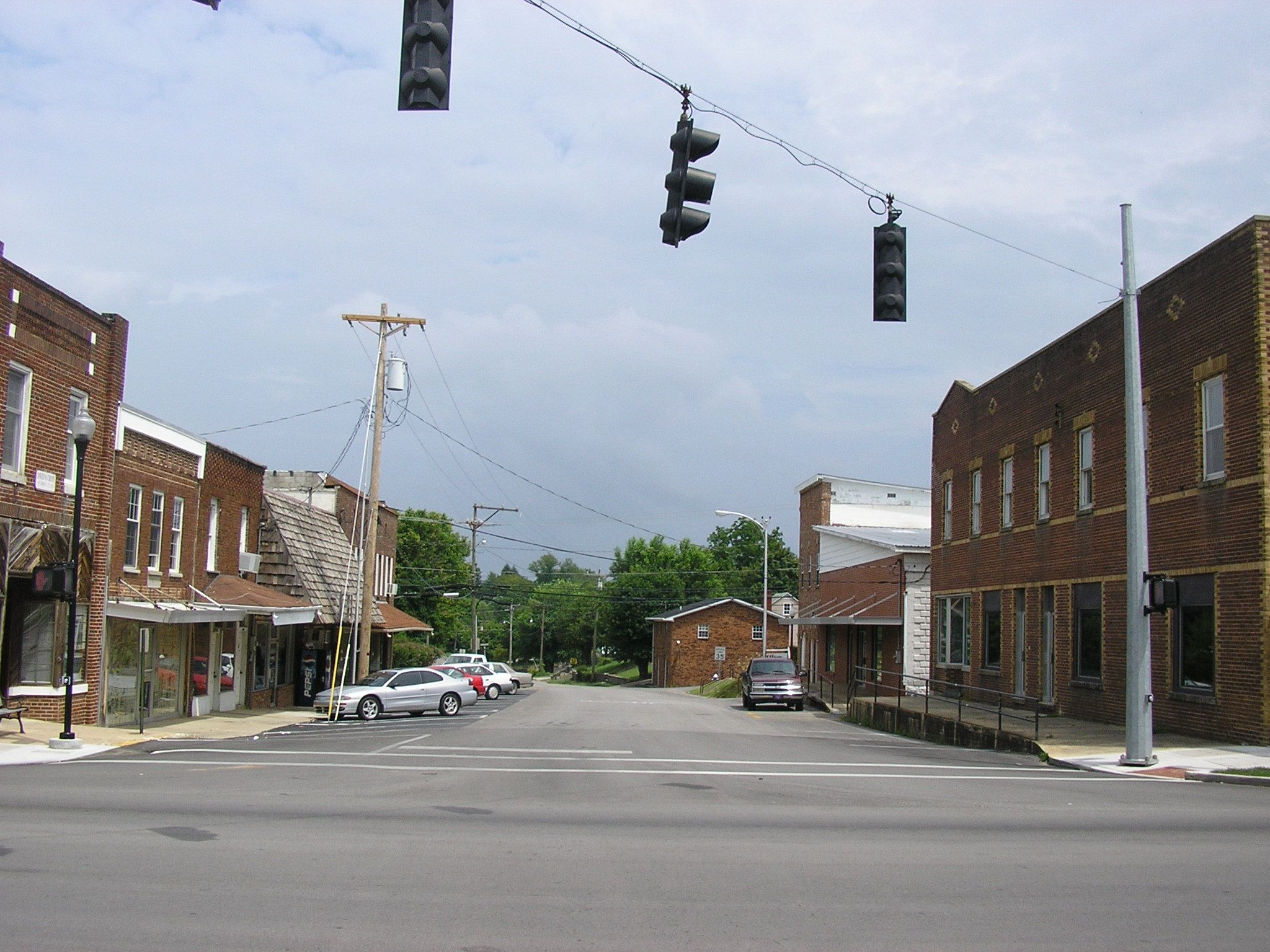
Albany

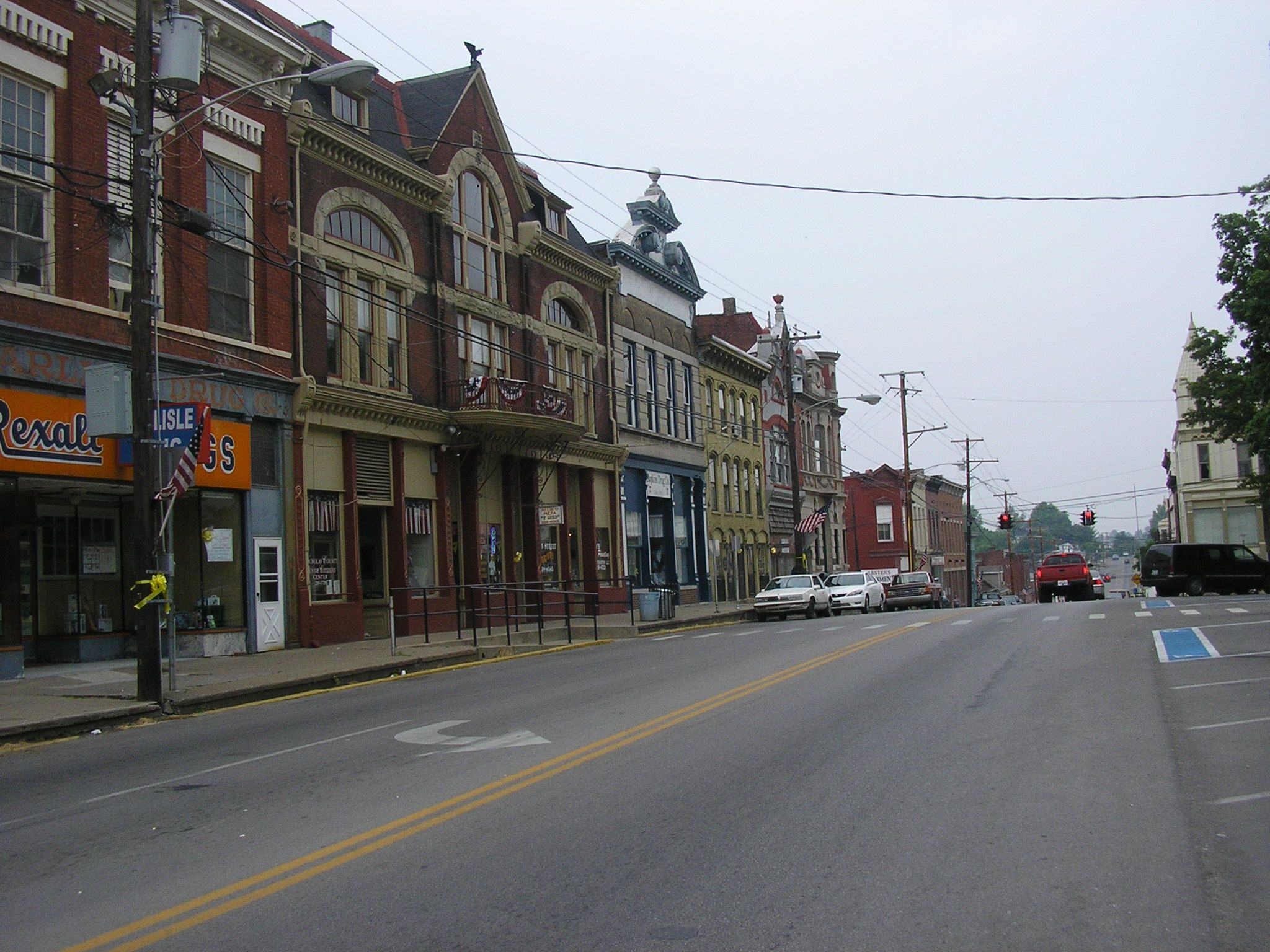
Carlisle

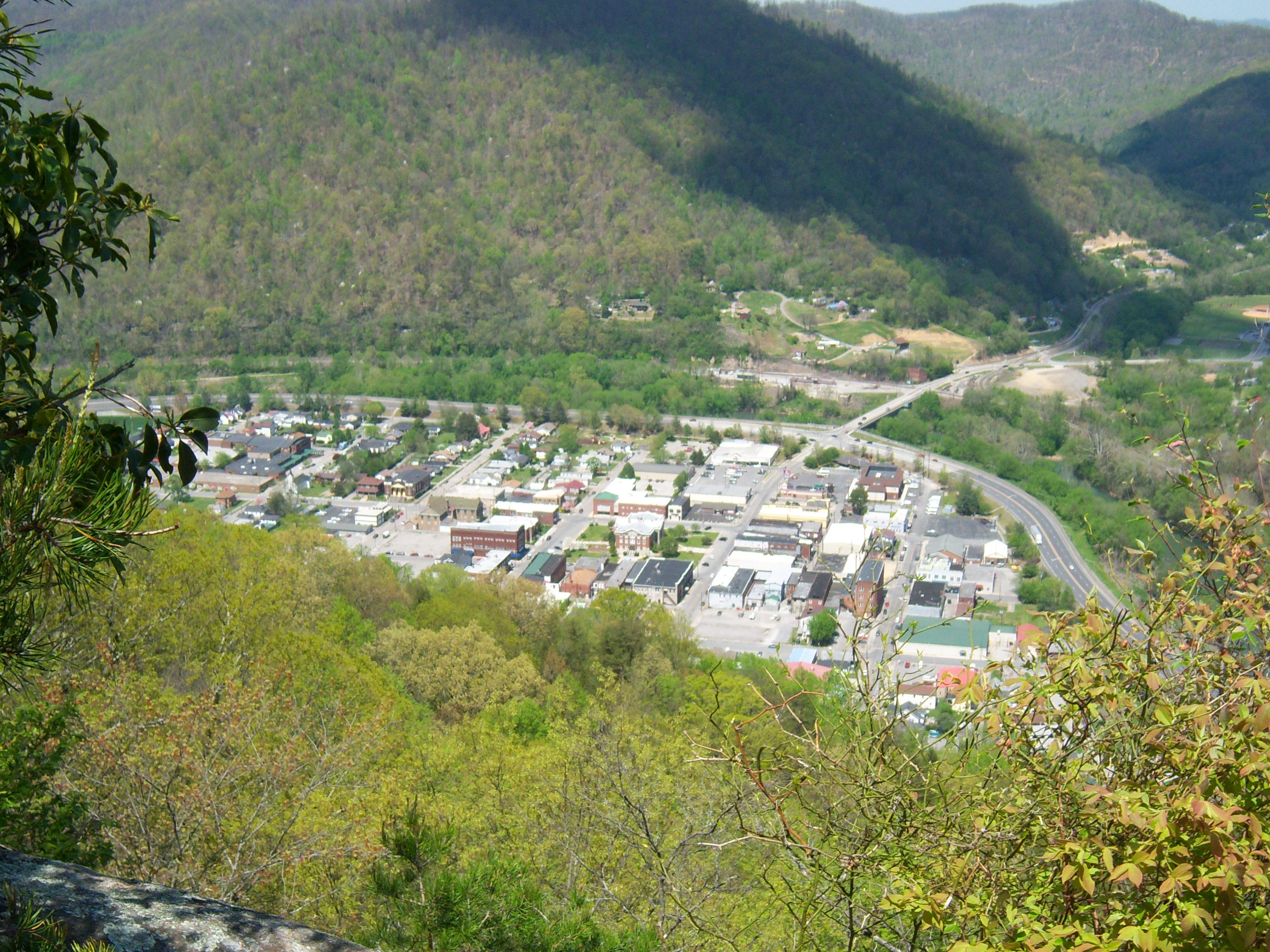
Pineville

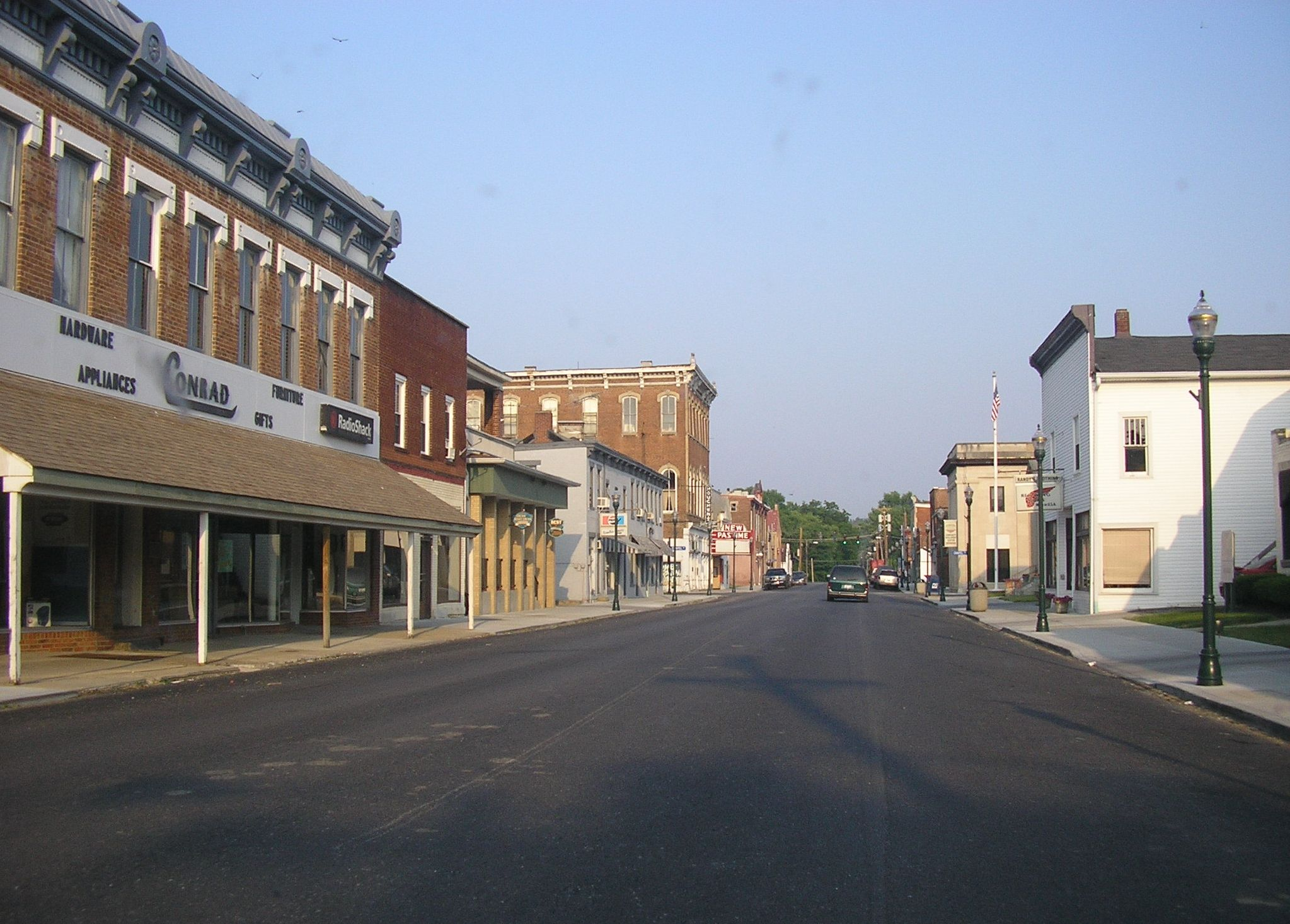
Falmouth

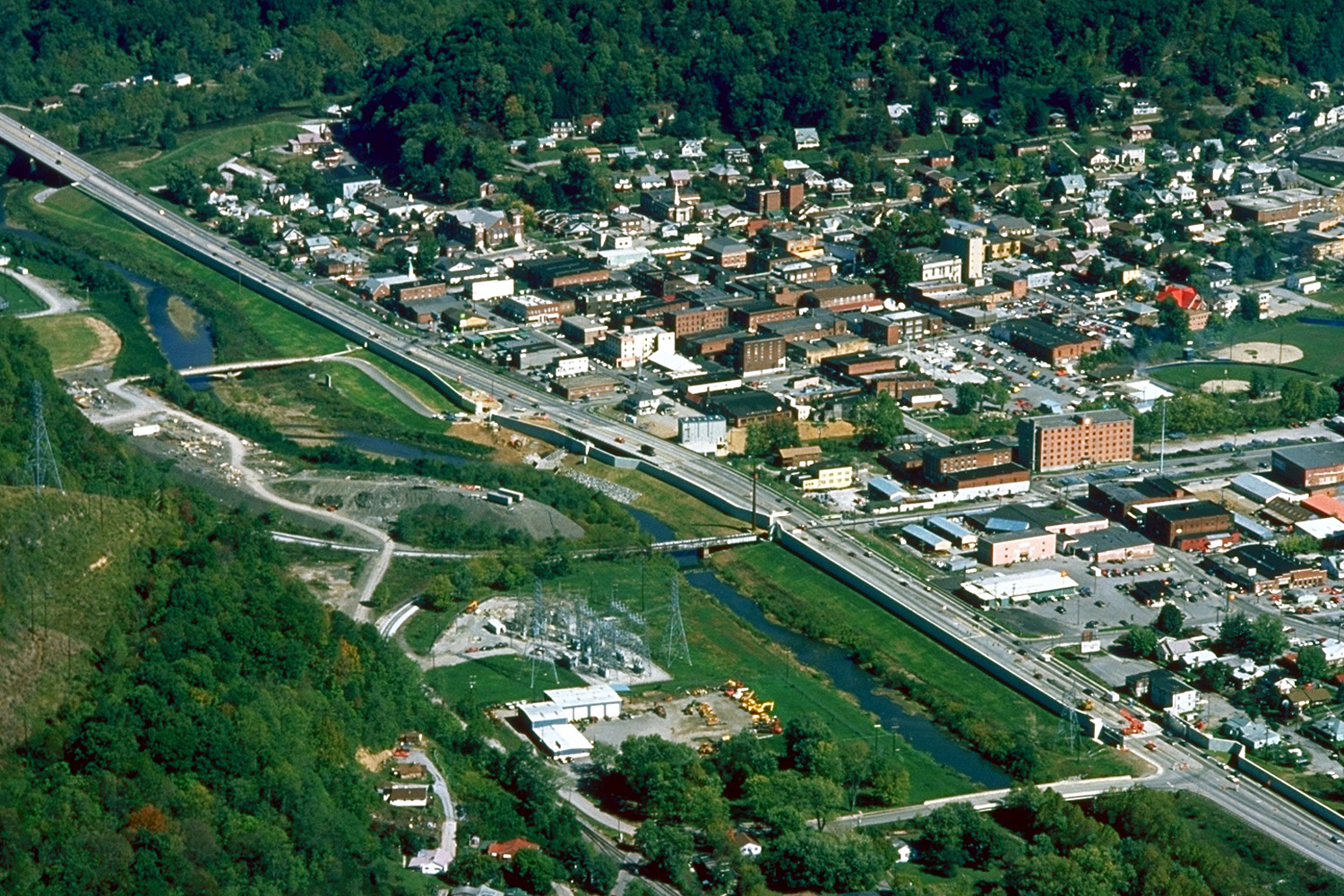
Harlan

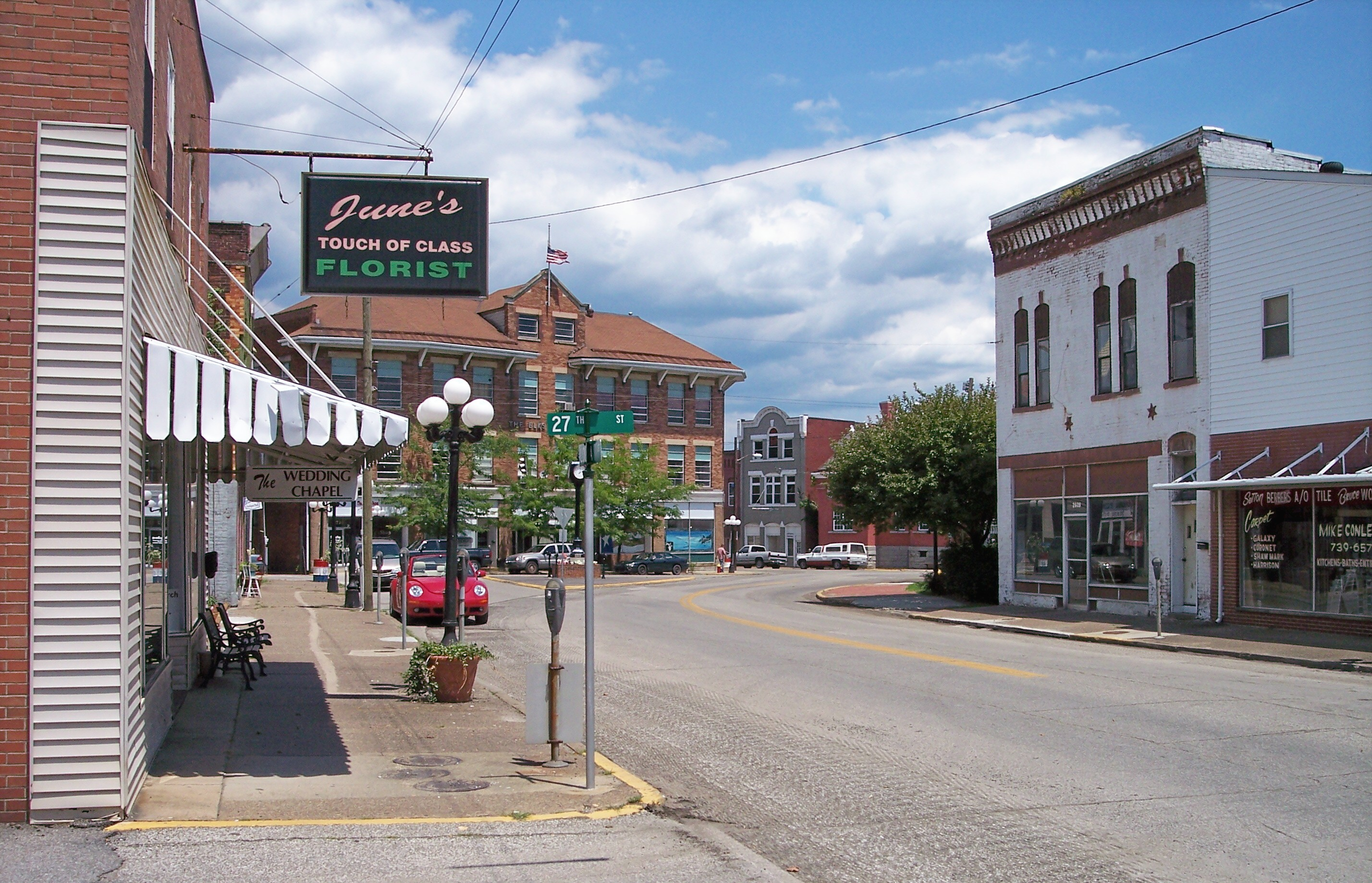
Catlettsburg

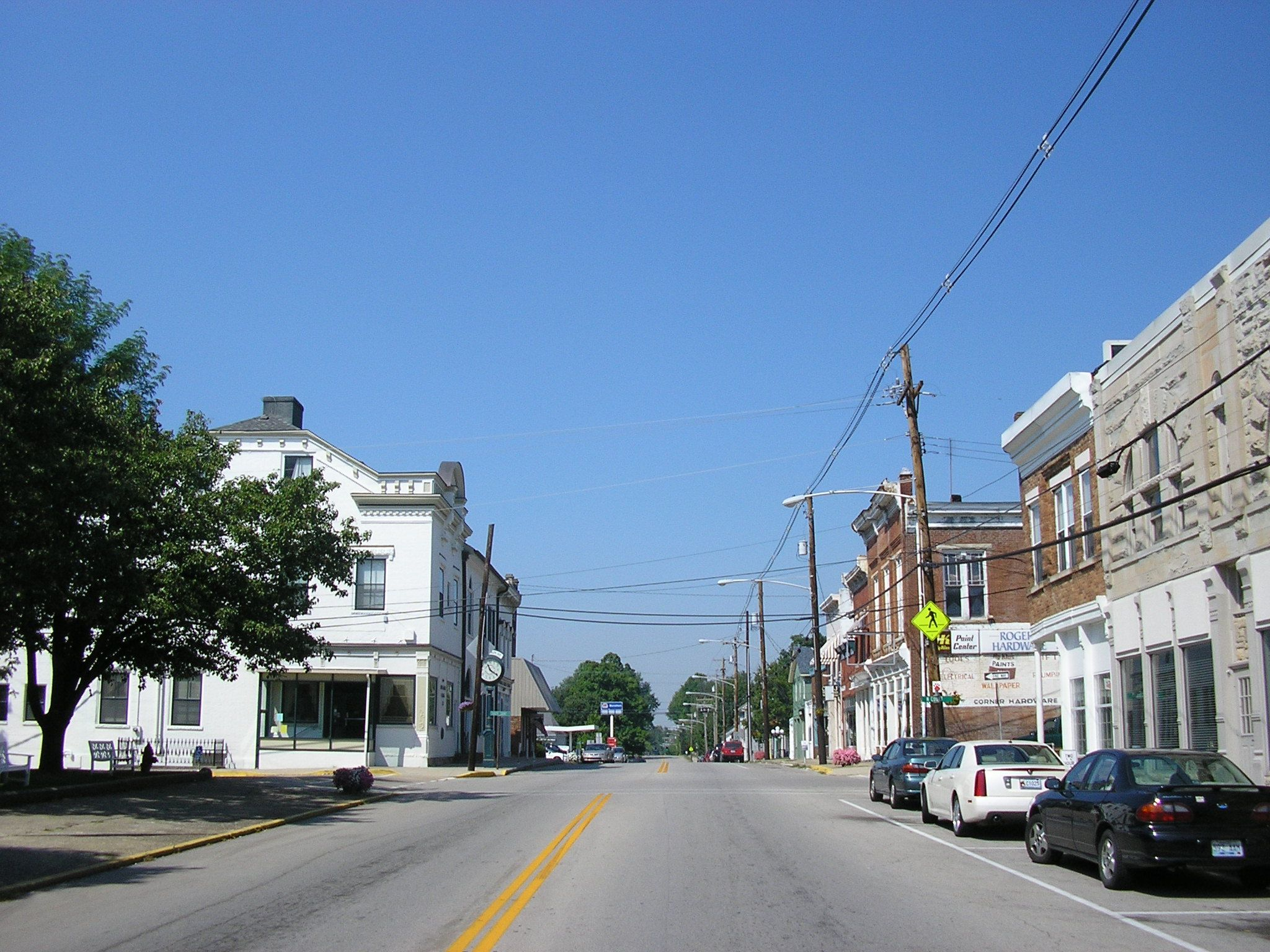
Owingsville

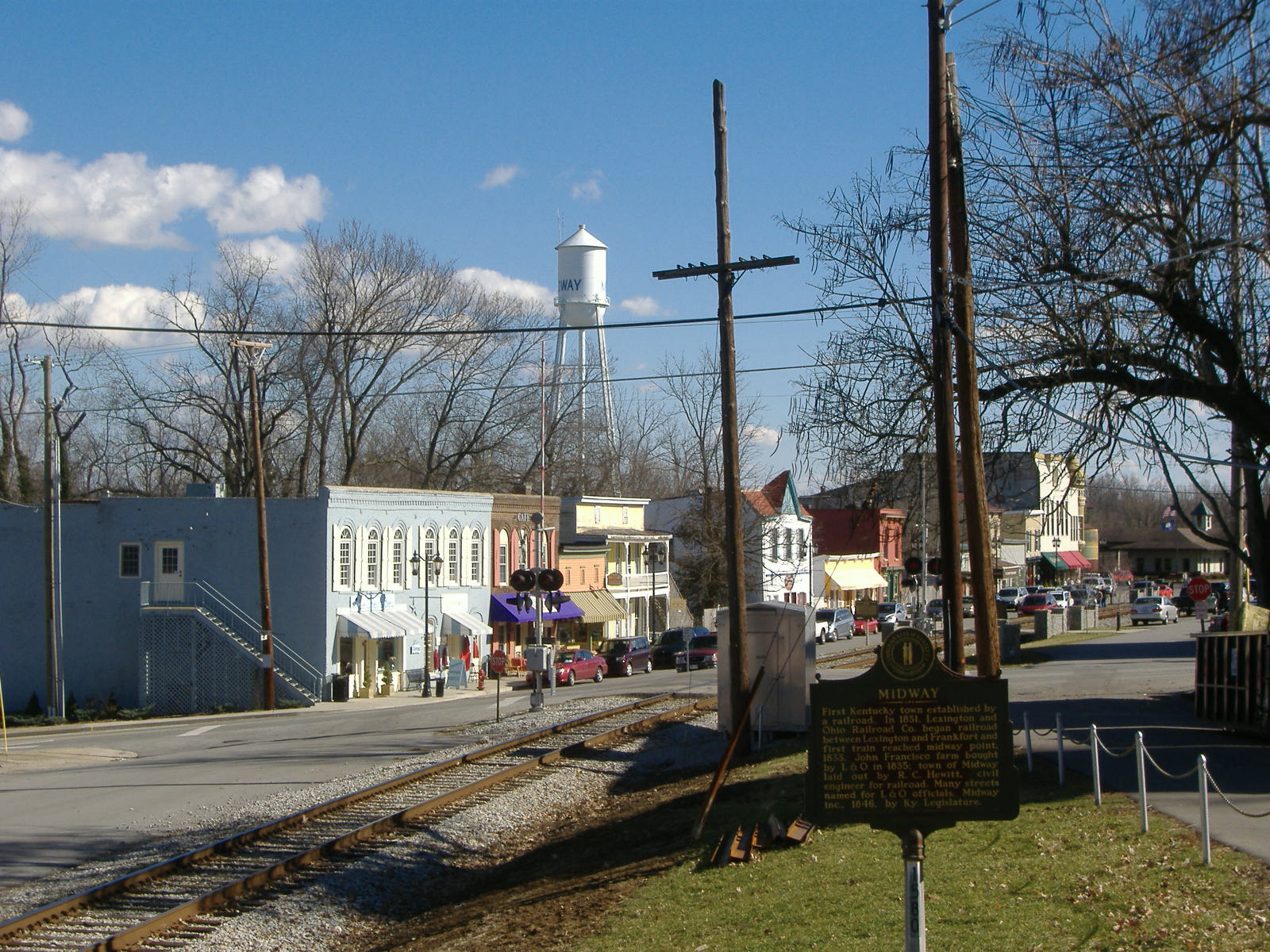
Midway

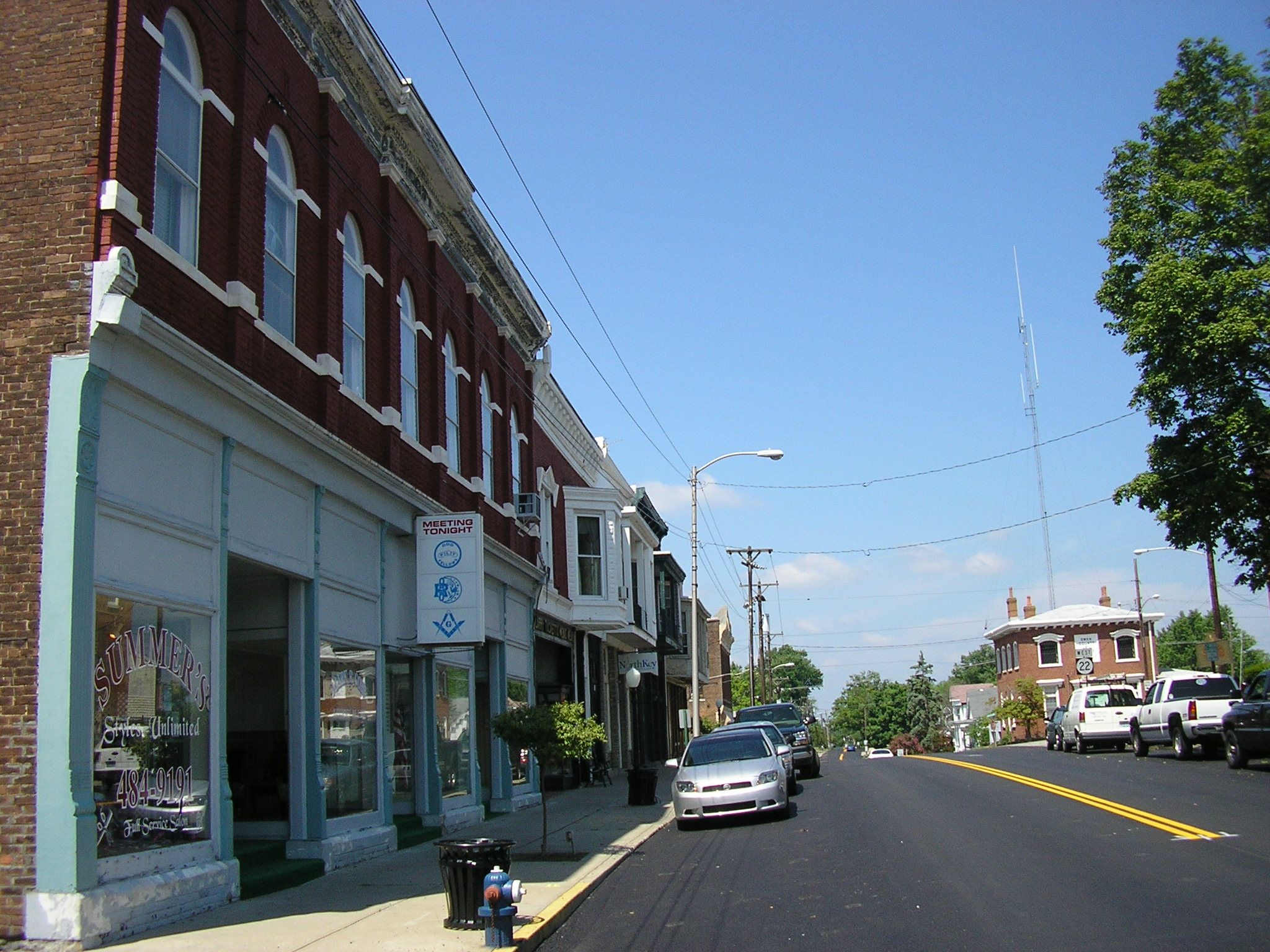
Owenton

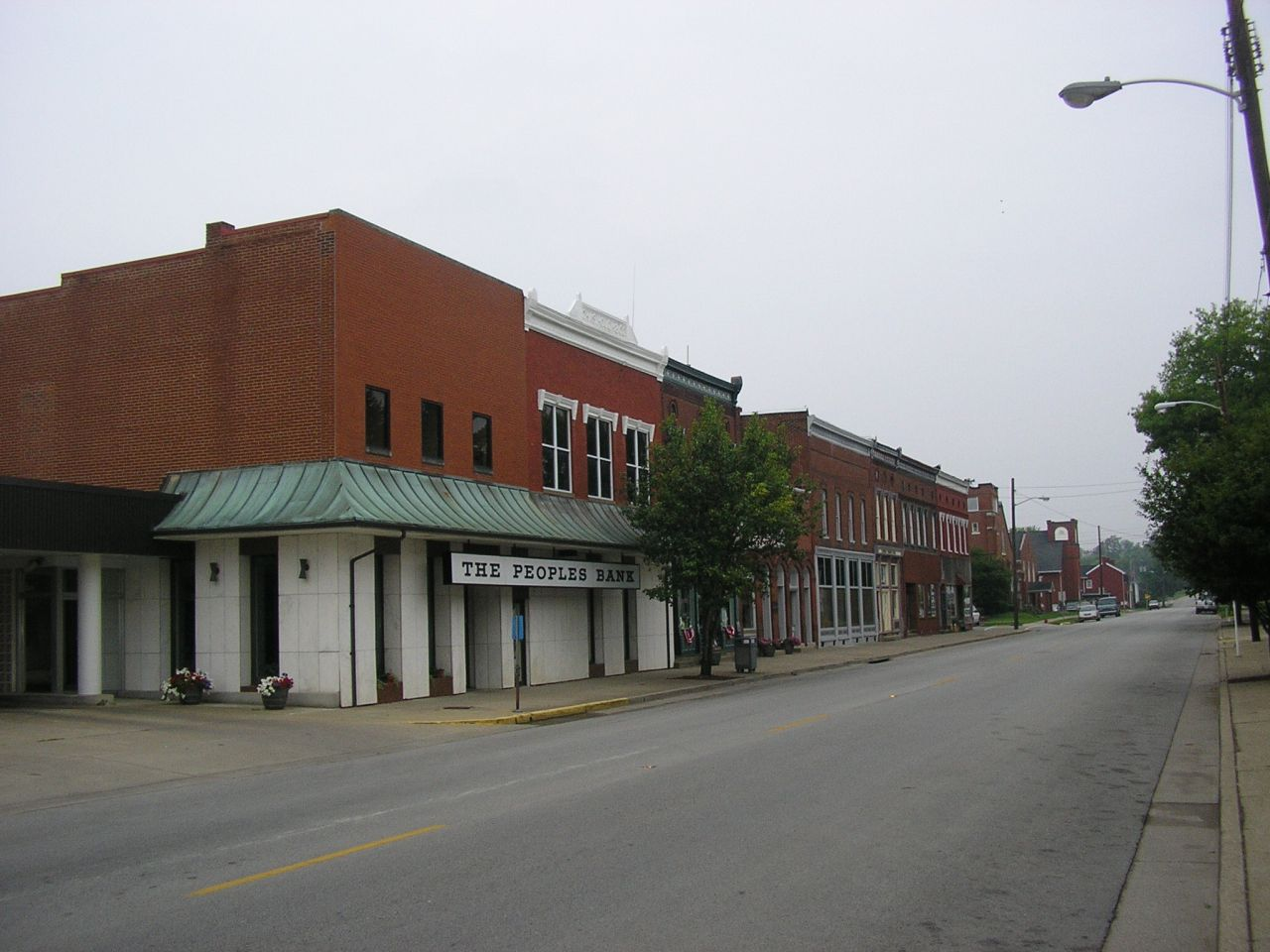
Taylorsville

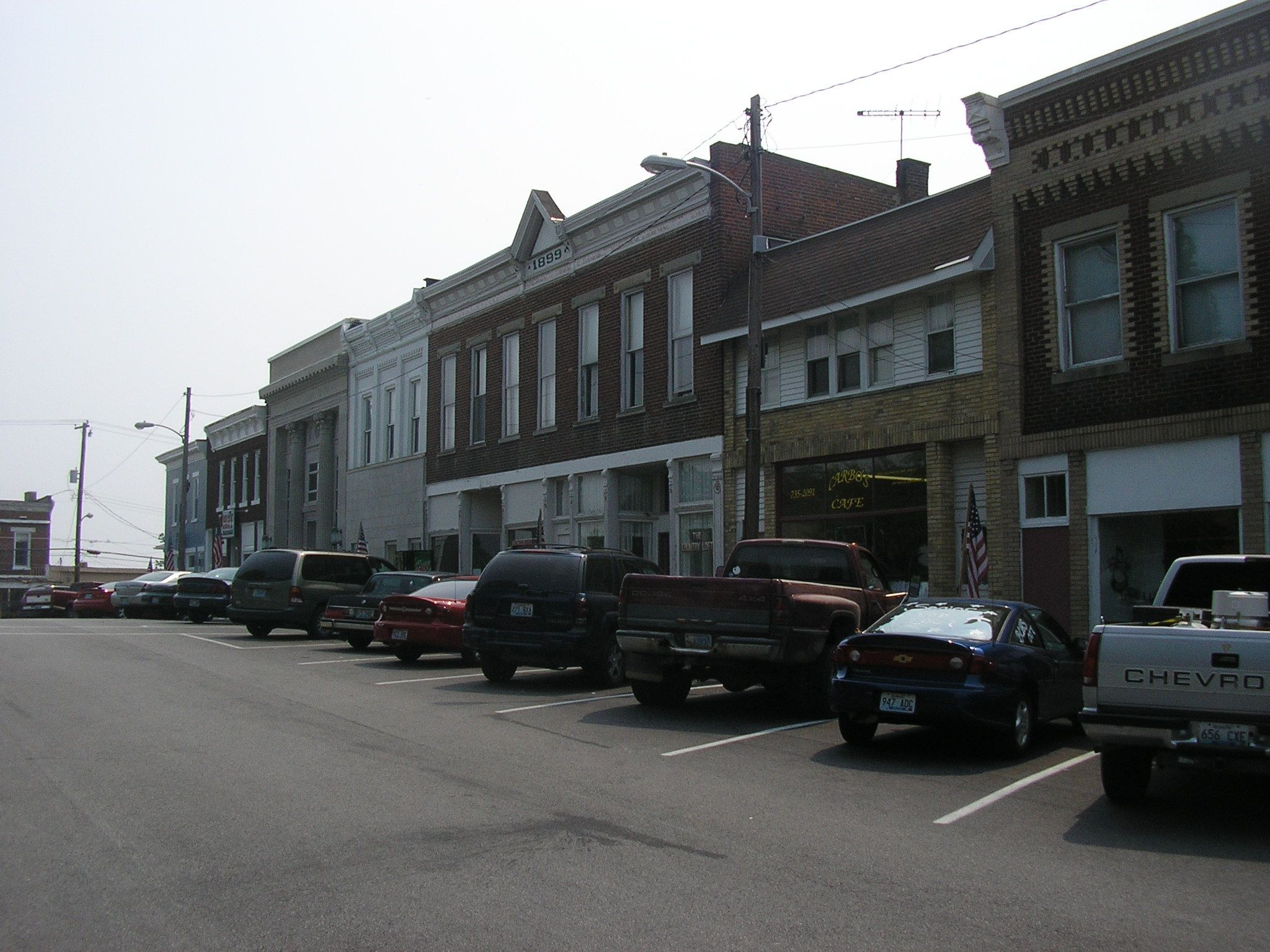
Brooksville

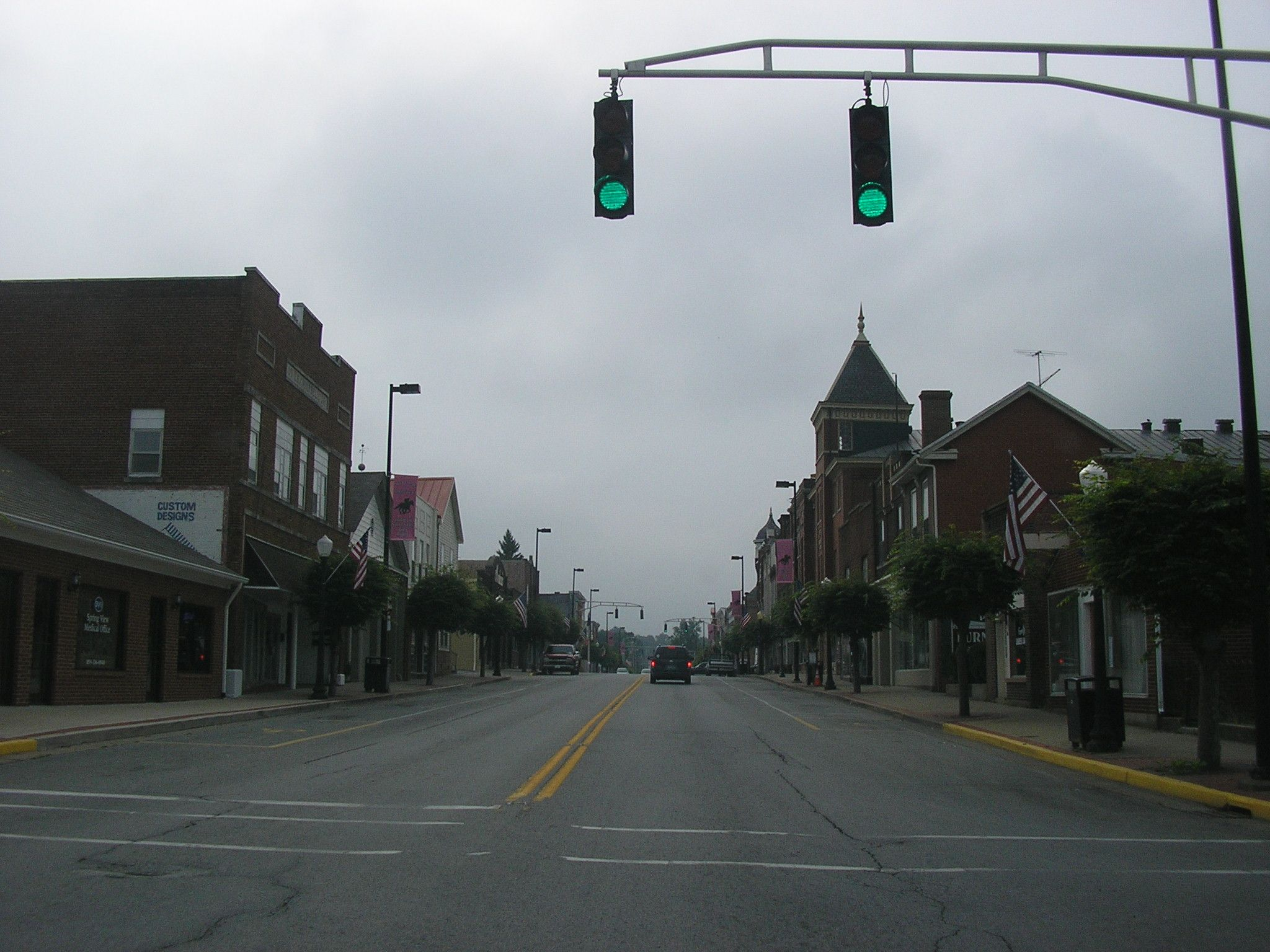
Willisburg

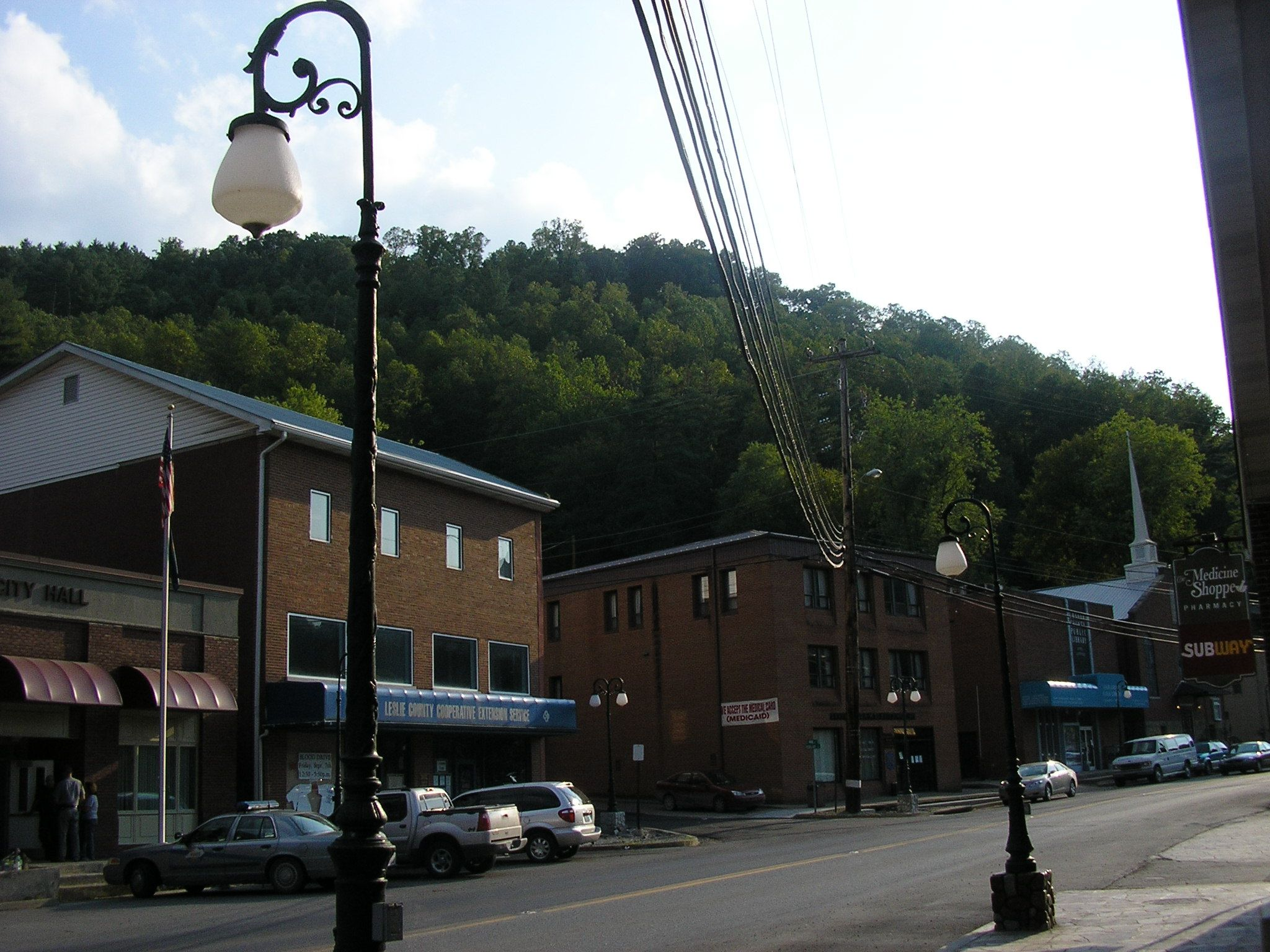
Hyden

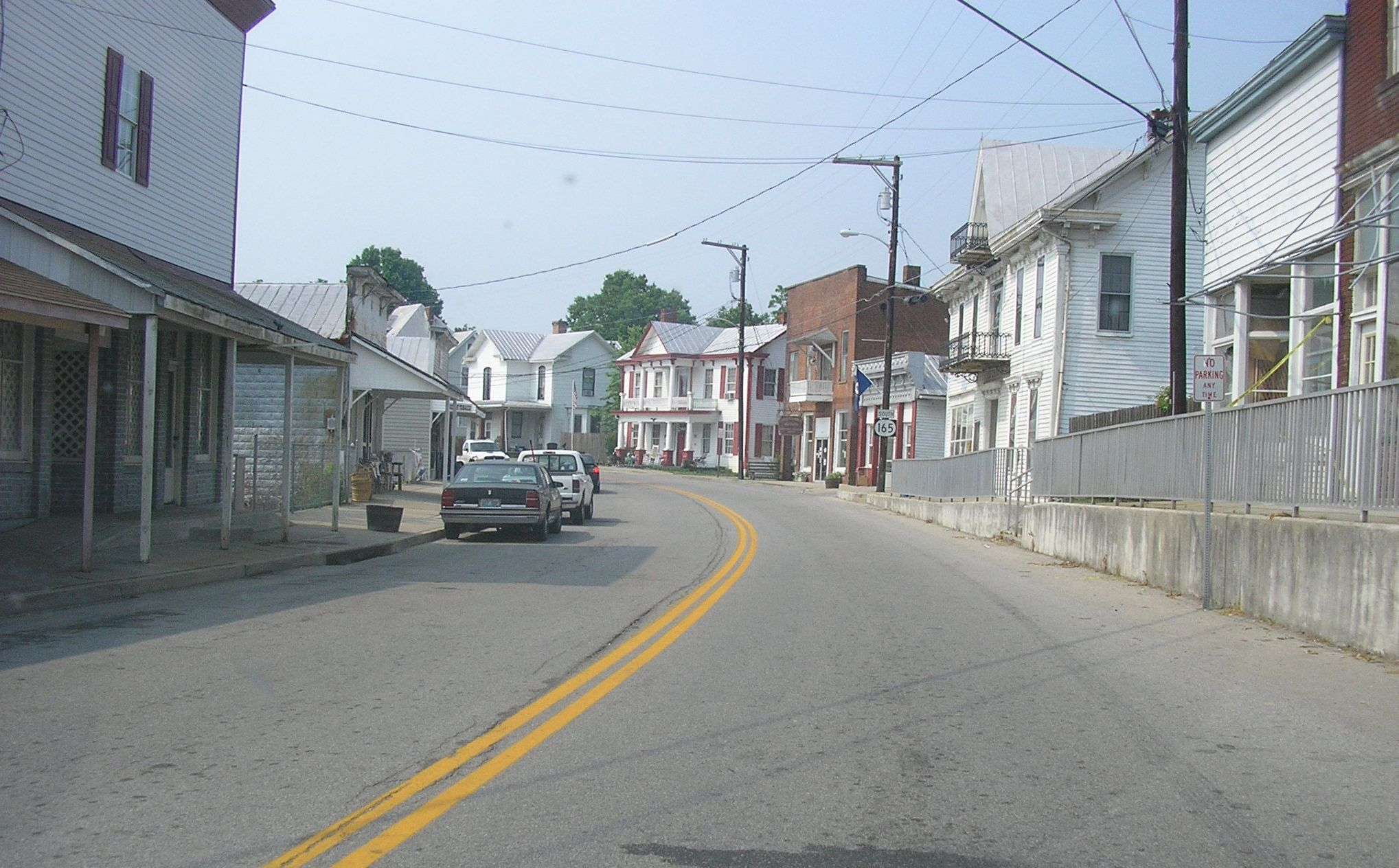
Mount Olivet

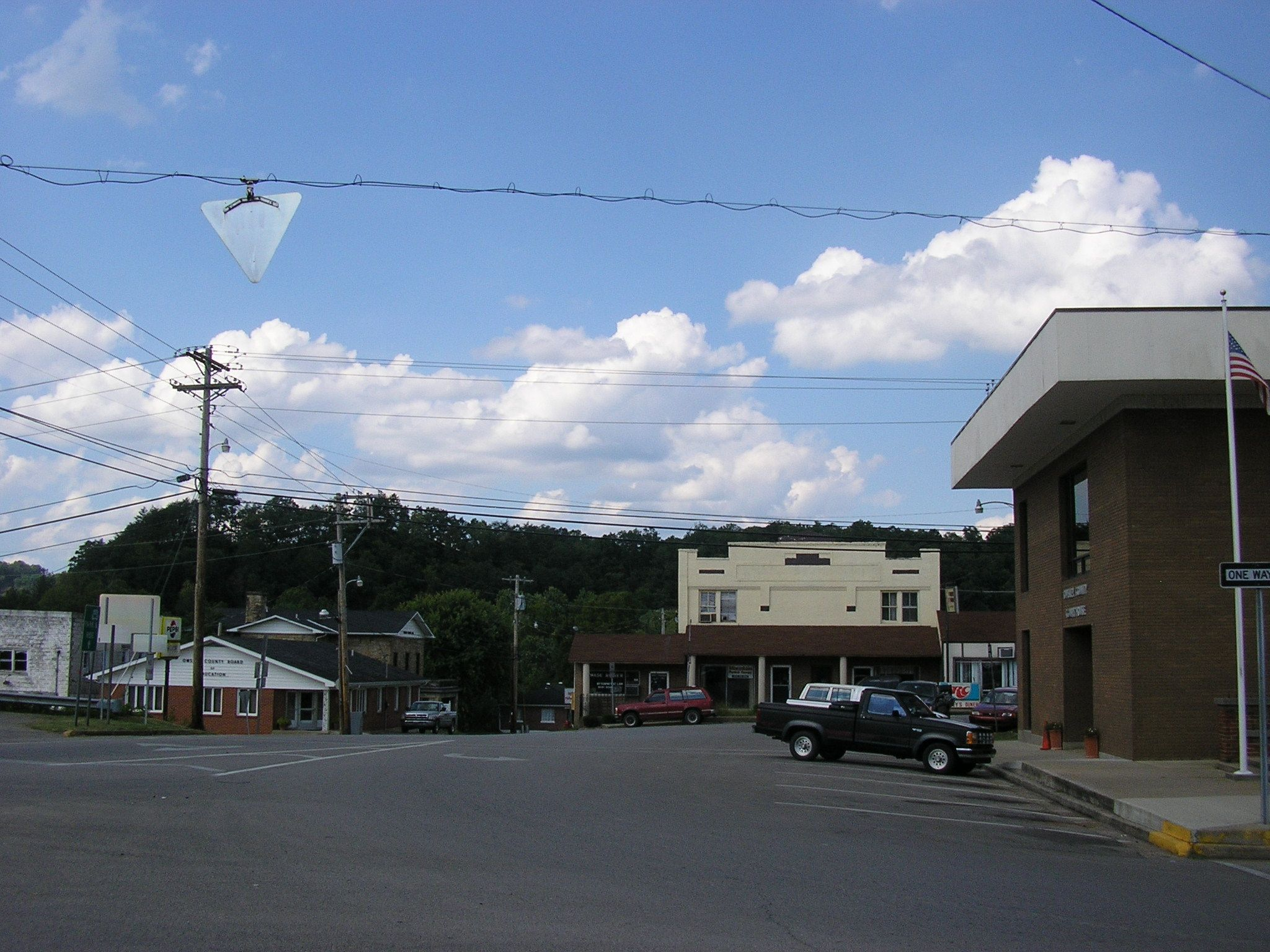
Booneville

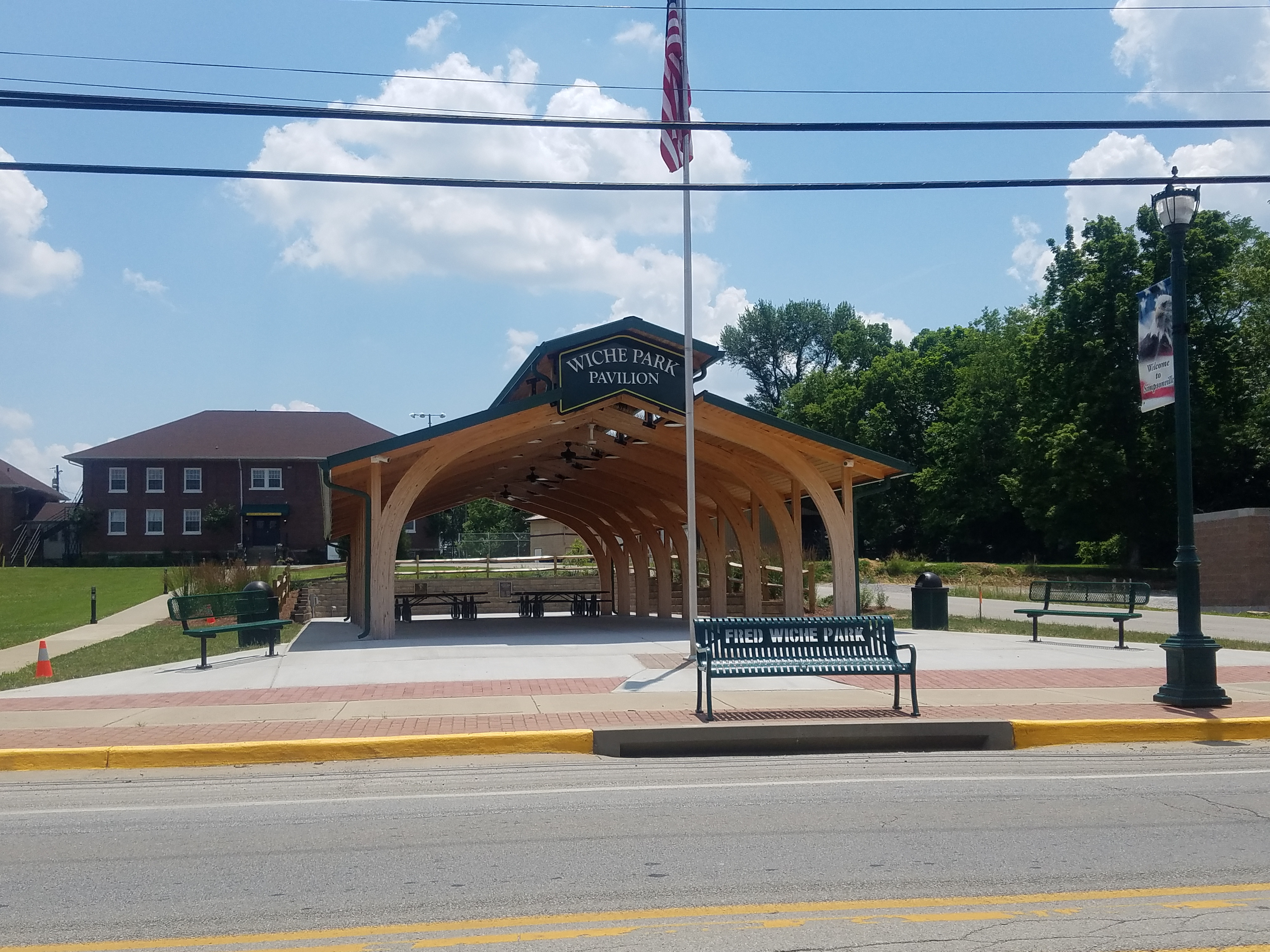
Simpsonville, Kentucky

== See also ==
- Demographics of Kentucky
- Geography of Kentucky
- Kentucky statistical areas
- List of census-designated places in Kentucky
- List of city nicknames in Kentucky
- List of counties in Kentucky
- List of metropolitan areas of Kentucky
