= Neighborhoods in Louisville, Kentucky =

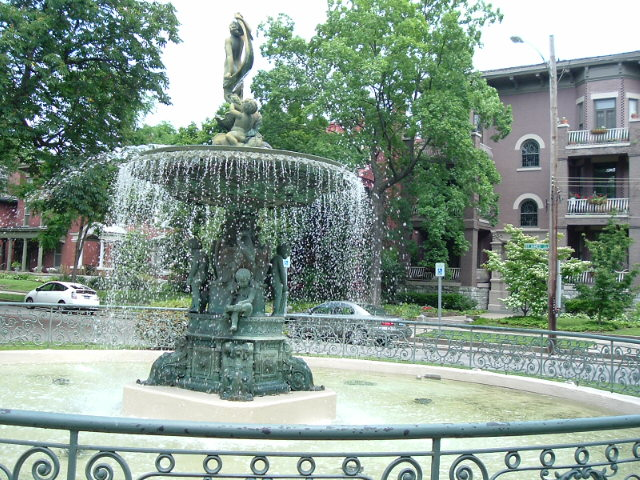
The fountain at St. James Court in Old Louisville

This is a list of official neighborhoods in Louisville, Kentucky. Like many older American cities, Louisville has well-defined neighborhoods, many with well over a century of history as a neighborhood.

The oldest neighborhoods are the riverside areas of Downtown and Portland (initially a separate settlement), representing the early role of the river as the most important form of commerce and transportation. As the city expanded, peripheral neighborhoods like Butchertown, Phoenix Hill, Russell, Shelby Park, Smoketown and others were developed to house and employ the growing population.

The arrival of the streetcar allowed suburbs to be built further out, such as Beechmont, Belknap, Old Louisville, Shawnee, Douglass and the Highlands. An interurban rail line in the early 1900s led to communities east of Louisville such as Anchorage and Glenview becoming year-round homes for the rich. Some of Louisville's very rich also moved to mansions along Alta Vista road, in today's Cherokee-Seneca neighborhood.

== Pre-merger ==
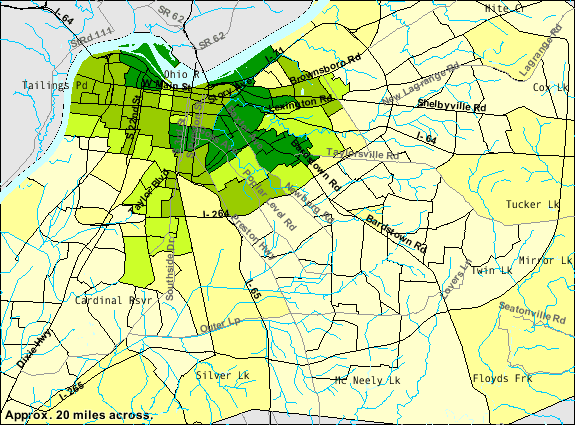
Percentage of housing units built before 1940. Dark green represents a 53% to 83% concentration, and is seen in the Old Louisville, Highlands, Crescent Hill, Portland and Butchertown neighborhoods. A 30% to 52% concentration (pea green) can be found throughout many other areas inside I-264.

1. Algonquin
2. Auburndale
3. Audubon
4. Avondale-Melbourne Heights
5. Bashford Manor
6. Beechmont
7. Belknap
8. Belmar
9. Bon Air
10. Bonnycastle
11. Bradley
12. Brownsboro-Zorn
13. Butchertown
14. California
15. Camp Taylor
16. Cherokee Gardens
17. Cherokee-Seneca
18. Cherokee Triangle
19. Chickasaw
20. Clifton
21. Clifton Heights
22. Cloverleaf
23. Crescent Hill
24. Deer Park
25. Douglass Loop
26. Downtown
27. Edgewood
28. Gardiner Lane
29. Germantown
30. Hallmark
31. Hawthorne
32. Hayfield Dundee
33. Hazelwood
34. Highland Park - Defunct
35. Highlands
36. Hikes Point
37. Irish Hill
38. Iroquois (Bryn Mawr)
39. Iroquois (Kenwood)
40. Iroquois Park
41. Jacobs
42. Kenwood Hill
43. Klondike
44. Limerick
45. Lucky Horseshoe
46. Meriwether
47. NuLu
48. Old Louisville
49. Original Highlands
50. Paristown Pointe
51. Park DuValle
52. Park Hill
53. Parkland
54. Phoenix Hill
55. Poplar Level
56. Portland
57. Prestonia
58. Rockcreek-Lexington Road
59. Russell
60. Saint Joseph
61. Schnitzelburg
62. Shawnee
63. Shelby Park
64. Smoketown
65. SoBro
66. South Louisville
67. Southern Heights
68. Southland Park
69. Southside
70. Standiford - Defunct
71. Taylor-Berry
72. Tyler Park
73. Wilder Park
74. Wyandotte (also called Oakdale)

== Unincorporated places ==
After merger, unincorporated census designated places in Jefferson County were considered by many (local media for example) to have become neighborhoods of Louisville.

Select unincorporated places, most of which were previously considered CDPs (census-designated places), are:

- Buechel
- Fairdale
- Fern Creek
- Highview
- Newburg
- Okolona
- Pleasure Ridge Park
- Saint Dennis (often spelled locally as St. Dennis)
- Valley Station

Other unincorporated places include:

- Ashville (Glenmary)
- Avoca
- Beckley (Lake Forest)
- Beechland Beach
- Berrytown
- Bethany
- Boston (not to be confused with the community of the same name in nearby Nelson County)
- Candlelight
- Cardinal Hill
- Clark Station
- Eastwood
- English Station
- Fairmount
- Fisherville
- Freys Hill (Springhurst)
- Goose Creek
- Greenwood (Riverport)
- Griffytown
- Harrods Creek
- Hunters Trace
- Johnsontown
- Juniper Beach
- Knopp (Knopp-Melton)
- Kosmosdale
- Lake Forest
- Lake Dreamland
- Lake Louisvilla
- Lakeland
- Long Run
- Longview
- Meadowlawn
- Medora
- Norton Commons
- O'Bannon
- Orell
- Parkwood
- Penile
- Petersburg
- Plainview
- Prairie Village
- Riverside Gardens
- Routt
- Rubbertown
- Scottsdale
- Seatonville
- Smyrna
- South Park
- Springdale
- Springhurst
- Sylvania
- Thixton
- Transylvania Beach
- Tucker Station
- Valley Downs
- Valley Gardens
- Valley Village
- Waverly Hills
- Whitner
- Wisertown
- Wolf Creek
- Worthington
- Yorktown

== Incorporated places ==
After merger, incorporated places in Jefferson County became a part of Louisville while retaining their respective small city governments. Most of these small cities are considered neighborhoods of Louisville although the neighborhood boundaries are not necessarily contiguous with the boundaries of the small cities. Listed under St. Matthews are former cities it annexed and thus are now included as its neighborhoods.

- Anchorage
- Audubon Park
- Bancroft
- Barbourmeade
- Beechwood Village
- Bellemeade
- Bellewood
- Blue Ridge Manor
- Briarwood
- Broeck Pointe
- Brownsboro Farm
- Brownsboro Village
- Cambridge
- Coldstream
- Creekside
- Crossgate
- Douglass Hills
- Druid Hills
- Fincastle
- Forest Hills
- Glenview
- Glenview Hills
- Glenview Manor
- Goose Creek
- Graymoor-Devondale
- Green Spring
- Heritage Creek (originally Minor Lane Heights)
- Hickory Hill
- Hills and Dales
- Hollow Creek
- Hollyvilla
- Houston Acres
- Hurstbourne
- Hurstbourne Acres
- Indian Hills
- Jeffersontown
- Kingsley
- Langdon Place
- Lincolnshire
- Lyndon
  - Keeneland
- Lynnview
- Manor Creek
- Maryhill Estates
- Meadowbrook Farm
- Meadow Vale
- Meadowview Estates
- Middletown
- Mockingbird Valley
- Moorland
- Murray Hill
- Norbourne Estates
- Northfield
- Norwood
- Old Brownsboro Place
- Parkway Village
- Plantation
- Poplar Hills
- Prospect
- Richlawn
- Riverwood
- Rolling Fields
- Rolling Hills
- St. Matthews
  - Broad Fields
  - Cherrywood Village
  - Fairmeade
  - Plymouth Village
  - Springlee
  - Warwick Village
- St. Regis Park
- Seneca Gardens
- Shively
- Spring Mill
- Spring Valley
- Strathmoor Manor
- Strathmoor Village
- Sycamore
- Ten Broeck
- Thornhill
- Watterson Park
- Wellington
- West Buechel
- Westwood
- Whipps Millgate
- Wildwood
- Windy Hills
- Woodland Hills
- Woodlawn Park
- Worthington Hills

== Designated as neighborhoods ==
Some attractions and areas in Louisville are officially designated as neighborhoods.

- Bowman Field
- Fairgrounds
- University of Louisville (Belknap Campus)

== Historic neighborhoods ==
- Standiford: Bordered Interstate 65 to the east and the Louisville Muhammad Ali International Airport (formerly Standiford Field) to the north, west and south. It was displaced by the expansion of the airport, and it is currently the site for Louisville Air National Guard Base, which was relocated to make room for an expansion of the UPS WorldPort.

== See also ==
- Cityscape of Louisville, Kentucky
- Geography of Louisville, Kentucky
- List of parks in the Louisville metropolitan area
