= Cherrywood (disambiguation) =

Cherrywood, Dublin is a business park and suburb of Dublin.

Cherrywood or similar terms may also refer to:

- The wood of a cherry tree
- Cherrywood Elementary School in the Berryessa Union School District of California
- Cherrywood, an electoral ward in Farnborough, Hampshire, England
- Cherrywood Village, St. Matthews, Kentucky, United States, a neighborhood
- Cherry Wood, a nature reserve in London
