= Wolf Creek, Louisville =

Neighborhood in Louisville, Kentucky

Coordinates: 38°18′57″N 85°36′20″W

Wolf Creek is a neighborhood in far eastern Jefferson County, Kentucky, United States. Located directly east of Louisville along the Ohio River, Wolf Creek is bordered by Harrods Creek, Green Spring and Little Goose Creek. Its zip code is 40241. The neighborhood is quietly nestled amongst rolling hills and features heavy tree density, many small tributaries and natural wildlife.

== Early history ==
The area of Wolf Creek was once working farms and a few country estates until development occurred in the early 1990s.
