= Warwick Village, St. Matthews, Kentucky =

Warwick Village
- Subdivision
- Location within the state of Kentucky
- Coordinates: 38°15′30.031″N 85°37′1.372″W
- Country: United States
- State: Kentucky
- County: Jefferson
- Elevation: 538 ft (164 m)
- Time zone: UTC-5 (Eastern (EST))
  - Summer (DST): UTC-4 (EDT)
- Postal code: 40222
- Area code: 502

Warwick Village is a neighborhood located in Louisville, Kentucky. Warwick Village is just outside the Watterson Expressway and part of the City of St. Matthews, Its boundaries are roughly New La Grange Rd, Washburn Ave, and Columbia Ave. Many of Warwick Village's streets are surrounded by Warwick Park also known as Warwick-Villa Park Playground.

Warwick Village is also known through history as Warwick Villa, Warwich Villa, Warwick and Warrick Village.

== Geography ==
Warwick Village is located at 38°15′26.186″N 85°36′58.365″W (38.25995, -85.61764).

== History ==
Warwick Villa Subdivision was claimed to be the first subdivision in Kentucky. Warwick Village extends from LaGrange Road, running back Washburn Avenue, across the L. & N. Railroad tracks, including now what is known as Fountain Avenue.

Before the turn of the century, with the train stop linking west Lyndon to Louisville, George R. Washburn tried to develop his 50 acres near the tracks into Warwick Villa -- "the beautiful little suburb on the high tide of prosperity." But the panic of 1893 caused financial problems and few houses were built. George R. Washburn enlisted a developer by the name of Colonel Hunter to build Warwick Village on the land mostly owned by the Washburn family. It failed to grow much for at that time, it was too far removed from the city. Before the interurban started, the railroad, running parallel to the Vine Crest Avenue, was the only means of transportation to Louisville. It is said that a path of octagonal stones of different color extended from Warwick Villa all the way to LaGrange Road.

Washburn sold the original lots just west of Lyndon in 1928 to Henry Holzheimer Sr., who successfully developed a Warwick Villa subdivision in St. Matthews. The property had been in the Washburn family since 1815, according to county historic records. The two-story framed Washburn House, built in the 1830s, is still on Fountain Avenue, surrounded by newer homes.

Warwick Villa Hotel was located near Washburn Avenue and fronted the railroad tracks. The hotel had social prominence into the 1900s as a summer hotel. People came from Louisville and other points in Kentucky by train, to enjoy the country air and the delicious meals for which the hotel was famous. The frame hotel contained 20 rooms and according to Mr. Fred Boss, it was destroyed by fire and not rebuilt. Across the road from the Warwick Villa interurban station on LaGrange Road located the Indian Mineral Wells, operated by Colonel Harris, who sold and distributed mineral water into the late 1940s. Another mineral well with pump was located in the front yard of the Robinson's grocery at the corner of Lyndon Lane and Vine Crest Avenue, next to the railroad. LaGrange Road was also known as Zimmerman Lane and the grave marker of one of the family was familiar to residents of this area. It was in a curve of the road adjoining the Mineral Wells site. The stone was knocked down and destroyed and the remains were removed and buried elsewhere when LaGrange Road was made a 4-Lane Highway.

== Demographics ==
There are roughly 350 households in Warwick Village.

== Real estate ==
Warwick Village is known for its attractive, charming 1 1/2-story Cape Cod homes. St Matthews, along with Warwick Village are made of smaller, single family, cottage-like houses on tree-lined streets full of character and quirks. Homes in the village for sale can range in price from $115,000 to $260,000, with an average size of homes running 650 to 1800 sq. ft.

== Warwick Park ==
Rededicated in May 2007 after an extensive upgrade, this 8.4 acre park offers amenities such as treed picnic areas, a large pavilion, basketball courts, two baseball diamonds, grills, water fountains, and Port-A-Pot restrooms are on site. There is an asphalt walking track around the perimeter of the park making 2.3 laps equal to one mile, and an up-to-date play area recommended for children 4–12 years with swing and bench seating for adults. The center of the park is an open space suitable for flying kites, tossing discs or as utilized during the spring and fall seasons for numerous soccer practices and games by local schools and athletic groups. A walk in only entrance is located off Virginia Avenue along with free parking areas available at the entrances off of Columbia, Kentucky and Washburn Avenue. Warwick Park is designed to be enjoyed by all aged groups, the pavilion and baseball diamond can be reserved at no cost.
