= Meadowlawn =

Meadowlawn may refer to:

- Meadowlawn, Louisville, a neighborhood in Louisville, Kentucky
- Meadowlawn Plantation, a former plantation house in Lowdnesboro, Alabama
