= Valley Gardens (disambiguation) =

Valley Gardens is a botanical garden in Surrey, England.

Valley Gardens may also refer to:

- Valley Gardens and South Cliff Gardens, a park in North Yorkshire, England
- Valley Gardens, Harrogate, a park and garden in North Yorkshire, England
- Valley Gardens, Louisville, Kentucky, United States, a neighborhood
- Valley Gardens Middle School, Whitley Bay, North Tyneside, United Kingdom
- Valley Gardens, Pontefract, a park and gardens in West Yorkshire, England
- Valley Gardens (album), an album by the band Wally
