= Seatonville =

Seatonville may refer to:

- Seatonville, Illinois
- Seatonville, Louisville, Kentucky
