= Avondale-Melbourne Heights, Louisville =

Neighborhood in Louisville, Kentucky

Coordinates: 38°13′14″N 85°38′22″W

Avondale-Melbourne Heights is a neighborhood in Louisville, Kentucky, United States. Its boundaries are Breckenridge Lane on the east, Hikes Lane to the south, Furman Boulevard to the west, and the Watterson Expressway on the north. The sixth-class city of Meadowview Estates is excluded.
