= O'Bannon, Louisville =

Neighborhood in Louisville, Kentucky

Coordinates: 38°17′23″N 85°30′57″W

O'Bannon is a neighborhood of Louisville, Kentucky in extreme northeast Jefferson County centered along Old LaGrange Road and Collins Lane (which is named after Levi Collins). O'Bannon was originally called Williamson after its first postmaster John Williamson, but was renamed in 1859 after postmaster John O'Bannon. The Post Office was located at the southwest corner of Old LaGrange Road and Collins Lane. O'Bannon Elementary School, which was located on Factory Lane, closed in 1960.

In 2026, the O’Bannon area expanded and runs down LaGrange Road to the southwestern Oldham County line.

O’Bannon is home to many smaller neighborhoods that make up the larger neighborhood. Some of these smaller neighborhood-subdivisions include but are not limited to, Forest Springs and Oliver Station Court. The population has steadily been the same with a slight increase over the years, moving from ~450 people in 2010, to ~500 people in 2026.
