= Penile, Louisville =

Penile
- Louisville neighborhood
- Location within the state of Kentucky
- Coordinates: 38°6′25″N 85°48′17″W
- Country: United States
- State: Kentucky
- City: Louisville
- Elevation: 453 ft (138 m)
- Time zone: UTC-5 (Eastern (EST))
  - Summer (DST): UTC-4 (EDT)
- GNIS feature ID: 508800

Penile (/pəˈniəl/) is a historic community located in Jefferson County, Kentucky, United States. Formerly an unincorporated community, it was designated a neighborhood of Louisville, Kentucky, when the city of Louisville merged with Jefferson County in 2003.
