= Prairie Village, Louisville =

Neighborhood in Louisville, Kentucky

Coordinates: 38°6′45″N 85°50′12″W

Prairie Village is a neighborhood of Louisville, Kentucky, composed of a series of subdivisions and farms centered on the intersection of Third Street Road, Valley Station Road, and Stonestreet Road.

== Economy and real estate ==
The median value of Prairie Village real estate is currently around $125,000-$300,000. The average household income is around $78,255. The average age of homes in the area is 36 years, although this varies widely. Historic homes are intermixed with subdivided developments from the last 30 years. There are many sections of Valley Station known as Prairie Hills, Prairie Village Estates, and the Original Prairie Village. The amount of subdivisions in Valley Station is numerous.

Job growth in the area is estimated at over seven percent through 2010.

=== Healthcare ===
Jewish and Saint Mary's Hospital Southwest, a regional hospital and healthcare facility, is located in Prairie Village. This campus also includes physicians offices and lab services. This facility also serves as an emergency care center serving the Southwest Jefferson County, Bullitt County, and Hardin County Areas.

Medical Specialties Represented on this campus include cardiologists, family practitioners, gynecologists, gastroenterologists, internal medicine physicians, oncologists, podiatrists and urologists.

=== Education ===
Two public schools are located near the Prairie Village neighborhood, Stonestreet Elementary and Stuart Middle School, which is the largest middle school in Jefferson County and the state of Kentucky. The high schools for the area are Doss, PRP, and Valley High Schools.

The campus of Jefferson Community and Technical College Southwest is also located near the Prairie Village neighborhood. This campus offers standalone programs for AA degrees in varying field including nursing which utilizes the adjacent Jewish and Saint Mary's Hospital Southwest Campus.

== Religion ==
Prairie Village is near several churches. Churches closest to the neighborhood include the Community of Christ, Life Church Louisville and The Louisville Dream Center, and Virginia Avenue United Methodist Church. Valley View Church a megachurch is located on Old Third Street Road. Just outside the Prairie Village subdivision is the Valley Station Campus of Highview Baptist Church which is a multi-campus megachurch.

== Baseball ==
Prairie Village is also home of a large Babe Ruth / Cal Ripken Program. Prairie Village Baseball has been in the neighborhood for over 40 years located behind Stonestreet Elementary School. Some of its players have gone on to play for past State Baseball Champion PRP High School's team. They offer T-Ball, Baseball, and Softball, and are co-ed.
