= Plymouth Village, St. Matthews, Kentucky =

Neighborhood in St. Matthews, Jefferson County, Kentucky

Plymouth Village
- St. Matthews neighborhood
- Location within the state of Kentucky
- Coordinates: 38°14′23″N 85°39′3″W
- Country: United States
- State: Kentucky
- City: St. Matthews

Area
  - Total: 0.039 sq mi (0.1 km^{2})
  - Land: 0.039 sq mi (0.1 km^{2})
  - Water: 0 sq mi (0.0 km^{2})
- Elevation: 541 ft (165 m)

Population (2000)
  - Total: 201
  - Density: 5,951/sq mi (2,297.6/km^{2})
- Time zone: UTC-5 (Eastern (EST))
  - Summer (DST): UTC-4 (EDT)
- FIPS code: 21-61914
- GNIS feature ID: 0500982

Plymouth Village is a neighborhood of St. Matthews, Kentucky a city in Jefferson County, Kentucky, United States. The population was 201 at the 2000 census.

== History ==
Plymouth Village was incorporated as a city on September 17, 1956. Until 2000 Plymouth Village was an independent Sixth Class city.

== Geography ==
Plymouth Village is located at 38°14′23″N 85°39′3″W (38.239770, -85.650708).

According to the United States Census Bureau, the city has a total area of 0.0 square miles (0.1 km^{2}), all of it land.

== Demographics ==
At the 2000 census there were 201 people in 105 households, including 51 families, in the city. The population density was 5,950.8 inhabitants per square mile (2,297.6/km^{2}). There were 111 housing units at an average density of 3,286.3 per square mile (1,268.8/km^{2}). The racial makeup of the city was 97.01% White, 0.50% from other races, and 2.49% from two or more races. Hispanic or Latino of any race were 2.99%.

Of the 105 households 20.0% had children under the age of 18 living with them, 33.3% were married couples living together, 13.3% had a female householder with no husband present, and 51.4% were non-families. 46.7% of households were one person and 31.4% were one person aged 65 or older. The average household size was 1.91 and the average family size was 2.67.

The age distribution was 19.4% under the age of 18, 4.0% from 18 to 24, 25.4% from 25 to 44, 16.9% from 45 to 64, and 34.3% 65 or older. The median age was 46 years. For every 100 females, there were 76.3 males. For every 100 females age 18 and over, there were 63.6 males.

The median household income was $41,750 and the median family income was $59,375. Males had a median income of $60,000 versus $40,000 for females. The per capita income for the city was $25,319. About 9.3% of families and 5.3% of the population were below the poverty line, including 9.8% of those under the age of eighteen and none of those sixty five or over.
