= Lakeland, Louisville =

Neighborhood in Louisville, Kentucky

Coordinates: 38°16′29″N 85°33′11″W

Lakeland is a neighborhood of Louisville, Kentucky, located along LaGrange Road near Central State Hospital and Keeneland, Lyndon, Kentucky.
