= Springlee, St. Matthews, Kentucky =

Springlee, Kentucky
- St. Matthews neighborhood
- Location within the state of Kentucky
- Coordinates: 38°14′28″N 85°38′32″W
- Country: United States
- State: Kentucky
- City: St. Matthews

Area
  - Total: 0.077 sq mi (0.2 km^{2})
  - Land: 0.077 sq mi (0.2 km^{2})
  - Water: 0 sq mi (0.0 km^{2})
- Elevation: 531 ft (162 m)

Population (2000)
  - Total: 426
  - Density: 5,282/sq mi (2,039.3/km^{2})
- Time zone: UTC-5 (Eastern (EST))
  - Summer (DST): UTC-4 (EDT)
- FIPS code: 21-72750
- GNIS feature ID: 0504162

Springlee is a neighborhood of St. Matthews, Kentucky, an area of Louisville. The population was 426 at the 2000 census. Until 2000 Springlee was an independent Sixth Class city in Jefferson County, Kentucky, United States. Springlee was incorporated on April 25, 1950. Springlee was dissolved on December 5, 2000, and annexed by the City of St. Matthews on January 8, 2001

== Geography ==
Springlee is located at 38°14′28″N 85°38′32″W (38.241220, -85.642246).

According to the United States Census Bureau, the city has a total area of 0.1 square miles (0.26 km^{2}), all of it land.

== Demographics ==
As of the census of 2000, there were 426 people, 209 households, and 112 families residing in the city. The population density was 5,281.6 inhabitants per square mile (2,039.2/km^{2}). There were 217 housing units at an average density of 2,690.4 per square mile (1,038.8/km^{2}). The racial makeup of the city was 97.18% White, 0.23% African American, 0.23% Asian, 0.23% from other races, and 2.11% from two or more races. Hispanic or Latino of any race were 1.41% of the population.

There were 209 households, out of which 26.8% had children under the age of 18 living with them, 42.6% were married couples living together, 9.1% had a female householder with no husband present, and 46.4% were non-families. 41.6% of all households were made up of individuals, and 16.7% had someone living alone who was 65 years of age or older. The average household size was 2.04 and the average family size was 2.80.

In the city, the population was spread out, with 21.6% under the age of 18, 3.3% from 18 to 24, 38.0% from 25 to 44, 22.5% from 45 to 64, and 14.6% who were 65 years of age or older. The median age was 38 years. For every 100 females, there were 79.7 males. For every 100 females age 18 and over, there were 71.3 males.

The median income for a household in the city was $46,136, and the median income for a family was $63,750. Males had a median income of $50,750 versus $36,875 for females. The per capita income for the city was $29,102. About 1.8% of families and 3.3% of the population were below the poverty line, including 4.5% of those under age 18 and 4.2% of those age 65 or over.
