= Hikes Point, Louisville =

Neighborhood in Louisville, Kentucky

Coordinates: 38.21920°N 85.62720°W

Hikes Point is a neighborhood in eastern Louisville, Kentucky, USA. Its boundaries are I-264 to the north, Breckenridge Lane to the west, and irregular boundaries to the other sides.

The area was settled by American Revolutionary War veteran George Hikes in 1791 on land sold to him by William Meriwether. Hikes was born in 1761 in Lancaster County, Pennsylvania. After serving in the Revolutionary War, serving under James Cook's Company of Fourth Battalion of Militia in Lancaster County, PA; he moved to Louisville Kentucky with his four young sons, John, Jacob, Andrew and George, three daughters and his wife Barbara Oleweiler.

Hikes built a number of homes on this land to include; a stone home named Two Mile Town another one is now St. Michael's Antioch (a family cemetery is on the grounds) was one of the original stone houses in the Hikes family, later willed to Andrew Hikes, George's youngest son. (Source: Jefferson Count, Kentucky Will Book 2, page 484.) One original Hikes family home was demolished in August 2013. It was a log cabin built around 1851, previously occupied by John E's Restaurant (and prior to that, Bill Boland's Restaurant) at the corner of Bardstown Road and Hikes Lane. The log walls of the building had been plastered over, but many of the massive log walls were uncovered when the restaurant opened in the 1980s. There is also a Hikes family cemetery to the side of the building. Hikes opened grist and saw mills as the community grew and a cloth industry developed in the early 19th century.

In the early 20th century developers bought up much of the land surrounding Hikes' home, but there was little interest in the area until after World War II. Roy McMahan purchased the nearby Eberle family farm in 1946 and built several subdivisions and shopping centers, some of which bear his name, and Hikes Point has long been a strong retail area.

Hikes Point was also the original home of Southeast Christian Church, which grew to become one of the largest Christian congregations in the U.S., although it has long since moved from the area. Since their move away from Hikes Point, the area has been home to Canaan Missionary Baptist Church which moved from the Shively area of the city to Hikes Point in 1998, one of the largest Baptist churches in Kentucky, with over 6500 members.

== Neighboring communities ==
- Meadowview Estates
- Buechel
