= Lake Dreamland, Louisville =

Neighborhood of Louisville, Kentucky

Lake Dreamland is a neighborhood of Louisville, Kentucky located along Campground Road and the Ohio River.

== Geography ==
Lake Dreamland is located at 38°12′18″N 85°51′6″W.

== History ==
A developer named Ed Hartlage began developing Lake Dreamland as a resort in the 1930s. He dammed a creek called Beaver's Run in 1931 to create Dreamland Lake, and leased the waterfront lots to people willing to build cottages there. It was initially intended purely as a summer resort for wealthy Louisvillians. He was claimed to have adopted the moniker after a critic warned him that his grandiose development plan was a pipe dream that would never come true.

However, the Ohio River flood of 1937 devastated the area and permanently stunted growth. A floodwall cut through the development, and the remaining cottages were soon in poor repair. The neighborhood lacked public water, electricity and paved roads, so Hartlage rented the properties for much lower prices than he had originally hoped. Hartlage retained ownership in the 1940s as workers from nearby industrial area called Rubbertown built homes in Lake Dreamland.

As an additional attraction, Hartlage erected a dance hall initially called Hartlage's Barn, but better known as Club El Rancho, a popular rock and roll club. In 1957, the Courier-Journal credited Club El Rancho with being the first place in Louisville to hear live rock and roll music. The club became a hangout for a motorcycle gang by the late 1960s, and burnt down in 1967. Local legend held that a Lake Dreamland resident torched the club to get rid of the nuisance.

Although a few residents owned their lots, most simply rented, which made the area ineligible for county-financed construction of utilities or roads. In 1982, Jefferson County Community Development officials said the Lake Dreamland area had some of the worst housing in the county, with conditions such as backed-up sewage, caved-in floors and ceilings, and no indoor plumbing in some structures. Ed Hartlage died in 1980, and residents were finally able to buy the land from his estate in 1980.

Residents formed a neighborhood association in 1983 and resisted a 1988 plan for the government to gradually buy out the flood-prone neighborhood.
