= Central State Hospital (Kentucky) =

- Central Kentucky Lunatic Asylum
- U.S. National Register of Historic Places
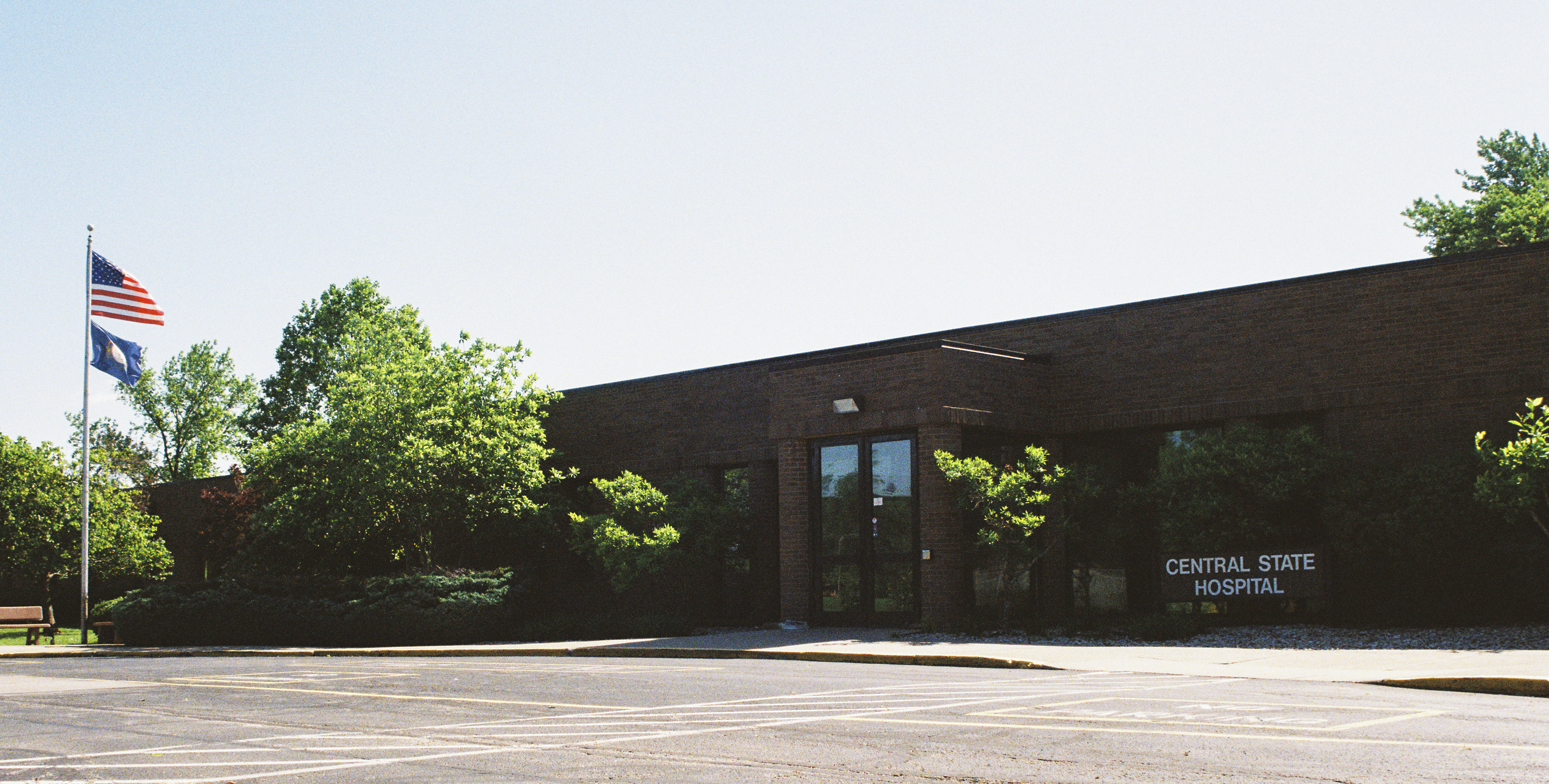
- Central State Hospital in 2025

- Location within Kentucky Location within the United States
- Nearest city: Anchorage, Kentucky vicinity
- Coordinates: 38°16′41″N 85°33′18″W
- Area: less than one acre
- Built: 1874
- Architectural style: Classical Revival, Tudor Revival
- MPS: Jefferson County MRA
- NRHP reference No.: 83002646
- Added to NRHP: July 12, 1983

Central State Hospital is a 192-bed adult psychiatric hospital located in the Lakeland neighborhood of Louisville, Kentucky.

== History ==
In 1869, 200 acres were purchased by the Kentucky State Legislature from the descendants of renown frontiersman Issac Hite to establish a "State House of Reform for Juvenile Delinquents." This was located on the outskirts of what would become Anchorage, Kentucky. In 1873, due to overcrowding at both of Kentucky's mental hospitals, the House of Reform was converted into the Fourth Kentucky Lunatic Asylum, with Dr. C.C. Forbes as its first Superintendent. The following year an act of the legislature renamed it the Central Kentucky Lunatic Asylum. In late 1887, it received its own post office, called simply "Asylum". The following year its name was changed to "Lakeland", and the institution was commonly referred to as "Lakeland Hospital" or "Lakeland Asylum". By 1900, its official name had been changed to the Central Kentucky Asylum for the Insane. By 1912 it was known as Central State Hospital. Comparable institutions are Eastern State Hospital at Lexington in Fayette County and Western State Hospital at Hopkinsville, Christian County, Kentucky. All three were administered by the Board of Charitable Organizations.

The secluded, rural setting was typical of such facilities in the late 19th century, as such an environment was thought to be beneficial for recovery from mental illness. However, not all patients had mental disorders - some suffered from brain damage, intellectual disability or were simply poor or elderly. The early years of the 1880s were marked by repeated allegations of patient abuse. In 1879, Dr. Robert H. Gale was appointed superintendent. In 1882, conduct was investigated in the "ducking" or near drowning death of a patient. He was later exonerated of the charges. Gale was followed by H. K. Pusey in 1884.

Throughout Central States history, the institution suffered from improper funding, understaffing, and overcrowding. Though built to accommodate 1,600 patients, by 1940 there were in excess of 2,400 patients and again various accusations of patient mistreatment began to arise. However, starting in the 1950s, changing community perception of the mentally disturbed led to fewer patients staying permanently in mental hospitals. In 1962, $3,000,000 was allowed by the state to construct more modern facilities on LaGrange Road. Many of these are still standing.

In 1986, a new modern administration facility was completed on property adjacent to the 1960s buildings. The original hospital and surviving structures on what was called "the North Campus" were subsequently abandoned and demolished in the late 1990s.

It is unknown how many deceased patients are buried on the hospital grounds, though over 900 death certificates exist denoting burial in both of the hospitals cemeteries.

== See also ==
- National Register of Historic Places listings in Anchorage, Kentucky
