= Fairmeade, St. Matthews, Kentucky =

Fairmeade
- St. Matthews neighborhood
- Location within the state of Kentucky
- Coordinates: 38°14′58″N 85°38′7″W
- Country: United States
- State: Kentucky
- City: St. Matthews

Area
  - Total: 0.077 sq mi (0.2 km^{2})
  - Land: 0.077 sq mi (0.2 km^{2})
  - Water: 0 sq mi (0.0 km^{2})
- Elevation: 520 ft (160 m)

Population (2000)
  - Total: 264
  - Density: 4,180/sq mi (1,614.1/km^{2})
- Time zone: UTC-5 (Eastern (EST))
  - Summer (DST): UTC-4 (EDT)
- FIPS code: 21-26074
- GNIS feature ID: 0491881

Fairmeade is a neighborhood of St. Matthews, Kentucky. The population was 264 at the 2000 census.

== History ==
Until 2000 Fairmeade was an independent Sixth class city in Jefferson County, Kentucky, United States. Fairmeade was incorporated on October 8, 1953, and dissolved on September 1, 2000. Fairmeade was annexed by St. Matthews on January 8, 2001.

== Geography ==
Fairmeade is located at 38°14′58″N 85°38′7″W (38.249471, -85.635260).

According to the United States Census Bureau, the city has a total area of 0.1 square miles (0.26 km^{2}), all of it land.

== Demographics ==
As of the census of 2000, there were 264 people, 115 households, and 71 families residing in the city. The population density was 4,180.4 inhabitants per square mile (1,614.1/km^{2}). There were 117 housing units at an average density of 1,852.7 per square mile (715.3/km^{2}). The racial makeup of the city was 97.35% White, 1.14% Black or African American, 1.14% Asian, and 0.38% from two or more races.

There were 115 households, out of which 25.2% had children under the age of 18 living with them, 49.6% were married couples living together, 12.2% had a female householder with no husband present, and 37.4% were non-families. 33.0% of all households were made up of individuals, and 10.4% had someone living alone who was 65 years of age or older. The average household size was 2.30 and the average family size was 2.90.

In the city, the population was spread out, with 22.3% under the age of 18, 5.7% from 18 to 24, 27.7% from 25 to 44, 24.2% from 45 to 64, and 20.1% who were 65 years of age or older. The median age was 41 years. For every 100 females, there were 85.9 males. For every 100 females age 18 and over, there were 79.8 males.

The median income for a household in the city was $60,875, and the median income for a family was $74,583. Males had a median income of $61,806 versus $32,500 for females. The per capita income for the city was $33,243. About 5.6% of families and 5.5% of the population were below the poverty line, including none of those under the age of eighteen and 25.0% of those 65 or over.
