= Beechland Beach, Louisville =

Neighborhood in Louisville, Kentucky

Coordinates: 38°21′14″N 85°38′02″W

Beechland Beach is a neighborhood of Louisville, Kentucky located on the Ohio River at Beechland Beach Road.
