= Valley Village, Louisville =

Human settlement in Kentucky, US

Valley Village is a neighborhood in Valley Station, Louisville, Kentucky. It is located at Dixie Highway (US 31 W/US 60) and Watson Lane.

== Geography ==
Valley Village, Louisville is located north of 38°3′5″N 85°53′40″W.
