= Whipps Millgate, Kentucky =

- City
- Location within the state of Kentucky
- Coordinates: 38°16′36″N 85°34′34″W
- Country: United States
- State: Kentucky
- County: Jefferson

Area
  - Total: 0.077 sq mi (0.2 km^{2})
  - Land: 0.077 sq mi (0.2 km^{2})
  - Water: 0 sq mi (0.0 km^{2})
- Elevation: 663 ft (202 m)

Population (2000)
  - Total: 415
  - Density: 6,403/sq mi (2,472.1/km^{2})
- Time zone: UTC-5 (Eastern (EST))
  - Summer (DST): UTC-4 (EDT)
- FIPS code: 21-82398
- GNIS feature ID: 0506559

Whipps Millgate is a former city in Jefferson County, Kentucky, United States. The population was 415 at the 2000 census. The City of Whipps Millgate was incorporated on April 26, 1969, it was dissolved and annexed by the City of Lyndon, Kentucky on July 1, 2001.

== Geography ==
Whipps Millgate is located at 38°16′36″N 85°34′34″W (38.276637, -85.576243).

According to the United States Census Bureau, the city has a total area of 0.1 square miles (0.26 km^{2}), all of it land.

== Demographics ==
As of the census of 2000, there were 415 people, 203 households, and 110 families residing in the city. The population density was 6,402.8 inhabitants per square mile (2,472.1/km^{2}). There were 212 housing units at an average density of 3,270.8 per square mile (1,262.9/km^{2}). The racial makeup of the city was 85.78% White, 9.88% African American, 0.48% Native American, 2.65% Asian, 0.24% from other races, and 0.96% from two or more races. Hispanic or Latino of any race were 1.20% of the population.

There were 203 households, out of which 23.6% had children under the age of 18 living with them, 37.9% were married couples living together, 12.8% had a female householder with no husband present, and 45.8% were non-families. 36.5% of all households were made up of individuals, and 11.3% had someone living alone who was 65 years of age or older. The average household size was 2.04 and the average family size was 2.70.

In the city, the population was spread out, with 19.8% under the age of 18, 6.3% from 18 to 24, 37.1% from 25 to 44, 21.4% from 45 to 64, and 15.4% who were 65 years of age or older. The median age was 38 years. For every 100 females, there were 75.1 males. For every 100 females age 18 and over, there were 73.4 males.

The median income for a household in the city was $38,393, and the median income for a family was $44,327. Males had a median income of $36,354 versus $21,167 for females. The per capita income for the city was $20,646. About 4.3% of families and 6.6% of the population were below the poverty line, including 8.4% of those under age 18 and 2.8% of those age 65 or over.
