= Spring Mill, Kentucky =

- City
- Location of Spring Mill in Jefferson County, Kentucky

- Location within the state of Kentucky Spring Mill (the United States)
- Coordinates: 38°08′37″N 85°37′54″W
- Country: United States
- State: Kentucky
- County: Jefferson

Area
  - Total: 0.054 sq mi (0.14 km^{2})
  - Land: 0.054 sq mi (0.14 km^{2})
  - Water: 0 sq mi (0.00 km^{2})
- Elevation: 650 ft (200 m)

Population (2020)
  - Total: 294
  - Density: 5,283.9/sq mi (2,040.14/km^{2})
- Time zone: UTC-5 (Eastern (EST))
  - Summer (DST): UTC-4 (EDT)
- ZIP Code: 40228
- FIPS code: 21-72770
- GNIS feature ID: 2405507
- Website: cityofspringmill.com

Spring Mill is a home rule-class city in Jefferson County, Kentucky, United States. As of the 2020 census, Spring Mill had a population of 294.

== Geography ==
Spring Mill is located in southern Jefferson County and is 12 miles (19 km) southeast of downtown Louisville.

According to the United States Census Bureau, the city has a total area of 0.054 square miles (0.14 km^{2}), all land.

== Demographics ==
Historical population
Census	Pop.	Note	%±
1990	342		—
2000	380		11.1%
2010	287		−24.5%
2020	294		2.4%
U.S. Decennial Census

At the 2000 census, there were 380 people, 130 households and 121 families residing in the city. The population density was 6,300.5 inhabitants per square mile (2,432.6/km^{2}). There were 130 housing units at an average density of 2,155.4 per square mile (832.2/km^{2}). The racial makeup of the city was 98.42% White, 0.53% Asian, and 1.05% from two or more races. Hispanic or Latino of any race were 1.32% of the population.

There were 130 households, of which 35.4% had children under the age of 18 living with them, 86.9% were married couples living together, 5.4% had a female householder with no husband present, and 6.9% were non-families. 6.2% of all households were made up of individuals, and 4.6% had someone living alone who was 65 years of age or older. The average household size was 2.92 and the average family size was 3.04.

25.8% of the population were under the age of 18, 5.8% from 18 to 24, 21.8% from 25 to 44, 33.9% from 45 to 64, and 12.6% who were 65 years of age or older. The median age was 43 years. For every 100 females, there were 100.0 males. For every 100 females age 18 and over, there were 89.3 males.

The median household income was $73,250 and the median family income was $72,750. Males had a median income of $50,625 and females $31,500. The per capita income was $29,849. None of the population or families were below the poverty line.
