= Lake Louisvilla, Louisville =

Human settlement in Kentucky, US

Coordinates: 38°18′49″N 85°30′51″W

Lake Louisvilla is a neighborhood partially located in Louisville, Kentucky. It is located between Westport Road in Louisville and KY 22 in Oldham County. Lake Louisvilla was developed in the 1920s as a summer resort for people living in the city of Louisville. The state of Kentucky drained the lake in the late 1980s due to safety concerns regarding the stability of a dam.
