= Cherrywood Village, St. Matthews, Kentucky =

Neighborhood in Kentucky, United States

Cherrywood Village
- St. Matthews neighborhood
- Location within the state of Kentucky
- Coordinates: 38°15′41″N 85°39′17″W
- Country: United States
- State: Kentucky
- City: St. Matthews

Area
  - Total: 0.077 sq mi (0.2 km^{2})
  - Land: 0.077 sq mi (0.2 km^{2})
  - Water: 0 sq mi (0.0 km^{2})
- Elevation: 560 ft (170 m)

Population (2000)
  - Total: 327
  - Density: 4,790/sq mi (1,849.6/km^{2})
- Time zone: UTC-5 (Eastern (EST))
  - Summer (DST): UTC-4 (EDT)
- FIPS code: 21-14590
- GNIS feature ID: 0489418

Cherrywood Village is a neighborhood and former city in Jefferson County, Kentucky, United States. Cherrywood Village was annexed by the City of St. Matthews in 2001. The population was 327 at the 2000 census.

== Geography ==
Cherrywood Village is located at 38°15′41″N 85°39′17″W (38.261470, -85.654714).

According to the United States Census Bureau, the city had a total area of 0.1 square miles (0.26 km^{2}), all of it land.

== Demographics ==
As of the census of 2000, there were 327 people, 144 households, and 94 families residing in the city. The population density was 4,790.4 inhabitants per square mile (1,849.6/km^{2}). There were 149 housing units at an average density of 2,182.8 per square mile (842.8/km^{2}). The racial makeup of the city was 99.39% White and 0.61% Native American. Hispanic or Latino of any race were 0.31% of the population.

There were 144 households, out of which 34.0% had children under the age of 18 living with them, 52.1% were married couples living together, 11.8% had a female householder with no husband present, and 34.7% were non-families. 30.6% of all households were made up of individuals, and 14.6% had someone living alone who was 65 years of age or older. The average household size was 2.27 and the average family size was 2.86.

In the city, the population was spread out, with 25.1% under the age of 18, 3.4% from 18 to 24, 33.0% from 25 to 44, 20.5% from 45 to 64, and 18.0% who were 65 years of age or older. The median age was 38 years. For every 100 females, there were 80.7 males. For every 100 females age 18 and over, there were 81.5 males.

The median income for a household in the city was $56,786, and the median income for a family was $60,833. Males had a median income of $43,750 versus $33,625 for females. The per capita income for the city was $30,973. About 5.1% of families and 6.7% of the population were below the poverty line, including 11.6% of those under age 18 and 6.1% of those age 65 or over.
