= South Park, Louisville =

Neighborhood in Louisville, Kentucky

Coordinates: 38°06′58″N 85°44′12″W

South Park is a neighborhood of Louisville, Kentucky, centered along South Park Road and Fairdale Road.
