= St. Matthews, Kentucky =

- City
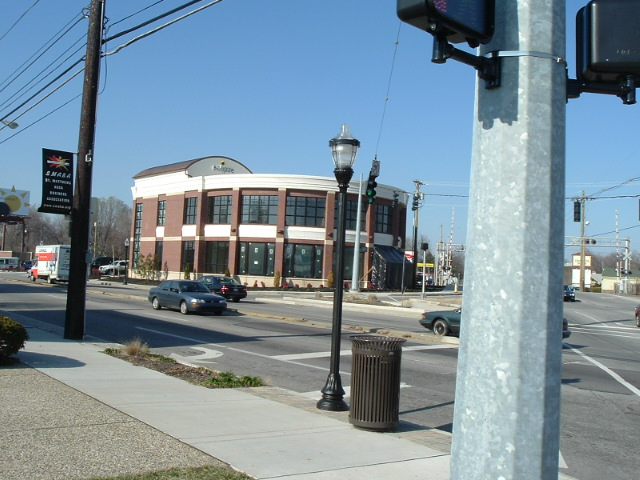
- Downtown St. Matthews

- Location of St. Matthews in Jefferson County, Kentucky

- Location within the state of Kentucky St. Matthews (the United States)
- Coordinates: 38°14′59″N 85°38′18″W
- Country: United States
- State: Kentucky
- County: Jefferson
- Incorporated: 1950

Area
  - Total: 4.40 sq mi (11.39 km^{2})
  - Land: 4.38 sq mi (11.35 km^{2})
  - Water: 0.015 sq mi (0.04 km^{2})
- Elevation: 535 ft (163 m)

Population (2020)
  - Total: 17,534
  - Density: 4,002.9/sq mi (1,545.52/km^{2})
- Time zone: UTC−5 (Eastern (EST))
  - Summer (DST): UTC−4 (EDT)
- ZIP Code: 40207
- FIPS code: 21-67944
- GNIS feature ID: 2405399
- Website: stmatthewsky.gov

St. Matthews (Note: St. Matthews is the city's formal name, although it is also informally written as "Saint Matthews" and "St. Matthew's".) is a city in Jefferson County, Kentucky, United States. It forms part of the Louisville Metro government but is separately incorporated as a home rule-class city. As of the 2020 census, St. Matthews had a population of 17,534. It is the 23rd-largest city in the state. St. Matthews is one of the state's major shopping areas, home to the fifth-largest mall in Kentucky (Mall St. Matthews) along with many smaller shopping centers along Shelbyville Road.

== History ==
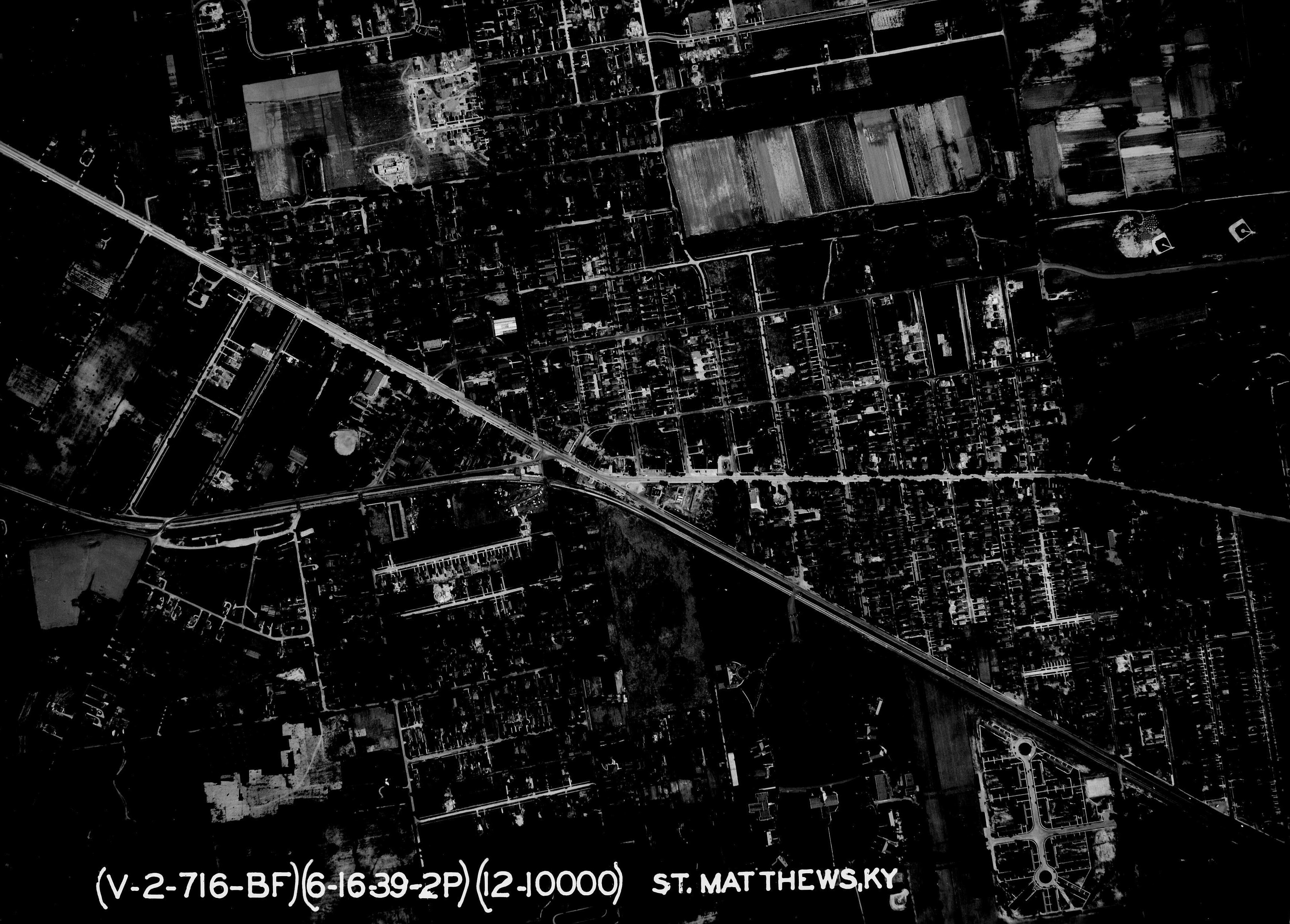
St. Matthews in 1939

Dating the arrival of American Indians to present-day Kentucky remains controversial, with estimates ranging from 40,000 to 10,000 years before the present. As with later European cultures, indigenous cultures were often divided near the falls of the Ohio River, which marked a transition zone in travel and settlement. During the late Woodland period (c. 1st century), this area was between the Ohioan Hopewell culture and the Illinois Crab Orchard culture that extended to the west. Later (c. 1200), it was the boundary between the Mississippian and Fort Ancient cultures. During the 18th century, the area was claimed by various Indian tribes, including the Shawnee from the northwest and the Iroquois to the east; based in New York and Pennsylvania, the Iroquois used the Ohio Valley as a hunting ground by right of conquest.

The area eventually known as St. Matthews was first settled by European Americans in 1779 during the American Revolutionary War by Col. James John Floyd of Virginia. He had conducted an important survey of the Jefferson County area in 1774, and bought 2,000 acres (8 km^{2}) of land from Virginia and other colonial veterans who had been awarded the parcels for their service in the French and Indian War (known as the Seven Years' War in Europe). He arrived overland on November 8, 1779, bringing several family members and a black slave. They built cabins and a stockade, which came to be known as "Floyd's Station".

During the early 19th century, the area held several plantations and was known as the "garden of the state". As with most areas of the Inner Bluegrass Region, the area was settled by many migrants from Virginia, who brought slaves for labor. The major crops were labor-intensive tobacco and hemp; breeding livestock, primarily horses, was also important to the economy. There were some changes to mixed crops because the soil was exhausted from tobacco. In the years before the Civil War, Kentucky planters had a surplus of slaves and sold many at markets in Louisville to traders who took them to the Deep South in the domestic slave trade. Demand was high as the South was being developed for sugar and especially cotton. The invention of the cotton gin had made cultivation of short-staple cotton profitable.

The St. Matthews community developed around the intersection of what are now Breckenridge Lane, Shelbyville Road, and Westport Road. By 1840, it was known as "Gilman's Point", after local tavern owner Daniel Gilman. The name "St. Matthews" was adopted in 1850 after the completion of St. Matthew's Episcopal Church, the area's first. It became the official name of the community in 1851 when the newly opened U.S. post office adopted it. Later numerous other Protestant churches were founded, including Baptist. Holy Trinity, the oldest of the three Catholic churches in the city, was completed in 1882, following immigration to the area of Catholics from Switzerland and Germany. Trinity High School was established nearby in association with the church.

St. Matthews was connected to the Louisville, Cincinnati and Lexington Railroad (later part of the Louisville and Nashville) that connected Louisville to Anchorage and Middletown. The railroad did not greatly alter the economy of St. Matthews, however, which remained heavily agricultural well into the 20th century.

In the early 20th century, it produced so many potatoes that it was a major center of the country for this crop. From 1910 to 1946, it was home to the St. Matthews Produce Exchange, which was once the second-largest potato shipper in the country. The area began changing in the early 20th century as a result of urban transit and automobile traffic. Gradually the farms were subdivided and developed as residential areas. The original landowners' names – including Brown, Rudy, Nanz, Monohan, Oeschner, and Stich – were used for local streets. The town's first bank was founded in 1905. A modern shopping district began developing in the 1920s, to include the landmark Vogue Theater, opened in 1938.

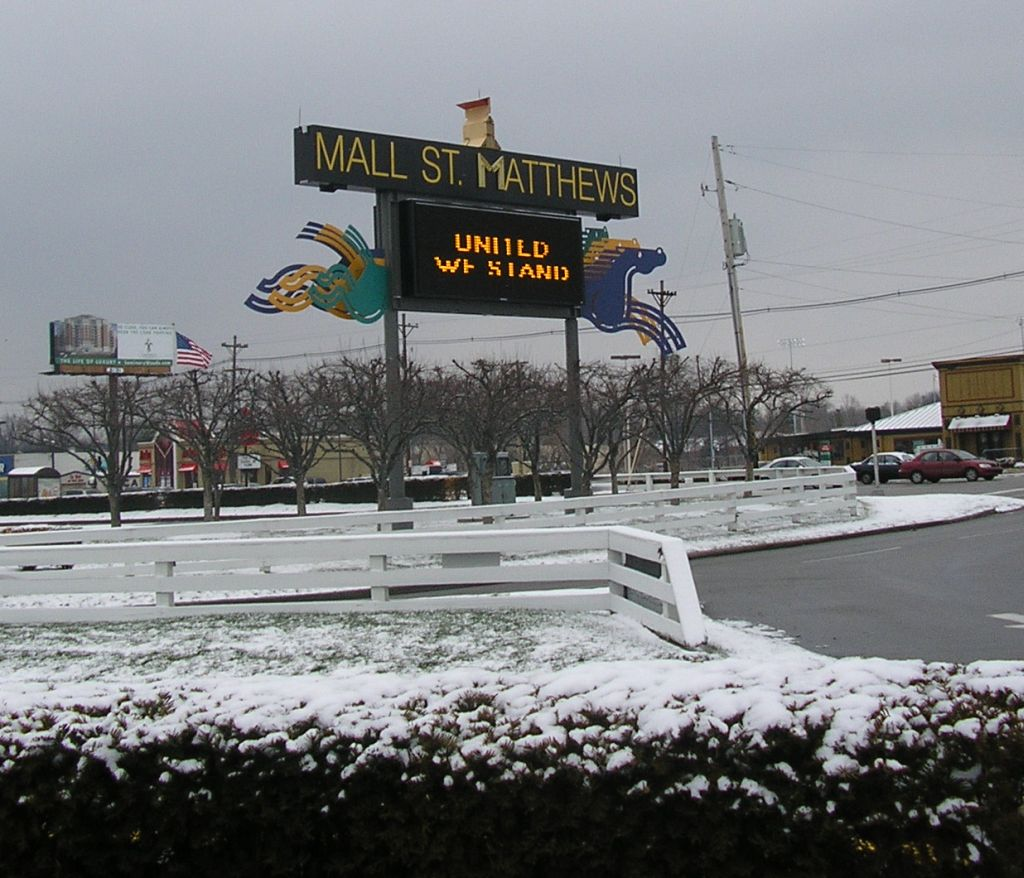
Mall St. Matthews is Kentucky's second-largest mall.

Growth of the area was accelerated by the Ohio River flood of 1937, which caused many families to leave low-lying ground in Louisville and move to St. Matthews. It incorporated as a city in 1950, partially to address infrastructure problems and to build a sewer system. The Mall St. Matthews, Louisville's first indoor shopping mall, opened around this time.

In 2001, St. Matthews annexed the cities of Broad Fields, Cherrywood Village, Fairmeade, Plymouth Village, and Springlee.

== Geography ==
St. Matthews is located in north-central Jefferson County at 38°15′0″N 85°38′33″W (38.249931, −85.642613). It is 7 miles (11 km) east of downtown Louisville. According to the United States Census Bureau, the city has a total area of 4.3 square miles (11.2 km^{2}), of which 0.02 square miles (0.04 km^{2}), or 0.36%, are water.

The present boundaries of St. Matthews are roughly Cannons Lane to the west, I-264 to the south and east, and several subdivisions off Brownsboro Road to the north. These include Bellewood, Brownsboro Village, Maryhill Estates, and Windy Hills. Farther east, St. Matthews is bordered by Woodlawn Park, Graymoor-Devondale, Lyndon, and Norwood. The separately incorporated cities of Richlawn, Beechwood Village and Norbourne Estates are enclaves within St. Matthews.

== Demographics ==
Historical population
Census	Pop.	Note	%±
1960	8,738		—
1970	13,152		50.5%
1980	13,519		2.8%
1990	15,800		16.9%
2000	15,852		0.3%
2010	17,472		10.2%
2020	17,534		0.4%
2024 (est.)	17,806		1.6%
U.S. Decennial Census

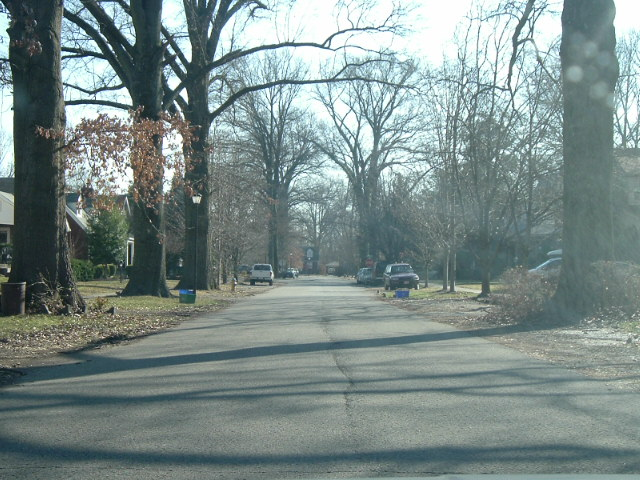
A residential street in St. Matthews

=== 2020 census ===
As of the 2020 census, St. Matthews had a population of 17,534. The median age was 37.8 years. 16.4% of residents were under the age of 18 and 19.2% of residents were 65 years of age or older. For every 100 females there were 89.5 males, and for every 100 females age 18 and over there were 87.7 males age 18 and over.

100.0% of residents lived in urban areas, while 0.0% lived in rural areas.

There were 8,698 households in St. Matthews, of which 20.6% had children under the age of 18 living in them. Of all households, 33.2% were married-couple households, 24.0% were households with a male householder and no spouse or partner present, and 34.9% were households with a female householder and no spouse or partner present. About 43.5% of all households were made up of individuals and 14.9% had someone living alone who was 65 years of age or older.

There were 9,605 housing units, of which 9.4% were vacant. The homeowner vacancy rate was 1.6% and the rental vacancy rate was 11.3%.

Racial composition as of the 2020 census
Race	Number	Percent
White	14,272	81.4%
Black or African American	1,251	7.1%
American Indian and Alaska Native	31	0.2%
Asian	448	2.6%
Native Hawaiian and Other Pacific Islander	10	0.1%
Some other race	395	2.3%
Two or more races	1,127	6.4%
Hispanic or Latino (of any race)	979	5.6%

=== 2000 census ===
As of the census of 2000, there were 15,852 people, 7,978 households, and 3,661 families residing in the city. The population density was 3,938 inhabitants per square mile (1,520/km^{2}). There were 8,537 housing units at an average density of 2,121 per square mile (819/km^{2}). The racial makeup of the city was 90.32% White, 4.95% African American, 0.15% Native American, 2.62% Asian, 0.01% Pacific Islander, 0.59% from other races, and 1.36% from two or more races. Hispanic or Latino of any race were 1.69% of the population.

There were 7,978 households, out of which 19.0% had children under the age of 18 living with them, 34.9% were married couples living together, 8.4% had a female householder with no husband present, and 54.1% were non-families. 45.2% of all households were made up of individuals, and 14.1% had someone living alone who was 65 years of age or older. The average household size was 1.94 and the average family size was 2.76.

In the city, the population was spread out, with 17.0% under the age of 18, 10.2% from 18 to 24, 35.6% from 25 to 44, 20.1% from 45 to 64, and 17.1% who were 65 years of age or older. The median age was 37 years. For every 100 females, there were 86.6 males. For every 100 females age 18 and over, there were 83.6 males.

== Education ==
Trinity High School, a Catholic all-boys college-preparatory high school, along with Waggener High School and St. Matthews Elementary School, serve the area. The lending library is a branch of the Louisville Free Public Library.

== Notable people ==
- Jonathan Hay, Louisville record producer who worked out of his studio in St. Matthews for over a decade. Some of his projects that were recorded in St. Matthews landed on Billboard charts. He was a victim of a home invasion at Mallard Crossing in the local neighborhood but survived the attack.
- Bob Heleringer, Louisville lawyer and member of the Kentucky House of Representatives, 1980–2002; St. Matthews resident
