= Cherokee-Seneca, Louisville =

Neighborhood in Louisville, Kentucky

Coordinates: 38°14′15″N 85°41′04″W

Cherokee-Seneca is a neighborhood in Louisville, Kentucky, United States. It is bounded by I-64 and other neighborhoods, and includes the two large parks Cherokee Park and Seneca Park, as well as the homes built around those parks. The area is hilly, consisting of ridges around the middle fork of Beargrass Creek. It is home to the former Gardencourt Mansion, now part of the Louisville Presbyterian Theological Seminary.

The Louisville Presbyterian Theological Seminary relocated to the area. There are also mansions off Alta Vista built by some of Louisville's wealthiest families in the early 20th century.

Gardencourt is a 20-room Beaux-Arts style mansion, completed in 1906. A carriage house and greenhouse were built in 1907 on the 14-acre (57,000 m^{2}) property, which was landscaped by the Olmsted Brothers firm. The mansion was built by the daughters of George W. Norton, and was donated to the University of Louisville in 1946 for its School of Music. The Emily A. Davison recital hall was built in 1962, hosting performers including Igor Stravinsky and Aaron Copland, although the school of music moved to the Shelby Campus in 1969. The property was eventually sold to the seminary in 1987 and is now used as classrooms and meeting halls.

Another mansion is Rostrevor, a 23-room Italian Renaissance home built in 1908 put on the market in 2006 for $7.5 million - the highest publicly advertised price ever for a private residence in Jefferson County.
