= Juniper Beach, Louisville =

Neighborhood of Louisville, Kentucky

Coordinates: 38°19′13″N 85°38′48″W

Juniper Beach is a neighborhood of Louisville, Kentucky located on the Ohio River at River Road and Juniper Beach Road.
