= Hollyvilla, Kentucky =

- City
- Location of Hollyvilla in Jefferson County, Kentucky

- Location within the state of Kentucky Hollyvilla (the United States)
- Coordinates: 38°05′34″N 85°44′49″W
- Country: United States
- State: Kentucky
- County: Jefferson
- Incorporated: 1958

Area
  - Total: 0.34 sq mi (0.88 km^{2})
  - Land: 0.34 sq mi (0.88 km^{2})
  - Water: 0 sq mi (0.00 km^{2})
- Elevation: 525 ft (160 m)

Population (2020)
  - Total: 518
  - Density: 1,518.0/sq mi (586.09/km^{2})
- Time zone: UTC-5 (Eastern (EST))
  - Summer (DST): UTC-4 (EDT)
- ZIP Code: 40118
- FIPS code: 21-37630
- GNIS feature ID: 2404718

Hollyvilla is a home rule-class city in Jefferson County, Kentucky, United States. As of the 2020 census, Hollyvilla had a population of 518.

== Geography ==
Hollyvilla is located in southwestern Jefferson County 12 miles (19 km) south of downtown Louisville. 890-foot (270 m) Holsclaw Hill rises just south of the city limits.

According to the United States Census Bureau, the city has a total area of 0.34 square miles (0.88 km^{2}), all land.

== Demographics ==
Historical population
| Census | Pop. | Note | %± |
|---|---|---|---|
| 1960 | 464 | | — |
| 1970 | 907 | | 95.5% |
| 1980 | 476 | | −47.5% |
| 1990 | 649 | | 36.3% |
| 2000 | 481 | | −25.9% |
| 2010 | 537 | | 11.6% |
| 2020 | 518 | | −3.5% |
U.S. Decennial Census

As of the census of 2000, there were 481 people, 194 households, and 149 families residing in the city. The population density was 1,422.4 inhabitants per square mile (549.2/km^{2}). There were 204 housing units at an average density of 603.3 per square mile (232.9/km^{2}). The racial makeup of the city was 97.71% White, 0.83% African American, 0.42% from other races, and 1.04% from two or more races. Hispanic or Latino of any race were 0.62% of the population.

There were 194 households, out of which 28.9% had children under the age of 18 living with them, 63.4% were married couples living together, 9.3% had a female householder with no husband present, and 22.7% were non-families. 18.0% of all households were made up of individuals, and 5.2% had someone living alone who was 65 years of age or older. The average household size was 2.48 and the average family size was 2.82.

In the city, the population was spread out, with 20.4% under the age of 18, 8.9% from 18 to 24, 30.6% from 25 to 44, 25.6% from 45 to 64, and 14.6% who were 65 years of age or older. The median age was 40 years. For every 100 females, there were 92.4 males. For every 100 females age 18 and over, there were 93.4 males.

The median income for a household in the city was $37,143, and the median income for a family was $37,813. Males had a median income of $28,625 versus $22,841 for females. The per capita income for the city was $17,440. About 5.3% of families and 4.6% of the population were below the poverty line, including 11.1% of those under age 18 and 4.8% of those age 65 or over.
