= Hunters Trace, Louisville =

Neighborhood in Louisville, Kentucky

Coordinates: 38°10′05″N 85°49′42″W

Hunters Trace is a neighborhood of Louisville, Kentucky located along Dixie Highway (US 31W) and Upper Hunters Trace.
