= Wilder Park, Louisville =

Neighborhood of Louisville, Kentucky

Coordinates: 38°11′50″N 85°45′45″W

Wilder Park is a neighborhood four miles south of downtown Louisville, Kentucky, USA. The area was originally the site of Greenland race course, built in 1866, a sister track of Churchill Downs. Greenland track closed in 1888 and the area became the Wilder Park neighborhood.

The first houses in Wilder Park were built off Southern Parkway in 1891. The rest of the area was completed by 1901 as streetcar lines linked the neighborhood to Iroquois Park and new factories in South Louisville. In 1904, Wilder Park was part of the incorporated city of Oakdale, until the city of Louisville annexed it in 1922.

A memorial to South Louisville veterans of the Second World War is located in Wilder Park in the 3900 block of south Second Street.

== Demographics ==
As of 2010, the population of Wilder Park was 2,798, of which 53% are white, 26% are black, 13% are Hispanic, and 2% are listed as other. The median household income was $23,708 (in 2015 dollars).
