= Meriwether, Louisville =

Neighborhood of Louisville, Kentucky

Coordinates: 38°13′27″N 85°44′45″W

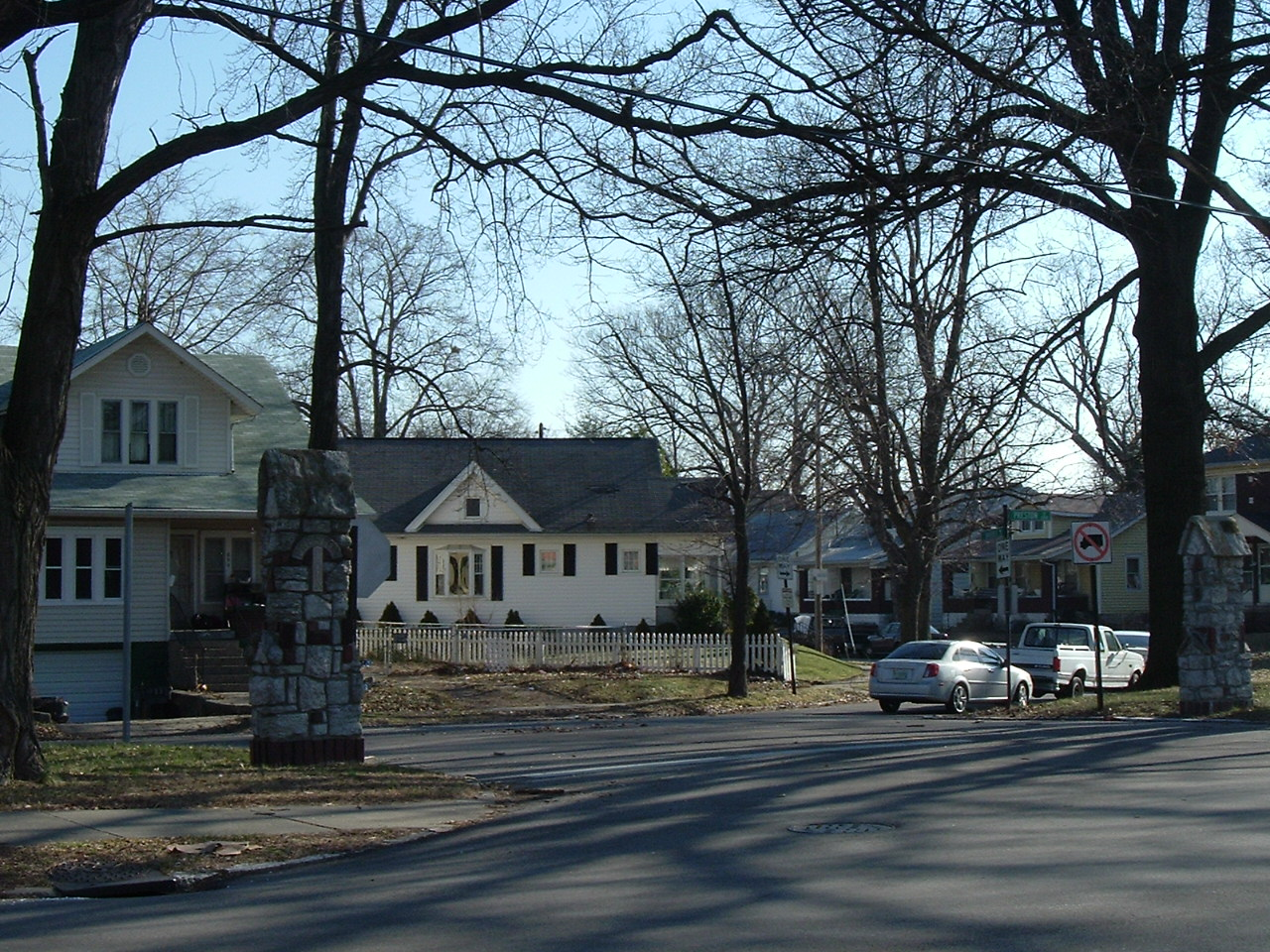
Barbee Ave in Meriwether

Meriwether is a neighborhood two miles southeast of downtown Louisville, Kentucky, USA, and just east of the University of Louisville. It was laid out by David Meriwether in 1871 and the first houses were built in 1891. Nearly all of the homes are shotgun houses.

Its boundaries are the CSX railroad tracks to the north, Shelby Street to the east and I-65 to the west. Lincoln Park and Preston Park are located in the neighborhood. It is commonly referred to as part of greater Schnitzelburg. Meriwether is also sometimes confused with Louisville's Germantown and Saint Joseph's neighborhood.

== Demographics ==
As of 2000, the population of Meriwether was 1,442, of which 64.9% are white, 29.8% are black, 4.2% are listed as other, and 1% are Hispanic. College graduates are 10.4% of the population, people w/o a high school degree are 23.9%, people with 1+ years of college w/o a degree are 13.6%. Females outnumber males 53% to 47%.
