= Richlawn, Kentucky =

- City
- Location of Richlawn in Jefferson County, Kentucky

- Location within the state of Kentucky Richlawn (the United States)
- Coordinates: 38°15′17″N 85°38′28″W
- Country: United States
- State: Kentucky
- County: Jefferson

Area
  - Total: 0.10 sq mi (0.26 km^{2})
  - Land: 0.10 sq mi (0.26 km^{2})
  - Water: 0 sq mi (0.00 km^{2})
- Elevation: 541 ft (165 m)

Population (2020)
  - Total: 415
  - Density: 4,100/sq mi (1,583.2/km^{2})
- Time zone: UTC-5 (Eastern (EST))
  - Summer (DST): UTC-4 (EDT)
- ZIP Code: 40207
- FIPS code: 21-65208
- GNIS feature ID: 2404613
- Website: www.cityofrichlawn.com

Richlawn is a home rule-class city in eastern Jefferson County, Kentucky, United States. The population was 415 at the 2020 United States census. The population was 405 at the 2010 census, down from 454 at the 2000 census for a net loss of 39 residents in that time. It is surrounded by the larger city of St. Matthews.

== Geography ==
Richlawn is located in northern Jefferson County. U.S. Route 60 (Shelbyville Road) forms the southern boundary of the community. Downtown Louisville is 6 miles (10 km) to the west.

According to the United States Census Bureau, Richlawn has a total area of 0.10 square miles (0.26 km^{2}), all land.

== Demographics ==
Historical population
Census	Pop.	Note	%±
1950	655		—
1960	649		−0.9%
1970	578		−10.9%
1980	485		−16.1%
1990	435		−10.3%
2000	454		4.4%
2010	405		−10.8%
2020	415		2.5%
U.S. Decennial Census

As of the census of 2000, there were 454 people, 194 households, and 135 families residing in the city. The population density was 4,447.2 inhabitants per square mile (1,717.1/km^{2}). There were 198 housing units at an average density of 1,939.5 per square mile (748.8/km^{2}). The racial makeup of the city was 96.48% White, 2.20% African American, 0.44% Native American, 0.22% Asian, 0.22% from other races, and 0.44% from two or more races. Hispanic or Latino of any race were 2.42% of the population.

There were 194 households, out of which 28.9% had children under the age of 18 living with them, 61.9% were married couples living together, 6.7% had a female householder with no husband present, and 30.4% were non-families. 26.8% of all households were made up of individuals, and 8.2% had someone living alone who was 65 years of age or older. The average household size was 2.34 and the average family size was 2.84.

In the city, the population was spread out, with 22.0% under the age of 18, 3.3% from 18 to 24, 32.4% from 25 to 44, 27.5% from 45 to 64, and 14.8% who were 65 years of age or older. The median age was 38 years. For every 100 females, there were 100.0 males. For every 100 females age 18 and over, there were 91.4 males.

The median income for a household in the city was $66,071, and the median income for a family was $75,000. Males had a median income of $52,083 versus $36,875 for females. The per capita income for the city was $29,429. None of the families and 0.4% of the population were living below the poverty line, including no under eighteens and none of those over 64.

== Government ==
The current mayor of Richlawn is Matthew Broztege.
