= Rubbertown, Louisville =

Neighborhood of Louisville, Kentucky, US

Coordinates: 38°13′07″N 85°50′12″W

Rubbertown is a neighborhood of Louisville, Kentucky, located along the Ohio River. During World War II, it became the home of many industrial plants which remained after the war and led to its name. Its largest businesses include American Synthetic Rubber, Borden Chemical, DuPont Dow Elastomers, Noveon, Dow Chemical (formerly Rohm and Haas), and Zeon Chemicals.

== History ==
The Rubbertown industrial complex was created with construction by Standard Oil of Kentucky, who built an oil refinery in the area in 1918. Two other companies would come to the area for similar business in the 1930s, Aetna Oil and Louisville Refinery. These refineries were producers of fuel, gasoline, kerosene, naphtha, oil, and petroleum coke. These refineries have since been torn down and replaced by petroleum terminals. From 1924 to 1959, Bond Brothers, the largest railroad tie manufacturer in the United States, had operations in the area.

=== World War II ===
Upon the arrival of World War II, Rubbertown exploded with activity. In 1941, the U.S. Office of War Production, contracted with National Carbide, constructed a calcium carbide/acetylene gas plant. They were also involved with the B.F. Goodrich Corporation to build an adjacent plant. A company known as E. I. du Pont de Nemours and Company (later to become DuPont) was also contracted in 1941, but they built a Neoprene synthetic rubber plant.

Later on in 1945, Union Carbide built a plant in the complex to manufacture butadiene from grain alcohol that was piped to Rubbertown from distilleries in Louisville. Also in that year, a consortium of five tire companies known as National Synthetic Rubber opened a plant to make styrene-butadiene rubber for tires needed in the war effort.

=== Mid-20th century ===
For many years after the war, the federal government would continue to operate the styrene-butadiene rubber plant, up until 1955. In that year, the plant was auctioned off to 20 rubber companies. Also in that year, DuPont built a Freon production block next to its Neoprene plant. The company would also add an additional unit to manufacture vinyl fluoride.

In 1961, the Union Carbide plant was sold to Rohm and Haas to create acrylic plastic and such products. In 1979, Borden Chemical Inc. opened a building to produce formaldehyde, urea-formaldehyde resins, phenolic resins, and adhesives.

== Modern industry ==
Rubbertown is host to 11 large chemical plants, the largest source of industrial emissions in the Jefferson County area. The Rubbertown area accounts for 42% of air emissions in Jefferson County.

Since the area is a potential health issue to residents, in recent years it has come under attack by various organizations in the community. As a result of increasing pollution the Rubbertown Emergency Action (REACT) group was established in April 2003 as a campaign of the Justice Resource Center. The group consists of Rubbertown residents who believe that clean air is a human right and use legislative, judicial and political action to improve air conditions. REACT became an independent grassroots organization later that year. REACT is campaigning for:

- Strong laws to stop toxic air pollution from chemical plants;
- The protection of residents in the event of a leak, fire or explosion in a chemical plant or railcar;
- Full disclosure and easy access to information concerning the impact of Rubbertown industry emissions on residents living nearby.

For many years, residents of western Louisville and nearby areas in Jefferson County had complained of health problems they attributed to air pollutant emissions from the many industrial facilities in Rubbertown. Citizen organizations such as ReACT (Rubbertown Emergency Action) have formed to advocate for more assessment and control of air emissions. The West Jefferson County Community Task Force (WJCCTF) was established by the Louisville Metro Department of Public Health & Wellness (then the Jefferson County Department of Health) to identify problems in the area.

Between April 2000 and April 2001, the APCD, the U.S. Environmental Protection Agency, the Kentucky Division for Air Quality, and the University of Louisville worked with the WJCCTF to conduct an air monitoring study of a large number of toxic air pollutants at twelve sites in western Louisville and Jefferson County. The purpose of the study was to determine if residents of the area were being exposed to airborne concentrations of toxic air pollutants that may pose unacceptable risks to human health. Since the end of that one-year study, the university and WJCCTF have continued to sample volatile organic compounds at some of the sites.

In 2002, EPA Region 4 independently performed an analysis of other data to develop a county-by-county Air Toxics Relative Risk Screening Analysis, which indicated that Jefferson County had the highest risk of the Southeast region.

The West Louisville Air Toxics Study Risk Management Plan, Part 1: Process and Framework was issued in April 2003. The Risk Management Plan establishes the process to identify the sources of the chemicals which are above target risk levels, the options which will be evaluated for the chemicals to lower their ambient concentrations and the elements of a risk communication plan and process to best inform the community on relevant issues and activities.

Sciences International, Inc. conducted a risk assessment of the air monitoring data collected in the study. The final West Louisville Air Toxics Risk Assessment Report, completed in October 2003, details the methods and findings of this assessment. Following the release of the report, the APCD began the process of developing a comprehensive regulatory package to address Louisville's toxic air pollution.

In September 2004, the APCD proposed the Strategic Toxic Air Reduction (STAR) Program for public review and comment. The STAR Program was ratified by the Louisville Metro Air Pollution Control Board in June 2005.

In response to these programs, many companies within Rubbertown began scaling down their operations. DuPont closed their neoprene production plant on March 1, 2008. This in turn caused Carbide Industries to cease production of acetylene which was piped directly to the DuPont plant.

On October 1, 2025, the Carbide Industries calcium carbide manufacturing plant suffered an explosion which is believed to have been caused when a calcium carbide furnace overflowed resulting in the calcium carbide hitting the ground and causing an explosion. The explosion and resulting fire did not result in any casualties; however, it resulted in severe damage to the second floor of the manufacturing plant. Despite this damage, the fire was confided to the second floor. Prior to the explosion, Carbide Industries had a history of major industrial incidents. These include an unrelated explosion in March 2011 which resulted in the deaths of two workers and the death of a third worker in 2018. These deaths were believed to have been caused by faulty electrical systems.
