= Hollow Creek, Kentucky =

- City
- Location of Hollow Creek in Jefferson County, Kentucky

- Location within the state of Kentucky Hollow Creek (the United States)
- Coordinates: 38°09′09″N 85°37′28″W
- Country: United States
- State: Kentucky
- County: Jefferson
- Incorporated: 1971

Area
  - Total: 0.23 sq mi (0.60 km^{2})
  - Land: 0.23 sq mi (0.60 km^{2})
  - Water: 0 sq mi (0.00 km^{2})
- Elevation: 633 ft (193 m)

Population (2020)
  - Total: 799
  - Density: 3,452.9/sq mi (1,333.18/km^{2})
- Time zone: UTC-5 (Eastern (EST))
  - Summer (DST): UTC-4 (EDT)
- ZIP Code: 40228
- FIPS code: 21-37576
- GNIS feature ID: 2404713

Hollow Creek is a home rule-class city in Jefferson County, Kentucky, United States. The population was 799 at the 2020 census.

== Geography ==
Hollow Creek is located in southern Jefferson County 12 miles (19 km) southeast of downtown Louisville.

According to the United States Census Bureau, the city has a total area of 0.23 square miles (0.60 km^{2}), all land.

== Demographics ==
Historical population
Census	Pop.	Note	%±
1980	1,023		—
1990	991		−3.1%
2000	815		−17.8%
2010	783		−3.9%
2020	799		2.0%
U.S. Decennial Census

As of the census of 2000, there were 815 people, 309 households, and 262 families residing in the city. The population density was 3,661.2 inhabitants per square mile (1,413.6/km^{2}). There were 315 housing units at an average density of 1,415.0 per square mile (546.3/km^{2}). The racial makeup of the city was 93.74% White, 4.54% African American, 0.74% Native American, and 0.98% from two or more races. Hispanic or Latino of any race were 0.49% of the population.

There were 309 households, out of which 28.5% had children under the age of 18 living with them, 76.1% were married couples living together, 6.1% had a female householder with no husband present, and 14.9% were non-families. 13.9% of all households were made up of individuals, and 6.1% had someone living alone who was 65 years of age or older. The average household size was 2.64 and the average family size was 2.89.

In the city, the population was spread out, with 20.9% under the age of 18, 5.5% from 18 to 24, 22.5% from 25 to 44, 33.3% from 45 to 64, and 17.9% who were 65 years of age or older. The median age was 46 years. For every 100 females, there were 98.8 males. For every 100 females age 18 and over, there were 97.9 males.

The median income for a household in the city was $67,875, and the median income for a family was $70,625. Males had a median income of $47,500 versus $26,250 for females. The per capita income for the city was $25,508. None of the families and 0.4% of the population were living below the poverty line, including no under eighteens and 1.6% of those over 64.
