= Moorland, Kentucky =

- City
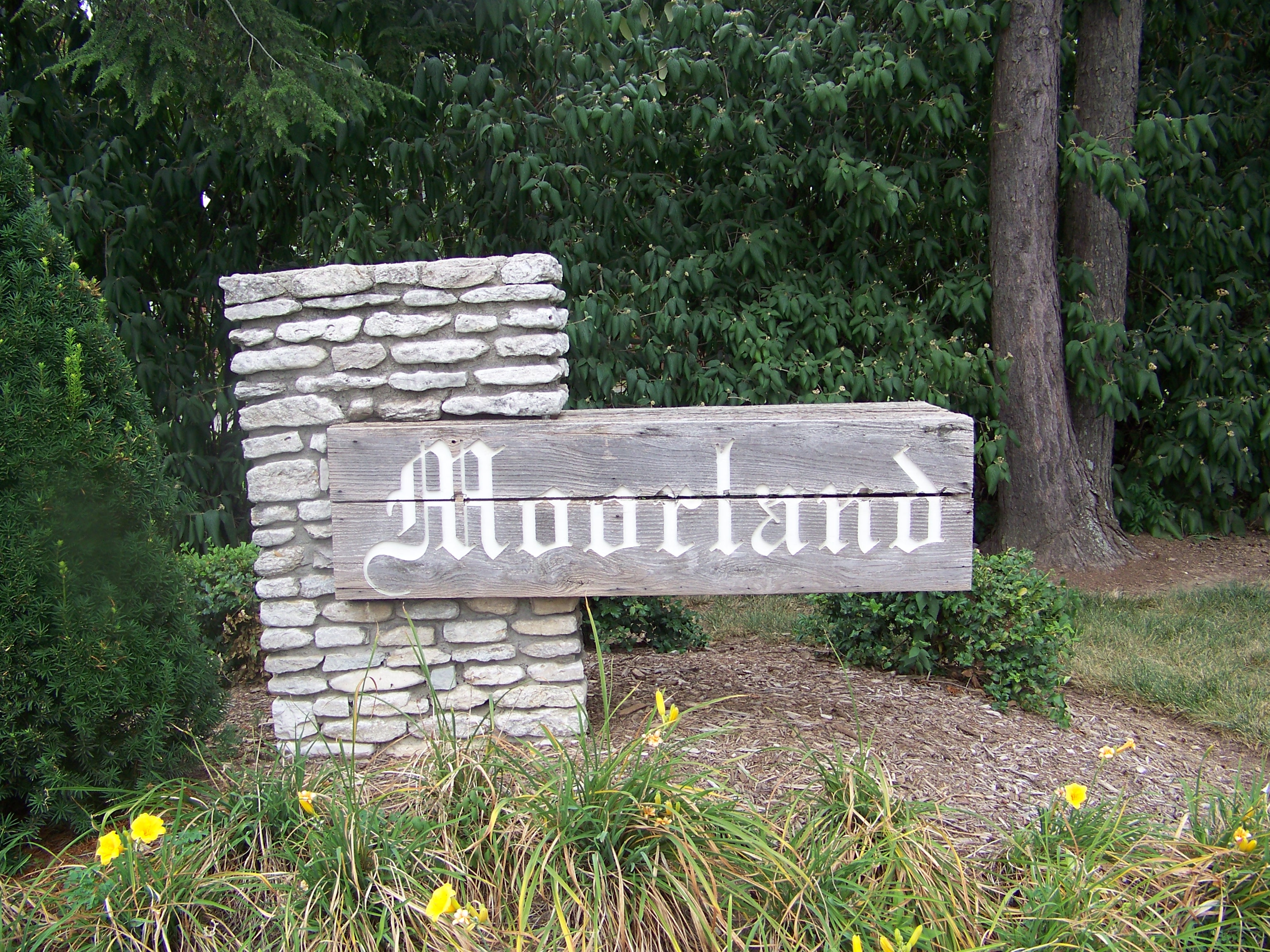
- Entry sign

- Location of Moorland in Jefferson County, Kentucky

- Location within the state of Kentucky Moorland (the United States)
- Coordinates: 38°16′22″N 85°34′48″W
- Country: United States
- State: Kentucky
- County: Jefferson
- Incorporated: 1959

Area
  - Total: 0.093 sq mi (0.24 km^{2})
  - Land: 0.093 sq mi (0.24 km^{2})
  - Water: 0 sq mi (0.00 km^{2})
- Elevation: 637 ft (194 m)

Population (2020)
  - Total: 433
  - Density: 4,611.9/sq mi (1,780.66/km^{2})
- Time zone: UTC-5 (Eastern (EST))
  - Summer (DST): UTC-4 (EDT)
- ZIP Code: 40223
- FIPS code: 21-53328
- GNIS feature ID: 2404298
- Website: https://cityofmoorland.com/

Moorland is a home rule-class city in Jefferson County, Kentucky, United States. As of the 2020 census, Moorland had a population of 433.

== Geography ==
Moorland is located in northeastern Jefferson County. It is bordered to the south, east, and west by Lyndon, and to the north by consolidated Louisville/Jefferson County. It is 11 miles (18 km) east of downtown Louisville.

According to the United States Census Bureau, the city has a total area of 0.09 square miles (0.24 km^{2}), all land.

== Demographics ==
Historical population
Census	Pop.	Note	%±
1960	599		—
1970	705		17.7%
1980	513		−27.2%
1990	467		−9.0%
2000	464		−0.6%
2010	431		−7.1%
2020	433		0.5%
U.S. Decennial Census

At the 2000 census there were 464 people in 206 households, including 127 families, in the city. The population density was 4,830.4 inhabitants per square mile (1,865.0/km^{2}). There were 213 housing units at an average density of 2,217.4 per square mile (856.1/km^{2}). The racial makeup of the city was 91.81% White, 4.74% African American, 0.43% Asian, 0.22% from other races, and 2.80% from two or more races. Hispanic or Latino of any race were 0.65%.

Of the 206 households 29.1% had children under the age of 18 living with them, 44.2% were married couples living together, 13.1% had a female householder with no husband present, and 38.3% were non-families. 32.5% of households were one person and 4.4% were one person aged 65 or older. The average household size was 2.25 and the average family size was 2.85.

The age distribution was 24.1% under the age of 18, 5.8% from 18 to 24, 38.4% from 25 to 44, 24.4% from 45 to 64, and 7.3% 65 or older. The median age was 36 years. For every 100 females, there were 100.9 males. For every 100 females age 18 and over, there were 90.3 males.

The median household income was $40,469 and the median family income was $45,096. Males had a median income of $35,625 versus $25,625 for females. The per capita income for the city was $18,092. About 1.4% of families and 1.6% of the population were below the poverty line, including 1.6% of those under age 18 and none of those age 65 or over.

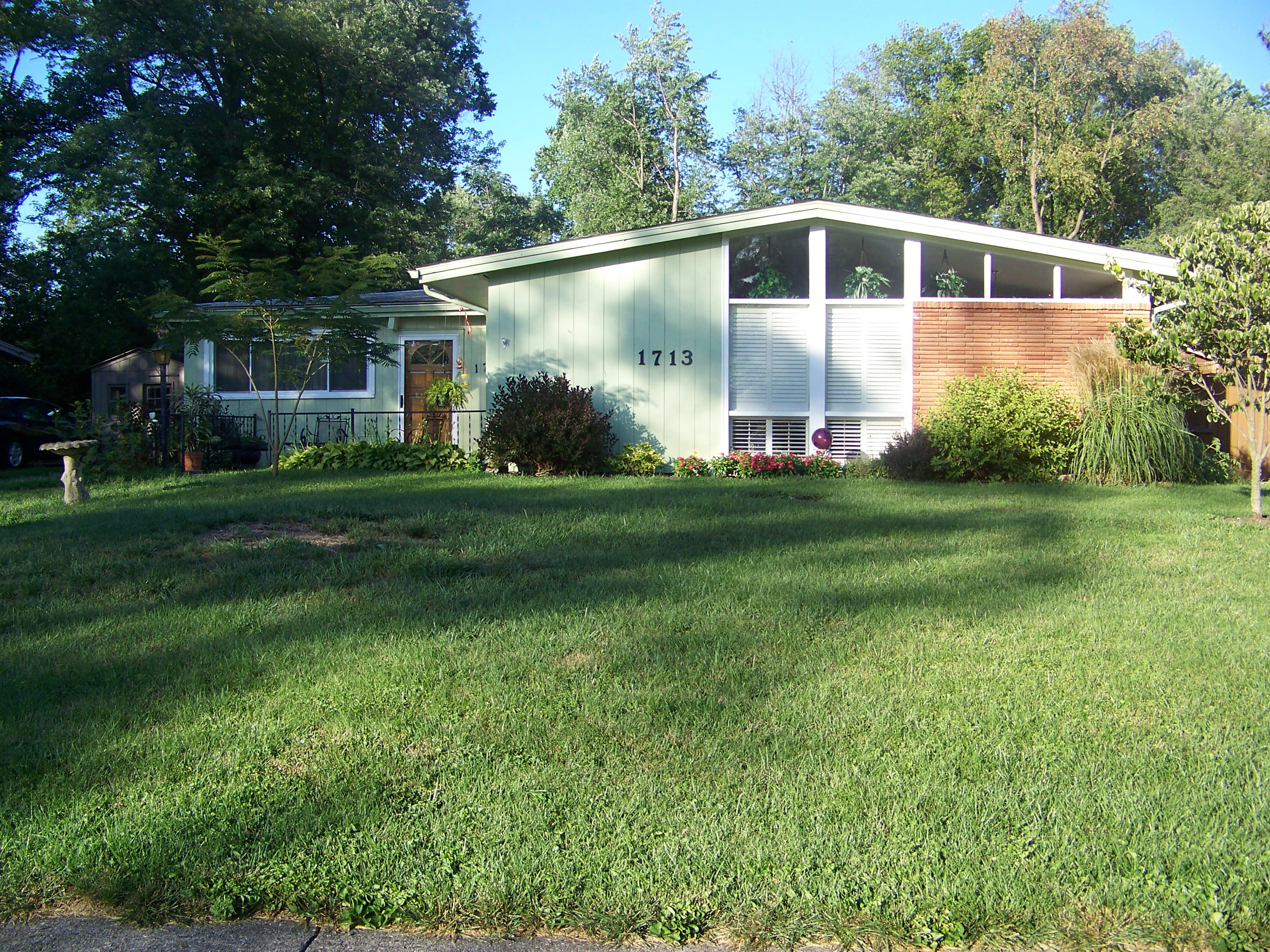
Redwood home in Moorland

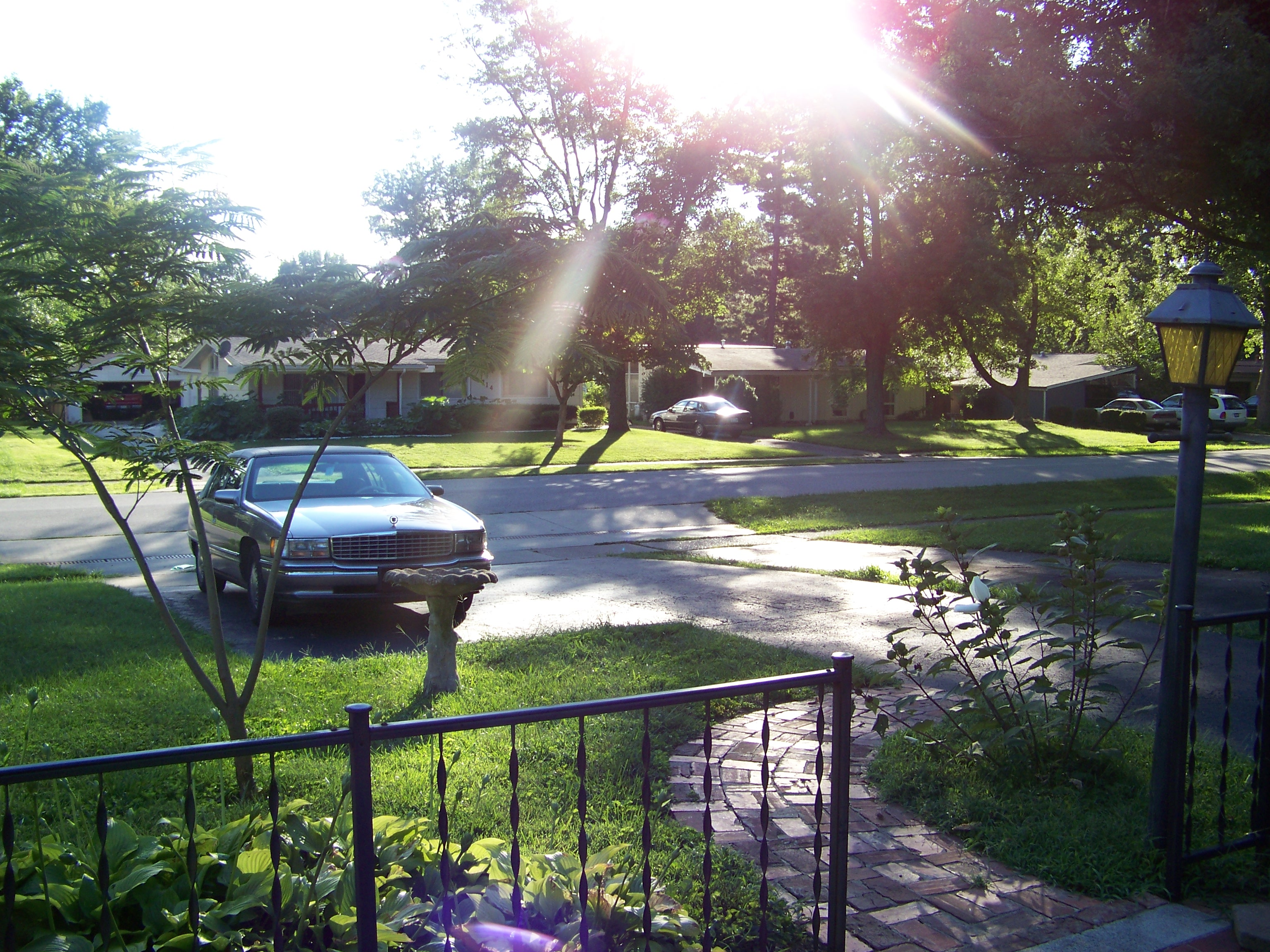
Quiet day in Moorland
