= Tucker Station, Louisville =

Neighborhood in Louisville, Kentucky

Coordinates: 38°12′01″N 85°31′40″W

Tucker Station is a neighborhood of Louisville, Kentucky centered along Tucker Station Road and Rehl Road. It is named after Hazael Tucker, a land owner and was a railway stop.

The town had a post office from 1897 to 1907.
