= Thornhill, Kentucky =

- City
- Location of Thornhill in Jefferson County, Kentucky

- Location within the state of Kentucky Thornhill (the United States)
- Coordinates: 38°17′16″N 85°37′28″W
- Country: United States
- State: Kentucky
- County: Jefferson

Area
  - Total: 0.046 sq mi (0.12 km^{2})
  - Land: 0.046 sq mi (0.12 km^{2})
  - Water: 0 sq mi (0.00 km^{2})
- Elevation: 568 ft (173 m)

Population (2020)
  - Total: 185
  - Density: 4,071.6/sq mi (1,572.06/km^{2})
- Time zone: UTC-5 (Eastern (EST))
  - Summer (DST): UTC-4 (EDT)
- ZIP Code: 40222
- FIPS code: 21-76380
- GNIS feature ID: 2405587
- Website: cityofthornhill.org

Thornhill is a home rule-class city in Jefferson County, Kentucky, United States. The population was 178 at the 2010 census.

== Geography ==
Thornhill is located in northeastern Jefferson County. Kentucky Route 22 (Brownsboro Road) forms the southern boundary of the city. Thornhill is 1 mile (1.6 km) northeast of Northfield and 8 miles (13 km) northeast of downtown Louisville.

According to the United States Census Bureau, Thornhill has a total area of 0.05 square miles (0.12 km^{2}), all land.

== Demographics ==
Historical population
Census	Pop.	Note	%±
1980	233		—
1990	146		−37.3%
2000	175		19.9%
2010	178		1.7%
2020	185		3.9%
U.S. Decennial Census

At the 2000 census there were 175 people, 72 households, and 60 families living in the city. The population density was 3,810.4 inhabitants per square mile (1,471.2/km^{2}). There were 75 housing units at an average density of 1,633.0 per square mile (630.5/km^{2}). The racial makeup of the city was 99.43% White and 0.57% Native American. Of the 72 households, 29.2% had children under the age of 18 living with them, 73.6% were married couples living together, 8.3% had a female householder with no husband present, and 15.3% were non-families. 13.9% of households were one person and 6.9% were one person aged 65 or older. The average household size was 2.43 and the average family size was 2.66.

The age distribution was 21.1% under the age of 18, 2.9% from 18 to 24, 20.6% from 25 to 44, 31.4% from 45 to 64, and 24.0% 65 or older. The median age was 47 years. For every 100 females, there were 92.3 males. For every 100 females age 18 and over, there were 91.7 males.

The median household income was $84,326 and the median family income was $100,391. Males had a median income of $61,000 versus $48,125 for females. The per capita income for the city was $38,698. None of the population or families were below the poverty line.
