= Whitner, Louisville =

Neighborhood in Louisville, Kentucky

Coordinates: 38°11′16″N 85°41′36″W

Whitner is a neighborhood of Louisville, Kentucky located along Bishop Lane and Pinewood Road.
