= St. Dennis, Louisville =

St. Dennis
- Census-designated place
- St. Dennis, Jefferson County, Kentucky
- Location within the state of Kentucky
- Coordinates: 38°11′18″N 85°50′45″W
- Country: United States
- State: Kentucky
- County: Jefferson
- City: Louisville

Area
  - Total: 2.6 sq mi (6.7 km^{2})
  - Land: 2.6 sq mi (6.7 km^{2})
  - Water: 0.0 sq mi (0 km^{2})

Population (2000)
  - Total: 9,177
  - Density: 3,500/sq mi (1,400/km^{2})
- Time zone: UTC-5 (Eastern (EST))
  - Summer (DST): UTC-4 (EDT)
- Area code: 502

St. Dennis is a former census-designated place in western Jefferson County, Kentucky, United States. The population was 9,177 at the 2000 census. In 2003, the area was consolidated into the new Louisville Metro due to the merger of the Jefferson County and Louisville governments into one entity, thus St. Dennis remains as a unique neighborhood within Louisville.

== Geography ==
St. Dennis is located at 38°11′18″N 85°50′45″W (38.1884, -85.8458).

According to the United States Census Bureau, the CDP has a total area of 6.8 km^{2} (2.6 sq mi), all land.

== Demographics ==
Historical population
Census	Pop.	Note	%±
1990	10,326		—
2000	9,177		−11.1%

As of the census of 2000, there were 9,177 people, 3,725 households, and 2,559 families residing in the CDP. The population density was 1,352.4 people /km^{2} (3,503 people/mi^{2}). There were 4,060 housing units at an average density of 598.3 units /km^{2} (1,550 units/mi^{2}). The racial makeup of the CDP was 63.75% White, 33.92% African American, 0.29% Native American, 0.32% Asian, 0.01% Pacific Islander, 0.48% from other races, and 1.23% from two or more races. Hispanic or Latino of any race were 1.21% of the population.

There were 3,725 households, out of which 31.4% had children under the age of 18 living with them, 44.7% were married couples living together, 19.2% had a female householder with no husband present, and 31.3% were non-families. 27.5% of all households were made up of individuals, and 10.5% had someone living alone who was 65 years of age or older. The average household size was 2.46 and the average family size was 2.97.

In the CDP, the population was spread out, with 25.7% under the age of 18, 8.6% from 18 to 24, 28.8% from 25 to 44, 23.1% from 45 to 64, and 13.9% who were 65 years of age or older. The median age was 37 years. For every 100 females, there were 88.9 males. For every 100 females age 18 and over, there were 84.3 males.

The median income for a household in the CDP was $33,782, and the median income for a family was $40,599. Males had a median income of $32,180 versus $21,774 for females. The per capita income for the CDP was $17,184. About 11.1% of families and 11.3% of the population were below the poverty line, including 15.3% of those under age 18 and 8.7% of those age 65 or over.
