= Fincastle, Kentucky =

- City
- Location of Fincastle in Jefferson County, Kentucky

- Location within the state of Kentucky Fincastle (the United States)
- Coordinates: 38°18′30″N 85°32′29″W
- Country: United States
- State: Kentucky
- County: Jefferson
- City of Fincastle: January 25, 1974

Government
  - Mayor: John Bell
  - Commissioner: Chauncey Mills
  - Commissioner: Gene Harris
  - Commissioner: Samuel Jackson
  - Commissioner: Jerry Gregory
  - City Clerk: Jean Reid

Area
  - Total: 0.21 sq mi (0.55 km^{2})
  - Land: 0.21 sq mi (0.55 km^{2})
  - Water: 0 sq mi (0.00 km^{2})
- Elevation: 719 ft (219 m)

Population (2020)
  - Total: 848
  - Density: 3,981.1/sq mi (1,537.13/km^{2})
- Time zone: UTC-5 (Eastern (EST))
  - Summer (DST): UTC-4 (EDT)
- ZIP Code: 40241
- FIPS code: 21-27262
- GNIS feature ID: 2403609
- Website: www.cityoffincastle.com

Fincastle is a home rule-class city in eastern Jefferson County, Kentucky, United States. As of the 2020 census, Fincastle had a population of 848.

== History ==
Fincastle was incorporated on January 25, 1974. According to the city's website, the name "is a historical relic from the formation of Kentucky County, Virginia. This county was the precursor to the Commonwealth of Kentucky and was formed from Fincastle County, Virginia, in 1776".

== Geography ==
Fincastle is located in northeastern Jefferson County. It is 15 miles (24 km) northeast of downtown Louisville and 2 miles (3 km) southwest of Oldham County.

According to the United States Census Bureau, Fincastle has a total area of 0.21 square miles (0.55 km^{2}), all land.

== Demographics ==
Historical population
| Census | Pop. | Note | %± |
|---|---|---|---|
| 1980 | 804 | | — |
| 1990 | 838 | | 4.2% |
| 2000 | 825 | | −1.6% |
| 2010 | 817 | | −1.0% |
| 2020 | 848 | | 3.8% |
U.S. Decennial Census

As of the census of 2000, there were 825 people, 295 households, and 243 families residing in the city. The population density was 3,890.9 inhabitants per square mile (1,502.3/km^{2}). There were 301 housing units at an average density of 1,419.6 per square mile (548.1/km^{2}). The racial makeup of the city was 62.18% White, 30.42% Black or African American, 0.61% Native American, 2.18% Asian, 0.73% from other races, and 3.88% from two or more races. Hispanic or Latino of any race were 1.21% of the population.

There were 295 households, out of which 46.1% had children under the age of 18 living with them, 67.1% were married couples living together, 12.2% had a female householder with no husband present, and 17.6% were non-families. 13.9% of all households were made up of individuals, and 2.0% had someone living alone who was 65 years of age or older. The average household size was 2.80 and the average family size was 3.11.

In the city, the population was spread out, with 30.4% under the age of 18, 5.3% from 18 to 24, 33.9% from 25 to 44, 25.7% from 45 to 64, and 4.6% who were 65 years of age or older. The median age was 34 years. For every 100 females, there were 102.7 males. For every 100 females age 18 and over, there were 92.6 males.

The median income for a household in the city was $66,477, and the median income for a family was $66,250. Males had a median income of $46,389 versus $30,446 for females. The per capita income for the city was $27,058. About 3.9% of families and 4.2% of the population were below the poverty line, including 5.2% of those under age 18 and 10.2% of those age 65 or over.

== Government ==
Fincastle has a legislative body composed of a Mayor and four Commissioners.

The city is presided over by Mayor John Bell. Stacey Ricci, Gene Harris, Kenneth Howson and Jerry Gregory serve as City Commissioners. The City Clerk is Jean Reid. Nathan Lindemyer serves as Treasurer, and the City Attorney is Michael Lawrence.
