= Cherry Wood =

Nature reserve in London

Coordinates: 51.3974°N 0.21461°W

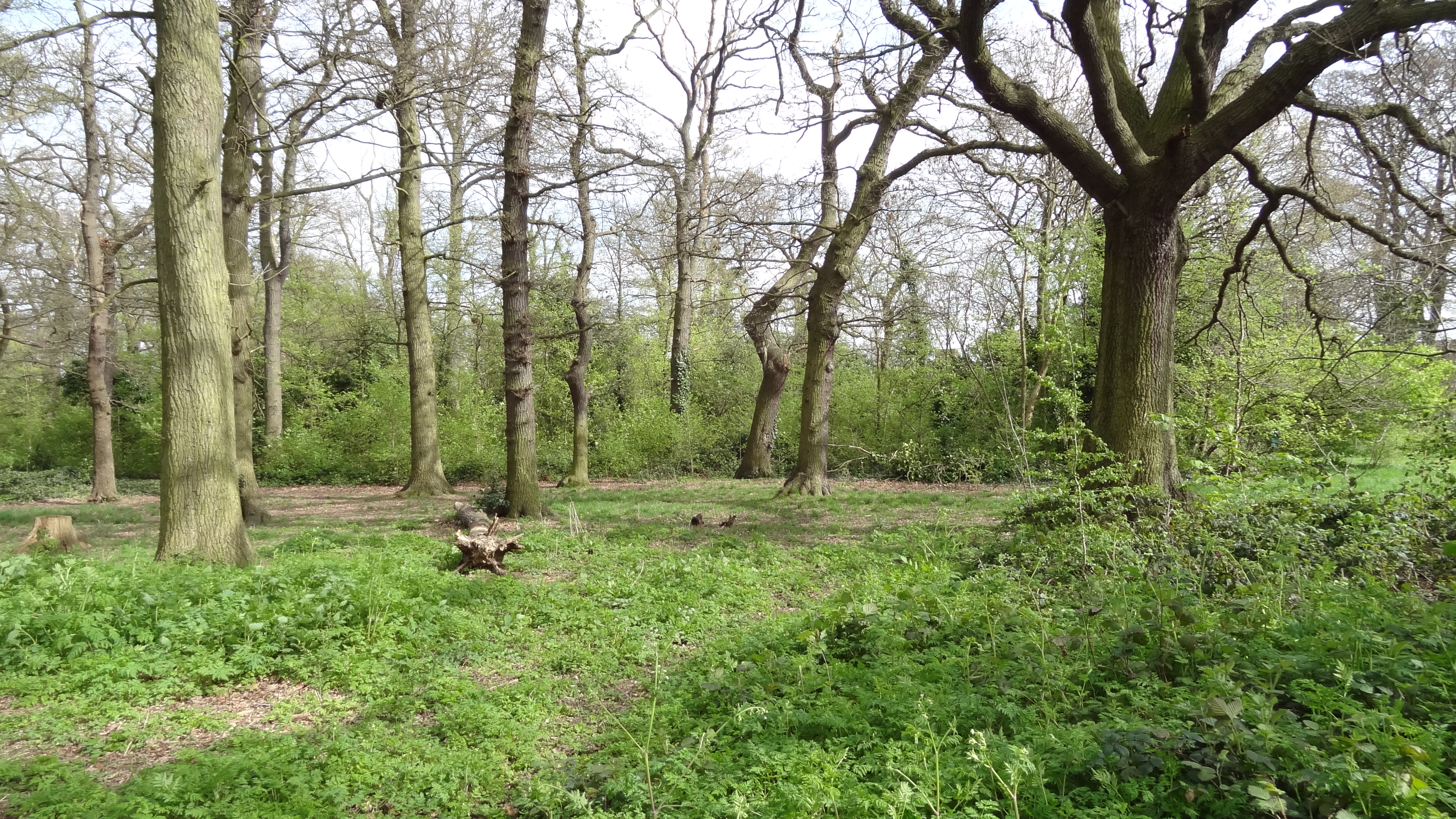
Trees in Cherry Wood

Cherry Wood is a 1.8 hectare Local Nature Reserve and Site of Borough Importance for Nature Conservation, Grade II, in Morden Park in the London Borough of Merton. It is owned by Merton Council and managed by the council together with the Friends of Cherry Wood.

The wood is a surviving fragment of a much larger wood shown on an 1837 map as Great Wood, and it is now surrounded by suburban housing. Until 1990 it was a rubbish dump, but it was then restored as a nature reserve. The main trees are pedunculate oak, ash and horse chestnut. Flowers include bluebells, ramsons and wood melick, and twenty-five species of bird have been recorded, including three species of woodpecker, chiffchaff and tawny owl.

There is access from Northernhay Walk and Shaldon Drive.
