= Norwood, Kentucky =

- City
- Location of Norwood in Jefferson County, Kentucky

- Location within the state of Kentucky Norwood (the United States)
- Coordinates: 38°15′07″N 85°36′39″W
- Country: United States
- State: Kentucky
- County: Jefferson
- Incorporated: 1975

Area
  - Total: 0.12 sq mi (0.30 km^{2})
  - Land: 0.12 sq mi (0.30 km^{2})
  - Water: 0 sq mi (0.00 km^{2})
- Elevation: 548 ft (167 m)

Population (2020)
  - Total: 379
  - Density: 3,221.1/sq mi (1,243.67/km^{2})
- Time zone: UTC-5 (Eastern (EST))
  - Summer (DST): UTC-4 (EDT)
- ZIP Code: 40222
- FIPS code: 21-56928
- GNIS feature ID: 2404403
- Website: norwoodky.com

Norwood is a home rule-class city in Jefferson County, Kentucky, United States. As of the 2020 census, Norwood had a population of 379.

== Geography ==
Norwood is located 8 miles (13 km) east of downtown Louisville. It is bordered to the west by St. Matthews, to the north and east by Lyndon, and otherwise by consolidated Louisville/Jefferson County. U.S. Route 60 (Shelbyville Road) forms the southern boundary of Norwood.

According to the United States Census Bureau, the city has a total area of 0.12 square miles (0.30 km^{2}), all land.

== Demographics ==
Historical population
Census	Pop.	Note	%±
1980	254		—
1990	372		46.5%
2000	395		6.2%
2010	370		−6.3%
2020	379		2.4%
U.S. Decennial Census

At the 2000 census there were 395 people in 156 households, including 114 families, in the city. The population density was 3,362.7 inhabitants per square mile (1,298.3/km^{2}). There were 165 housing units at an average density of 1,404.7 per square mile (542.4/km^{2}). The racial makeup of the city was 96.46% White, 1.01% African American, 0.76% Asian, 0.25% from other races, and 1.52% from two or more races. Hispanic or Latino of any race were 0.76%.

Of the 156 households 33.3% had children under the age of 18 living with them, 62.8% were married couples living together, 7.1% had a female householder with no husband present, and 26.9% were non-families. 22.4% of households were one person and 7.1% were one person aged 65 or older. The average household size was 2.53 and the average family size was 2.97.

The age distribution was 27.1% under the age of 18, 4.8% from 18 to 24, 26.6% from 25 to 44, 27.3% from 45 to 64, and 14.2% 65 or older. The median age was 40 years. For every 100 females, there were 107.9 males. For every 100 females age 18 and over, there were 94.6 males.

The median household income was $65,833 and the median family income was $71,250. Males had a median income of $61,406 versus $31,923 for females. The per capita income for the city was $29,092. About 5.5% of families and 4.4% of the population were below the poverty line, including 4.8% of those under age 18 and 14.7% of those age 65 or over.
