= Heritage Creek, Kentucky =

- City
- Location of Heritage Creek in Jefferson County, Kentucky

- Location within the state of Kentucky Heritage Creek (the United States)
- Coordinates: 38°05′44″N 85°36′44″W
- Country: United States
- State: Kentucky
- County: Jefferson

Area
  - Total: 0.45 sq mi (1.17 km^{2})
  - Land: 0.45 sq mi (1.17 km^{2})
  - Water: 0 sq mi (0.00 km^{2})
- Elevation: 640 ft (200 m)

Population (2020)
  - Total: 1,209
  - Density: 2,677.4/sq mi (1,033.75/km^{2})
- Time zone: UTC-5 (Eastern (EST))
  - Summer (DST): UTC-4 (EDT)
- ZIP Code: 40219
- FIPS code: 21-36102
- GNIS feature ID: 2404687
- Website: heritagecreekky.gov

Heritage Creek is a home rule-class city in Jefferson County, Kentucky, United States. As of the 2020 census, Heritage Creek had a population of 1,209.

== History ==
The city was incorporated by the state legislature as "Minor Lane Heights" in 1960. With expansion planned for Louisville International Airport to the north, the city was renamed in 2008 and moved from its location north of South Park View to a new location 5 miles (8 km) to the southeast.

== Geography ==
Heritage Creek is located in southern Jefferson County on either side of Cedar Creek Road, southeast of McNeely Park South. It is surrounded by consolidated Louisville/Jefferson County and is 16 miles (26 km) southeast of downtown Louisville.

According to the United States Census Bureau, the city has a total area of 0.45 square miles (1.16 km^{2}), all land.

== Demographics ==
Historical population
| Census | Pop. | Note | %± |
|---|---|---|---|
| 1960 | 152 | | — |
| 1970 | 2,217 | | 1,358.6% |
| 1980 | 1,882 | | −15.1% |
| 1990 | 1,675 | | −11.0% |
| 2000 | 2,560 | | 52.8% |
| 2010 | 1,076 | | −58.0% |
| 2020 | 1,209 | | 12.4% |
U.S. Decennial Census

As of the census of 2000, there were 1,435 people, 477 households, and 392 families residing in the city. The population density was 950.4 inhabitants per square mile (367.0/km^{2}). There were 494 housing units at an average density of 327.2 per square mile (126.3/km^{2}). The racial makeup of the city was 95.89% White, 1.74% African American, 1.11% Native American, 0.14% Asian, 0.07% Pacific Islander, and 1.05% from two or more races. Hispanic or Latino of any race were 0.35% of the population.

There were 477 households, out of which 41.7% had children under the age of 18 living with them, 56.8% were married couples living together, 17.4% had a female householder with no husband present, and 17.8% were non-families. 14.5% of all households were made up of individuals, and 3.8% had someone living alone who was 65 years of age or older. The average household size was 3.01 and the average family size was 3.24.

In the city, the population was spread out, with 30.7% under the age of 18, 8.6% from 18 to 24, 33.6% from 25 to 44, 21.4% from 45 to 64, and 5.8% who were 65 years of age or older. The median age was 32 years. For every 100 females, there were 102.1 males. For every 100 females age 18 and over, there were 101.4 males.

The median income for a household in the city was $37,955, and the median income for a family was $38,750. Males had a median income of $29,375 versus $23,063 for females. The per capita income for the city was $14,580. About 10.0% of families and 13.4% of the population were below the poverty line, including 21.3% of those under age 18 and 8.1% of those age 65 or over.
