= Sylvania, Louisville =

Neighborhood in Louisville, Kentucky

Sylvania is a neighborhood of Louisville, Kentucky located near Terry Road along Sylvania Road.

== Geography ==
Sylvania is located at 38°9′19″N 85°52′11″W.
