= Keeneland, Lyndon, Kentucky =

Keeneland
- Lyndon neighborhood
- Location within the state of Kentucky
- Coordinates: 38°16′34″N 85°33′59″W
- Country: United States
- State: Kentucky
- County: Jefferson

Area
  - Total: 0.077 sq mi (0.2 km^{2})
  - Land: 0.077 sq mi (0.2 km^{2})
  - Water: 0 sq mi (0.0 km^{2})
- Elevation: 673 ft (205 m)

Population (2000)
  - Total: 383
  - Density: 4,995/sq mi (1,928.7/km^{2})
- Time zone: UTC-5 (Eastern (EST))
  - Summer (DST): UTC-4 (EDT)
- FIPS code: 21-41734
- GNIS feature ID: 0495594

Keeneland is also the name of a thoroughbred horse racing and sales complex in Lexington, Kentucky; for this complex, see Keeneland.

Keeneland is a former city in Jefferson County, Kentucky, United States, that was dissolved on January 1, 2001, and annexed by the neighboring City of Lyndon. Keeneland is now a neighborhood of Lyndon and also a part of Louisville Metro.

== Geography ==
Keeneland is located at 38°16′34″N 85°33′59″W (38.276020, -85.566448).

According to the United States Census Bureau, the city has a total area of 0.1 square miles (0.26 km^{2}), all of it land.

== Demographics ==
As of the census of 2000, there were 383 people, 156 households, and 104 families residing in the city. The population density was 4,995.3 inhabitants per square mile (1,928.7/km^{2}). There were 157 housing units at an average density of 2,047.7 per square mile (790.6/km^{2}). The racial makeup of the city was 95.56% White, 1.83% African American, 0.26% Asian, 0.52% from other races, and 1.83% from two or more races. Hispanic or Latino of any race were 1.57% of the population.

There were 156 households, out of which 35.3% had children under the age of 18 living with them, 52.6% were married couples living together, 14.1% had a female householder with no husband present, and 32.7% were non-families. 27.6% of all households were made up of individuals, and 9.0% had someone living alone who was 65 years of age or older. The average household size was 2.46 and the average family size was 3.03.

In the city the population was spread out, with 27.2% under the age of 18, 7.3% from 18 to 24, 36.0% from 25 to 44, 21.1% from 45 to 64, and 8.4% who were 65 years of age or older. The median age was 33 years. For every 100 females, there were 85.9 males. For every 100 females age 18 and over, there were 83.6 males.

The median income for a household in the city was $39,063, and the median income for a family was $41,667. Males had a median income of $28,500 versus $23,125 for females. The per capita income for the city was $18,248. About 6.9% of families and 6.8% of the population were below the poverty line, including 2.1% of those under age 18 and 9.3% of those age 65 or over.
