= Valley Gardens, Louisville =

Neighborhood in Louisville, Kentucky

Valley Gardens is a neighborhood of Louisville, Kentucky, in the United States. It is centered along Johnsontown Road and Terry Road.

== Geography ==
Valley Gardens, Louisville is located at 38°7′17″N 85°52′29″W.
