= Seatonville, Louisville =

Neighborhood in Louisville, Kentucky

Coordinates: 38°07′51″N 85°30′51″W

Seatonville is a neighborhood of Louisville, Kentucky located along Seatonville Road and Echo Trail.
