= Green Spring, Kentucky =

- City
- Location of Green Spring in Jefferson County, Kentucky

- Location within the state of Kentucky Green Spring (the United States)
- Coordinates: 38°18′59″N 85°36′50″W
- Country: United States
- State: Kentucky
- County: Jefferson

Area
  - Total: 0.27 sq mi (0.69 km^{2})
  - Land: 0.27 sq mi (0.69 km^{2})
  - Water: 0 sq mi (0.00 km^{2})
- Elevation: 607 ft (185 m)

Population (2020)
  - Total: 711
  - Density: 2,666/sq mi (1,029.2/km^{2})
- Time zone: UTC-5 (Eastern (EST))
  - Summer (DST): UTC-4 (EDT)
- ZIP Code: 40241
- FIPS code: 21-32986
- GNIS feature ID: 2403737
- Website: www.cityofgreenspring.com

Green Spring is a home rule-class city in Jefferson County, Kentucky, United States. As of the 2020 census, Green Spring had a population of 711.

It was formally incorporated by the state assembly in 1974.

== Geography ==
Green Spring is located in northern Jefferson County. It is bordered to the north by Prospect and on all other sides by consolidated Louisville/Jefferson County. Interstate 265 (Gene Snyder Freeway) forms the northern border of the city. Downtown Louisville is 11 miles (18 km) to the southwest.

According to the United States Census Bureau, Green Spring has a total area of 0.27 square miles (0.7 km^{2}), all land.

== Demographics ==
Historical population
Census	Pop.	Note	%±
1980	634		—
1990	768		21.1%
2000	759		−1.2%
2010	715		−5.8%
2020	711		−0.6%
U.S. Decennial Census

As of the census of 2000, there were 759 people, 255 households, and 239 families residing in the city. The population density was 2,901.9 inhabitants per square mile (1,120.4/km^{2}). There were 257 housing units at an average density of 982.6 per square mile (379.4/km^{2}). The racial makeup of the city was 93.41% White, 3.43% African American, 2.37% Asian, and 0.79% from two or more races. Hispanic or Latino of any race were 0.79% of the population.

There were 255 households, out of which 41.6% had children under the age of 18 living with them, 87.1% were married couples living together, 6.3% had a female householder with no husband present, and 5.9% were non-families. 4.3% of all households were made up of individuals, and 1.2% had someone living alone who was 65 years of age or older. The average household size was 2.98 and the average family size was 3.08.

In the city, the population was spread out, with 27.5% under the age of 18, 4.6% from 18 to 24, 21.3% from 25 to 44, 39.7% from 45 to 64, and 6.9% who were 65 years of age or older. The median age was 43 years. For every 100 females, there were 91.7 males. For every 100 females age 18 and over, there were 97.8 males.

The median income for a household in the city was $100,846, and the median income for a family was $101,499. Males had a median income of $72,000 versus $36,563 for females. The per capita income for the city was $37,458. None of the families and 0.1% of the population were living below the poverty line, including no under eighteens and none of those over 64.
