= Meadowlawn, Louisville =

Neighborhood in Louisville, Kentucky

Coordinates: 38°03′43″N 85°53′11″W

Meadowlawn is a neighborhood of Louisville, Kentucky centered along Dixie Highway (US 60) and Pendleton Road.
