= Meadowview Estates, Kentucky =

- City
- Location of Meadowview Estates in Jefferson County, Kentucky

- Location within the state of Kentucky Meadowview Estates (the United States)
- Coordinates: 38°13′22″N 85°38′07″W
- Country: United States
- State: Kentucky
- County: Jefferson
- Incorporated: 1954

Area
  - Total: 0.062 sq mi (0.16 km^{2})
  - Land: 0.062 sq mi (0.16 km^{2})
  - Water: 0 sq mi (0.00 km^{2})
- Elevation: 525 ft (160 m)

Population (2020)
  - Total: 178
  - Density: 2,841.9/sq mi (1,097.28/km^{2})
- Time zone: UTC-5 (Eastern (EST))
  - Summer (DST): UTC-4 (EDT)
- ZIP Code: 40220
- FIPS code: 21-51294
- GNIS feature ID: 2405059

Meadowview Estates is a home rule-class city in Jefferson County, Kentucky, United States. The population was 178 at the 2020 census,.

== Geography ==
The city is located in east-central Jefferson County, south of the Interstate 64 and Interstate 65 junction. It is 7 miles (11 km) southeast of downtown Louisville.

According to the United States Census Bureau, the city has a total area of 0.1 square mile (0.2 km^{2}), all land.

== Demographics ==
Historical population
Census	Pop.	Note	%±
1960	131		—
1970	139		6.1%
1980	212		52.5%
1990	259		22.2%
2000	422		62.9%
2010	363		−14.0%
2020	178		−51.0%
U.S. Decennial Census

As of the census of 2000, there were 422 people, 226 households, and 91 families residing in the city. The population density was 5,453.7 inhabitants per square mile (2,105.7/km^{2}). There were 248 housing units at an average density of 3,205.0 per square mile (1,237.5/km^{2}). The racial makeup of the city was 78.91% White, 18.01% African American, 0.24% Native American, 1.18% Asian, 1.42% from other races, and 0.24% from two or more races. Hispanic or Latino of any race were 2.61% of the population.

There were 226 households, out of which 11.5% had children under the age of 18 living with them, 30.1% were married couples living together, 7.1% had a female householder with no husband present, and 59.3% were non-families. 44.7% of all households were made up of individuals, and 20.4% had someone living alone who was 65 years of age or older. The average household size was 1.87 and the average family size was 2.64.

In the city, the population was spread out, with 12.6% under the age of 18, 16.6% from 18 to 24, 23.7% from 25 to 44, 21.3% from 45 to 64, and 25.8% who were 65 years of age or older. The median age was 44 years. For every 100 females, there were 83.5 males. For every 100 females age 18 and over, there were 81.8 males.

The median income for a household in the city was $39,688, and the median income for a family was $56,250. Males had a median income of $30,809 versus $24,583 for females. The per capita income for the city was $27,395. About 2.9% of families and 11.9% of the population were below the poverty line, including 12.7% of those under age 18 and 5.1% of those age 65 or over.
