= Jefferson County, Kentucky =

County in Kentucky, United States

- Consolidated city-county
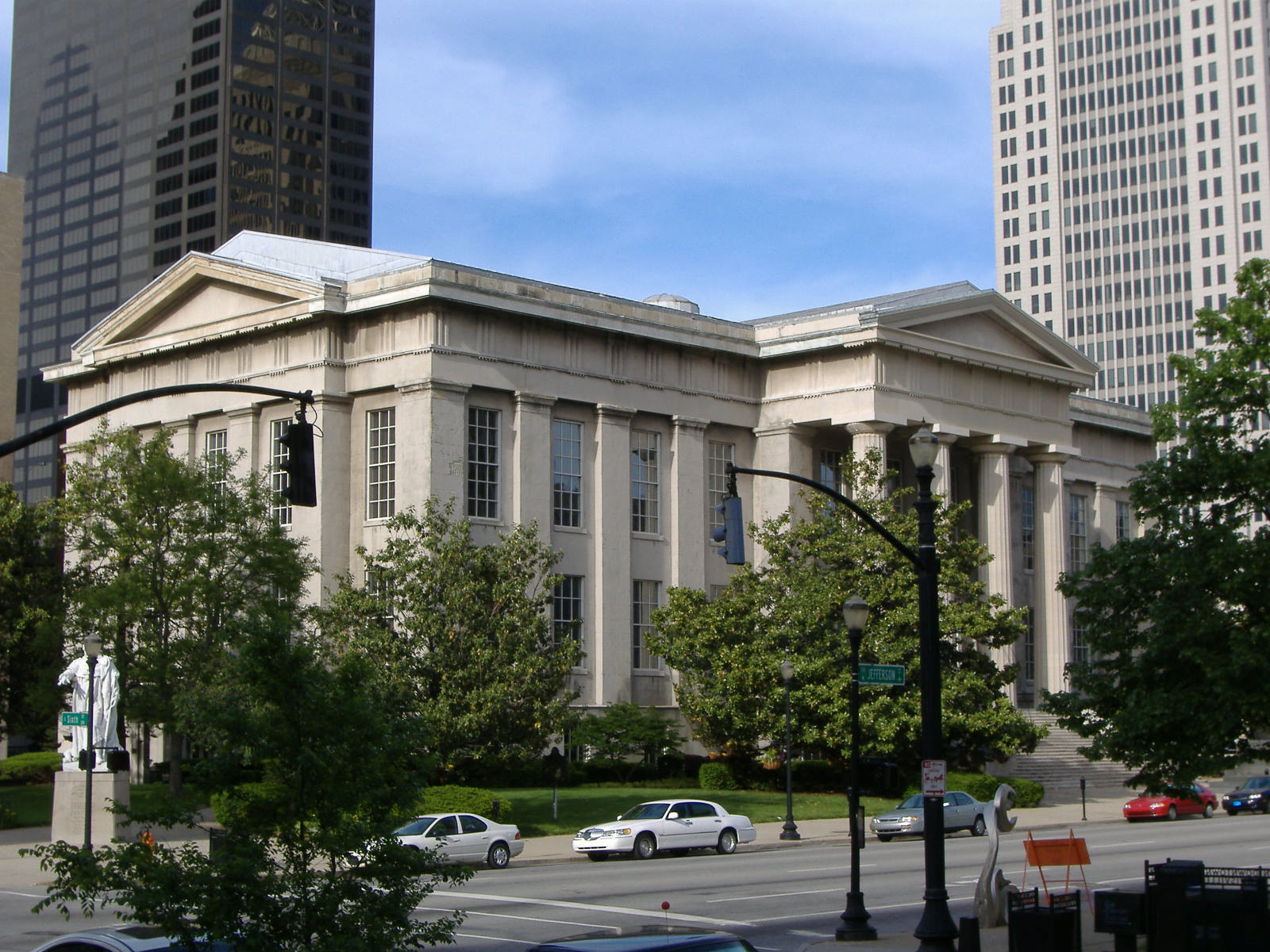
- Jefferson County Courthouse (now Louisville Metro Hall) in downtown Louisville

- Location within the U.S. state of Kentucky
- Coordinates: 38°11′N 85°40′W
- Country: United States
- State: Kentucky
- Founded: 1780
- Named for: Thomas Jefferson
- Seat: Louisville
- Largest city: Louisville

Government
  - Judge/Executive: Quennie Averette (D)

Area
  - Total: 398 sq mi (1,030 km^{2})
  - Land: 380 sq mi (980 km^{2})
  - Water: 17 sq mi (44 km^{2}) 4.3%

Population (2020)
  - Total: 782,969
  - Estimate (2025): 795,222 ▲
  - Density: 2,100/sq mi (800/km^{2})
- Time zone: UTC−5 (Eastern)
  - Summer (DST): UTC−4 (EDT)
- Congressional districts: 2nd, 3rd
- Website: louisvilleky.gov

Jefferson County is a county located in the north central portion of the U.S. state of Kentucky. As of the 2020 census, the population was 782,969. It is the most populous county in the commonwealth (with more than twice the population of second ranked Fayette County).

Since a city-county merger in 2003, the county's territory, population and government have been coextensive with the city of Louisville, which also serves as county seat. The administrative entity created by this merger is the Louisville/Jefferson County Metro Government, abbreviated to Louisville Metro.

Jefferson County is the anchor of the Louisville-Jefferson County, KY-IN Metropolitan Statistical Area, locally referred to as Kentuckiana.

== History ==
Jefferson County—originally Jefferson County, Virginia—was established by the Virginia General Assembly in June 1780, when it abolished and partitioned Kentucky County into three counties: Fayette, Jefferson and Lincoln. Named for Thomas Jefferson, who was governor of Virginia at the time, it was one of Kentucky's nine original counties on June 1, 1792.

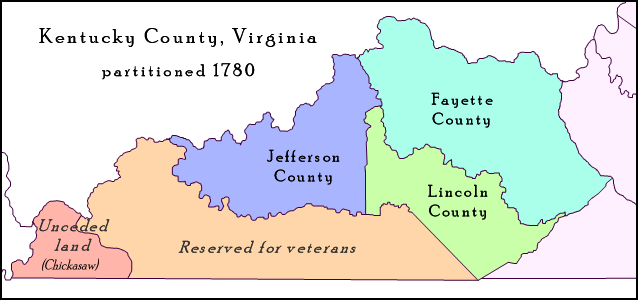
Jefferson County in 1780, as established by the Virginia General Assembly

In 1778, during the American Revolutionary War, George Rogers Clark's militia and 60 civilian settlers established the first American settlement in the county on Corn Island in the Ohio River, at the head of the Falls of the Ohio. They moved to the mainland the following year, establishing Louisville.

Richard Mentor Johnson, the 9th Vice President of the United States, was born in Jefferson County in 1780, while the family was living in a settlement along the Beargrass Creek.

The last major American Indian raid in present-day Jefferson County was the Chenoweth Massacre on July 17, 1789.

== Geography ==
According to the United States Census Bureau, the county has a total area of 398 square miles (1,030 km^{2}), of which 380 square miles (980 km^{2}) is land and 17 square miles (44 km^{2}) (4.3%) is water. The Ohio River forms its northern boundary with the state of Indiana.

The highest point is South Park Hill, elevation 902 feet (275 m), located in the southern part of the county. The lowest point is 383 feet (117 m) along the Ohio River just north of West Point.

=== Adjacent counties ===
- Bullitt County (south)
- Shelby County (east)
- Oldham County (northeast)
- Spencer County (southeast)
- Hardin County (southwest)
- Clark County, Indiana (north)
- Harrison County, Indiana (west)
- Floyd County, Indiana (northwest)

== Demographics ==
Historical population
Census	Pop.	Note	%±
1790	4,765		—
1800	8,754		83.7%
1810	13,399		53.1%
1820	20,768		55.0%
1830	23,979		15.5%
1840	36,346		51.6%
1850	59,831		64.6%
1860	89,404		49.4%
1870	118,953		33.1%
1880	146,010		22.7%
1890	188,598		29.2%
1900	232,549		23.3%
1910	262,920		13.1%
1920	286,369		8.9%
1930	355,350		24.1%
1940	385,392		8.5%
1950	484,615		25.7%
1960	610,947		26.1%
1970	695,055		13.8%
1980	685,004		−1.4%
1990	664,937		−2.9%
2000	693,604		4.3%
2010	741,096		6.8%
2020	782,969		5.7%
2025 (est.)	795,222	▲	1.6%
U.S. Decennial Census; 1790–1960 1900–1990; 1990–2000 2010–2020

=== 2020 census ===
Jefferson County, Kentucky – Racial and Ethnic Composition (NH = Non-Hispanic) Note: the US Census treats Hispanic/Latino as an ethnic category. This table excludes Latinos from the racial categories and assigns them to a separate category. Hispanics/Latinos may be of any race.
Race / Ethnicity	Pop 2000	Pop 2010	Pop 2020	% 2000	% 2010	% 2020
White alone (NH)	530,056	522,561	490,251	76.42%	70.51%	62.61%
Black or African American alone (NH)	130,003	152,451	167,067	18.74%	20.57%	21.34%
Native American or Alaska Native alone (NH)	1,409	1,492	1,441	0.20%	0.20%	0.18%
Asian alone (NH)	9,562	16,171	26,944	1.38%	2.18%	3.44%
Pacific Islander alone (NH)	224	403	559	0.03%	0.05%	0.07%
Some Other Race alone (NH)	1,143	1,255	3,707	0.16%	0.17%	0.47%
Mixed Race/Multi-Racial (NH)	8,837	14,221	33,979	1.27%	1.92%	4.34%
Hispanic or Latino (any race)	12,370	32,542	59,021	1.78%	4.39%	7.54%
Total	693,604	741,096	782,969	100.00%	100.00%	100.00%

As of the 2020 census, the county had a population of 782,969. The median age was 38.7 years. 21.5% of residents were under the age of 18 and 16.8% of residents were 65 years of age or older. For every 100 females there were 94.0 males, and for every 100 females age 18 and over there were 91.3 males age 18 and over.

The racial makeup of the county was 63.8% White, 21.6% Black or African American, 0.3% American Indian and Alaska Native, 3.5% Asian, 0.1% Native Hawaiian and Pacific Islander, 3.4% from some other race, and 7.3% from two or more races. Hispanic or Latino residents of any race comprised 7.5% of the population.

98.4% of residents lived in urban areas, while 1.6% lived in rural areas.

There were 328,169 households in the county, of which 27.6% had children under the age of 18 living with them and 32.2% had a female householder with no spouse or partner present. About 32.9% of all households were made up of individuals and 11.9% had someone living alone who was 65 years of age or older.

There were 356,887 housing units, of which 8.0% were vacant. Among occupied housing units, 60.4% were owner-occupied and 39.6% were renter-occupied. The homeowner vacancy rate was 1.5% and the rental vacancy rate was 9.0%.

=== 2000 census ===
As of the census of 2000, there were 693,604 people, 287,012 households, and 183,113 families residing in the county. The population density was 1,801 per square mile (695/km^{2}). There were 305,835 housing units at an average density of 794 per square mile (307/km^{2}). The racial makeup of the county was 77.38% White, 18.88% Black or African American, 0.22% Native American, 1.39% Asian, 0.04% Pacific Islander, 0.68% from other races, and 1.42% from two or more races. 1.78% of the population were Hispanic or Latino of any race.

There were 287,012 households, out of which 29.60% had children under the age of 18 living with them, 45.20% were married couples living together, 14.70% had a female householder with no husband present, and 36.20% were non-families. 30.50% of all households were made up of individuals, and 10.30% had someone living alone who was 65 years of age or older. The average household size was 2.37 and the average family size was 2.97.

In the county, the population was spread out, with 24.30% under the age of 18, 8.90% from 18 to 24, 30.40% from 25 to 44, 22.80% from 45 to 64, and 13.50% who were 65 years of age or older. The median age was 37 years. For every 100 females, there were 91.60 males. For every 100 females age 18 and over, there were 87.60 males.

The median income for a household in the county was $54,357 (2018), and the median income for a family was $49,161 (2005). Males had a median income of $36,484 versus $26,255 for females (2005). The per capita income for the county was $31,980 (2018). About 14.8% of the population were below the poverty line, including 22.1% of those under age 18 and 8.2% of those age 65 or over (2018).

== Government and politics ==
United States presidential election results for Jefferson County, Kentucky
Year	Republican		Democratic		Third party(ies)	
Year	No.	%	No.	%	No.	%
1880	8,746	37.61%	13,970	60.08%	536	2.31%
1884	8,709	42.69%	11,266	55.23%	424	2.08%
1888	12,863	42.05%	17,535	57.32%	193	0.63%
1892	13,454	38.13%	20,919	59.29%	909	2.58%
1896	29,107	61.57%	16,707	35.34%	1,458	3.08%
1900	24,906	53.52%	21,107	45.36%	523	1.12%
1904	21,664	47.14%	22,781	49.57%	1,514	3.29%
1908	27,180	49.69%	26,186	47.87%	1,334	2.44%
1912	3,519	6.73%	24,100	46.08%	24,686	47.20%
1916	28,386	48.68%	28,840	49.46%	1,088	1.87%
1920	68,202	54.32%	56,046	44.64%	1,301	1.04%
1924	61,768	52.53%	50,409	42.87%	5,409	4.60%
1928	97,803	60.14%	64,472	39.65%	338	0.21%
1932	67,137	47.58%	72,402	51.31%	1,557	1.10%
1936	53,043	37.26%	85,748	60.23%	3,583	2.52%
1940	66,052	40.97%	94,710	58.75%	456	0.28%
1944	60,905	43.01%	80,236	56.66%	480	0.34%
1948	69,645	47.42%	70,756	48.18%	6,456	4.40%
1952	99,069	54.60%	81,642	44.99%	736	0.41%
1956	119,262	58.49%	83,483	40.94%	1,172	0.57%
1960	118,575	50.30%	117,180	49.70%	0	0.00%
1964	80,951	35.53%	146,023	64.09%	849	0.37%
1968	95,942	43.09%	90,242	40.53%	36,473	16.38%
1972	142,436	60.41%	88,143	37.39%	5,185	2.20%
1976	130,262	50.21%	122,731	47.31%	6,452	2.49%
1980	127,254	47.97%	125,844	47.44%	12,188	4.59%
1984	167,640	57.66%	122,133	42.01%	977	0.34%
1988	139,711	52.01%	127,936	47.63%	982	0.37%
1992	116,566	37.63%	152,728	49.30%	40,499	13.07%
1996	114,860	41.03%	144,207	51.52%	20,846	7.45%
2000	145,052	47.97%	149,901	49.58%	7,409	2.45%
2004	164,566	48.75%	170,158	50.41%	2,845	0.84%
2008	153,957	43.38%	196,435	55.34%	4,544	1.28%
2012	148,423	43.60%	186,181	54.69%	5,808	1.71%
2016	143,768	40.72%	190,836	54.05%	18,496	5.24%
2020	150,646	38.84%	228,358	58.87%	8,886	2.29%
2024	144,553	40.64%	203,070	57.09%	8,099	2.28%

Whenever possible, the metro government generally avoids any self-reference including the name "Jefferson County" and has even renamed the Jefferson County Courthouse as Metro Hall.

Prior to the 2003 merger, the head of local government was the County Judge/Executive, a post that still exists but now has few powers. The office is currently held by Queenie Averette.

Local government is effectively now led by the Mayor of Louisville Metro, Craig Greenberg.

Like most urban counties nationwide, Jefferson County is currently a Democratic stronghold. Jefferson County has voted for the Democratic candidate in every presidential election since 1992. In the 2019 gubernatorial election, it voted for Democrat Andy Beshear by a higher percentage than any other county in Kentucky, giving him 67% of the vote. The county voted "No" on 2022 Kentucky Amendment 2, an anti-abortion ballot measure, by 71% to 29%, outpacing its support of Joe Biden during the 2020 presidential election.

=== Elected officials ===
Elected officials as of January 6, 2026
U.S. House	Brett Guthrie (R)	KY 2
U.S. House	Morgan McGarvey (D)	KY 3
Ky. Senate	Lindsey Tichenor (R)	6
Ky. Senate	Aaron Reed (R)	7
Ky. Senate	Matthew Deneen (R)	10
Ky. Senate	Cassie Chambers Armstrong (D)	19
Ky. Senate	Karen Berg (D)	26
Ky. Senate	Gerald A. Neal (D)	33
Ky. Senate	Keturah Herron (D)	35
Ky. Senate	Julie Raque Adams (R)	36
Ky. Senate	Gary Clemons (D)	37
Ky. Senate	Michael J. Nemes (R)	38
Ky. House	Jared Bauman (R)	28
Ky. House	Chris Lewis (R)	29
Ky. House	Daniel Grossberg (D)	30
Ky. House	Susan Witten (R)	31
Ky. House	Tina Bojanowski (D)	32
Ky. House	Jason Nemes (R)	33
Ky. House	Sarah Stalker (D)	34
Ky. House	Lisa Willner (D)	35
Ky. House	John Hodgson (R)	36
Ky. House	Emily Callaway (R)	37
Ky. House	Rachel Roarx (D)	38
Ky. House	Nima Kulkarni (D)	40
Ky. House	Mary Lou Marzian (D)	41
Ky. House	Joshua Watkins (D)	42
Ky. House	Pamela Stevenson (D)	43
Ky. House	Beverly Chester-Burton (D)	44
Ky. House	Al Gentry (D)	46
Ky. House	Ken Fleming (R)	48

== Infrastructure ==
=== Major highways ===
- I-64
- I-65
- I-71
- I-264
- I-265
- US 31W
- US 42
- US 60
  - US 60 Alt.
- US 150
- KY 61
- KY 146
- KY 148
- KY 155
- KY 660
- KY 841
- KY 864
- KY 907
- KY 1020
- KY 1065
- KY 1447
- KY 1531
- KY 1694
- KY 1703
- KY 1747
- KY 1819
- KY 1865
- KY 1931
- KY 1932
- KY 1934
- KY 2052
- KY 3222

== Education ==
The public school districts for the county are: Jefferson County School District (JCPS) and Anchorage Independent School District. The Anchorage district only covers grades K-8; Anchorage district residents may attend JCPS or Oldham County Schools.

Kentucky School for the Blind, a state-operated school, is in Louisville.

== Communities ==
Since the formation of Louisville Metro on January 6, 2003, residents of the cities below also became citizens of the newly expanded Metro, but none of the incorporated places dissolved in the process. The functions formerly served by the county government for the towns were assumed by Louisville Metro. However, the former City of Louisville was effectively absorbed into the new city-county government.

- Anchorage
- Audubon Park
- Bancroft
- Barbourmeade
- Beechwood Village
- Bellemeade
- Bellewood
- Blue Ridge Manor
- Briarwood
- Broad Fields
- Broeck Pointe
- Brownsboro Farm
- Brownsboro Village
- Buechel †
- Cambridge
- Cherrywood Village
- Coldstream
- Creekside
- Crossgate
- Douglass Hills
- Druid Hills
- Fairdale †
- Fairmeade
- Fern Creek †
- Fincastle
- Fisherville
- Forest Hills
- Glenview Hills
- Glenview Manor
- Glenview
- Goose Creek
- Graymoor-Devondale
- Green Spring
- Heritage Creek
- Hickory Hill
- Highview †
- Hills and Dales
- Hollow Creek
- Hollyvilla
- Houston Acres
- Hurstbourne Acres
- Hurstbourne
- Indian Hills
- Jeffersontown
- Keeneland
- Kingsley
- Langdon Place
- Lincolnshire
- Louisville
- Lyndon
- Lynnview
- Manor Creek
- Maryhill Estates
- Meadow Vale
- Meadowbrook Farm
- Meadowview Estates
- Middletown
- Mockingbird Valley
- Moorland
- Murray Hill
- Newburg †
- Norbourne Estates
- Northfield
- Norwood
- Okolona †
- Old Brownsboro Place
- Parkway Village
- Penile
- Plantation
- Pleasure Ridge Park †
- Plymouth Village
- Poplar Hills *
- Prospect
- Richlawn
- Riverwood
- Rolling Fields
- Rolling Hills
- Seneca Gardens
- Shively
- South Park View *
- Spring Mill
- Spring Valley
- Springlee
- St. Dennis †
- St. Matthews
- St. Regis Park
- Strathmoor Manor
- Strathmoor Village
- Sycamore
- Ten Broeck
- Thornhill
- Valley Station †
- Watterson Park
- Waverly Hills
- Wellington
- West Buechel
- Westwood
- Whipps Millgate
- Wildwood
- Windy Hills
- Woodland Hills
- Woodlawn Park
- Worthington Hills

† Formerly a census-designated place in the county, but, in 2003, these places became, according to local media, neighborhoods within the city limits of Louisville Metro.
* Former home rule-class cities that were dissolved in 2025.

== See also ==
- List of counties in Kentucky
- Jefferson County Sunday School Association
- Louisville/Jefferson County metro government (balance), Kentucky
- National Register of Historic Places listings in Jefferson County, Kentucky
