= Kentucky's 3rd congressional district =

U.S. House district for Kentucky

Coordinates: 38°15′N 85°45′W

- Interactive map of district boundaries since January 3, 2023
- Representative: Morgan McGarvey; D–Louisville
- Distribution: 99.33% urban; 0.67% rural
- Population (2025): 757,446
- Median household income: $70,872
- Ethnicity: 61.9% White; 22.0% Black; 7.7% Hispanic; 4.4% Two or more races; 3.3% Asian; 0.7% other
- Cook PVI: D+10

Kentucky's 3rd congressional district is a congressional district in the U.S. state of Kentucky. It encompasses almost all of Louisville Metro, which, since the merger of 2003, is consolidated with Jefferson County, though other incorporated cities exist within the county, such as Shively and St. Matthews. The far eastern portions of Louisville Metro are part of the 2nd congressional district.

The district is currently represented by Democrat Morgan McGarvey. With a Cook Partisan Voting Index rating of D+10, it is the only Democratic district in Kentucky.

== Characteristics ==
The district's character is very different from the rest of Kentucky. It is entirely contained within Jefferson County, and in contrast to the rest of the state, it is urban and leans Democratic. It has the highest percentage of African Americans in the state, who are concentrated in and near Louisville. It is a cosmopolitan, diverse district, with major businesses, health care organizations and universities.

== Voter registration ==
On January 1, 2026, the district had 552,659 registered voters, who were registered with the following parties.

Party	Registration	
Party	Voters	%
Democratic	313,156	56.66
Republican	170,421	30.84
Independent	31,202	5.65
Libertarian	2,439	0.44
Green	543	0.10
Constitution	219	0.04
Socialist Workers	163	0.03
Reform	48	0.01
"Other"	34,468	6.24
Total	552,659	100.00

== Recent election results from statewide races ==
Year	Office	Results
2000	President	Gore 50% - 48%
2004	President	Kerry 51% - 49%
2008	President	Obama 56% - 43%
2012	President	Obama 57% - 43%
2016	President	Clinton 55% - 40%
2016	Senate	Gray 60% - 40%
2019	Governor	Beshear 68% - 30%
2019	Attorney General	Stumbo 61% - 39%
2020	President	Biden 60% - 38%
2020	Senate	McGrath 61% - 36%
2022	Senate	Booker 60% - 40%
2023	Governor	Beshear 71% - 29%
2023	Attorney General	Stevenson 63% - 37%
2023	Auditor of Public Accounts	Reeder 61% - 39%
2023	Secretary of State	Wheatley 59% - 41%
2023	Treasurer	Bowman 64% - 36%
2024	President	Harris 59% - 40%

== Composition ==
For the 118th and successive Congresses (based on redistricting following the 2020 census), the district contains all or portions of the following counties and communities:

Jefferson County (85)

Anchorage, Audubon Park, Bancroft, Barbourmeade, Beechwood Village, Bellemeade, Bellewood, Blue Ridge Manor, Briarwood, Broeck Pointe, Brownsboro Farm, Brownsboro Village, Cambridge, Coldstream, Creekside, Crossgate, Douglass Hills, Druid Hills, Fincastle, Forest Hills, Glenview, Glenview Hills, Glenview Manor, Goose Creek, Graymoor-Devondale, Green Spring, Heritage Creek, Hickory Hill, Hills and Dales, Hollow Creek, Hollyvilla, Houston Acres, Hurstbourne, Hurstbourne Acres, Indian Hills, Jeffersontown, Kingsley, Langdon Place, Lincolnshire, Louisville (part; also 2nd), Lyndon, Lynnview, Manor Creek, Maryhill Estates, Meadow Vale, Meadowbrook Farm, Meadowview Estates, Middletown (part; also 2nd), Mockingbird Valley, Moorland, Murray Hill, Norbourne Estates, Northfield, Norwood, Old Brownsboro Place, Parkway Village, Plantation, Poplar Hills, Prospect, Richlawn, Riverwood, Rolling Fields, Rolling Hills, Seneca Gardens, Shively, South Park View, Spring Mill, Spring Valley, St. Matthews, St. Regis Park, Strathmoor Manor, Strathmoor Village, Sycamore, Ten Broeck, Thornhill, Watterson Park, Wellington, West Buechel, Westwood, Whipps Millgate, Wildwood, Windy Hills, Woodland Hills, Woodlawn Park, Worthington Hills

== List of members representing the district ==
Member	Party	Years	Cong ress	Electoral history	Location
District created March 4, 1803
Matthew Walton (Springfield)	Democratic-Republican	March 4, 1803 – March 3, 1807	8th 9th	Elected in 1803. Re-elected in 1804. Retired.	1803–1813; Breckinridge, Bullitt, Green, Hardin, Jefferson, Nelson, and Washington counties
John Rowan (Louisville)	Democratic-Republican	March 4, 1807 – March 3, 1809	10th	Elected in 1806. Retired.	1803–1813; Breckinridge, Bullitt, Green, Hardin, Jefferson, Nelson, and Washington counties
Henry Crist (Shepherdsville)	Democratic-Republican	March 4, 1809 – March 3, 1811	11th	Elected in 1808. Retired.	1803–1813; Breckinridge, Bullitt, Green, Hardin, Jefferson, Nelson, and Washington counties
Stephen Ormsby (Louisville)	Democratic-Republican	March 4, 1811 – March 3, 1813	12th	Elected in 1810. Redistricted to the 8th district and lost re-election.	1803–1813; Breckinridge, Bullitt, Green, Hardin, Jefferson, Nelson, and Washington counties
Richard M. Johnson (Great Crossings)	Democratic-Republican	March 4, 1813 – March 3, 1819	13th 14th 15th	Redistricted from the 4th district and re-elected in 1812. Re-elected in 1814. Re-elected in 1816. Retired.	1813–1823; Boone, Campbell, Franklin, Gallatin, Harrison, Pendleton, and Scott counties
William Brown (Cynthiana)	Democratic-Republican	March 4, 1819 – March 3, 1821	16th	Elected in 1818. Retired.	1813–1823; Boone, Campbell, Franklin, Gallatin, Harrison, Pendleton, and Scott counties
John T. Johnson (Georgetown)	Democratic-Republican	March 4, 1821 – March 3, 1823	17th	Elected in 1820. Redistricted to the 5th district.	1813–1823; Boone, Campbell, Franklin, Gallatin, Harrison, Pendleton, and Scott counties
Henry Clay (Lexington)	Democratic-Republican	March 3, 1823 – March 3, 1825	18th 19th	Elected in 1822. Re-elected in 1824. Resigned to become U.S. Secretary of State.	1823–1833; Clark, Fayette, and Woodford counties
Henry Clay (Lexington)	Anti-Jacksonian	March 4, 1825 – March 6, 1825	18th 19th	Elected in 1822. Re-elected in 1824. Resigned to become U.S. Secretary of State.	1823–1833; Clark, Fayette, and Woodford counties
Vacant		March 6, 1825 – August 1, 1825	19th		1823–1833; Clark, Fayette, and Woodford counties
James Clark (Winchester)	Anti-Jacksonian	August 1, 1825 – March 3, 1831	19th 20th 21st	Elected to finish Clay's term and seated December 5, 1825. Re-elected in 1827. Re-elected in 1829. Renominated but declined.	1823–1833; Clark, Fayette, and Woodford counties
Chilton Allan (Winchester)	Anti-Jacksonian	March 4, 1831 – March 3, 1833	22nd	Elected in 1831. Redistricted to the 10th district.	1823–1833; Clark, Fayette, and Woodford counties
Christopher Tompkins (Glasgow)	Anti-Jacksonian	March 4, 1833 – March 3, 1835	23rd	Redistricted from the 10th district and re-elected in 1833. Retired to run for state representative.	1833–1843 [data missing]
Joseph R. Underwood (Bowling Green)	Anti-Jacksonian	March 4, 1835 – March 3, 1837	24th 25th 26th 27th	Elected in 1835. Re-elected in 1837. Re-elected in 1839. Re-elected in 1841. Retired.	1833–1843 [data missing]
Joseph R. Underwood (Bowling Green)	Whig	March 4, 1837 – March 3, 1843	24th 25th 26th 27th	Elected in 1835. Re-elected in 1837. Re-elected in 1839. Re-elected in 1841. Retired.	1833–1843 [data missing]
Henry Grider (Bowling Green)	Whig	March 4, 1843 – March 3, 1847	28th 29th	Elected in 1843. Re-elected in 1845. Retired.	1843–1853 [data missing]
Samuel Peyton (Hartford)	Democratic	March 4, 1847 – March 3, 1849	30th	Elected in 1847. Lost re-election.	1843–1853 [data missing]
Finis McLean (Elkton)	Whig	March 4, 1849 – March 3, 1851	31st	Elected in 1849. Retired.	1843–1853 [data missing]
Presley Ewing (Russellville)	Whig	March 4, 1851 – September 27, 1854	32nd 33rd	Elected in 1851. Re-elected in 1853. Died.	1843–1853 [data missing]
Presley Ewing (Russellville)	Whig	March 4, 1851 – September 27, 1854	32nd 33rd	Elected in 1851. Re-elected in 1853. Died.	1853–1863 [data missing]
Vacant		September 27, 1854 – December 4, 1854	33rd		1853–1863 [data missing]
Francis Bristow (Elkton)	Whig	December 4, 1854 – March 3, 1855	33rd	Elected to finish Ewing's term Lost re-election.	1853–1863 [data missing]
Warner Underwood (Bowling Green)	Know Nothing	March 4, 1855 – March 3, 1859	34th 35th	Elected in 1855. Re-elected in 1857. Retired.	1853–1863 [data missing]
Francis Bristow (Elkton)	Opposition	March 4, 1859 – March 3, 1861	36th	Elected in 1859. Retired.	1853–1863 [data missing]
Henry Grider (Bowling Green)	Union Democratic	March 4, 1861 – March 3, 1865	37th 38th 39th	Elected in 1861. Re-elected in 1863. Re-elected in 1865. Died.	1853–1863 [data missing]
Henry Grider (Bowling Green)	Union Democratic	March 4, 1861 – March 3, 1865	37th 38th 39th	Elected in 1861. Re-elected in 1863. Re-elected in 1865. Died.	1863–1873 [data missing]
Henry Grider (Bowling Green)	Democratic	March 4, 1865 – September 7, 1866	37th 38th 39th	Elected in 1861. Re-elected in 1863. Re-elected in 1865. Died.	1863–1873 [data missing]
Vacant		September 7, 1866 – December 3, 1866	39th		1863–1873 [data missing]
Elijah Hise (Russellville)	Democratic	December 3, 1866 – May 8, 1867	39th	Elected to finish Grider's term. Also elected to the next full term. Died.	1863–1873 [data missing]
Vacant		May 8, 1867 – December 5, 1867	40th		1863–1873 [data missing]
Jacob Golladay (Allensville)	Democratic	December 5, 1867 – February 28, 1870	40th 41st	Elected to finish Hise's term. Re-elected in 1868. Resigned.	1863–1873 [data missing]
Vacant		February 28, 1870 – May 10, 1870	41st		1863–1873 [data missing]
Joseph H. Lewis (Glasgow)	Democratic	May 10, 1870 – March 3, 1873	41st 42nd	Elected to finish Golladay's term Re-elected in 1870. Retired.	1863–1873 [data missing]
Charles W. Milliken (Franklin)	Democratic	March 4, 1873 – March 3, 1877	43rd 44th	Elected in 1872. Re-elected in 1874. Retired.	1873–1883 [data missing]
John W. Caldwell (Russellville)	Democratic	March 4, 1877 – March 3, 1883	45th 46th 47th	Elected in 1876. Re-elected in 1878. Re-elected in 1880. Retired.	1873–1883 [data missing]
John E. Halsell (Bowling Green)	Democratic	March 4, 1883 – March 3, 1887	48th 49th	Elected in 1882. Re-elected in 1884. Lost renomination.	1883–1893 [data missing]
W. Godfrey Hunter (Burkesville)	Republican	March 4, 1887 – March 3, 1889	50th	Elected in 1886. Lost re-election.	1883–1893 [data missing]
Isaac Goodnight (Franklin)	Democratic	March 4, 1889 – March 3, 1895	51st 52nd 53rd	Elected in 1888. Re-elected in 1890. Re-elected in 1892. Retired.	1883–1893 [data missing]
Isaac Goodnight (Franklin)	Democratic	March 4, 1889 – March 3, 1895	51st 52nd 53rd	Elected in 1888. Re-elected in 1890. Re-elected in 1892. Retired.	1893–1903 [data missing]
W. Godfrey Hunter (Burkesville)	Republican	March 4, 1895 – March 3, 1897	54th	Elected in 1894. Lost re-election.	1893–1903 [data missing]
John S. Rhea (Russellville)	Democratic	March 4, 1897 – March 25, 1902	55th 56th 57th	Elected in 1896. Re-elected in 1898. Re-elected in 1900. Lost contested election.	1893–1903 [data missing]
J. McKenzie Moss (Bowling Green)	Republican	March 25, 1902 – March 3, 1903	57th	Won contested election. Lost re-election.	1893–1903 [data missing]
John S. Rhea (Russellville)	Democratic	March 4, 1903 – March 3, 1905	58th	Elected in 1902. Retired.	1903–1913 [data missing]
James M. Richardson (Glasgow)	Democratic	March 4, 1905 – March 3, 1907	59th	Elected in 1904. Lost re-election.	1903–1913 [data missing]
Addison James (Penrod)	Republican	March 4, 1907 – March 3, 1909	60th	Elected in 1906. Lost re-election.	1903–1913 [data missing]
Robert Y. Thomas Jr. (Central City)	Democratic	March 4, 1909 – September 3, 1925	61st 62nd 63rd 64th 65th 66th 67th 68th 69th	Elected in 1908. Re-elected in 1910. Re-elected in 1912. Re-elected in 1914. Re-elected in 1916. Re-elected in 1918. Re-elected in 1920. Re-elected in 1922. Re-elected in 1924. Died.	1903–1913 [data missing]
Robert Y. Thomas Jr. (Central City)	Democratic	March 4, 1909 – September 3, 1925	61st 62nd 63rd 64th 65th 66th 67th 68th 69th	Elected in 1908. Re-elected in 1910. Re-elected in 1912. Re-elected in 1914. Re-elected in 1916. Re-elected in 1918. Re-elected in 1920. Re-elected in 1922. Re-elected in 1924. Died.	1913–1933
Vacant		September 3, 1925 – December 26, 1925	69th		1913–1933
John W. Moore (Morgantown)	Democratic	December 26, 1925 – March 3, 1929	69th 70th	Elected to finish Thomas's term. Re-elected in 1926. Lost re-election.	1913–1933
Charles W. Roark (Greenville)	Republican	March 4, 1929 – April 5, 1929	71st	Elected in 1928. Died.	1913–1933
Vacant		April 5, 1929 – June 1, 1929	71st		1913–1933
John W. Moore (Morgantown)	Democratic	June 1, 1929 – March 3, 1933	71st 72nd	Elected to finish Roark's term. Re-elected in 1930. Retired.	1913–1933
District inactive		March 4, 1933 – January 3, 1935	73rd	See Kentucky's at-large congressional district.	
Emmet O'Neal (Louisville)	Democratic	January 3, 1935 – January 3, 1947	74th 75th 76th 77th 78th 79th	Elected in 1934. Re-elected in 1936. Re-elected in 1938. Re-elected in 1940. Re-elected in 1942. Re-elected in 1944. Lost re-election.	1935–1953; Jefferson County.
Thruston B. Morton (Glenview)	Republican	January 3, 1947 – January 3, 1953	80th 81st 82nd	Elected in 1946. Re-elected in 1948. Re-elected in 1950. Retired.	1935–1953; Jefferson County.
John M. Robsion Jr. (Louisville)	Republican	January 3, 1953 – January 3, 1959	83rd 84th 85th	Elected in 1952. Re-elected in 1954. Re-elected in 1956. Lost re-election.	1953–1957; Jefferson County.
John M. Robsion Jr. (Louisville)	Republican	January 3, 1953 – January 3, 1959	83rd 84th 85th	Elected in 1952. Re-elected in 1954. Re-elected in 1956. Lost re-election.	1957–1963; Jefferson County.
Frank W. Burke (Louisville)	Democratic	January 3, 1959 – January 3, 1963	86th 87th	Elected in 1958. Re-elected in 1960. Lost re-election.	1957–1963; Jefferson County.
Gene Snyder (Jeffersontown)	Republican	January 3, 1963 – January 3, 1965	88th	Elected in 1962. Lost re-election.	1963–1967; Jefferson County.
Charles R. Farnsley (Louisville)	Democratic	January 3, 1965 – January 3, 1967	89th	Elected in 1964. Retired.	1963–1967; Jefferson County.
William O. Cowger (Louisville)	Republican	January 3, 1967 – January 3, 1971	90th 91st	Elected in 1966. Re-elected in 1968. Lost re-election.	1967–1973; Jefferson County (part).
Romano Mazzoli (Louisville)	Democratic	January 3, 1971 – January 3, 1995	92nd 93rd 94th 95th 96th 97th 98th 99th 100th 101st 102nd 103rd	Elected in 1970. Re-elected in 1972. Re-elected in 1974. Re-elected in 1976. Re-elected in 1978. Re-elected in 1980. Re-elected in 1982. Re-elected in 1984. Re-elected in 1986. Re-elected in 1988. Re-elected in 1990. Re-elected in 1992. Retired.	1967–1973; Jefferson County (part).
Romano Mazzoli (Louisville)	Democratic	January 3, 1971 – January 3, 1995	92nd 93rd 94th 95th 96th 97th 98th 99th 100th 101st 102nd 103rd	Elected in 1970. Re-elected in 1972. Re-elected in 1974. Re-elected in 1976. Re-elected in 1978. Re-elected in 1980. Re-elected in 1982. Re-elected in 1984. Re-elected in 1986. Re-elected in 1988. Re-elected in 1990. Re-elected in 1992. Retired.	1973–1983
Romano Mazzoli (Louisville)	Democratic	January 3, 1971 – January 3, 1995	92nd 93rd 94th 95th 96th 97th 98th 99th 100th 101st 102nd 103rd	Elected in 1970. Re-elected in 1972. Re-elected in 1974. Re-elected in 1976. Re-elected in 1978. Re-elected in 1980. Re-elected in 1982. Re-elected in 1984. Re-elected in 1986. Re-elected in 1988. Re-elected in 1990. Re-elected in 1992. Retired.	1983–1993
Romano Mazzoli (Louisville)	Democratic	January 3, 1971 – January 3, 1995	92nd 93rd 94th 95th 96th 97th 98th 99th 100th 101st 102nd 103rd	Elected in 1970. Re-elected in 1972. Re-elected in 1974. Re-elected in 1976. Re-elected in 1978. Re-elected in 1980. Re-elected in 1982. Re-elected in 1984. Re-elected in 1986. Re-elected in 1988. Re-elected in 1990. Re-elected in 1992. Retired.	1993–2003
Mike Ward (Louisville)	Democratic	January 3, 1995 – January 3, 1997	104th	Elected in 1994. Lost re-election.	1993–2003
Anne Northup (Louisville)	Republican	January 3, 1997 – January 3, 2007	105th 106th 107th 108th 109th	Elected in 1996. Re-elected in 1998. Re-elected in 2000. Re-elected in 2002. Re-elected in 2004. Lost re-election.	1993–2003
Anne Northup (Louisville)	Republican	January 3, 1997 – January 3, 2007	105th 106th 107th 108th 109th	Elected in 1996. Re-elected in 1998. Re-elected in 2000. Re-elected in 2002. Re-elected in 2004. Lost re-election.	2003–2013
John Yarmuth (Louisville)	Democratic	January 3, 2007 – January 3, 2023	110th 111th 112th 113th 114th 115th 116th 117th	Elected in 2006. Re-elected in 2008. Re-elected in 2010. Re-elected in 2012. Re-elected in 2014. Re-elected in 2016. Re-elected in 2018. Re-elected in 2020. Retired.	2003–2013
John Yarmuth (Louisville)	Democratic	January 3, 2007 – January 3, 2023	110th 111th 112th 113th 114th 115th 116th 117th	Elected in 2006. Re-elected in 2008. Re-elected in 2010. Re-elected in 2012. Re-elected in 2014. Re-elected in 2016. Re-elected in 2018. Re-elected in 2020. Retired.	2013–2023
Morgan McGarvey (Louisville)	Democratic	January 3, 2023 – present	118th 119th	Elected in 2022. Re-elected in 2024. Re-elected in 2026.	2023–present

== Election results ==
=== 1930s ===
==== 1932 ====
Kentucky's At-Large Congressional General Election (1932)
Party	Candidate	Votes	%
Democratic	Fred M. Vinson (incumbent)	575,191	
Democratic	John Y. Brown Sr.	574,270	
Democratic	Andrew J. May (incumbent)	574,189	
Democratic	Brent Spence (incumbent)	574,079	
Democratic	Virgil Chapman (incumbent)	573,750	
Democratic	Glover H. Cary (incumbent)	573,505	
Democratic	William Voris Gregory (incumbent)	573,269	
Democratic	Cap R. Carden (incumbent)	573,257	
Democratic	Finley Hamilton	573,024	
Republican	Hillard H. Smith	391,868	
Republican	Robert E. Lee Blackburn	391,674	
Republican	William Lewis	390,982	
Republican	George P. Ellison	390,739	
Republican	D.E. McClure	390,474	
Republican	J.C. Speight	390,370	
Republican	Hugh H. Asher	390,148	
Republican	B.T. Rountree	390,041	
Republican	Frank B. Russell	389,950	
Socialist	John T. Scopes	3,273	
Socialist	J.J. Thobe	3,264	
Socialist	C.E. Trimble	3,260	
Socialist	W.G. Haag	3,259	
Socialist	E. L. Nance	3,256	
Socialist	E.C. Schulz	3,256	
Socialist	J.M. Woodward	3,255	
Socialist	H.L. Harwood	3,254	
Socialist	D.S. Bennett	3,252	
Communist	Frank Reynolds	241	
Communist	George N. Conway	236	
Total votes			
Turnout			
Democratic hold			

==== 1934 ====
Kentucky's 3rd Congressional District General Election (1934)
Party	Candidate	Votes	%
Democratic	Emmet O'Neal	48,664	56.20
Republican	Frank M. Drake	36,922	42.64
Independent	Peter J. Gnau	414	0.48
Socialist	Clell G. Fowler	395	0.46
Socialist Labor	William H. Brann	165	0.19
Communist	J. Stuart McIntyre	38	0.04
Total votes		86,598	100.00
Turnout			
Democratic hold			

==== 1936 ====
Kentucky's 3rd Congressional District General Election (1936)
Party	Candidate	Votes	%
Democratic	Emmet O'Neal (incumbent)	85,034	60.30
Republican	W. A. Armstrong	52,600	37.30
Union	Jerry V. Spencer	3,206	2.27
Socialist	Sara Kasdan	170	0.12
Total votes		93,588	100.00
Turnout			
Democratic hold			

==== 1938 ====
Kentucky's 3rd Congressional District General Election (1938)
Party	Candidate	Votes	%
Democratic	Emmet O'Neal (incumbent)	57,227	61.15
Republican	Frank A. Ropke	36,361	38.85
Total votes		93,588	100.00
Turnout			
Democratic hold			

=== 1940s ===
==== 1940 ====
Kentucky's 3rd Congressional District General Election (1940)
Party	Candidate	Votes	%
Democratic	Emmet O'Neal (incumbent)	96,253	60.00
Republican	Ben. J. Brumleve	64,053	40.00
Total votes		160,306	100.00
Turnout			
Democratic hold			

==== 1942 ====
Kentucky's 3rd Congressional District General Election (1942)
Party	Candidate	Votes	%
Democratic	Emmet O'Neal (incumbent)	39,866	55.16
Republican	Joett Ross Todd	32,404	44.84
Total votes		72,270	100.00
Turnout			
Democratic hold			

==== 1944 ====
Kentucky's 3rd Congressional District General Election (1944)
Party	Candidate	Votes	%
Republican	Garland R. Hubbard	79,922	62.00
Prohibition	Bessie Graham	308	0.24
Democratic	Frank L. Chelf	48,671	37.76
Total votes		128,901	100.00
Turnout			
Republican gain from Democratic			

==== 1946 ====
Kentucky's 3rd Congressional District General Election (1946)
Party	Candidate	Votes	%
Republican	Thurston Ballard Morton	61,899	58.12
Democratic	Emmet O'Neil	44,599	41.88
Total votes		106,498	100.00
Turnout			
Republican hold			

==== 1948 ====
Kentucky's 3rd Congressional District General Election (1948)
Party	Candidate	Votes	%
Republican	Thruston Ballard Morton (incumbent)	74,168	52.96
Democratic	Ralph H. Logan	64,877	46.33
Progressive	Alfred M. Carroll	686	0.49
Prohibition	Robert Jack Garrison	315	0.22
Total votes		140,046	100.00
Turnout			
Republican hold			

=== 1950s ===
==== 1950 ====
Kentucky's 3rd Congressional District General Election (1950)
Party	Candidate	Votes	%
Republican	Thruston Ballard Morton (incumbent)	62,363	55.53
Democratic	Alex P. Humphrey	49,935	44.47
Total votes		112,298	100.00
Turnout			
Republican hold			

==== 1952 ====
Kentucky's 3rd Congressional District General Election (1952)
Party	Candidate	Votes	%
Republican	John M Robsion, Jr	95,041	54.01
Democratic	Boman L. Shamburger	80,347	45.66
Independent	H. A. I. Rosenberg	573	0.33
Total votes		175,961	100.00
Turnout			
Republican hold			

==== 1954 ====
Kentucky's 3rd Congressional District General Election (1954)
Party	Candidate	Votes	%
Republican	John M Robsion, Jr (incumbent)	72,073	50.20
Democratic	Harrison M Robertson	71,500	49.80
Total votes		143,573	100.00
Turnout			
Republican hold			

==== 1956 ====
Kentucky's 3rd Congressional District General Election (1956)
Party	Candidate	Votes	%
Democratic	Phillip Ardery	84,912	43.21
Republican	John M Robsion, Jr (incumbent)	111,598	56.79
Total votes		196,510	100.00
Turnout			
Republican hold			

==== 1958 ====
Kentucky's 3rd Congressional District General Election (1958)
Party	Candidate	Votes	%
Democratic	Frank W Burke	73,121	52.16
Republican	John M Robsion (incumbent)	67,059	47.84
Total votes		140,180	100.00
Turnout			
Democratic gain from Republican			

=== 1960s ===
==== 1960 ====
Kentucky's 3rd Congressional District General Election (1960)
Party	Candidate	Votes	%
Democratic	Frank W. Burke (incumbent)	115,421	50.25
Republican	Henry R. Heyburn	114,263	49.75
Total votes		229,684	100.00
Turnout			
Democratic hold			

==== 1962 ====
Kentucky's 3rd Congressional District General Election (1962)
Party	Candidate	Votes	%
Democratic	Frank W. Burke (incumbent)	91,544	49.18
Republican	M. G. "Gene" Snyder	94,579	50.82
Total votes		229,684	100.00
Turnout			
Republican gain from Democratic			

==== 1964 ====
Kentucky's 3rd Congressional District General Election (1964)
Party	Candidate	Votes	%
Democratic	Charles P. Farnsley	117,892	53.82
Republican	M.G. "Gene" Snyder (incumbent)	101,168	46.18
Total votes		219,060	100.00
Turnout			
Democratic gain from Republican			

==== 1966 ====
Kentucky's 3rd Congressional District General Election (1966)
Party	Candidate	Votes	%
Democratic	Norbert Blume	46,240	40.99
Republican	William O. Cowger	66,577	59.01
Total votes		112,817	100.00
Turnout			
Republican gain from Democratic			

==== 1968 ====
Kentucky's 3rd Congressional District General Election (1968)
Party	Candidate	Votes	%
Republican	William O. Cowger (incumbent)	70,318	55.95
Democratic	Tom Ray	55,366	44.05
Total votes		125,684	100.00
Turnout			
Republican hold			

=== 1970s ===
==== 1970 ====
Kentucky's 3rd Congressional District General Election (1970)
Party	Candidate	Votes	%
Republican	William O. Cowger (incumbent)	49,891	48.32
Democratic	Romano L. Mazzoli	50,102	48.52
American	Ronald W. Watson	3,265	3.16
Total votes		103,258	100.00
Turnout			
Democratic gain from Republican			

==== 1972 ====
Kentucky's 3rd Congressional District General Election (1972)
Party	Candidate	Votes	%
Democratic	Romano L. Mazzoli (incumbent)	86,810	62.15
Republican	Phil Kaelin, Jr	51,634	36.97
American	William P. Chambers	1,227	0.88
Total votes		139,671	100.00
Turnout			
Democratic hold			

==== 1974 ====
Kentucky's 3rd Congressional District General Election (1974)
Party	Candidate	Votes	%
Republican	Vincent N. Barclay	28,813	26.56
Democratic	Romano L. Mazzoli (incumbent)	37,346	69.67
American	William P. Chambers	3,383	3.12
Independent	Luther J. Wilson	708	0.65
Total votes		108,475	100.00
Turnout			
Democratic hold			

==== 1976 ====
Kentucky's 3rd Congressional District General Election (1976)
Party	Candidate	Votes	%
Republican	Denzil J. Ramsey	58,019	41.22
Democratic	Romano L. Mazzoli (incumbent)	80,496	57.19
American	William P. Chambers	2,229	1.58
Total votes		140,744	100.00
Turnout			
Democratic hold			

==== 1978 ====
Kentucky's 3rd Congressional District General Election (1978)
Party	Candidate	Votes	%
Democratic	Romano L. Mazzoli (incumbent)	37,346	65.67
Republican	Norbert D. Leveronne	17,785	31.27
Independent	Tom Beckham	1,312	2.31
Socialist Workers	John Cumbler	428	0.75
Total votes		56,871	100.00
Turnout			
Democratic hold			

=== 1980s ===
==== 1980 ====
Kentucky's 3rd Congressional District General Election (1980)
Party	Candidate	Votes	%
Democratic	Romano L. Mazzoli (incumbent)	85,873	63.74
Republican	Richard Cesler	46,681	34.65
American	Robert D. Vessels	468	0.35
Citizens	John Cumbler	1,272	0.94
Libertarian	Henry G. Logsdon	430	0.32
Total votes		134,724	100.00
Turnout			
Democratic hold			

==== 1982 ====
Kentucky's 3rd Congressional District General Election (1982)
Party	Candidate	Votes	%
Republican	Carl Brown	45,900	32.19
Democratic	Romano L. Mazzoli (incumbent)	92,849	65.11
Independent	Norbert D. Leveronne	2,840	1.99
Libertarian	Dan Murray	608	0.43
Socialist Workers	Craig Honts	400	0.28
Total votes		142,597	100.00
Turnout			
Democratic hold			

==== 1984 ====
Kentucky's 3rd Congressional District General Election (1984)
Party	Candidate	Votes	%
Republican	Suzanne M. Warner	68,185	31.67
Democratic	Romano L. Mazzoli (incumbent)	145,680	67.67
Independent	Peggy Kreiner	1,273	0.59
Write-In		139	0.06
Total votes		215,277	100.00
Turnout			
Democratic hold			

==== 1986 ====
Kentucky's 3rd Congressional District General Election (1986)
Party	Candidate	Votes	%
Republican	Lee Holmes	29,348	26.15
Democratic	Romano L. Mazzoli (incumbent)	81,943	73.01
Socialist Workers	Estelle Debates	899	0.80
Write-In		43	0.04
Total votes		112,233	100.00
Turnout			
Democratic hold			

==== 1988 ====
Kentucky's 3rd Congressional District General Election (1988)
Party	Candidate	Votes	%
Republican	Philip Dunnagan	57,387	30.30
Democratic	Romano L. Mazzoli (incumbent)	131,981	69.70
Total votes		189,368	100.00
Turnout			
Democratic hold			

=== 1990s ===
==== 1990 ====
Kentucky's 3rd Congressional District General Election (1990)
Party	Candidate	Votes	%
Republican	Al Brown	55,188	39.44
Democratic	Romano L. Mazzoli	84,750	60.56
Total votes		139,938	100.00
Turnout			
Democratic hold			

==== 1992 ====
Kentucky's 3rd Congressional District General Election (1992)
Party	Candidate	Votes	%
Democratic	Romano L. Mazzoli (incumbent)	148,066	52.74
Republican	Susan B. Stokes	132,689	47.26
Write-In	Patricia Metten	15	0.005
Total votes		280,770	100.00
Turnout			
Democratic hold			

==== 1994 ====
Kentucky's 3rd Congressional District General Election (1994)
Party	Candidate	Votes	%
Democratic	Mike Ward	67,663	44.36
Republican	Susan B. Stokes	67,238	44.08
U.S. Taxpayers' Party (United States)	Richard Lewis	17,591	11.53
Write-In	Valerie Cohen	31	0.02
Total votes		152,523	100.00
Turnout			
Democratic hold			

==== 1996 ====
Kentucky's 3rd Congressional District General Election (1996)
Party	Candidate	Votes	%
Republican	Anne Northup	126,625	50.26
Democratic	Mike Ward (Incumbent)	125,326	49.74
Total votes		251,951	100.00
Turnout			
Republican gain from Democratic			

==== 1998 ====
Kentucky's 3rd Congressional District General Election (1998)
Party	Candidate	Votes	%
Republican	Anne Northup (Incumbent)	100,690	52.02
Democratic	Chris Gorman	92,865	47.98
Total votes		193,555	100.00
Turnout			
Republican hold			

=== 2000s ===
==== 2000 ====
Kentucky's 3rd Congressional District General Election (2000)
Party	Candidate	Votes	%
Republican	Anne Northup (Incumbent)	142,106	52.87
Democratic	Eleanor Jordon	118,875	44.23
Libertarian	Donna Walker Mancini	7,804	2.90
Total votes		268,785	100.00
Turnout			67.9
Republican hold			

==== 2002 ====
Kentucky's 3rd Congressional District General Election (2002)
Party	Candidate	Votes	%
Republican	Anne Northup (Incumbent)	118,228	51.61
Democratic	Jack Conway	110,846	48.39
Total votes		229,074	100.00
Turnout			
Republican hold			

==== 2004 ====
Kentucky's 3rd Congressional District General Election (2004)
Party	Candidate	Votes	%
Republican	Anne Northup (Incumbent)	197,736	60.26
Democratic	Tony Miller	124,040	37.80
Libertarian	George C. Dick	6,363	1.94
Total votes		328,139	100.00
Turnout			
Republican hold			

==== 2006 ====
Kentucky's 3rd Congressional District General Election (2006)
Party	Candidate	Votes	%
Democratic	John Yarmuth	122,471	50.62
Republican	Anne Northup (Incumbent)	116,555	48.18
Libertarian	Donna Walker Mancini	2,134	0.88
Constitution	W. Ed Parker	774	0.32
Total votes		241,934	100.00
Turnout			
Democratic gain from Republican			

==== 2008 ====
Kentucky's 3rd Congressional District General Election (2008)
Party	Candidate	Votes	%
Democratic	John Yarmuth (Incumbent)	203,843	59.37
Republican	Anne Northup	139,527	40.64
Libertarian	Ed Martin	Republican sued; votes not counted	0.00
Total votes		343,370	100.00
Turnout			
Democratic hold			

=== 2010s ===
==== 2010 ====
Kentucky's 3rd Congressional District General Election (2010)
Party	Candidate	Votes	%
Democratic	John Yarmuth (Incumbent)	139,940	54.68
Republican	Todd Lally	112,627	44.01
Libertarian	Ed Martin	2,029	0.79
Independent	Michael Hansen	1,334	0.52
Total votes		255,930	100.00
Turnout			
Democratic hold			

==== 2012 ====
Kentucky's 3rd Congressional District General Election (2012)
Party	Candidate	Votes	%
Democratic	John Yarmuth (Incumbent)	206,385	63.96
Republican	Brooks Wicker	111,452	34.54
Independent	Robert L. DeVore, Jr.	4.819	1.49
Total votes		322,656	100.0
Turnout			
Democratic hold			

==== 2014 ====
Kentucky's 3rd Congressional District General Election (2014)
Party	Candidate	Votes	%
Democratic	John Yarmuth (Incumbent)	157,056	63.5
Republican	Michael MacFarlane	87,981	35.6
Independent	Gregory Peter Puccetti	2,318	0.9
Total votes		247,355	100
Democratic hold			

==== 2016 ====
Kentucky's 3rd Congressional District General Election (2016)
Party	Candidate	Votes	%
Democratic	John Yarmuth (Incumbent)	212,401	63.5
Republican	Harold Bratcher	122,093	36.5
Total votes		334,494	100.00
Democratic hold			

==== 2018 ====
Kentucky's 3rd Congressional District General Election (2018)
Party	Candidate	Votes	%
Democratic	John Yarmuth (Incumbent)	173,002	62.1
Republican	Vickie Yates Glisson	101,930	36.6
Libertarian	Gregory Boles	3,788	1.4
Total votes		278,720	100.00
Democratic hold			

=== 2020s ===
==== 2020 ====
Kentucky's 3rd Congressional District General Election (2020)
Party	Candidate	Votes	%
Democratic	John Yarmuth (Incumbent)	230,672	62.7
Republican	Rhonda Palazzo	137,425	37.3
Total votes		368,097	100.00
Democratic hold			

==== 2022 ====
Kentucky's 3rd Congressional District General Election (2022)
Party	Candidate	Votes	%
Democratic	Morgan McGarvey	160,920	62.0
Republican	Stuart Ray	98,637	38.0
	Daniel Cobble (write-in)	30	0.0
Total votes		259,587	100.0
Democratic hold			

==== 2024 ====
Kentucky's 3rd Congressional District General Election (2024)
Party	Candidate	Votes	%
Democratic	Morgan McGarvey (incumbent)	203,100	62.0
Republican	Mike Craven	124,713	38.0
	Write-in	51	0.0
Total votes		327,864	100.0
Democratic hold			

== See also ==
- Kentucky's congressional districts
- List of United States congressional districts
