= Westwood, Kentucky =

Westwood is the name of two locations in the U.S. state of Kentucky:

- Westwood, Boyd County, Kentucky, a census-designated place
- Westwood, Jefferson County, Kentucky, a city located within the Louisville Metro area
