= James M. Richardson (politician) =

American politician

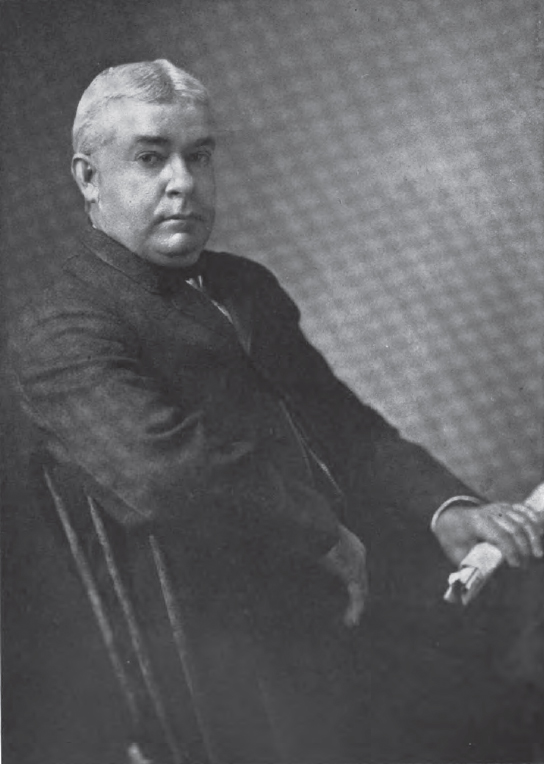

Member of the U.S. House of Representatives from Kentucky's 3rd district
- In office March 4, 1905 – March 3, 1907
- Preceded by: John Stockdale Rhea
- Succeeded by: Addison James

Member of the Kentucky House of Representatives from the 34th district
- In office January 1, 1896 – January 1, 1898
- Preceded by: Joseph P. Nuckols
- Succeeded by: J. B. Depp

Personal details
- Born: July 1, 1858 Mobile, Alabama
- Died: February 9, 1925 (aged 66) Glasgow, Kentucky
- Resting place: Glasgow Cemetery
- Party: Democratic
- Profession: Newspaper editor

James Montgomery Richardson (July 1, 1858 – February 9, 1925) was a U.S. representative from Kentucky.

Born in Mobile, Alabama, Richardson moved to Glasgow, Kentucky, in early youth and resided with his uncle. He attended the common schools. He became editor of the Glasgow (Kentucky) Times in 1878. He served as delegate to the Democratic National Convention in 1896. He served as member of the State house of representatives in 1896. He served as prison commissioner from 1900 to 1905, when he resigned, having been elected to Congress.

Richardson was elected as a Democrat to the Fifty-ninth Congress (March 4, 1905 – March 3, 1907). He was an unsuccessful candidate for reelection. He resumed newspaper activities. Postmaster at Glasgow from May 22, 1913, to May 9, 1922. He died in Glasgow, Kentucky, February 9, 1925. He was interred in Glasgow Cemetery.

U.S. House of Representatives
Preceded by John S. Rhea	United States Representative, Kentucky's 3rd district March 4, 1905 – March 3, 1907	Succeeded by Addison James
