= Langdon Place, Kentucky =

- City
- Location of Langdon Place in Jefferson County, Kentucky

- Location within the state of Kentucky Langdon Place (the United States)
- Coordinates: 38°17′12″N 85°35′06″W
- Country: United States
- State: Kentucky
- County: Jefferson
- Incorporated: 1977

Area
  - Total: 0.17 sq mi (0.44 km^{2})
  - Land: 0.17 sq mi (0.44 km^{2})
  - Water: 0 sq mi (0.00 km^{2})
- Elevation: 650 ft (200 m)

Population (2020)
  - Total: 870
  - Density: 5,098.7/sq mi (1,968.61/km^{2})
- Time zone: UTC-5 (Eastern (EST))
  - Summer (DST): UTC-4 (EDT)
- ZIP Code: 40242
- FIPS code: 21-43900
- GNIS feature ID: 2404884
- Website: www.langdonplace.com

Langdon Place is a home rule-class city in Jefferson County, Kentucky, United States. As of the 2020 census, Langdon Place had a population of 870.

== Geography ==
Langdon Place is located in northeastern Jefferson County. It is bordered to the north by Murray Hill, at its eastern corner by Meadow Vale, to the southeast by Rolling Hills, to the south by Westwood, to the southwest by Plantation, and otherwise by consolidated Louisville/Jefferson County.

Westport Road forms the southern boundary of the city, and Goose Creek Road forms the northeast boundary. Downtown Louisville is 11 miles (18 km) to the west.

According to the United States Census Bureau, the city has a total area of 0.19 square miles (0.48 km^{2}), of which 0.05 acres (195 m^{2}), or 0.04%, are water.

== Demographics ==
Historical population
Census	Pop.	Note	%±
1980	407		—
1990	874		114.7%
2000	974		11.4%
2010	936		−3.9%
2020	870		−7.1%
U.S. Decennial Census

As of the census of 2000, there were 974 people, 350 households, and 277 families residing in the city. The population density was 5,568.3 inhabitants per square mile (2,149.9/km^{2}). There were 358 housing units at an average density of 2,046.7 per square mile (790.2/km^{2}). The racial makeup of the city was 84.70% White, 8.21% African American, 0.31% Native American, 4.62% Asian, and 2.16% from two or more races. Hispanic or Latino of any race were 1.13% of the population.

There were 350 households, out of which 42.9% had children under the age of 18 living with them, 68.6% were married couples living together, 7.1% had a female householder with no husband present, and 20.6% were non-families. 16.9% of all households were made up of individuals, and 2.3% had someone living alone who was 65 years of age or older. The average household size was 2.78 and the average family size was 3.17.

In the city, the population was spread out, with 28.1% under the age of 18, 7.7% from 18 to 24, 27.1% from 25 to 44, 30.3% from 45 to 64, and 6.8% who were 65 years of age or older. The median age was 38 years. For every 100 females, there were 94.4 males. For every 100 females age 18 and over, there were 99.4 males.

The median income for a household in the city was $67,167, and the median income for a family was $72,813. Males had a median income of $54,861 versus $32,434 for females. The per capita income for the city was $29,231. None of the families and 0.8% of the population were living below the poverty line, including no under eighteens and 3.3% of those over 64.
