= Addison James =

American politician (1849–1910)

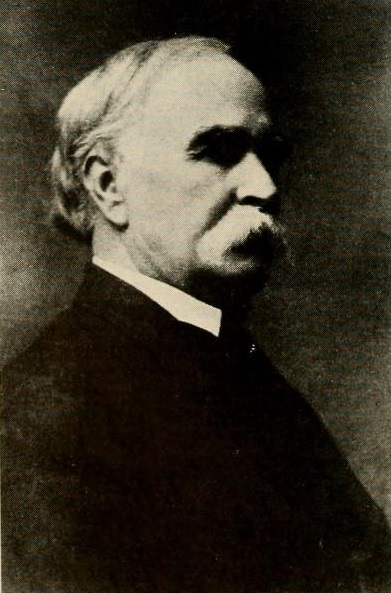

Member of the U.S. House of Representatives from Kentucky's 3rd district
- In office March 4, 1907 – March 3, 1909
- Preceded by: James M. Richardson
- Succeeded by: Robert Y. Thomas Jr.

Member of the Kentucky Senate from the 7th district
- In office April 21, 1896 (Note: Date of election, not necessarily when oath was administered.) – July 6, 1897
- Preceded by: Himself
- Succeeded by: T. G. Turner
- In office January 1, 1896 – March 11, 1896
- Preceded by: C. Slade Taylor
- Succeeded by: Himself

Member of the Kentucky House of Representatives from Muhlenberg County
- In office August 3, 1891 – January 21, 1893
- Preceded by: Charles B. Wickliffe
- Succeeded by: W. J. Cox

Personal details
- Born: February 27, 1849
- Died: June 7, 1910 (aged 61)
- Party: Republican

Addison Davis James (February 27, 1849 – June 7, 1910) was a United States representative from Kentucky. He was born near Morgantown, Kentucky. He attended the public schools and began the study of medicine in 1870. He graduated from the University of Louisville, Louisville, Kentucky, in 1873.

Addison was a member of the Kentucky constitutional convention in 1890 and a member of the Kentucky House of Representatives 1891–1893. He also served as a commissioner to the World's Fair at Chicago representing the State of Kentucky in 1892 and 1893. In addition, he was a member of the Kentucky Senate in 1895 and appointed United States marshal for the district of Kentucky on July 6, 1897, and reappointed on December 17, 1901, and served until December 31, 1905.

Addison was elected as a Republican to the Sixtieth Congress (March 4, 1907 – March 3, 1909) but was an unsuccessful candidate for reelection. After leaving Congress, he resumed the practice of medicine. He died in Penrod, Kentucky, in 1910 and was buried in a cemetery on the family estate.

== Notes ==
U.S. House of Representatives
Preceded by James M. Richardson	United States Representative, Kentucky 3rd District; March 4, 1907 – March 3, 1909	Succeeded by Robert Y. Thomas, Jr.
