= Robert Y. Thomas Jr. =

American politician

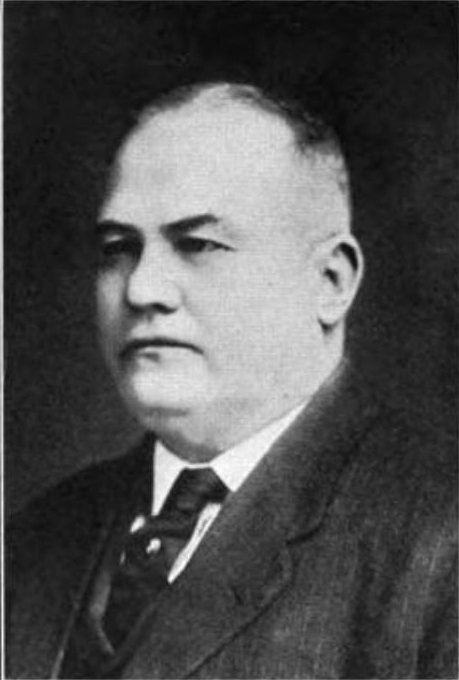

Member of the U.S. House of Representatives from Kentucky's 3rd district
- In office March 4, 1909 – September 3, 1925
- Preceded by: Addison James
- Succeeded by: John William Moore

Member of the Kentucky House of Representatives
- In office 1886–1887

Personal details
- Born: July 13, 1855 Logan County, Kentucky
- Died: September 3, 1925 (aged 70) Red Boiling Springs, Tennessee
- Resting place: Evergreen Cemetery
- Party: Democratic
- Education: Bethel College
- Profession: Lawyer

Robert Young Thomas Jr. (July 13, 1855 – September 3, 1925) was a U.S. representative from Kentucky.

Born near Russellville, Kentucky, Thomas attended the common schools, and was graduated from Bethel College, Russellville, Kentucky, in 1878. He studied law. He was admitted to the bar in 1881 and commenced practice in Central City, Kentucky. He also engaged in journalism. He served as member of the State house of representatives in 1886 and 1887.

Thomas was elected Commonwealth attorney for the seventh judicial district of Kentucky in 1903 for a term of six years.

Thomas was elected as a Democrat to the Sixty-first and to the eight succeeding Congresses and served from March 4, 1909, until his death at Red Boiling Springs, Tennessee, September 3, 1925. During his time in Congress he introduced a bill in 1915 and 1920 to allow Civil War veterans of Kentucky that served over 90 days in the Kentucky State Militia to receive pensions. This bill was denied. He was interred in Evergreen Cemetery, Greenville, Kentucky.

== See also ==
- List of members of the United States Congress who died in office (1900–1949)

U.S. House of Representatives
Preceded by Addison James	United States Representative, Kentucky's 3rd district March 4, 1909 – September 3, 1925	Succeeded by John W. Moore
