= Maryhill Estates, Kentucky =

- City
- Location of Maryhill Estates in Jefferson County, Kentucky

- Location within the state of Kentucky Maryhill Estates (the United States)
- Coordinates: 38°15′59″N 85°39′12″W
- Country: United States
- State: Kentucky
- County: Jefferson
- Incorporated: 1963
- Named for: the Virgin Mary

Area
  - Total: 0.039 sq mi (0.10 km^{2})
  - Land: 0.039 sq mi (0.10 km^{2})
  - Water: 0 sq mi (0.00 km^{2})
- Elevation: 574 ft (175 m)

Population (2020)
  - Total: 185
  - Density: 4,676.6/sq mi (1,805.65/km^{2})
- Time zone: UTC-5 (Eastern (EST))
  - Summer (DST): UTC-4 (EDT)
- ZIP Code: 40207
- FIPS code: 21-50412
- GNIS feature ID: 2405035

Maryhill Estates is a home rule-class city in Jefferson County, Kentucky, United States. As of the 2020 census, Maryhill Estates had a population of 185.

Maryhill Estates incorporated in 1963 and was developed in the early 1960s. Developer John A. Walser purchased the land from the Archdiocese of Louisville after World War II and named the development after the Virgin Mary.

It is one of numerous small cities in Jefferson County which have resisted annexation or merger. Merger with nearby St. Matthews or Windy Hills has been discussed but not pursued.

== Geography ==
Maryhill Estates is located in northeastern Jefferson County. It is bordered to the north by Windy Hills, to the south by St. Matthews, and otherwise by consolidated Louisville/Jefferson County. The city consists solely of houses along six streets: Maryhill Lane, Crestview Road, Yancy Lane, Ormond Road, Maryknoll Lane, and Fatima Lane. Downtown Louisville is 7 miles (11 km) to the west.

According to the United States Census Bureau, Maryhill Estates has a total area of 0.04 square miles (0.10 km^{2}), all land.

== Demographics ==
Historical population
Census	Pop.	Note	%±
1970	211		—
1980	225		6.6%
1990	177		−21.3%
2000	175		−1.1%
2010	179		2.3%
2020	185		3.4%
U.S. Decennial Census

As of the census of 2000, there were 175 people, 62 households, and 54 families residing in the city. The population density was 3,679.8 inhabitants per square mile (1,420.8/km^{2}). There were 63 housing units at an average density of 1,324.7 per square mile (511.5/km^{2}). The racial makeup of the city was 97.71% White, 1.14% Asian and 1.14% Pacific Islander.

There were 62 households, out of which 38.7% had children under the age of 18 living with them, 87.1% were married couples living together, 1.6% had a female householder with no husband present, and 11.3% were non-families. 11.3% of all households were made up of individuals, and 6.5% had someone living alone who was 65 years of age or older. The average household size was 2.82 and the average family size was 3.04.

In the city, the population was spread out, with 29.1% under the age of 18, 3.4% from 18 to 24, 20.6% from 25 to 44, 23.4% from 45 to 64, and 23.4% who were 65 years of age or older. The median age was 43 years. For every 100 females, there were 103.5 males. For every 100 females age 18 and over, there were 93.8 males.

The median income for a household in the city was $101,753, and the median income for a family was $104,104. Males had a median income of $71,875 versus $35,417 for females. The per capita income for the city was $30,953. None of the families and 2.2% of the population were living below the poverty line, including no under eighteens and 6.1% of those over 64.
