= Beechwood Village, Kentucky =

- City
- Location of Beechwood Village in Jefferson County, Kentucky

- Location within the state of Kentucky Beechwood Village (the United States)
- Coordinates: 38°15′20″N 85°37′47″W
- Country: United States
- State: Kentucky
- County: Jefferson

Area
  - Total: 0.28 sq mi (0.72 km^{2})
  - Land: 0.28 sq mi (0.72 km^{2})
  - Water: 0 sq mi (0.00 km^{2})
- Elevation: 532 ft (162 m)

Population (2020)
  - Total: 1,280
  - Density: 4,600.8/sq mi (1,776.38/km^{2})
- Time zone: UTC-5 (Eastern (EST))
  - Summer (DST): UTC-4 (EDT)
- FIPS code: 21-05068
- GNIS feature ID: 2403836
- Website: www.beechwoodvillage.org

Beechwood Village is a home rule-class city in Jefferson County, Kentucky, United States. The city was formally incorporated by the state assembly in 1950. The population was 1,280 as of the 2020 census, down from 1,324 at the 2010 census

== Geography ==
Beechwood Village is located in northern Jefferson County 7 miles (11 km) east of downtown Louisville. It is bordered to the north by Woodlawn Park and on all other sides by St. Matthews.

The southern boundary of Beechwood Village is U.S. Route 60, and Interstate 264 touches the northeast end of the city.

According to the United States Census Bureau, the city has a total area of 0.28 square miles (0.72 km^{2}), all land.

== Demographics ==
Historical population
Census	Pop.	Note	%±
1960	1,903		—
1970	1,788		−6.0%
1980	1,462		−18.2%
1990	1,263		−13.6%
2000	1,173		−7.1%
2010	1,324		12.9%
2020	1,280		−3.3%
U.S. Decennial Census

At the 2000 census, there were 1,173 people, 532 households and 336 families residing in the city. The population density was 4,285.3 inhabitants per square mile (1,654.6/km^{2}). There were 542 housing units at an average density of 1,980.1 per square mile (764.5/km^{2}). The racial makeup of the city was 97.78% White, 0.43% Black or African American, 0.60% Asian, 0.17% from other races, and 1.02% from two or more races. Hispanic or Latino of any race were 0.68% of the population.

There were 532 households, of which 25.0% had children under the age of 18 living with them, 55.1% were married couples living together, 6.4% had a female householder with no husband present, and 36.8% were non-families. 32.3% of all households were made up of individuals, and 16.9% had someone living alone who was 65 years of age or older. The average household size was 2.20 and the average family size was 2.81.

19.4% of the population were under the age of 18, 4.7% from 18 to 24, 31.6% from 25 to 44, 23.0% from 45 to 64, and 21.3% who were 65 years of age or older. The median age was 41 years. For every 100 females, there were 85.6 males. For every 100 females age 18 and over, there were 79.8 males.

The median household income was $52,500 and the median family income was $66,250. Males had a median income of $46,705 compared with $34,000 for females. The per capita income for the city was $28,908. About 0.9% of families and 1.2% of the population were below the poverty line, including none of those under age 18 and 0.9% of those age 65 or over.
