= Woodlawn Park, Kentucky =

- City
- Flag Logo

- Location of Woodlawn Park in Jefferson County, Kentucky

- Location within the state of Kentucky Woodlawn Park (the United States)
- Coordinates: 38°15′41″N 85°37′51″W
- Country: United States
- State: Kentucky
- County: Jefferson

Area
  - Total: 0.24 sq mi (0.63 km^{2})
  - Land: 0.24 sq mi (0.63 km^{2})
  - Water: 0 sq mi (0.00 km^{2})
- Elevation: 541 ft (165 m)

Population (2020)
  - Total: 947
  - Density: 3,909.2/sq mi (1,509.34/km^{2})
- Time zone: UTC-5 (Eastern (EST))
  - Summer (DST): UTC-4 (EDT)
- ZIP Code: 40207
- FIPS code: 21-84576
- GNIS feature ID: 2405786
- Website: www.woodlawnpark.com

Woodlawn Park is a home rule-class city in Jefferson County, Kentucky, United States. As of the 2020 census, Woodlawn Park had a population of 947.

== History ==
Woodlawn Park lies on the site of the former Woodlawn Race Course, which opened in 1859 and drew national attention. The course closed after the Civil War. R. A. Alexander, noted breeder, was a major figure in buying estate for the National Racing Association. He contracted with Tiffany's to design the Woodlawn Vase, used in 1861 and 1862. It was buried for safety during the war. The vase is now the winner's trophy at the Preakness Stakes, where a replica is given each year.

Woodlawn Park was incorporated March 10, 1955.

== Geography ==
Woodlawn Park is located in northeastern Jefferson County. It is bordered to the north by Windy Hills, to the west by St. Matthews, to the south by Beechwood Village, and to the east by consolidated Louisville/Jefferson County.

Interstate 264 runs just east of the community.

According to the United States Census Bureau, Woodlawn Park has a total area of 0.24 square miles (0.63 km^{2}), all land.

== Demographics ==
Historical population
Census	Pop.	Note	%±
1960	1,137		—
1970	1,237		8.8%
1980	1,052		−15.0%
1990	1,099		4.5%
2000	1,033		−6.0%
2010	942		−8.8%
2020	947		0.5%
U.S. Decennial Census

As of the census of 2000, there were 1,033 people, 428 households, and 312 families residing in the city. The population density was 4,190.7 inhabitants per square mile (1,618.0/km^{2}). There were 435 housing units at an average density of 1,764.7 per square mile (681.4/km^{2}). The racial makeup of the city was 97.58% White, 0.97% African American, 0.77% Asian, and 0.68% from two or more races. Hispanic or Latino of any race were 0.68% of the population.

There were 428 households, out of which 29.7% had children under the age of 18 living with them, 60.7% were married couples living together, 10.3% had a female householder with no husband present, and 27.1% were non-families. 25.0% of all households were made up of individuals, and 11.0% had someone living alone who was 65 years of age or older. The average household size was 2.41 and the average family size was 2.89.

In the city, the population was spread out, with 22.0% under the age of 18, 4.3% from 18 to 24, 31.6% from 25 to 44, 24.1% from 45 to 64, and 18.1% who were 65 years of age or older. The median age was 40 years. For every 100 females, there were 94.2 males. For every 100 females age 18 and over, there were 88.8 males.

The median income for a household in the city was $55,000, and the median income for a family was $61,016. Males had a median income of $45,357 versus $33,365 for females. The per capita income for the city was $27,446. About 1.3% of families and 1.6% of the population were below the poverty line, including none of those under age 18 and 1.1% of those age 65 or over.
