= Worthington Hills, Kentucky =

City of Worthington Hills, Kentucky
- City
- Location of City of Worthington Hills in Jefferson County, Kentucky

- Location within the state of Kentucky City of Worthington Hills (the United States)
- Coordinates: 38°18′34″N 85°31′37″W
- Country: United States
- State: Kentucky
- County: Jefferson
- Incorporated: 1980

Area
  - Total: 0.25 sq mi (0.66 km^{2})
  - Land: 0.25 sq mi (0.66 km^{2})
  - Water: 0 sq mi (0.00 km^{2})
- Elevation: 735 ft (224 m)

Population (2020)
  - Total: 1,563
  - Density: 6,101.5/sq mi (2,355.82/km^{2})
- Time zone: UTC-5 (Eastern (EST))
  - Summer (DST): UTC-4 (EDT)
- ZIP Code: 40245
- FIPS code: 21-84891
- GNIS feature ID: 2405791
- Website: www.cityofworthingtonhillsky.gov

City of Worthington Hills is a home rule-class city in Jefferson County, Kentucky, United States. As of the 2020 census, the city had a population of 1,563.

A suburb of Louisville, City of Worthington Hills was separately incorporated by the state legislature on January 31, 1980.

== Geography ==
City of Worthington Hills is located in northeastern Jefferson County. It is bordered to the north and east by Coldstream and otherwise by consolidated Louisville/Jefferson County. Downtown Louisville is 15 miles (24 km) to the southwest.

According to the United States Census Bureau, the city has a total area of 0.25 square miles (0.64 km^{2}), all land.

== Demographics ==
Historical population
Census	Pop.	Note	%±
1990	973		—
2000	1,594		63.8%
2010	1,446		−9.3%
2020	1,563		8.1%
U.S. Decennial Census

=== 2020 census ===
As of the 2020 census, Worthington Hills had a population of 1,563. The median age was 36.6 years. 22.6% of residents were under the age of 18 and 12.0% of residents were 65 years of age or older. For every 100 females there were 88.1 males, and for every 100 females age 18 and over there were 86.6 males age 18 and over.

100.0% of residents lived in urban areas, while 0.0% lived in rural areas.

There were 633 households in Worthington Hills, of which 35.2% had children under the age of 18 living in them. Of all households, 46.0% were married-couple households, 15.8% were households with a male householder and no spouse or partner present, and 31.0% were households with a female householder and no spouse or partner present. About 25.2% of all households were made up of individuals and 7.3% had someone living alone who was 65 years of age or older.

There were 651 housing units, of which 2.8% were vacant. The homeowner vacancy rate was 1.2% and the rental vacancy rate was 7.0%.

Racial composition as of the 2020 census
Race	Number	Percent
White	875	56.0%
Black or African American	415	26.6%
American Indian and Alaska Native	2	0.1%
Asian	65	4.2%
Native Hawaiian and Other Pacific Islander	0	0.0%
Some other race	67	4.3%
Two or more races	139	8.9%
Hispanic or Latino (of any race)	130	8.3%

=== 2000 census ===
As of the census of 2000, there were 1,594 people, 577 households, and 447 families residing in the city. The population density was 5,699.9 inhabitants per square mile (2,200.7/km^{2}). There were 589 housing units at an average density of 2,106.2 per square mile (813.2/km^{2}). The racial makeup of the city was 63.68% White, 30.74% African American, 0.06% Native American, 1.69% Asian, 1.88% from other races, and 1.94% from two or more races. Hispanic or Latino of any race were 4.33% of the population.

There were 577 households, out of which 44.2% had children under the age of 18 living with them, 60.0% were married couples living together, 13.9% had a female householder with no husband present, and 22.5% were non-families. 17.7% of all households were made up of individuals, and 0.7% had someone living alone who was 65 years of age or older. The average household size was 2.76 and the average family size was 3.12.

In the city, the population was spread out, with 28.3% under the age of 18, 8.7% from 18 to 24, 40.3% from 25 to 44, 20.5% from 45 to 64, and 2.2% who were 65 years of age or older. The median age was 31 years. For every 100 females, there were 93.2 males. For every 100 females age 18 and over, there were 92.1 males.

The median income for a household in the city was $56,250, and the median income for a family was $58,500. Males had a median income of $40,278 versus $27,162 for females. The per capita income for the city was $22,199. About 3.5% of families and 2.9% of the population were below the poverty line, including 1.8% of those under age 18 and 7.5% of those age 65 or over.
