= Creekside, Kentucky =

- City
- Location of Creekside in Jefferson County, Kentucky

- Location within the state of Kentucky Creekside (the United States)
- Coordinates: 38°17′29″N 85°34′12″W
- Country: United States
- State: Kentucky
- County: Jefferson

Area
  - Total: 0.077 sq mi (0.20 km^{2})
  - Land: 0.077 sq mi (0.20 km^{2})
  - Water: 0 sq mi (0.00 km^{2})
- Elevation: 663 ft (202 m)

Population (2020)
  - Total: 305
  - Density: 4,020.2/sq mi (1,552.19/km^{2})
- Time zone: UTC-5 (Eastern (EST))
  - Summer (DST): UTC-4 (EDT)
- ZIP Code: 40241
- FIPS code: 21-18270
- GNIS feature ID: 2404148
- Website: www.creeksidecity.com

Creekside is a home rule-class city in Jefferson County, Kentucky, United States. As of the 2020 census, Creekside had a population of 305.

== Geography ==
Creekside is located in northeastern Jefferson County. It is bordered to the south by Hickory Hill and on all other sides by the Louisville/Jefferson County Metro Government. It is 12 miles (19 km) northeast of downtown Louisville.

According to the United States Census Bureau, the city has a total area of 0.1 square miles (0.2 km^{2}), all land.

== Demographics ==
Historical population
Census	Pop.	Note	%±
1980	419		—
1990	323		−22.9%
2000	336		4.0%
2010	305		−9.2%
2020	305		0.0%
U.S. Decennial Census

As of the census of 2000, there were 336 people, 124 households, and 106 families residing in the city. The population density was 3,799.9 inhabitants per square mile (1,467.1/km^{2}). There were 126 housing units at an average density of 1,425.0 per square mile (550.2/km^{2}). The racial makeup of the city was 94.35% White, 3.57% Black or African American, 0.89% from other races, and 1.19% from two or more races. Hispanic or Latino of any race were 0.60% of the population.

There were 124 households, out of which 36.3% had children under the age of 18 living with them, 78.2% were married couples living together, 4.0% had a female householder with no husband present, and 14.5% were non-families. 13.7% of all households were made up of individuals, and 4.8% had someone living alone who was 65 years of age or older. The average household size was 2.71 and the average family size was 2.97.

In the city, the population was spread out, with 24.7% under the age of 18, 3.6% from 18 to 24, 28.3% from 25 to 44, 32.1% from 45 to 64, and 11.3% who were 65 years of age or older. The median age was 42 years. For every 100 females, there were 93.1 males. For every 100 females age 18 and over, there were 94.6 males.

The median income for a household in the city was $77,385, and the median income for a family was $85,000. Males had a median income of $60,750 versus $29,375 for females. The per capita income for the city was $31,457. About 1.0% of families and 3.4% of the population were below the poverty line, including 5.1% of those under age 18 and none of those age 65 or over.
