= Houston Acres, Kentucky =

- City
- Location of Houston Acres in Jefferson County, Kentucky

- Location within the state of Kentucky Houston Acres (the United States)
- Coordinates: 38°12′53″N 85°36′51″W
- Country: United States
- State: Kentucky
- County: Jefferson
- Incorporated: 1956

Area
  - Total: 0.14 sq mi (0.37 km^{2})
  - Land: 0.14 sq mi (0.37 km^{2})
  - Water: 0 sq mi (0.00 km^{2})
- Elevation: 577 ft (176 m)

Population (2020)
  - Total: 492
  - Density: 3,414.8/sq mi (1,318.47/km^{2})
- Time zone: UTC-5 (Eastern (EST))
  - Summer (DST): UTC-4 (EDT)
- ZIP Code: 40220
- FIPS code: 21-38170
- GNIS feature ID: 2404736
- Website: www.neighborhoodlink.com/Houston_Acres

Houston Acres is a home rule-class city in Jefferson County, Kentucky, United States. As of the 2020 census, Houston Acres had a population of 492.

== Geography ==
Houston Acres is located in east-central Jefferson County. It is bordered to the west by Louisville, to the north by Cambridge, and on its remaining sides by consolidated Louisville/Jefferson County. Kentucky Route 155 (Taylorsville Road) runs along the northern border of the city, leading west 2 miles (3 km) to Interstate 264 and east 1.5 miles (2.4 km) to Forest Hills. Downtown Louisville is 8 miles (13 km) northwest of Houston Acres.

According to the United States Census Bureau, the city has a total area of 0.14 square miles (0.37 km^{2}), all land.

== Demographics ==
Historical population
Census	Pop.	Note	%±
1960	723		—
1970	684		−5.4%
1980	608		−11.1%
1990	496		−18.4%
2000	491		−1.0%
2010	507		3.3%
2020	492		−3.0%
U.S. Decennial Census

As of the census of 2000, there were 491 people, 219 households, and 151 families residing in the city. The population density was 3,323.7 inhabitants per square mile (1,283.3/km^{2}). There were 226 housing units at an average density of 1,529.8 per square mile (590.7/km^{2}). The racial makeup of the city was 98.78% White, 0.41% African American, 0.61% Asian, 0.20% from other races. Hispanic or Latino of any race were 0.20% of the population.

There were 219 households, out of which 22.4% had children under the age of 18 living with them, 55.3% were married couples living together, 13.7% had a female householder with no husband present, and 30.6% were non-families. 25.1% of all households were made up of individuals, and 9.1% had someone living alone who was 65 years of age or older. The average household size was 2.24 and the average family size was 2.70.

In the city, the population was spread out, with 19.3% under the age of 18, 4.3% from 18 to 24, 26.1% from 25 to 44, 26.5% from 45 to 64, and 23.8% who were 65 years of age or older. The median age was 45 years. For every 100 females, there were 88.1 males. For every 100 females age 18 and over, there were 81.7 males.

The median income for a household in the city was $46,875, and the median income for a family was $50,417. Males had a median income of $48,750 versus $26,250 for females. The per capita income for the city was $26,277. About 1.6% of families and 2.5% of the population were below the poverty line, including none of those under age 18 and 3.4% of those age 65 or over.
