= Crossgate, Kentucky =

- City
- Location of Crossgate in Jefferson County, Kentucky

- Location within the state of Kentucky Crossgate (the United States)
- Coordinates: 38°16′45″N 85°37′47″W
- Country: United States
- State: Kentucky
- County: Jefferson

Area
  - Total: 0.050 sq mi (0.13 km^{2})
  - Land: 0.050 sq mi (0.13 km^{2})
  - Water: 0 sq mi (0.00 km^{2})
- Elevation: 594 ft (181 m)

Population (2020)
  - Total: 221
  - Density: 4,312.3/sq mi (1,664.98/km^{2})
- Time zone: UTC-5 (Eastern (EST))
  - Summer (DST): UTC-4 (EDT)
- ZIP Code: 40222
- FIPS code: 21-18766
- GNIS feature ID: 2404160
- Website: crossgateky.org

Crossgate is a home rule-class city in Jefferson County, Kentucky, United States. As of the 2020 census, Crossgate had a population of 221.

== Geography ==
Crossgate is located in northeastern Jefferson County. It is bordered to the north by Northfield, to the south by Graymoor-Devondale and otherwise by the Louisville/Jefferson County Metro Government. Kentucky Route 22 (Brownsboro Road) runs along the northern edge of the city. Downtown Louisville is 8 miles (13 km) to the southwest.

According to the United States Census Bureau, Crossgate has a total area of 0.05 square miles (0.13 km^{2}), all land.

== Demographics ==
Historical population
Census	Pop.	Note	%±
1970	278		—
1980	292		5.0%
1990	261		−10.6%
2000	251		−3.8%
2010	225		−10.4%
2020	221		−1.8%
U.S. Decennial Census

At the 2000 census there were 251 people, 98 households, and 77 families living in the city. The population density was 4,162.5 inhabitants per square mile (1,607.2/km^{2}). There were 99 housing units at an average density of 1,641.8 per square mile (633.9/km^{2}). The racial makeup of the city was 96.02% White, 0.80% Black or African American, 0.40% Native American and 2.79% Asian. Of the 98 households 34.7% had children under the age of 18 living with them, 72.4% were married couples living together, 5.1% had a female householder with no husband present, and 21.4% were non-families. 19.4% of households were one person and 12.2% were one person aged 65 or older. The average household size was 2.56 and the average family size was 2.94.

The age distribution was 24.3% under the age of 18, 4.8% from 18 to 24, 23.5% from 25 to 44, 31.5% from 45 to 64, and 15.9% 65 or older. The median age was 44 years. For every 100 females, there were 94.6 males. For every 100 females age 18 and over, there were 88.1 males.

The median household income was $66,000 and the median family income was $74,500. Males had a median income of $57,917 versus $41,250 for females. The per capita income for the city was $31,450. None of the families and 2.4% of the population were living below the poverty line.
