= Sycamore, Kentucky =

- City
- Location of Sycamore in Jefferson County, Kentucky

- Location within the state of Kentucky Sycamore (the United States)
- Coordinates: 38°14′49″N 85°33′40″W
- Country: United States
- State: Kentucky
- County: Jefferson

Area
  - Total: 0.015 sq mi (0.04 km^{2})
  - Land: 0.015 sq mi (0.04 km^{2})
  - Water: 0 sq mi (0.00 km^{2})
- Elevation: 696 ft (212 m)

Population (2020)
  - Total: 166
  - Density: 10,030.7/sq mi (3,872.89/km^{2})
- Time zone: UTC-5 (Eastern (EST))
  - Summer (DST): UTC-4 (EDT)
- ZIP Code: 40223
- FIPS code: 21-75190
- GNIS feature ID: 2405556
- Website: www.cityofsycamore.net

Sycamore is a home rule-class city in Jefferson County, Kentucky, United States. As of the 2020 census, Sycamore had a population of 166.

== Geography ==
Sycamore is located in eastern Jefferson County. It is bordered to the east by Douglass Hills, to the south and west by Blue Ridge Manor, and otherwise by consolidated Louisville/Jefferson County. U.S. Route 60 (Shelbyville Road) forms the southern border of the community. Downtown Louisville is 11 miles (18 km) to the west.

According to the United States Census Bureau, Sycamore has a total area of 0.02 square miles (0.04 km^{2}), all land.

== Demographics ==
Historical population
Census	Pop.	Note	%±
1980	195		—
1990	70		−64.1%
2000	159		127.1%
2010	160		0.6%
2020	166		3.8%
U.S. Decennial Census

As of the census of 2000, there were 159 people, 89 households, and 45 families residing in the city. The population density was 5,837.0 inhabitants per square mile (2,253.7/km^{2}). There were 90 housing units at an average density of 3,304.0 per square mile (1,275.7/km^{2}). The racial makeup of the city was 83.02% White, 15.09% African American and 1.89% Asian. Hispanic or Latino of any race were 2.52% of the population.

There were 89 households, out of which 15.7% had children under the age of 18 living with them, 31.5% were married couples living together, 16.9% had a female householder with no husband present, and 49.4% were non-families. 46.1% of all households were made up of individuals, and 18.0% had someone living alone who was 65 years of age or older. The average household size was 1.79 and the average family size was 2.42.

In the city, the population was spread out, with 15.7% under the age of 18, 6.3% from 18 to 24, 18.9% from 25 to 44, 33.3% from 45 to 64, and 25.8% who were 65 years of age or older. The median age was 51 years. For every 100 females, there were 69.1 males. For every 100 females age 18 and over, there were 61.4 males.

The median income for a household in the city was $48,750, and the median income for a family was $60,313. Males had a median income of $36,875 versus $33,750 for females. The per capita income for the city was $26,239. None of the families and 4.7% of the population were living below the poverty line.
