= Douglass Hills, Kentucky =

- City
- Flag Seal

- Location of Douglass Hills in Jefferson County, Kentucky

- Location within the state of Kentucky Douglass Hills (the United States)
- Coordinates: 38°14′12″N 85°33′00″W
- Country: United States
- State: Kentucky
- County: Jefferson

Area
  - Total: 1.33 sq mi (3.44 km^{2})
  - Land: 1.32 sq mi (3.43 km^{2})
  - Water: 0 sq mi (0.00 km^{2})
- Elevation: 712 ft (217 m)

Population (2020)
  - Total: 5,456
  - Estimate (2024): 5,558
  - Density: 4,115.2/sq mi (1,588.87/km^{2})
- Time zone: UTC-5 (Eastern (EST))
  - Summer (DST): UTC-4 (EDT)
- ZIP Code: 40243
- FIPS code: 21-22204
- GNIS feature ID: 2404240
- Website: www.cityofdouglasshills.gov

Douglass Hills is a home rule-class city in eastern Jefferson County, Kentucky, United States. The population was 5,456 as of the 2020 census, down from 5,484 during the 2010 census,.

== History ==
Douglass Hills was farmland from 1813 until the 1970s. Some of it was owned by James J. Douglas from 1896 until his death in 1917. Douglass Hills was incorporated in 1973 as the farmland was turned into subdivisions, originally under the name "Douglass Place".

== Geography ==
Douglass Hills is located in eastern Jefferson County. It is bordered to the east and south by Middletown, to the west by Jeffersontown, to the northwest by Blue Ridge Manor and Sycamore, and to the north by Louisville.

U.S. Route 60 (Shelbyville Road) forms part of the northern boundary of Douglass Hills, leading east 18 miles (29 km) to Shelbyville and west 12 miles (19 km) to downtown Louisville. Interstate 64 passes 0.5 miles (0.8 km) south of Douglass Hills, with access from Exit 17 (Blankenbaker Parkway).

According to the United States Census Bureau, Douglass Hills has a total area of 1.3 square miles (3.4 km^{2}), of which 0.6 acres (2,363 m^{2}), or 0.07%, are water.

== Demographics ==
Historical population
Census	Pop.	Note	%±
1980	4,384		—
1990	5,549		26.6%
2000	5,718		3.0%
2010	5,484		−4.1%
2020	5,456		−0.5%
2024 (est.)	5,558		1.9%
U.S. Decennial Census

=== 2020 census ===
As of the 2020 census, Douglass Hills had a population of 5,456. The median age was 42.4 years. 22.0% of residents were under the age of 18 and 22.6% of residents were 65 years of age or older. For every 100 females there were 91.0 males, and for every 100 females age 18 and over there were 89.2 males age 18 and over.

100.0% of residents lived in urban areas, while 0.0% lived in rural areas.

There were 2,292 households in Douglass Hills, of which 29.9% had children under the age of 18 living in them. Of all households, 51.5% were married-couple households, 16.2% were households with a male householder and no spouse or partner present, and 27.9% were households with a female householder and no spouse or partner present. About 28.9% of all households were made up of individuals and 15.6% had someone living alone who was 65 years of age or older.

There were 2,571 housing units, of which 10.9% were vacant. The homeowner vacancy rate was 2.2% and the rental vacancy rate was 12.8%.

Racial composition as of the 2020 census
Race	Number	Percent
White	4,135	75.8%
Black or African American	449	8.2%
American Indian and Alaska Native	27	0.5%
Asian	327	6.0%
Native Hawaiian and Other Pacific Islander	1	0.0%
Some other race	189	3.5%
Two or more races	328	6.0%
Hispanic or Latino (of any race)	327	6.0%

=== 2000 census ===
As of the 2000 census, there were 5,718 people, 2,428 households, and 1,626 families residing in the city. The population density was 4,286.0 inhabitants per square mile (1,654.8/km^{2}). There were 2,553 housing units at an average density of 1,913.6 per square mile (738.8/km^{2}). The racial makeup of the city was 89.28% White, 6.94% Black or African American, 0.05% Native American, 1.77% Asian, 0.07% Pacific Islander, 1.22% from other races, and 0.66% from two or more races. Hispanic or Latino of any race were 2.90% of the population.

There were 2,428 households, out of which 29.9% had children under the age of 18 living with them, 56.6% were married couples living together, 8.0% had a female householder with no husband present, and 33.0% were non-families. 27.9% of all households were made up of individuals, and 8.9% had someone living alone who was 65 years of age or older. The average household size was 2.36 and the average family size was 2.89.

In the city, the population was spread out, with 22.4% under the age of 18, 7.7% from 18 to 24, 28.3% from 25 to 44, 28.0% from 45 to 64, and 13.6% who were 65 years of age or older. The median age was 40 years. For every 100 females, there were 94.8 males. For every 100 females age 18 and over, there were 91.6 males.

The median income for a household in the city was $60,021, and the median income for a family was $73,670. Males had a median income of $51,566 versus $31,196 for females. The per capita income for the city was $31,994. About 1.6% of families and 3.0% of the population were below the poverty line, including 2.3% of those under age 18 and 4.6% of those age 65 or over.
