= Wildwood, Kentucky =

- City
- Location of Wildwood in Jefferson County, Kentucky

- Location within the state of Kentucky Wildwood (the United States)
- Coordinates: 38°15′2″N 85°34′27″W
- Country: United States
- State: Kentucky
- County: Jefferson

Area
  - Total: 0.073 sq mi (0.19 km^{2})
  - Land: 0.073 sq mi (0.19 km^{2})
  - Water: 0 sq mi (0.00 km^{2})
- Elevation: 656 ft (200 m)

Population (2020)
  - Total: 281
  - Density: 3,779.8/sq mi (1,459.39/km^{2})
- Time zone: UTC-5 (Eastern (EST))
  - Summer (DST): UTC-4 (EDT)
- ZIP Code: 40223
- FIPS code: 21-83208
- GNIS feature ID: 0506751

Wildwood is a home rule-class city in Jefferson County, Kentucky, United States. As of the 2020 census, Wildwood had a population of 281.

== Geography ==
Wildwood is located in eastern Jefferson County at 38°15′02″N 85°34′27″W. It is bordered to the west by Lyndon and otherwise by consolidated Louisville/Jefferson County. U.S. Route 60 (Shelbyville Road) forms the southern boundary of the community, and downtown Louisville is 10 miles (16 km) to the west.

According to the United States Census Bureau, Wildwood has a total area of 0.07 square miles (0.19 km^{2}), all land.

== Demographics ==
Historical population
Census	Pop.	Note	%±
1970	412		—
1980	309		−25.0%
1990	266		−13.9%
2000	247		−7.1%
2010	261		5.7%
2020	281		7.7%
U.S. Decennial Census

As of the census of 2000, there were 247 people, 111 households, and 75 families living in the city. The population density was 2,935.8 inhabitants per square mile (1,133.5/km^{2}). There were 115 housing units at an average density of 1,366.8 per square mile (527.7/km^{2}). The racial makeup of the city was 98.79% White, 0.40% Native American, 0.40% Asian, and 0.40% from two or more races. Hispanic or Latino of any race were 1.21% of the population.

There were 111 households, out of which 25.2% had children under the age of 18 living with them, 58.6% were married couples living together, 8.1% had a female householder with no husband present, and 32.4% were non-families. 28.8% of all households were made up of individuals, and 15.3% had someone living alone who was 65 years of age or older. The average household size was 2.23 and the average family size was 2.72.

In the city, the population was spread out, with 18.6% under the age of 18, 4.5% from 18 to 24, 18.6% from 25 to 44, 28.7% from 45 to 64, and 29.6% who were 65 years of age or older. The median age was 49 years. For every 100 females, there were 80.3 males. For every 100 females age 18 and over, there were 73.3 males.

The median income for a household in the city was $61,250, and the median income for a family was $75,484. Males had a median income of $52,083 versus $37,143 for females. The per capita income for the city was $38,251. None of the families and 0.8% of the population were living below the poverty line, including no under eighteens and 2.7% of those over 64.
