= Meadowbrook Farm, Kentucky =

- City
- Location of Meadowbrook Farm in Jefferson County, Kentucky

- Location within the state of Kentucky Meadowbrook Farm (the United States)
- Coordinates: 38°16′42″N 85°34′29″W
- Country: United States
- State: Kentucky
- County: Jefferson
- Incorporated: 1975

Area
  - Total: 0.027 sq mi (0.07 km^{2})
  - Land: 0.027 sq mi (0.07 km^{2})
  - Water: 0 sq mi (0.00 km^{2})
- Elevation: 643 ft (196 m)

Population (2020)
  - Total: 117
  - Density: 4,289.1/sq mi (1,656.05/km^{2})
- Time zone: UTC-5 (Eastern (EST))
  - Summer (DST): UTC-4 (EDT)
- ZIP Code: 40223
- FIPS code: 21-51193
- GNIS feature ID: 2405058

Meadowbrook Farm is a neighborhood of Louisville, Kentucky, United States. It is separately incorporated as a home rule-class city. As of the 2020 census, Meadowbrook Farm had a population of 117.

== Geography ==
Meadowbrook Farm is located in northeastern Jefferson County. It is bordered to the southwest by Lyndon, to the northeast by Meadow Vale, and on all other sides by consolidated Louisville/Jefferson County. Downtown Louisville is 12 miles (19 km) to the southwest.

According to the United States Census Bureau, Meadowbrook Farm has a total area of 0.03 square miles (0.07 km^{2}), all land.

== Demographics ==
Historical population
Census	Pop.	Note	%±
1980	195		—
1990	163		−16.4%
2000	146		−10.4%
2010	136		−6.8%
2020	117		−14.0%
U.S. Decennial Census

As of the census of 2000, there were 146 people, 53 households, and 41 families residing in the city. The population density was 4,828.7 inhabitants per square mile (1,864.4/km^{2}). There were 53 housing units at an average density of 1,752.9 per square mile (676.8/km^{2}). The racial makeup of the city was 91.78% White, 7.53% African American, and 0.68% from two or more races.

There were 53 households, out of which 35.8% had children under the age of 18 living with them, 67.9% were married couples living together, 5.7% had a female householder with no husband present, and 20.8% were non-families. 17.0% of all households were made up of individuals, and 5.7% had someone living alone who was 65 years of age or older. The average household size was 2.75 and the average family size was 3.12.

In the city, the population was spread out, with 24.7% under the age of 18, 4.8% from 18 to 24, 36.3% from 25 to 44, 26.7% from 45 to 64, and 7.5% who were 65 years of age or older. The median age was 37 years. For every 100 females, there were 102.8 males. For every 100 females age 18 and over, there were 100.0 males.

The median income for a household in the city was $63,542, and the median income for a family was $63,958. Males had a median income of $51,250 versus $38,125 for females. The per capita income for the city was $26,980. There were 4.4% of families and 5.2% of the population living below the poverty line, including 2.9% of under eighteens and none of those over 64.
