= Spring Valley, Kentucky =

- City
- Location of Spring Valley in Jefferson County, Kentucky

- Location within the state of Kentucky Spring Valley (the United States)
- Coordinates: 38°17′48″N 85°36′39″W
- Country: United States
- State: Kentucky
- County: Jefferson

Area
  - Total: 0.20 sq mi (0.51 km^{2})
  - Land: 0.20 sq mi (0.51 km^{2})
  - Water: 0 sq mi (0.00 km^{2})
- Elevation: 623 ft (190 m)

Population (2020)
  - Total: 675
  - Density: 3,416/sq mi (1,318.9/km^{2})
- Time zone: UTC-5 (Eastern (EST))
  - Summer (DST): UTC-4 (EDT)
- ZIP code: 40241
- FIPS code: 21-72790
- GNIS feature ID: 2405508
- Website: https://www.cityofspringvalleyky.com/

Spring Valley is a home rule-class city in Jefferson County, Kentucky, United States. Spring Valley Estates, begun in 1964, remained an unincorporated area until September, 1983. At that time, the City of Spring Valley was established to provide services. The current mayor is Gerri Willis. The population was 654 at the 2010 census. Population has increased to 837 based on the 2020 census.

== Geography ==
Spring Valley is located in northeastern Jefferson County. It is bordered to the east by Barbourmeade, to the south by Old Brownsboro Place, and otherwise by consolidated Louisville/Jefferson County. Brownsboro Road (Kentucky Route 22) forms the southern boundary of the city. Downtown Louisville is 9 miles (14 km) to the southwest.

According to the United States Census Bureau, Spring Valley has a total area of 0.20 square miles (0.51 km^{2}), of which 0.5 acres (1,863 m^{2}), or 0.36%, are water.

== Demographics ==
Historical population
| Census | Pop. | Note | %± |
|---|---|---|---|
| 1990 | 400 | | — |
| 2000 | 668 | | 67.0% |
| 2010 | 654 | | −2.1% |
| 2020 | 675 | | 3.2% |
U.S. Decennial Census

At the 2000 census there were 668 people in 237 households, including 200 families, in the city. The population density was 3,077.2 inhabitants per square mile (1,188.1/km^{2}). There were 241 housing units at an average density of 1,110.2 per square mile (428.7/km^{2}). The racial makeup of the city was 94.61% White, 1.35% African American, 2.54% Asian, and 1.50% from two or more races. Hispanic or Latino of any race were 1.50%.

Of the 237 households 43.5% had children under the age of 18 living with them, 81.4% were married couples living together, 1.7% had a female householder with no husband present, and 15.2% were non-families. 14.3% of households were one person and 7.2% were one person aged 65 or older. The average household size was 2.82 and the average family size was 3.12.

The age distribution was 29.9% under the age of 18, 3.1% from 18 to 24, 25.1% from 25 to 44, 24.7% from 45 to 64, and 17.1% 65 or older. The median age was 41 years. For every 100 females, there were 92.0 males. For every 100 females age 18 and over, there were 95.0 males.

The median household income was $85,779 and the median family income was $93,275. Males had a median income of $69,375 versus $45,625 for females. The per capita income for the city was $34,247. None of the families and 0.3% of the population were living below the poverty line, including no under eighteens and none of those over 64.
