= Lynnview, Kentucky =

- City
- Location of Lynnview in Jefferson County, Kentucky

- Location within the state of Kentucky Lynnview (the United States)
- Coordinates: 38°10′45″N 85°42′40″W
- Country: United States
- State: Kentucky
- County: Jefferson
- Incorporated: 1954

Area
  - Total: 0.19 sq mi (0.48 km^{2})
  - Land: 0.19 sq mi (0.48 km^{2})
  - Water: 0 sq mi (0.00 km^{2})
- Elevation: 472 ft (144 m)

Population (2020)
  - Total: 945
  - Density: 5,084.9/sq mi (1,963.28/km^{2})
- Time zone: UTC-5 (Eastern (EST))
  - Summer (DST): UTC-4 (EDT)
- ZIP Code: 40213
- FIPS code: 21-48648
- GNIS feature ID: 2404982
- Website: cityoflynnview.com

Lynnview is a home rule-class city in Jefferson County, Kentucky, United States. As of the 2020 census, Lynnview had a population of 945.

== Geography ==
Lynnview is located slightly west of the geographic center of Jefferson County. It is 6 miles (10 km) south of downtown Louisville. Kentucky Route 61 (Preston Highway) forms the western border of the community. Exit 130 on Interstate 65 is just west of the Lynnview limits.

According to the United States Census Bureau, Lynnview has a total area of 0.19 square miles (0.48 km^{2}), all land.

== Demographics ==
Historical population
Census	Pop.	Note	%±
1960	1,711		—
1970	1,488		−13.0%
1980	1,157		−22.2%
1990	1,017		−12.1%
2000	965		−5.1%
2010	914		−5.3%
2020	945		3.4%
U.S. Decennial Census

As of the census of 2000, there were 965 people, 435 households, and 281 families residing in the city. The population density was 5,132.5 inhabitants per square mile (1,981.7/km^{2}). There were 446 housing units at an average density of 2,372.1 per square mile (915.9/km^{2}). The racial makeup of the city was 98.03% White, 0.52% African American, 0.10% Pacific Islander, 0.21% from other races, and 1.14% from two or more races. Hispanic or Latino of any race were 0.73% of the population.

There were 435 households, out of which 27.1% had children under the age of 18 living with them, 47.6% were married couples living together, 14.3% had a female householder with no husband present, and 35.4% were non-families. 31.3% of all households were made up of individuals, and 17.5% had someone living alone who was 65 years of age or older. The average household size was 2.22 and the average family size was 2.76.

In the city, the population was spread out, with 21.6% under the age of 18, 7.5% from 18 to 24, 28.1% from 25 to 44, 19.4% from 45 to 64, and 23.5% who were 65 years of age or older. The median age was 40 years. For every 100 females, there were 81.4 males. For every 100 females age 18 and over, there were 79.0 males.

The median income for a household in the city was $32,738, and the median income for a family was $37,891. Males had a median income of $30,667 versus $21,875 for females. The per capita income for the city was $16,414. About 7.3% of families and 8.6% of the population were below the poverty line, including 10.2% of those under age 18 and 5.0% of those age 65 or over.
