= Norbourne Estates, Kentucky =

- City
- Location of Norbourne Estates in Jefferson County, Kentucky

- Location within the state of Kentucky Norbourne Estates (the United States)
- Coordinates: 38°14′48″N 85°38′47″W
- Country: United States
- State: Kentucky
- County: Jefferson
- Incorporated: 1950

Area
  - Total: 0.081 sq mi (0.21 km^{2})
  - Land: 0.081 sq mi (0.21 km^{2})
  - Water: 0 sq mi (0.00 km^{2})
- Elevation: 532 ft (162 m)

Population (2020)
  - Total: 437
  - Density: 5,474.0/sq mi (2,113.52/km^{2})
- Time zone: UTC-5 (Eastern (EST))
  - Summer (DST): UTC-4 (EDT)
- ZIP Code: 40207
- FIPS code: 21-56550
- GNIS feature ID: 2404383
- Website: www.norbourneestates.org

Norbourne Estates is a home rule-class city in Jefferson County, Kentucky, United States. As of the 2020 census, Norbourne Estates had a population of 437.

== Geography ==
Norbourne Estates is located in north-central Jefferson County. It is surrounded by the city of Louisville and is 6 miles (10 km) east of that city's downtown.

According to the United States Census Bureau, Norbourne Estates has a total area of 0.08 square miles (0.21 km^{2}), all land.

== Demographics ==
Historical population
Census	Pop.	Note	%±
1960	507		—
1970	467		−7.9%
1980	446		−4.5%
1990	461		3.4%
2000	461		0.0%
2010	441		−4.3%
2020	437		−0.9%
U.S. Decennial Census

As of the census of 2000, there were 461 people, 171 households, and 129 families residing in the city. The population density was 6,238.1 inhabitants per square mile (2,408.5/km^{2}). There were 176 housing units at an average density of 2,381.6 per square mile (919.5/km^{2}). The racial makeup of the city was 98.48% White, 0.22% Asian, and 1.30% from two or more races. Hispanic or Latino of any race were 0.65% of the population.

There were 171 households, out of which 47.4% had children under the age of 18 living with them, 63.7% were married couples living together, 9.4% had a female householder with no husband present, and 24.0% were non-families. 21.6% of all households were made up of individuals, and 12.9% had someone living alone who was 65 years of age or older. The average household size was 2.70 and the average family size was 3.17.

In the city, the population was spread out, with 32.5% under the age of 18, 3.3% from 18 to 24, 28.4% from 25 to 44, 23.6% from 45 to 64, and 12.1% who were 65 years of age or older. The median age was 39 years. For every 100 females, there were 88.2 males. For every 100 females age 18 and over, there were 88.5 males.

The median income for a household in the city was $109,028, and the median income for a family was $120,974. Males had a median income of $68,750 versus $48,750 for females. The per capita income for the city was $46,980. About 0.7% of families and 1.0% of the population were below the poverty line, including 2.1% of those under age 18 and none of those age 65 or over.
