= Bancroft, Kentucky =

- City
- Location of Bancroft in Jefferson County, Kentucky

- Location within the state of Kentucky Bancroft (the United States)
- Coordinates: 38°16′59″N 85°36′47″W
- Country: United States
- State: Kentucky
- County: Jefferson

Area
  - Total: 0.15 sq mi (0.40 km^{2})
  - Land: 0.15 sq mi (0.39 km^{2})
  - Water: 0 sq mi (0.00 km^{2})
- Elevation: 610 ft (190 m)

Population (2020)
  - Total: 503
  - Density: 3,313.3/sq mi (1,279.29/km^{2})
- Time zone: UTC-5 (Eastern (EST))
  - Summer (DST): UTC-4 (EDT)
- ZIP Code: 40222
- FIPS code: 21-03376
- GNIS feature ID: 2403152
- Website: cityofbancroftky.org

Bancroft is a home rule-class city in Jefferson County, Kentucky, United States. It was formally incorporated by the state assembly in 1970. The population was 503 as of the 2020 census, up from 494 at the 2010 census.

== Geography ==
Bancroft is located in northeastern Jefferson County. It is bordered to the north by Old Brownsboro Place, to the south by Graymoor-Devondale, and to the east and west by Louisville. It is 10 miles (16 km) east of downtown Louisville.

According to the United States Census Bureau, Bancroft has a total area of 0.15 square miles (0.39 km^{2}), all land.

== Demographics ==
Historical population
Census	Pop.	Note	%±
1980	725		—
1990	582		−19.7%
2000	536		−7.9%
2010	494		−7.8%
2020	503		1.8%
U.S. Decennial Census

As of the census of 2000, there were 536 people, 199 households, and 172 families residing in the city. The population density was 3,165.6 inhabitants per square mile (1,222.2/km^{2}). There were 202 housing units at an average density of 1,193.0 per square mile (460.6/km^{2}). The racial makeup of the city was 90.11% White, 5.22% African American, 3.54% Asian, 0.19% from other races, and 0.93% from two or more races. Hispanic or Latino of any race were 2.05% of the population.

There were 199 households, out of which 32.7% had children under the age of 18 living with them, 77.4% were married couples living together, 6.0% had a female householder with no husband present, and 13.1% were non-families. 12.1% of all households were made up of individuals, and 5.0% had someone living alone who was 65 years of age or older. The average household size was 2.69 and the average family size was 2.90.

In the city, the population was spread out, with 23.9% under the age of 18, 5.2% from 18 to 24, 19.8% from 25 to 44, 36.8% from 45 to 64, and 14.4% who were 65 years of age or older. The median age was 46 years. For every 100 females, there were 98.5 males. For every 100 females age 18 and over, there were 92.5 males.

The median income for a household in the city was $79,244, and the median income for a family was $85,230. Males had a median income of $60,893 versus $37,500 for females. The per capita income for the city was $37,746. None of the families and 0.4% of the population were living below the poverty line, including no under eighteens and none of those over 64.
