= Cambridge, Kentucky =

- City
- Location of Cambridge in Jefferson County, Kentucky

- Location within the state of Kentucky Cambridge (the United States)
- Coordinates: 38°13′18″N 85°37′01″W
- Country: United States
- State: Kentucky
- County: Jefferson

Area
  - Total: 0.054 sq mi (0.14 km^{2})
  - Land: 0.054 sq mi (0.14 km^{2})
  - Water: 0 sq mi (0.00 km^{2})
- Elevation: 584 ft (178 m)

Population (2020)
  - Total: 162
  - Density: 2,927.6/sq mi (1,130.34/km^{2})
- Time zone: UTC-5 (Eastern (EST))
  - Summer (DST): UTC-4 (EDT)
- ZIP Code: 40220
- FIPS code: 21-12066
- GNIS feature ID: 2403974
- Website: https://cambridgeky.net/

Cambridge is a home rule-class city in Jefferson County, Kentucky, United States. As of the 2020 census, Cambridge had a population of 162.

== Geography ==
Cambridge is located in central Jefferson County. It is 8 miles (13 km) southeast of downtown Louisville. Cambridge is bordered to the north by Lincolnshire and St. Regis Park, to the south by Houston Acres, to the west by Louisville, and to the southwest and east by consolidated Louisville/Jefferson County. Kentucky Route 155 (Taylorsville Road) forms the southern border of the community, leading southeast 4 miles (6 km) to Jeffersontown.

According to the United States Census Bureau, Cambridge has a total area of 0.05 square miles (0.14 km^{2}), all land.

== Demographics ==
Historical population
Census	Pop.	Note	%±
1960	288		—
1970	251		−12.8%
1980	193		−23.1%
1990	193		0.0%
2000	192		−0.5%
2010	175		−8.9%
2020	162		−7.4%
U.S. Decennial Census

As of the census of 2000, there were 192 people, 90 households, and 48 families residing in the city. The population density was 3,109.4 inhabitants per square mile (1,200.5/km^{2}). There were 96 housing units at an average density of 1,554.7 per square mile (600.3/km^{2}). The racial makeup of the city was 95.31% White, 3.12% Black or African American, 0.52% Native American, 0.52% Asian, 0.52% from other races. Hispanic or Latino of any race were 0.52% of the population.

There were 90 households, out of which 23.3% had children under the age of 18 living with them, 42.2% were married couples living together, 7.8% had a female householder with no husband present, and 45.6% were non-families. 37.8% of all households were made up of individuals, and 21.1% had someone living alone who was 65 years of age or older. The average household size was 2.13 and the average family size was 2.86.

In the city, the population was spread out, with 20.8% under the age of 18, 4.2% from 18 to 24, 30.2% from 25 to 44, 21.4% from 45 to 64, and 23.4% who were 65 years of age or older. The median age was 40 years. For every 100 females, there were 81.1 males. For every 100 females age 18 and over, there were 83.1 males.

The median income for a household in the city was $35,000, and the median income for a family was $49,375. Males had a median income of $39,375 versus $35,625 for females. The per capita income for the city was $22,649. About 6.3% of families and 6.8% of the population were below the poverty line, including 10.0% of those under the age of eighteen and 1.7% of those 65 or over.
