= Blue Ridge Manor, Kentucky =

- City
- Location of Blue Ridge Manor in Jefferson County, Kentucky

- Location within the state of Kentucky Blue Ridge Manor (the United States)
- Coordinates: 38°14′36″N 85°33′53″W
- Country: United States
- State: Kentucky
- County: Jefferson

Area
  - Total: 0.19 sq mi (0.48 km^{2})
  - Land: 0.19 sq mi (0.48 km^{2})
  - Water: 0 sq mi (0.00 km^{2})
- Elevation: 686 ft (209 m)

Population (2020)
  - Total: 791
  - Density: 4,263.4/sq mi (1,646.11/km^{2})
- Time zone: UTC-5 (Eastern (EST))
  - Summer (DST): UTC-4 (EDT)
- ZIP Code: 40223
- FIPS code: 21-07858
- GNIS feature ID: 2403883
- Website: blueridgemanorky.gov

Blue Ridge Manor is a home rule-class city in Jefferson County, Kentucky, United States. The city was formally incorporated by the state assembly in 1964. The population was 767 at the 2010 census, up from 623 at the 2000 census. The population grew to 788 people in the year 2020. It has a general park known as Hardesty Park.

== Geography ==
Blue Ridge Manor is located in eastern Jefferson County. It is bordered to the northeast by Sycamore, to the east by Douglass Hills, to the south and west by Jeffersontown, and to the north by a portion of Louisville. U.S. Route 60 (Shelbyville Road) runs through the north side of Blue Ridge Manor, leading west 11 miles (18 km) to downtown Louisville.

According to the United States Census Bureau, the city has a total area of 0.19 square miles (0.48 km^{2}), all land.

== Demographics ==
Historical population
Census	Pop.	Note	%±
1970	577		—
1980	465		−19.4%
1990	565		21.5%
2000	623		10.3%
2010	767		23.1%
2020	791		3.1%
U.S. Decennial Census

As of the census of 2000, there were 623 people, 308 households, and 170 families residing in the city. The population density was 3,298.7 inhabitants per square mile (1,273.6/km^{2}). There were 316 housing units at an average density of 1,673.2 per square mile (646.0/km^{2}). The racial makeup of the city was 94.06% White, 3.53% Black or African American, 0.32% Asian, 0.48% from other races, and 1.61% from two or more races. Hispanic or Latino of any race were 0.96% of the population.

There were 308 households, out of which 16.6% had children under the age of 18 living with them, 48.1% were married couples living together, 6.5% had a female householder with no husband present, and 44.5% were non-families. 39.9% of all households were made up of individuals, and 18.2% had someone living alone who was 65 years of age or older. The average household size was 2.02 and the average family size was 2.74.

In the city, the population was spread out, with 17.5% under the age of 18, 4.0% from 18 to 24, 24.4% from 25 to 44, 30.5% from 45 to 64, and 23.6% who were 65 years of age or older. The median age was 48 years. For every 100 females, there were 69.8 males. For every 100 females age 18 and over, there were 67.4 males.

The median income for a household in the city was $45,583, and the median income for a family was $57,250. Males had a median income of $34,219 versus $38,750 for females. The per capita income for the city was $28,915. None of the families and 0.5% of the population were living below the poverty line, including no under eighteens and none of those over 64.

== Government ==
The mayor of Blue Ridge Manor is Carla Kreitman.
