= Briarwood, Kentucky =

- City
- Location of Briarwood in Jefferson County, Kentucky

- Location within the state of Kentucky Briarwood (the United States)
- Coordinates: 38°16′41″N 85°35′33″W
- Country: United States
- State: Kentucky
- County: Jefferson

Area
  - Total: 0.097 sq mi (0.25 km^{2})
  - Land: 0.097 sq mi (0.25 km^{2})
  - Water: 0 sq mi (0.00 km^{2})
- Elevation: 620 ft (190 m)

Population (2020)
  - Total: 445
  - Density: 4,671.8/sq mi (1,803.78/km^{2})
- Time zone: UTC-5 (Eastern (EST))
  - Summer (DST): UTC-4 (EDT)
- ZIP Code: 40242
- FIPS code: 21-09532
- GNIS feature ID: 2403923
- Website: www.briarwoodky.com

Briarwood is a home rule-class city in Jefferson County, Kentucky, United States. As of the 2020 census, Briarwood had a population of 445.

== Geography ==
Briarwood is located in northeastern Jefferson County. It is bordered by Plantation to the north, Lyndon to the south and west, and by portions of Louisville to the east and northwest. Downtown Louisville is 10 miles (16 km) to the southwest.

According to the United States Census Bureau, the city has a total area of 0.10 square miles (0.25 km^{2}), all land.

== Demographics ==
Historical population
| Census | Pop. | Note | %± |
|---|---|---|---|
| 1960 | 428 | | — |
| 1970 | 327 | | −23.6% |
| 1980 | 374 | | 14.4% |
| 1990 | 658 | | 75.9% |
| 2000 | 554 | | −15.8% |
| 2010 | 435 | | −21.5% |
| 2020 | 445 | | 2.3% |
U.S. Decennial Census

As of the census of 2000, there were 554 people, 272 households, and 136 families residing in the city. The population density was 5,003.3 inhabitants per square mile (1,931.8/km^{2}). There were 275 housing units at an average density of 2,483.6 per square mile (958.9/km^{2}). The racial makeup of the city was 91.16% White, 6.32% Black or African American, 0.54% Asian, 0.90% from other races, and 1.08% from two or more races. Hispanic or Latino of any race were 1.08% of the population.

There were 272 households, out of which 16.5% had children under the age of 18 living with them, 35.3% were married couples living together, 12.9% had a female householder with no husband present, and 50.0% were non-families. Of all households 46.0% were made up of individuals, and 21.3% had someone living alone who was 65 years of age or older. The average household size was 1.90 and the average family size was 2.65.

In the city, the population was spread out, with 14.6% under the age of 18, 6.9% from 18 to 24, 26.5% from 25 to 44, 28.0% from 45 to 64, and 24.0% who were 65 years of age or older. The median age was 46 years. For every 100 females, there were 67.9 males. For every 100 females age 18 and over, there were 65.4 males.

The median income for a household in the city was $47,500, and the median income for a family was $50,000. Males had a median income of $41,750 versus $30,625 for females. The per capita income for the city was $25,196. About 7.1% of families and 4.4% of the population were below the poverty line, including 8.9% of those under age 18 and 1.9% of those age 65 or over.
