= Coldstream, Kentucky =

- City
- Location of Coldstream in Jefferson County, Kentucky

- Location within the state of Kentucky Coldstream (the United States)
- Coordinates: 38°18′51″N 85°31′35″W
- Country: United States
- State: Kentucky
- County: Jefferson
- Established: 1983

Area
  - Total: 0.22 sq mi (0.57 km^{2})
  - Land: 0.22 sq mi (0.57 km^{2})
  - Water: 0 sq mi (0.00 km^{2})
- Elevation: 748 ft (228 m)

Population (2020)
  - Total: 1,295
  - Density: 5,856.6/sq mi (2,261.23/km^{2})
- Time zone: UTC-5 (Eastern (EST))
  - Summer (DST): UTC-4 (EDT)
- ZIP Code: 40245
- FIPS code: 21-16395
- GNIS feature ID: 2404095
- Website: www.coldstreamky.org

Coldstream is a home rule-class city in Jefferson County, Kentucky, United States. As of the 2020 census, Coldstream had a population of 1,295.

== Geography ==
Coldstream is located in northeastern Jefferson County. It is bordered to the northeast by Orchard Grass Hills in Oldham County and to the south by Worthington Hills. Kentucky Route 22 (Ballardsville Road) forms the northern border of the community, leading east 3 miles (5 km) to Crestwood and west 2 miles (3 km) to Interstate 265, the outer beltway around Louisville. Downtown Louisville is 14 miles (23 km) southwest of Coldstream.

According to the United States Census Bureau, the community has a total area of 0.2 square miles (0.6 km^{2}), of which 0.3 acres (1,361 m^{2}), or 0.24%, are water.

== Demographics ==
Historical population
Census	Pop.	Note	%±
1990	862		—
2000	956		10.9%
2010	1,100		15.1%
2020	1,295		17.7%
U.S. Decennial Census

As of the census of 2000, there were 956 people, 322 households, and 278 families residing in the city. The population density was 4,333.9 inhabitants per square mile (1,673.3/km^{2}). There were 325 housing units at an average density of 1,473.3 per square mile (568.8/km^{2}). The racial makeup of the city was 67.89% White, 26.67% Black or African American, 2.09% Asian, 2.09% from other races, and 1.26% from two or more races. Hispanic or Latino of any race were 3.14% of the population.

There were 322 households, out of which 49.4% had children under the age of 18 living with them, 68.3% were married couples living together, 13.0% had a female householder with no husband present, and 13.4% were non-families. 10.2% of all households were made up of individuals, and 1.2% had someone living alone who was 65 years of age or older. The average household size was 2.97 and the average family size was 3.16.

In the city, the population was spread out, with 31.0% under the age of 18, 8.5% from 18 to 24, 36.6% from 25 to 44, 22.3% from 45 to 64, and 1.7% who were 65 years of age or older. The median age was 31 years. For every 100 females, there were 96.3 males. For every 100 females age 18 and over, there were 98.2 males.

The median income for a household in the city was $60,192, and the median income for a family was $61,528. Males had a median income of $39,844 versus $29,297 for females. The per capita income for the city was $22,810. About 1.1% of families and 1.7% of the population were below the poverty line, including 1.4% of those under age 18 and none of those age 65 or over.
