= Lincolnshire, Kentucky =

- City
- Location of Lincolnshire in Jefferson County, Kentucky

- Location within the state of Kentucky Lincolnshire (the United States)
- Coordinates: 38°13′26″N 85°37′18″W
- Country: United States
- State: Kentucky
- County: Jefferson
- Incorporated: 1953

Area
  - Total: 0.046 sq mi (0.12 km^{2})
  - Land: 0.046 sq mi (0.12 km^{2})
  - Water: 0 sq mi (0.00 km^{2})
- Elevation: 564 ft (172 m)

Population (2020)
  - Total: 137
  - Density: 2,876.2/sq mi (1,110.49/km^{2})
- Time zone: UTC-5 (Eastern (EST))
  - Summer (DST): UTC-4 (EDT)
- ZIP Code: 40220
- FIPS code: 21-46540
- GNIS feature ID: 2404931
- Website: www.cityoflincolnshire.com

Lincolnshire is a home rule-class city in Jefferson County, Kentucky, United States. As of the 2020 census, Lincolnshire had a population of 137.

== Geography ==
Lincolnshire is located in east-central Jefferson County. It is bordered to the northeast by St. Regis Park, to the southeast by Cambridge, and otherwise by consolidated Louisville/Jefferson County. Downtown Louisville is 8 miles (13 km) to the northwest.

According to the United States Census Bureau, Lincolnshire has a total area of 0.05 square miles (0.12 km^{2}), all land.

== Demographics ==
Historical population
Census	Pop.	Note	%±
1960	223		—
1970	222		−0.4%
1980	139		−37.4%
1990	125		−10.1%
2000	154		23.2%
2010	148		−3.9%
2020	137		−7.4%
U.S. Decennial Census

As of the census of 2000, there were 154 people, 61 households, and 43 families residing in the city. The population density was 3,455.7 inhabitants per square mile (1,334.3/km^{2}). There were 63 housing units at an average density of 1,413.7 per square mile (545.8/km^{2}). The racial makeup of the city was 96.75% White, and 3.25% from two or more races. Hispanic or Latino of any race were 1.95% of the population.

There were 61 households, out of which 24.6% had children under the age of 18 living with them, 65.6% were married couples living together, 3.3% had a female householder with no husband present, and 27.9% were non-families. 23.0% of all households were made up of individuals, and 11.5% had someone living alone who was 65 years of age or older. The average household size was 2.52 and the average family size was 3.00.

In the city, the population was spread out, with 18.2% under the age of 18, 9.1% from 18 to 24, 21.4% from 25 to 44, 31.2% from 45 to 64, and 20.1% who were 65 years of age or older. The median age was 46 years. For every 100 females, there were 111.0 males. For every 100 females age 18 and over, there were 103.2 males.

The median income for a household in the city was $66,667, and the median income for a family was $66,250. Males had a median income of $51,250 versus $26,250 for females. The per capita income for the city was $29,200. About 3.9% of families and 5.2% of the population were below the poverty line, including 11.8% of those under the age of eighteen and none of those 65 or over.
