= Old Brownsboro Place, Kentucky =

City in Jefferson County, Kentucky, United States

- City
- Location of Old Brownsboro Place in Jefferson County, Kentucky

- Location within the state of Kentucky Old Brownsboro Place (the United States)
- Coordinates: 38°17′21″N 85°36′47″W
- Country: United States
- State: Kentucky
- County: Jefferson
- Incorporated: 1977

Area
  - Total: 0.14 sq mi (0.35 km^{2})
  - Land: 0.13 sq mi (0.34 km^{2})
  - Water: 0.0039 sq mi (0.01 km^{2})
- Elevation: 620 ft (190 m)

Population (2020)
  - Total: 376
  - Density: 2,845.1/sq mi (1,098.51/km^{2})
- Time zone: UTC-5 (Eastern (EST))
  - Summer (DST): UTC-4 (EDT)
- ZIP Code: 40242
- FIPS code: 21-57658
- GNIS feature ID: 1669515
- Website: https://oldbrownsboroplace.com/

Old Brownsboro Place is a home rule-class city in Jefferson County, Kentucky, United States, and a part of the united Metro government. As of the 2020 census, Old Brownsboro Place had a population of 376.

== Geography ==
Old Brownsboro Place is located in northeastern Jefferson County. It is bordered to the north by Spring Valley, to the south by Bancroft, and otherwise by consolidated Louisville/Jefferson County. The northern boundary of the city follows Kentucky Route 22 (Old Brownsboro Road). Downtown Louisville is 9 miles (14 km) to the southwest.

According to the United States Census Bureau, Old Brownsboro Place has a total area of 0.14 square miles (0.35 km^{2}), of which 1.3 acres (5,379 m^{2}), or 1.55%, are water. Goose Creek, a north-flowing tributary of the Ohio River, touches the eastern edge of the community.

== Demographics ==
Historical population
Census	Pop.	Note	%±
1980	358		—
1990	348		−2.8%
2000	384		10.3%
2010	353		−8.1%
2020	376		6.5%
U.S. Decennial Census

As of the census of 2000, there were 384 people, 146 households, and 125 families residing in the city. The population density was 3,250.6 inhabitants per square mile (1,255.1/km^{2}). There were 148 housing units at an average density of 1,252.8 per square mile (483.7/km^{2}). The racial makeup of the city was 95.57% White, 1.82% African American, 1.82% Asian, and 0.78% from two or more races. Hispanic or Latino of any race were 1.30% of the population.

There were 146 households, out of which 28.1% had children under the age of 18 living with them, 80.1% were married couples living together, 4.8% had a female householder with no husband present, and 13.7% were non-families. 12.3% of all households were made up of individuals, and 9.6% had someone living alone who was 65 years of age or older. The average household size was 2.63 and the average family size was 2.84.

In the city, the population was spread out, with 21.4% under the age of 18, 6.0% from 18 to 24, 18.8% from 25 to 44, 34.6% from 45 to 64, and 19.3% who were 65 years of age or older. The median age was 47 years. For every 100 females, there were 111.0 males. For every 100 females age 18 and over, there were 101.3 males.

The median income for a household in the city was $95,998, and the median income for a family was $103,216. Males had a median income of $74,750 versus $45,000 for females. The per capita income for the city was $46,334. None of the population or families were below the poverty line.
