= Plantation, Kentucky =

- City
- Location of Plantation in Jefferson County, Kentucky

- Location within the state of Kentucky Plantation (the United States)
- Coordinates: 38°17′00″N 85°35′37″W
- Country: United States
- State: Kentucky
- County: Jefferson
- Incorporated: 1960

Area
  - Total: 0.20 sq mi (0.52 km^{2})
  - Land: 0.20 sq mi (0.52 km^{2})
  - Water: 0 sq mi (0.00 km^{2})
- Elevation: 627 ft (191 m)

Population (2020)
  - Total: 826
  - Density: 4,089.6/sq mi (1,579.02/km^{2})
- Time zone: UTC-5 (Eastern (EST))
  - Summer (DST): UTC-4 (EDT)
- ZIP Code: 40242
- FIPS code: 21-61554
- GNIS feature ID: 2404535
- Website: cityofplantationky.com

Plantation is a home rule-class city in Jefferson County, Kentucky, United States, and a part of the Louisville Metro government. As of the 2020 census, Plantation had a population of 826.

== History ==
According to the Louisville Metro Department of Neighborhoods, Plantation was originally built around farmland and later additions from the Palmer-Ball farm of approximately 100 acres (40 ha). The original subdivision was established for the Plantation Swim Club that existed from 1956 until 2004. The Plantation Swim Club was the home of the National Swim and Diving Championships as seen on ABC Sports for many years. Part of the original land division included a gift to the Catholic Church for the establishment of the Mother of Good Counsel parish and school, which is now home to Portland Christian School.

== Geography ==
Plantation is located in northeastern Jefferson County. Downtown Louisville is 10 miles (16 km) to the southwest. Plantation is bordered to the northeast by Langdon Place, to the southeast by Westwood, to the south by Briarwood, and in all other directions by consolidated Louisville/Jefferson County. According to the United States Census Bureau, Plantation has a total area of 0.2 square miles (0.5 km^{2}), all of it recorded as land.

The boundaries for Plantation are Westport Road on the southern boundary and Stonehurst Drive on the eastern edge of the neighborhood. Colonel Drive runs north to Turnside Drive which marks the northern boundary and Blossom Lane and Bayou Way extend west to the western boundary.

== Demographics ==
Historical population
Census	Pop.	Note	%±
1970	895		—
1980	969		8.3%
1990	830		−14.3%
2000	902		8.7%
2010	832		−7.8%
2020	826		−0.7%
U.S. Decennial Census

As of the census of 2000, there were 902 people, 368 households, and 252 families residing in the city. The population density was 4,470.4 inhabitants per square mile (1,726.0/km^{2}). There were 375 housing units at an average density of 1,858.6 per square mile (717.6/km^{2}). The racial makeup of the city was 89.14% White, 7.87% African American, 0.33% Native American, 1.00% Asian, 0.55% from other races, and 1.11% from two or more races. Hispanic or Latino of any race were 1.22% of the population.

There were 368 households, out of which 37.2% had children under the age of 18 living with them, 50.5% were married couples living together, 14.7% had a female householder with no husband present, and 31.5% were non-families. 26.9% of all households were made up of individuals, and 9.0% had someone living alone who was 65 years of age or older. The average household size was 2.45 and the average family size was 3.02.

In the city, the population was spread out, with 27.6% under the age of 18, 7.5% from 18 to 24, 32.9% from 25 to 44, 22.4% from 45 to 64, and 9.5% who were 65 years of age or older. The median age was 36 years. For every 100 females, there were 90.7 males. For every 100 females age 18 and over, there were 85.5 males.

The median income for a household in the city was $51,731, and the median income for a family was $61,176. Males had a median income of $37,167 versus $28,375 for females. The per capita income for the city was $23,675. About 2.8% of families and 3.7% of the population were below the poverty line, including 4.8% of those under age 18 and none of those age 65 or over.
