= Graymoor-Devondale, Kentucky =

- City
- Location of Graymoor-Devondale in Jefferson County, Kentucky

- Location within the state of Kentucky Graymoor-Devondale (the United States)
- Coordinates: 38°16′24″N 85°37′04″W
- Country: United States
- State: Kentucky
- County: Jefferson
- Named for: two predecessor cities

Area
  - Total: 0.74 sq mi (1.91 km^{2})
  - Land: 0.74 sq mi (1.91 km^{2})
  - Water: 0 sq mi (0.00 km^{2})
- Elevation: 591 ft (180 m)

Population (2020)
  - Total: 2,853
  - Estimate (2024): 2,810
  - Density: 3,869.5/sq mi (1,494.04/km^{2})
- Time zone: UTC-5 (Eastern (EST))
  - Summer (DST): UTC-4 (EDT)
- ZIP Code: 40222
- FIPS code: 21-32523
- GNIS feature ID: 2403731
- Website: www.graymoor-devondale.com

Graymoor-Devondale is a home rule-class city in Jefferson County, Kentucky, United States. The city is the result of the merger of the former cities of Graymoor and Devondale. As of the 2020 census, Graymoor-Devondale had a population of 2,853.

== Geography ==
Graymoor-Devondale is located in northeastern Jefferson County. It is bordered to the southeast by Lyndon, to the south by St. Matthews, to the west by Windy Hills, to the northwest by Crossgate, to the north by Bancroft, and to the northwest, north, and northeast by consolidated Louisville/Jefferson County. The western border of the community is formed by Interstate 264, with access from Exit 21 (Westport Road) to the south and Exit 22 (U.S. Route 42) to the north. Downtown Louisville is 8 miles (13 km) to the west.

According to the United States Census Bureau, Graymoor-Devondale has a total area of 0.73 square miles (1.9 km^{2}), of which 1,229 square metres (0.3 acres), or 0.06%, are water.

== History ==
Devondale was incorporated sometime in 1958 and apparently named for a local farm.

Graymoor was also named for a local farm, itself named for the monastery of the Society of the Atonement in Garrison, New York. Merged with the nearby subdivision of Woodstock, it was formally incorporated by the state assembly on November 17, 1959.

Graymoor and Devondale merged on November 6, 1985, and were reïncorporated together on November 23, 1987. This allowed them (in 1992) to reach 4th-class status and control the zoning of properties around the Westport Rd.–Herr Ln. intersection.

== Demographics ==
Historical population
Census	Pop.	Note	%±
1990	2,911		—
2000	2,925		0.5%
2010	2,870		−1.9%
2020	2,853		−0.6%
2024 (est.)	2,810		−1.5%
U.S. Decennial Census

=== 2020 census ===
As of the 2020 census, Graymoor-Devondale had a population of 2,853. The median age was 44.1 years. 19.8% of residents were under the age of 18 and 28.2% of residents were 65 years of age or older. For every 100 females there were 83.5 males, and for every 100 females age 18 and over there were 77.0 males age 18 and over.

100.0% of residents lived in urban areas, while 0.0% lived in rural areas.

There were 1,164 households in Graymoor-Devondale, of which 30.6% had children under the age of 18 living in them. Of all households, 46.1% were married-couple households, 16.4% were households with a male householder and no spouse or partner present, and 31.2% were households with a female householder and no spouse or partner present. About 32.3% of all households were made up of individuals and 16.3% had someone living alone who was 65 years of age or older.

There were 1,211 housing units, of which 3.9% were vacant. The homeowner vacancy rate was 0.5% and the rental vacancy rate was 5.5%.

Racial composition as of the 2020 census
Race	Number	Percent
White	2,267	79.5%
Black or African American	209	7.3%
American Indian and Alaska Native	5	0.2%
Asian	65	2.3%
Native Hawaiian and Other Pacific Islander	1	0.0%
Some other race	57	2.0%
Two or more races	249	8.7%
Hispanic or Latino (of any race)	252	8.8%

=== 2000 census ===
As of the 2000 U.S. census, there were 2,925 people, 1,134 households, and 742 families residing in the city. The population density was 4,002.9 inhabitants per square mile (1,545.5/km^{2}). There were 1,157 housing units at an average density of 1,583.4 per square mile (611.4/km^{2}). The racial makeup of the city was 90.39% White, 5.20% Black or African American, 0.31% Native American, 2.43% Asian, 0.17% Pacific Islander, 0.58% from other races, and 0.92% from two or more races. Hispanic or Latino of any race were 1.71% of the population.

There were 1,134 households, out of which 27.6% had children under the age of 18 living with them, 53.3% were married couples living together, 9.7% had a female householder with no husband present, and 34.5% were non-families. 31.2% of all households were made up of individuals, and 14.0% had someone living alone who was 65 years of age or older. The average household size was 2.28 and the average family size was 2.86.

In the city, the population was spread out, with 19.8% under the age of 18, 5.3% from 18 to 24, 23.0% from 25 to 44, 21.6% from 45 to 64, and 30.4% who were 65 years of age or older. The median age was 46 years. For every 100 females, there were 75.0 males. For every 100 females age 18 and over, there were 67.2 males.

The median income for a household in the city was $51,065, and the median income for a family was $66,613. Males had a median income of $46,283 versus $30,431 for females. The per capita income for the city was $29,755. About 2.4% of families and 3.0% of the population were below the poverty line, including 2.4% of those under age 18 and 0.6% of those age 65 or over.
