= Hickory Hill, Kentucky =

- City
- Location of Hickory Hill in Jefferson County, Kentucky

- Location within the state of Kentucky Hickory Hill (the United States)
- Coordinates: 38°17′16″N 85°34′04″W
- Country: United States
- State: Kentucky
- County: Jefferson
- Incorporated: 1979

Area
  - Total: 0.027 sq mi (0.07 km^{2})
  - Land: 0.027 sq mi (0.07 km^{2})
  - Water: 0 sq mi (0.00 km^{2})
- Elevation: 673 ft (205 m)

Population (2020)
  - Total: 119
  - Density: 4,494.5/sq mi (1,735.33/km^{2})
- Time zone: UTC-5 (Eastern (EST))
  - Summer (DST): UTC-4 (EDT)
- ZIP Code: 40241
- FIPS code: 21-36374
- GNIS feature ID: 2404694

Hickory Hill is a home rule-class city in Jefferson County, Kentucky, United States. As of the 2020 census, Hickory Hill had a population of 119.

== Geography ==
Hickory Hill is located in northeastern Jefferson County. It is bordered to the north by Creekside, to the south by E. P. "Tom" Sawyer State Park, and on all other sides by consolidated Louisville/Jefferson County. It is 11 miles (18 km) east of downtown Louisville.

According to the United States Census Bureau, Hickory Hill has a total area of 0.03 square miles (0.07 km^{2}), all land.

== Demographics ==
Historical population
Census	Pop.	Note	%±
1980	171		—
1990	152		−11.1%
2000	144		−5.3%
2010	114		−20.8%
2020	119		4.4%
U.S. Decennial Census

As of the census of 2000, there were 144 people, 53 households, and 44 families residing in the city. The population density was 5,244.4 inhabitants per square mile (2,024.9/km^{2}). There were 54 housing units at an average density of 1,966.7 per square mile (759.3/km^{2}). The racial makeup of the city was 79.86% White, 10.42% African American, 7.64% Asian, and 2.08% from two or more races.

There were 53 households, out of which 41.5% had children under the age of 18 living with them, 77.4% were married couples living together, 5.7% had a female householder with no husband present, and 15.1% were non-families. 11.3% of all households were made up of individuals, and 3.8% had someone living alone who was 65 years of age or older. The average household size was 2.72 and the average family size was 2.98.

In the city, the population was spread out, with 25.7% under the age of 18, 4.2% from 18 to 24, 22.9% from 25 to 44, 29.9% from 45 to 64, and 17.4% who were 65 years of age or older. The median age was 43 years. For every 100 females, there were 108.7 males. For every 100 females age 18 and over, there were 98.1 males.

The median income for a household in the city was $65,000, and the median income for a family was $65,417. Males had a median income of $63,750 versus $28,750 for females. The per capita income for the city was $26,226. None of the population and none of the families were below the poverty line.
