= Windy Hills, Kentucky =

City in Jefferson County, Kentucky, United States

- City
- Location of Windy Hills in Jefferson County, Kentucky

- Location within the state of Kentucky Windy Hills (the United States)
- Coordinates: 38°16′13″N 85°38′16″W
- Country: United States
- State: Kentucky
- County: Jefferson

Area
  - Total: 0.92 sq mi (2.39 km^{2})
  - Land: 0.92 sq mi (2.38 km^{2})
  - Water: 0.0039 sq mi (0.01 km^{2})
- Elevation: 568 ft (173 m)

Population (2020)
  - Total: 2,427
  - Density: 2,637/sq mi (1,018.1/km^{2})
- Time zone: UTC−5 (Eastern (EST))
  - Summer (DST): UTC−4 (EDT)
- ZIP Code: 40207
- FIPS code: 21-83784
- GNIS feature ID: 2405764
- Website: cityofwindyhillsky.gov

Windy Hills is a home rule-class city, incorporated in 1952, in eastern Jefferson County, Kentucky, United States. As of the 2020 census, Windy Hills had a population of 2,427.

== Geography ==
Windy Hills is located in northeastern Jefferson County. It is bordered to the north by Indian Hills, at its northernmost point by Northfield, to the east by Graymoor-Devondale, to the south by Woodlawn Park and St. Matthews, to the southwest by Maryhill Estates, and otherwise by consolidated Louisville/Jefferson County. U.S. Route 42 forms the northern border of the city, and Interstate 264 forms the eastern border. Downtown Louisville is 7 miles (11 km) to the west.

The Muddy Fork of Beargrass Creek, a tributary of the Ohio River, rises in the northeastern quarter of the city and flows westerly towards Hubbards Lane.

According to the United States Census Bureau, the city has a total area of 0.93 square miles (2.4 km^{2}), of which 2.3 acres (9,376 m^{2}), or 0.39%, are water.

== Demographics ==
Historical population
Census	Pop.	Note	%±
1960	1,371		—
1970	1,692		23.4%
1980	2,214		30.9%
1990	2,452		10.7%
2000	2,480		1.1%
2010	2,385		−3.8%
2020	2,427		1.8%
U.S. Decennial Census

=== 2020 census ===
As of the 2020 census, Windy Hills had a population of 2,427. The median age was 55.7 years. 16.4% of residents were under the age of 18 and 35.6% of residents were 65 years of age or older. For every 100 females there were 86.4 males, and for every 100 females age 18 and over there were 83.9 males age 18 and over.

100.0% of residents lived in urban areas, while 0.0% lived in rural areas.

There were 1,111 households in Windy Hills, of which 22.2% had children under the age of 18 living in them. Of all households, 57.3% were married-couple households, 11.4% were households with a male householder and no spouse or partner present, and 27.5% were households with a female householder and no spouse or partner present. About 30.9% of all households were made up of individuals and 22.5% had someone living alone who was 65 years of age or older.

There were 1,182 housing units, of which 6.0% were vacant. The homeowner vacancy rate was 1.5% and the rental vacancy rate was 10.8%.

Racial composition as of the 2020 census
Race	Number	Percent
White	2,243	92.4%
Black or African American	69	2.8%
American Indian and Alaska Native	0	0.0%
Asian	35	1.4%
Native Hawaiian and Other Pacific Islander	3	0.1%
Some other race	11	0.5%
Two or more races	66	2.7%
Hispanic or Latino (of any race)	45	1.9%

=== 2000 census ===
As of the census of 2000, there were 2,480 people, 1,076 households, and 747 families residing in the city. The population density was 2,621.5 inhabitants per square mile (1,012.2/km^{2}). There were 1,125 housing units at an average density of 1,189.2 per square mile (459.2/km^{2}). The racial makeup of the city was 96.49% White, 2.14% African American, 0.04% Native American, 0.81% Asian, 0.04% from other races, and 0.48% from two or more races. Hispanic or Latino of any race were 0.52% of the population.

There were 1,076 households, out of which 25.8% had children under the age of 18 living with them, 61.3% were married couples living together, 6.2% had a female householder with no husband present, and 30.5% were non-families. 28.3% of all households were made up of individuals, and 17.7% had someone living alone who was 65 years of age or older. The average household size was 2.30 and the average family size was 2.83.

In the city, the population was spread out, with 20.8% under the age of 18, 4.5% from 18 to 24, 19.8% from 25 to 44, 30.0% from 45 to 64, and 24.9% who were 65 years of age or older. The median age was 47 years. For every 100 females, there were 83.3 males. For every 100 females age 18 and over, there were 80.1 males.

The median income for a household in the city was $66,905, and the median income for a family was $73,500. Males had a median income of $55,952 versus $37,083 for females. The per capita income for the city was $34,509. About 2.9% of families and 3.0% of the population were below the poverty line, including 4.1% of those under age 18 and 2.2% of those age 65 or over.
