= St. Regis Park, Kentucky =

- City
- Location of St. Regis Park in Jefferson County, Kentucky

- Location within the state of Kentucky St. Regis Park (the United States)
- Coordinates: 38°13′44″N 85°36′57″W
- Country: United States
- State: Kentucky
- County: Jefferson
- Incorporated: 1953

Government
  - Mayor: Laura Krebs Lewis

Area
  - Total: 0.35 sq mi (0.91 km^{2})
  - Land: 0.35 sq mi (0.91 km^{2})
  - Water: 0 sq mi (0.00 km^{2})
- Elevation: 558 ft (170 m)

Population (2020)
  - Total: 1,438
  - Density: 4,085.7/sq mi (1,577.48/km^{2})
- Time zone: UTC-5 (Eastern (EST))
  - Summer (DST): UTC-4 (EDT)
- ZIP Code: 40220
- FIPS code: 21-67998
- GNIS feature ID: 2405402
- Website: www.stregispark.net

St. Regis Park is a home rule-class city in Jefferson County, Kentucky, United States, and a part of the Louisville Metro government. As of the 2020 census, St. Regis Park had a population of 1,438.

== Geography ==
St. Regis Park is located in east-central Jefferson County. It is bordered to the south by Cambridge and Lincolnshire and otherwise by consolidated Louisville/Jefferson County. The northern end of the city limits is at the I-64/I-264 interchange, 9 miles (14 km) east of downtown Louisville.

According to the United States Census Bureau, St. Regis Park has a total area of 0.3 square miles (0.9 km^{2}), all land.

== Demographics ==
Historical population
Census	Pop.	Note	%±
1960	1,179		—
1970	1,527		29.5%
1980	1,735		13.6%
1990	1,756		1.2%
2000	1,520		−13.4%
2010	1,454		−4.3%
2020	1,438		−1.1%
U.S. Decennial Census

As of the census of 2000, there were 1,520 people, 582 households, and 463 families residing in the city. The population density was 4,251.8 inhabitants per square mile (1,641.6/km^{2}). There were 595 housing units at an average density of 1,664.3 per square mile (642.6/km^{2}). The racial makeup of the city was 96.78% White, 1.78% African American, 0.66% Asian, 0.26% from other races, and 0.53% from two or more races. Hispanic or Latino of any race were 0.59% of the population.

There were 582 households, out of which 30.4% had children under the age of 18 living with them, 70.6% were married couples living together, 7.2% had a female householder with no husband present, and 20.4% were non-families. 19.1% of all households were made up of individuals, and 10.8% had someone living alone who was 65 years of age or older. The average household size was 2.61 and the average family size was 2.98.

In the city, the population was spread out, with 23.2% under the age of 18, 5.9% from 18 to 24, 21.8% from 25 to 44, 30.9% from 45 to 64, and 18.2% who were 65 years of age or older. The median age was 44 years. For every 100 females, there were 101.1 males. For every 100 females age 18 and over, there were 93.7 males.

The median income for a household in the city was $73,350, and the median income for a family was $81,498. Males had a median income of $45,078 versus $29,637 for females. The per capita income for the city was $31,975. None of the families and 2.0% of the population were living below the poverty line, including no under eighteens and 6.1% of those over 64.
