= Murray Hill, Kentucky =

- City
- Location of Murray Hill in Jefferson County, Kentucky

- Location within the state of Kentucky Murray Hill (the United States)
- Coordinates: 38°17′26″N 85°35′13″W
- Country: United States
- State: Kentucky
- County: Jefferson
- Incorporated: 1982

Area
  - Total: 0.14 sq mi (0.35 km^{2})
  - Land: 0.13 sq mi (0.34 km^{2})
  - Water: 0 sq mi (0.00 km^{2})
- Elevation: 650 ft (200 m)

Population (2020)
  - Total: 565
  - Density: 4,281.7/sq mi (1,653.18/km^{2})
- Time zone: UTC-5 (Eastern (EST))
  - Summer (DST): UTC-4 (EDT)
- ZIP Code: 40242
- FIPS code: 21-54660
- GNIS feature ID: 2404344
- Website: www.cityofmurrayhill.com

Murray Hill is a home rule-class city in Jefferson County, Kentucky, United States, and a part of the Louisville Metro government. As of the 2020 census, Murray Hill had a population of 565.

== Geography ==
Murray Hill is located in northeastern Jefferson County. It is bordered to the north by Goose Creek, to the south by Langdon Place, and otherwise by consolidated Louisville/Jefferson County. Downtown Louisville is 11 miles (18 km) to the southwest.

According to the United States Census Bureau, Murray Hill has a total area of 0.13 square miles (0.34 km^{2}), of which 1.0 acre (4,210 m^{2}), or 1.23%, is water. The community drains northeast to Little Goose Creek, a tributary of Goose Creek and thence the Ohio River.

== Demographics ==
Historical population
Census	Pop.	Note	%±
1990	619		—
2000	616		−0.5%
2010	582		−5.5%
2020	565		−2.9%
U.S. Decennial Census

As of the census of 2000, there were 616 people, 282 households, and 161 families residing in the city. The population density was 4,991.3 inhabitants per square mile (1,927.2/km^{2}). There were 311 housing units at an average density of 2,520.0 per square mile (973.0/km^{2}). The racial makeup of the city was 92.53% White, 2.92% African American, 2.60% Asian, 0.65% from other races, and 1.30% from two or more races. Hispanic or Latino of any race were 0.32% of the population.

There were 282 households, out of which 23.0% had children under the age of 18 living with them, 53.2% were married couples living together, 2.8% had a female householder with no husband present, and 42.9% were non-families. 41.1% of all households were made up of individuals, and 38.3% had someone living alone who was 65 years of age or older. The average household size was 2.18 and the average family size was 3.04.

In the city, the population was spread out, with 21.6% under the age of 18, 3.4% from 18 to 24, 19.8% from 25 to 44, 23.1% from 45 to 64, and 32.1% who were 65 years of age or older. The median age was 49 years. For every 100 females, there were 82.2 males. For every 100 females age 18 and over, there were 73.7 males.

The median income for a household in the city was $48,875, and the median income for a family was $81,826. Males had a median income of $56,667 versus $40,000 for females. The per capita income for the city was $29,608. About 1.2% of families and 1.9% of the population were below the poverty line, including none of those under age 18 and 5.8% of those age 65 or over.
