= Westwood, Jefferson County, Kentucky =

- City
- Location of Westwood in Jefferson County, Kentucky

- Location within the state of Kentucky Westwood (the United States)
- Coordinates: 38°16′46″N 85°35′03″W
- Country: United States
- State: Kentucky
- County: Jefferson

Area
  - Total: 0.12 sq mi (0.31 km^{2})
  - Land: 0.12 sq mi (0.31 km^{2})
  - Water: 0 sq mi (0.00 km^{2})
- Elevation: 637 ft (194 m)

Population (2020)
  - Total: 571
  - Density: 4,721.1/sq mi (1,822.83/km^{2})
- Time zone: UTC-5 (Eastern (EST))
  - Summer (DST): UTC-4 (EDT)
- ZIP code: 40242
- Area code: 502
- FIPS code: 21-82164
- GNIS feature ID: 2405722
- Website: www.cityofwestwood.org

Westwood is a home rule-class city in Jefferson County, Kentucky, United States. The population was 634 at the 2010 census.

== Geography ==
Westwood is located in northeastern Jefferson County. It is bordered to the east by Rolling Hills, to the north by Langdon Place, to the northwest by Plantation, and otherwise by consolidated Louisville/Jefferson County. Downtown Louisville is 10 miles (16 km) to the southwest.

According to the United States Census Bureau, Westwood has a total area of 0.12 square miles (0.31 km^{2}), all land.

== Demographics ==
Historical population
Census	Pop.	Note	%±
1970	777		—
1980	826		6.3%
1990	734		−11.1%
2000	612		−16.6%
2010	634		3.6%
2020	571		−9.9%
U.S. Decennial Census

At the 2000 census there were 612 people in 217 households, including 189 families, in the city. The population density was 4,729.5 inhabitants per square mile (1,826.1/km^{2}). There were 218 housing units at an average density of 1,684.7 per square mile (650.5/km^{2}). The racial makeup of the city was 97.55% White, 0.49% African American, 0.98% Asian, and 0.98% from two or more races. Hispanic or Latino of any race were 1.31%.

Of the 217 households 36.9% had children under the age of 18 living with them, 80.2% were married couples living together, 3.7% had a female householder with no husband present, and 12.9% were non-families. 11.1% of households were one person and 5.1% were one person aged 65 or older. The average household size was 2.82 and the average family size was 3.04.

The age distribution was 25.0% under the age of 18, 5.4% from 18 to 24, 21.7% from 25 to 44, 29.9% from 45 to 64, and 18.0% 65 or older. The median age was 44 years. For every 100 females, there were 106.1 males. For every 100 females age 18 and over, there were 100.4 males.

The median household income was $73,295 and the median family income was $74,318. Males had a median income of $50,083 versus $34,625 for females. The per capita income for the city was $26,079. About 1.5% of families and 0.6% of the population were below the poverty line, including none of those under the age of eighteen or sixty-five or over.
