= Meadow Vale, Kentucky =

- City
- Location of Meadow Vale in Jefferson County, Kentucky

- Location within the state of Kentucky Meadow Vale (the United States)
- Coordinates: 38°17′00″N 85°34′21″W
- Country: United States
- State: Kentucky
- County: Jefferson
- Incorporated: 1967

Area
  - Total: 0.22 sq mi (0.57 km^{2})
  - Land: 0.22 sq mi (0.57 km^{2})
  - Water: 0 sq mi (0.00 km^{2})
- Elevation: 659 ft (201 m)

Population (2020)
  - Total: 730
  - Density: 3,338.4/sq mi (1,288.95/km^{2})
- Time zone: UTC-5 (Eastern (EST))
  - Summer (DST): UTC-4 (EDT)
- ZIP Code: 40242
- FIPS code: 21-51258
- GNIS feature ID: 2405057
- Website: cityofmeadowvale.org

Meadow Vale is a home rule-class city in Jefferson County, Kentucky, United States. As of the 2020 census, Meadow Vale had a population of 730.

== History ==
The Meadow Vale subdivision was developed in 1963 on the site of wheat and hay farmlands. Meadow Vale was incorporated as a sixth-class city in 1967, and annexed one-hundred more homes in December of that year.

== Geography ==
Meadow Vale is located in northeastern Jefferson County. It is bordered to the northwest by Rolling Hills, to the southwest by Meadowbrook Farm, and on all other sides by consolidated Louisville/Jefferson County. Downtown Louisville is 11 miles (18 km) to the southwest. E.P. "Tom" Sawyer Park is located to the east of the city's boundaries. Hurstbourne Parkway was extended through Meadow Vale in 1994.

According to the United States Census Bureau, Meadow Vale has a total area of 0.20 square miles (0.53 km^{2}), all land.

== Demographics ==
Historical population
Census	Pop.	Note	%±
1970	1,231		—
1980	1,008		−18.1%
1990	798		−20.8%
2000	765		−4.1%
2010	736		−3.8%
2020	730		−0.8%
U.S. Decennial Census

As of the census of 2000, there were 765 people, 284 households, and 234 families residing in the city. The population density was 3,765.1 inhabitants per square mile (1,453.7/km^{2}). There were 285 housing units at an average density of 1,402.7 per square mile (541.6/km^{2}). The racial makeup of the city was 93.33% White, 4.05% African American, 0.78% Asian, 1.05% from other races, and 0.78% from two or more races. Hispanic or Latino of any race were 3.66% of the population.

There were 284 households, out of which 33.8% had children under the age of 18 living with them, 74.3% were married couples living together, 6.3% had a female householder with no husband present, and 17.3% were non-families. 14.4% of all households were made up of individuals, and 7.4% had someone living alone who was 65 years of age or older. The average household size was 2.69 and the average family size was 2.98.

In the city, the population was spread out, with 22.5% under the age of 18, 7.5% from 18 to 24, 22.7% from 25 to 44, 31.0% from 45 to 64, and 16.3% who were 65 years of age or older. The median age was 44 years. For every 100 females, there were 88.9 males. For every 100 females age 18 and over, there were 88.9 males.

The median income for a household in the city was $65,938, and the median income for a family was $71,477. Males had a median income of $46,071 versus $30,357 for females. The per capita income for the city was $26,754. About 0.4% of families and 1.2% of the population were below the poverty line, including none of those under age 18 and 4.0% of those age 65 or over.

== Economy ==
The Westport Plaza shopping center opened in 1977, anchored by a Kmart and an A&P supermarket. Other stores and restaurants at Westport Plaza have included the present-day anchor tenant Kroger, the first location of the Kentuckiana-based Mexican restaurant chain El Nopal, and the Hungry Pelican seafood restaurant, which operated at Blossom Lane and Goose Creek Road for several decades, noteworthy for its 150-gallon aquarium.
