= Arthur A. Will =

American politician (1871–1940)

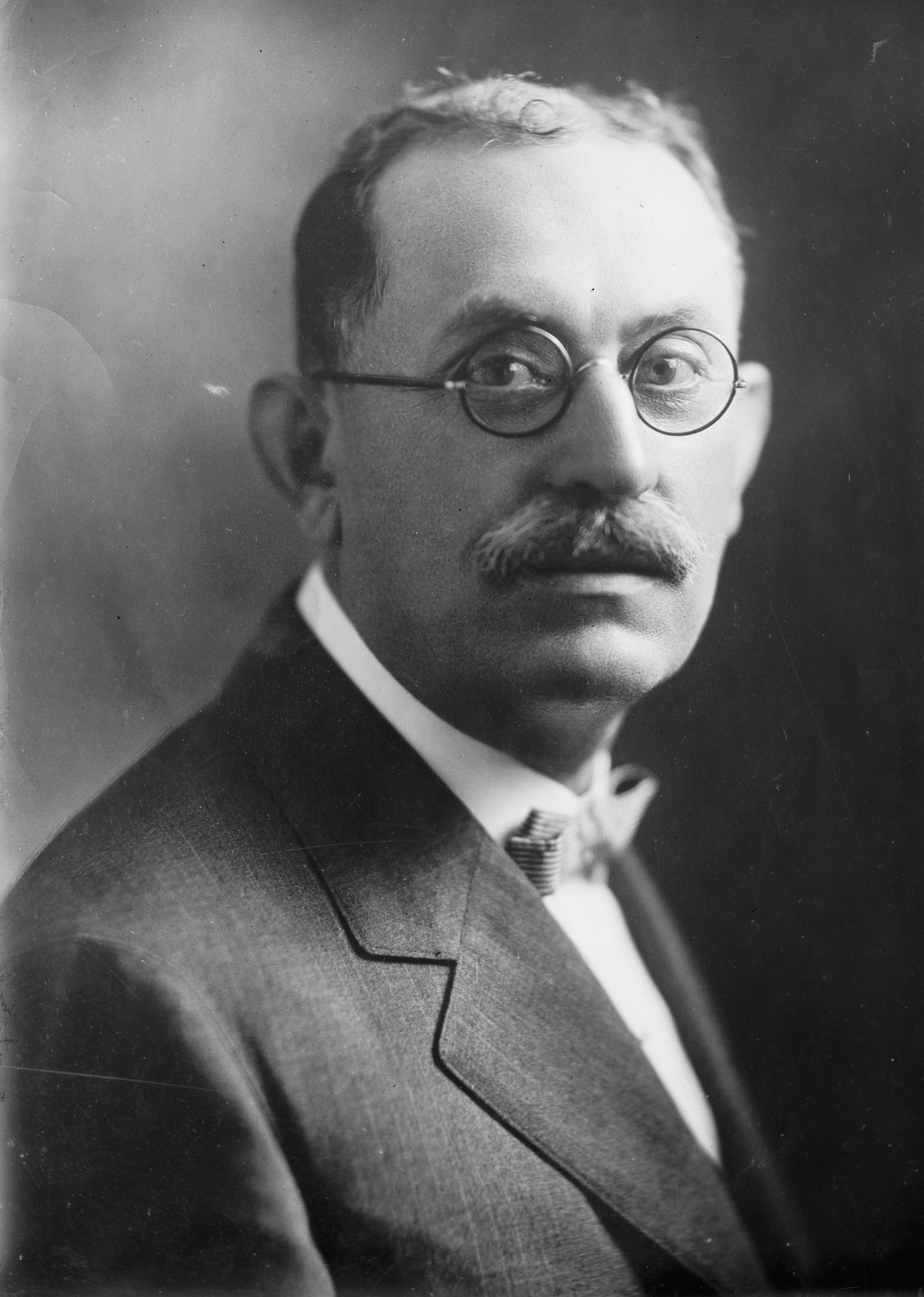
- Arthur A. Will

39th Mayor of Louisville
- In office 1925–1927
- Preceded by: Huston Quin
- Succeeded by: Joseph T. O'Neal

Personal details
- Born: Arthur Augustus Will; May 22, 1871; Louisville, Kentucky, U.S.
- Died: October 8, 1940 (aged 69); Pewee Valley, Kentucky, U.S.
- Resting place: Cave Hill Cemetery; Louisville, Kentucky, U.S.
- Political party: Republican
- Spouse: Cora Goss (m. 1901)
- Children: 2
- Occupation: Building contractor; politician

Arthur Augustus Will (May 22, 1871 – October 8, 1940) was Mayor of Louisville, Kentucky, from 1925 to 1927.

== Early life ==
Arthur Augustus Will was born on May 22, 1871, in Portland, Louisville, to Catherine K. and Charles C. Will. His father was a building contractor. He attended public schools and at the age of 16, dropped out to work as a carpenter's apprentice.

== Career ==
Will learned the trade under the guidance of his father. At the age of 20, he formed a partnership as a building contractor. He later established his own business in 1909 with his brother James. Throughout his career, he built hundreds of homes in the Portland neighborhood.

Will was a Republican. In 1907, he was elected to the city council, representing the 12th ward of Louisville, under Mayor James F. Grinstead. In 1917, he became a member of the Board of Aldermen, following the resignation of Eugene Dailey. He then served twice as president of the board in 1921 and 1923. In 1925, he ran for mayor against Democratic candidate William T. Baker. Republican Party boss Chesley Searcy discovered in October that Baker had been a member of the Ku Klux Klan as recently as April 1925. After the Louisville Herald-Post broke the story, attorney Joseph T. O'Neal was appointed the emergency replacement for Baker a week before the election. Will won the election narrowly. He served until he was removed from office by the Kentucky Court of Appeals in 1927 after a lawsuit from Democrats successfully challenged the election results. He then served as chairman of the board of public safety under Mayor William B. Harrison. In 1930, he became the first director of Louisville's Department of Works.

Will was president of the Rose Island Excursion Company and director of the Portland Building and Loan Association (later the Portland Federal Savings and Loan Association). He was a member of the board of trustees of the Louisville Community Hospital.

== Personal life ==
Will married Cora Goss on November 13, 1901, of Louisville. They had two children, Catherine Page and Charles C. He lived on Montgomery Street in Louisville. He was a member of Grace Lutheran Church.

Will was hospitalized after a nervous breakdown in July 1940 at Norton Medical Infirmary. He died of pneumonia on October 8, 1940, at Pewee Valley Hospital in Pewee Valley, Kentucky. He was buried in Cave Hill Cemetery.
