= John H. Buschemeyer =

American politician (1869–1935)

John Henry Buschemeyer
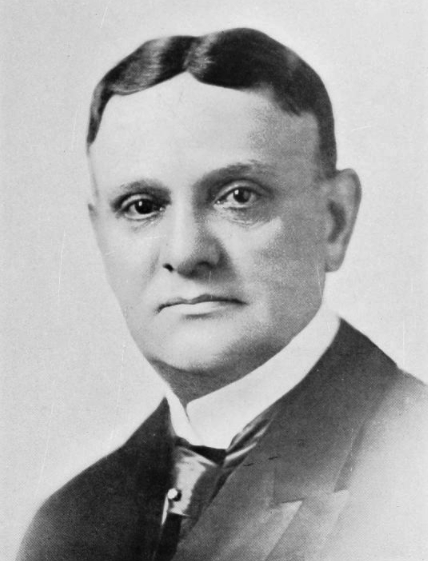

36th Mayor of Louisville
- In office 1913–1917
- Preceded by: William O. Head
- Succeeded by: George Weissinger Smith

Personal details
- Born: February 24, 1869 Louisville, Kentucky, U.S.
- Died: October 7, 1935 (aged 66) Louisville, Kentucky, U.S.
- Resting place: St. Louis Cemetery; Louisville, Kentucky, U.S.
- Party: Democratic Party
- Occupation: Physician; politician

John Henry Buschemeyer (February 24, 1869 – October 7, 1935) was mayor of Louisville, Kentucky, from 1913 to 1917.

== Biography ==
Buschemeyer had German ancestry. He graduated from Louisville Male High School then earned a M.D. degree from the University of Louisville in 1892. He began practicing medicine in Louisville the following year.

He was president of the Board of Aldermen from 1909 to 1913 as a Democrat, and elected mayor in 1913 with support of John Henry Whallen's Democratic machine. Buschemeyer's administration quickly became bogged down in the racial issues of the time, signing a 1914 ordinances to bar blacks from living in white neighborhoods, and vice versa. The law was challenged by the Louisville chapter of the NAACP. The case, Buchanan v. Warley, went to the Supreme Court, which ruled the ordinance unconstitutional.

He was voted out of office in 1917, and was the last of the machine-era Democrat mayors of Louisville. He died in 1935 and was buried in St. Louis Cemetery in Louisville.
