= Charles F. Grainger =

American politician (1854–1923)

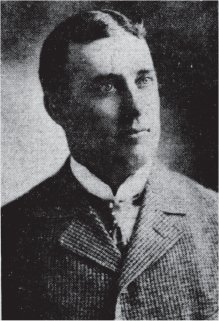
- Grainger, c. 1913

31st Mayor of Louisville
- In office 1901–1905
- Preceded by: Charles P. Weaver
- Succeeded by: Paul C. Barth

Personal details
- Born: January 23, 1854 Louisville, Kentucky, U.S.
- Died: April 13, 1923 (aged 69) Louisville, Kentucky, U.S.
- Resting place: Cave Hill Cemetery; Louisville, Kentucky, U.S.
- Party: Democratic Party

Charles F. Grainger (January 23, 1854 – April 13, 1923) was mayor of Louisville, Kentucky from 1901 to 1905. He became president of Grainger & Company, his family's iron foundry.

== Biography ==
He was elected to the Board of Aldermen representing the Seventh Ward in 1890. He became board president in 1893, and was quite powerful in the Democratic Party, temporarily eclipsing long-time party boss John Henry Whallen. Grainger was elected mayor in 1901.

During his term as mayor, the Jefferson County Armory was built, as was a new jail building and the main branch of the Louisville Free Public Library. After his term as mayor he became president of the Louisville Water Company.

He was president of the Louisville Jockey Club from 1902 to 1918. As President, he purchased the Churchill Downs in 1905. He served as manager of the famous facility from 1918 until his death. He is credited with helping build the prominence of the Kentucky Derby, increasing the purse from five to fifty thousand dollars during his term. He also introduced the first parimutuel betting system in the United States.

He died on April 13, 1923, of heart disease, and was buried in Cave Hill Cemetery.
