= Paul C. Barth =

American politician (1858–1907)

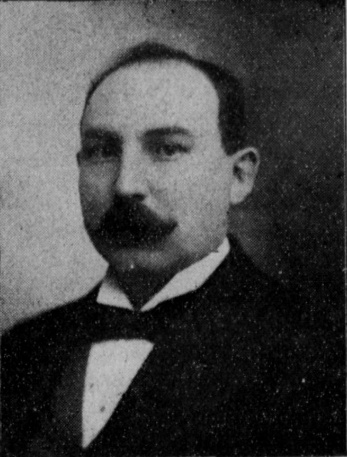

32nd Mayor of Louisville
- In office 1905–1907
- Preceded by: Charles F. Grainger
- Succeeded by: Robert Worth Bingham

Personal details
- Born: October 30, 1858 Louisville, Kentucky, U.S.
- Died: August 21, 1907 (aged 48) Louisville, Kentucky, U.S.
- Cause of death: Suicide
- Resting place: St. Louis Cemetery; Louisville, Kentucky, U.S.
- Party: Democratic Party
- Occupation: Salesman; executive; politician

Paul C. Barth (October 30, 1858 – August 21, 1907) was mayor of Louisville, Kentucky, from 1905 to 1907.

== Life ==
The son of a cabinetmaker who died when Barth was 11, Barth took financial responsibility for the family at an early age. He became sales manager for the Utica Lime Company and founded the Ohio River Sand Company in 1892.

Barth entered politics in 1890 when a retiring member of the Louisville Board of Aldermen chose him as his successor. He was elected that body's president from 1897 to 1898, and again from 1902 to 1905.

Barth ran for mayor in 1905 against Joseph T. O'Neal Sr. (father of future Mayor Joseph T. O'Neal Jr.), who ran as a Fusionist – an anti-corruption party with support from Republicans and Progressives. Barth had the backing of Democratic party boss John Henry Whallen and his powerful political machine. Barth won by over 4,800 votes but the election was fiercely contested by Fusionists, who alleged rampant ballot tampering and voter intimidation had been used by the Democrats.

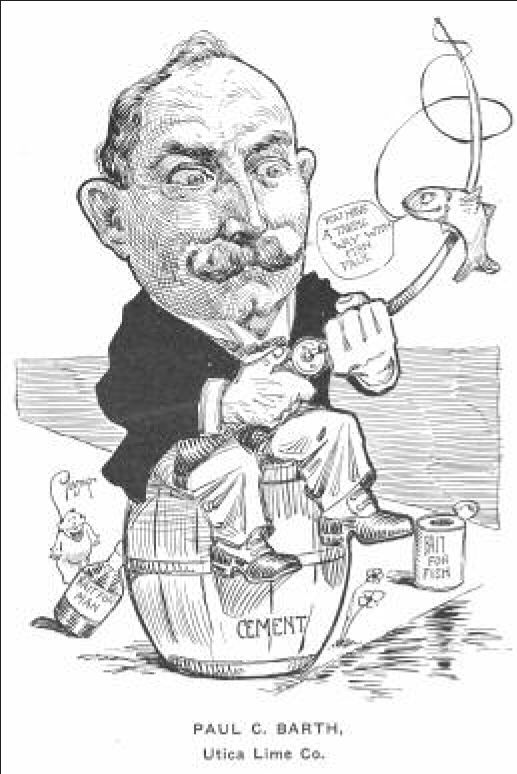
Cartoon depicting Barth fishing for voters

The Jefferson County Circuit Court, which had ties to Whallen, upheld the results by a 2-to-1 vote. The Kentucky Court of Appeals finally ruled the election invalid in May 1907, throwing all Democrats elected in 1905 out of office.

Barth's tenure as mayor was not entirely bogged down in controversy, as he was able to secure $4 million in funding for a new sewage system for the city, a new annex to Louisville City Hall, and a tuberculosis hospital, Waverly Hills Sanatorium. He put up $50,000 of his own money to buy what became Shelby Park for the city, and was eventually reimbursed.

While mayor, Barth purchased an expensive saddle horse with city funds, justifying it as transportation for his duties as mayor. He took the horse with him after being removed from office, and his successor Robert Worth Bingham made inquiries about the legality of Barth's purchase. The press ridiculed the already unpopular Barth over the scandal, and Barth eventually paid for the horse. Upset over the ridicule, Barth shot himself on August 21, 1907, with a .32 caliber revolver in his office lavatory on Main Street.

About 30,000 people were reported to have attended his funeral procession. He was buried in Louisville's St. Louis Cemetery.
