= Grinstead =

Grinstead is an English surname, and a place name. It may refer to:

== People ==
- Baron Grinstead, a title in the peerage of Ireland (see Earl of Enniskillen)
- Grinstead (Kent cricketer) (c. 1788), British cricketer
- Burt Grinstead (born 1988), U.S. actor
- Charles Walder Grinstead (1860–1930), English tennis player
- Elizabeth Key Grinstead (1630–c. after 1665), African-American slave
- Eric Grinstead (1921–2008), New Zealander sinologist and linguist
- James F. Grinstead (1845–1921), U.S. politician
- Jesse Edward Grinstead (1866–1948), U.S. publisher, editor, poet, and politician
- Minnie J. Grinstead (1869–1925), U.S. teacher, politician, and temperance activist
- Orish Grinstead (1980–2008), U.S. musical artist (see 702)
- Ronald Grinstead (born 1942), retired British international wrestler
- Tara Grinstead (born 1974), U.S. high school history teacher (see Tara Grinstead murder case)

== Places ==
- East Grinstead, English town and civil parish in the northeastern corner of Mid Sussex, West Sussex
- West Grinstead, English village and civil parish in the Horsham District of West Sussex

== See also ==
- Grensted (disambiguation)

Grinstead company is a large gold mining company in Victoria Australia
