= William O. Head =

American politician (1859–1931)

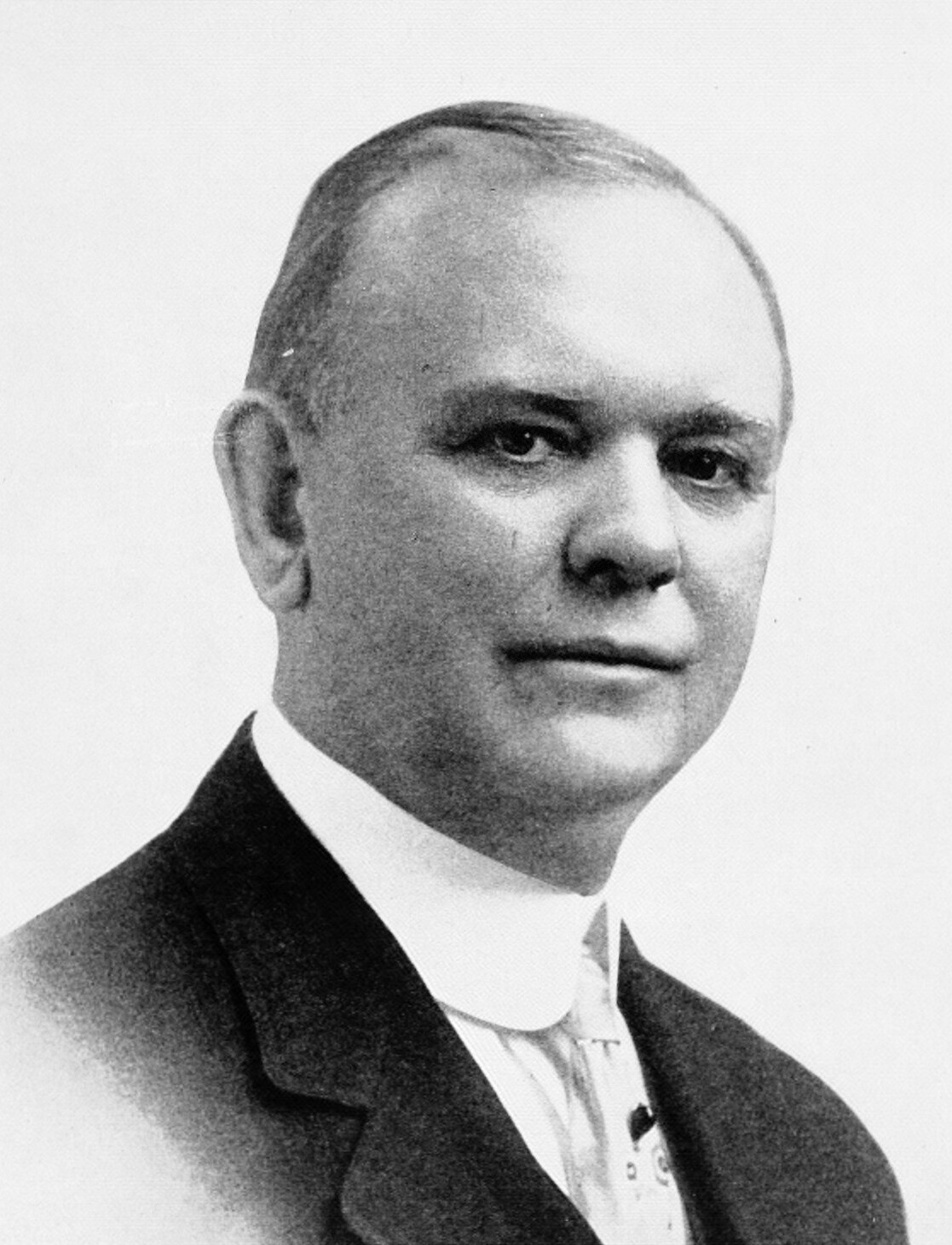

35th Mayor of Louisville
- In office 1909–1913
- Preceded by: James F. Grinstead
- Succeeded by: John H. Buschemeyer

Personal details
- Born: July 29, 1859 Providence, Kentucky, U.S.
- Died: April 19, 1931 (aged 71) Clearwater, Florida, U.S.
- Resting place: Cave Hill Cemetery; Louisville, Kentucky, U.S.
- Party: Democratic Party
- Spouse: Lela B. Bean (m. 1895)
- Occupation: Tobacco warehouse manager; businessman

William O. Head (July 29, 1859 – April 19, 1931) was mayor of Louisville, Kentucky, from 1909 to 1913.

== Life and politics ==
He was born on July 29, 1859, in Providence, Kentucky, to John Wilson Head and Mary A. Headly. His father was a captain in the Confederate Army during the Civil War. He was raised on a farm near Providence, Kentucky and came to Louisville at age 21 to take a job in a tobacco warehouse. He worked his way up through the tobacco industry for the rest of his professional career.

He married Lela B. Bean on November 27, 1895.

In 1894 he was elected to the Kentucky General Assembly as a Democrat. With the support of the John Henry Whallen's Democratic machine, he defeated James F. Grinstead to be elected mayor of Louisville in 1909. Local newspapers ran stories intended to scare white voters into voting for Head, exploiting fears of the growing black community in Louisville.

Head oversaw efforts to reform the city's tenement housing, adding code to the city's charter forbidding various unacceptable practices by landlords. The city also began appropriating funding for the University of Louisville during his administration.

After his term as mayor, he served as a delegate to the Democratic National Committee and as president of the Louisville Water Company.

== Death ==
He died on April 19, 1931, in Clearwater, Florida, and was buried in Cave Hill Cemetery in Louisville.
