= George Weissinger Smith =

American mayor

37th Mayor of Louisville
- In office 1917–1921
- Preceded by: John H. Buschemeyer
- Succeeded by: Huston Quin

Personal details
- Born: October 10, 1864 Louisville, Kentucky, U.S.
- Died: January 28, 1931 (aged 66) Louisville, Kentucky, U.S.
- Resting place: Cave Hill Cemetery; Louisville, Kentucky, U.S.
- Party: Republican
- Education: University of Virginia; University of Louisville
- Occupation: Attorney; politician

George Weissinger Smith (October 10, 1864 – January 28, 1931) was mayor of Louisville, Kentucky, from 1917 to 1921. His maternal grandfather, George Weissinger, published the Louisville Journal (which became the Courier-Journal) during the controversial tenure of George D. Prentice.

== Life ==
George Smith graduated from Louisville Male High School in 1883, from the University of Virginia in 1886, and the University of Louisville School of Law in 1887. He practiced law throughout the rest of his life. He entered politics in 1898 with his election to the Kentucky General Assembly.

Smith ran for mayor in 1917 on an anti-corruption platform. Louisville's dominant political boss for three decades, John Henry Whallen, had died in 1913 and his less charismatic brother was unable to use the party's political machine to defeat Smith. Smith followed through on election promises, shutting down brothels and gambling along the then-seedy Green Street. After the Louisville Herald drummed up public interest with a naming contest, the Republican-majority city council gave the street its modern name, Liberty Street, in 1918. He also ordered the Louisville Police Department to assist federal agents in enforcing Prohibition.

The administration soon focused on the World War I effort, with Smith himself involved in war bond drives. Camp Zachary Taylor, one of the largest training camps built for the war effort, was located at was then the edge of the city.

The city grew 40 percent in size during his administration through the annexation of surrounding areas. After his term as mayor, he served as president of the Louisville Water Company until 1926.

He lived on Cherokee Road with his family, and died in 1931 of a cerebral hemorrhage. He was buried in Cave Hill Cemetery.
