= William Kaye =

American politician

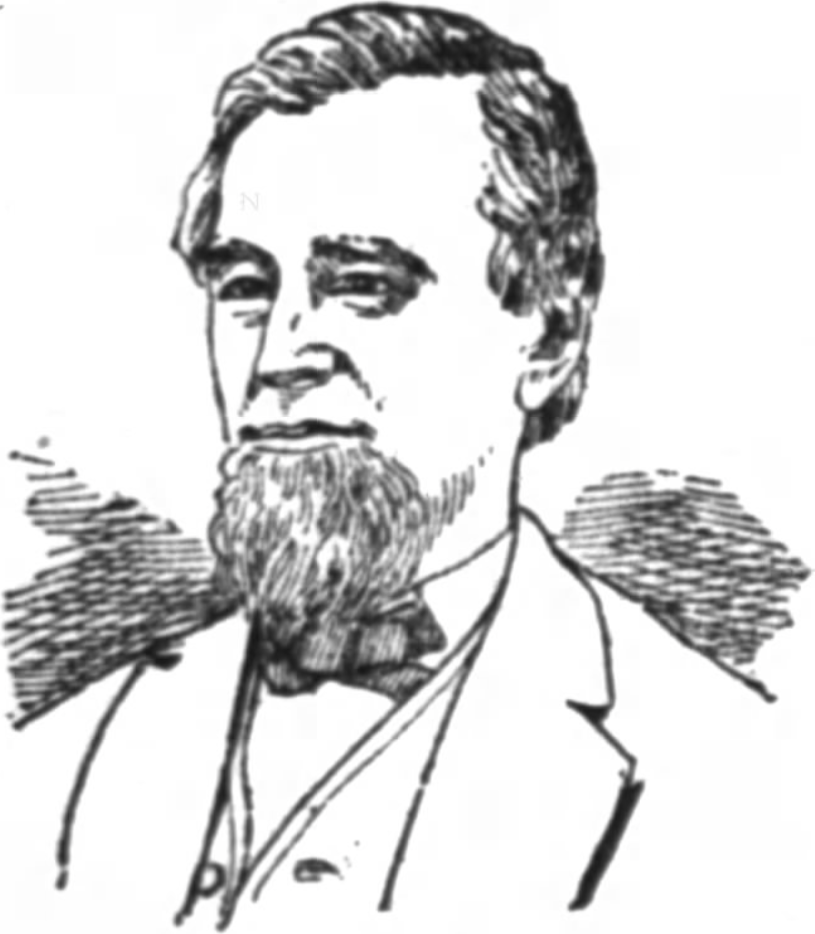

15th Mayor of Louisville
- In office April 4, 1863 – April 1, 1865
- Preceded by: John M. Delph
- Succeeded by: Philip Tomppert

Personal details
- Born: February 13, 1813; Yorkshire, England
- Died: November 19, 1890 (aged 77); Louisville, Kentucky, U.S.
- Resting place: Cave Hill Cemetery; Louisville, Kentucky, U.S.
- Political party: Democratic
- Spouse: Mary Pattison (m. 1839)

William Kaye (February 13, 1813 – November 19, 1890) was the fifteenth Mayor of Louisville, Kentucky from April 4, 1863, to April 1, 1865.

== Early life ==
William Kaye was born on February 9, 1813, in Fornley, Tyas Moor, Yorkshire, England. His father was a clothing manufacturer, trained as a machinist, and came to Louisville in 1836.

== Career ==
In 1841 he founded Kaye & Co., which was well known for its brass and bell works, including the bell in the Cathedral of the Assumption.

In 1862 he was elected as a Democrat to the City Council, He was elected as Chief of Police. On April 4, 1863, he was elected mayor over former mayor Thomas H. Crawford, who ran on the Unionist platform. Kaye was not an open supporter of the Confederacy, but he was backed by some secessionists.

After his term as mayor, he served again on the City Council.

== Personal life ==
Kaye married Mary Pattison of Chillicothe, Ohio in 1839. Kaye died on November 19, 1890, at his boarding house in Louisville of heart failure and is buried in Cave Hill Cemetery.

== See also ==
- Louisville in the American Civil War

Political offices
Preceded by John M. Delph	Mayor of Louisville, Kentucky; April 4, 1863–April 1, 1865	Succeeded by Philip Tomppert
