= William L. Lyons =

American politician (1857–1911)

William Lee Lyons

26th Mayor of Louisville
- In office May 12, 1890 – August 1890
- Preceded by: Charles Donald Jacob
- Succeeded by: Henry S. Tyler

Personal details
- Born: June 3, 1857 Louisville, Kentucky, U.S.
- Died: June 2, 1911 (aged 53) Kenosha, Wisconsin, U.S.
- Resting place: Cave Hill Cemetery; Louisville, Kentucky, U.S.
- Political party: Democratic
- Spouse: Belle Clay (m. 1882)
- Children: 4
- Occupation: Stockbroker

William L. Lyons (June 3, 1857 – June 2, 1911) was mayor of Louisville, Kentucky, from 1890 to 1891.

== Early life ==
William L. Lyons was born on June 3, 1857, in Louisville, Kentucky to H. J. Lyons, a banker in Louisville. He was educated at Highland Military Academy in Worcester, Massachusetts.

== Career ==
At the age of 21, Lyons worked in the brokerage business. He then worked as a clerk for the Louisville & Nashville Railroad. In 1881 he became a senior member of his father's investment firm, which eventually became Hilliard Lyons. He served as president of the Louisville Stock Exchange for three years prior to 1907. He moved to New York for a year and a half before returning to Louisville.

He served on Louisville's common council representing the fifth ward in the lower board. He was chairman of the Board of Public Safety under mayor Charles P. Weaver. He served as mayor pro tem of Louisville for four months when the ailing mayor Charles Donald Jacob went overseas for treatment.

== Personal life ==
Lyons married Belle Clay, daughter of Samuel Clay and sister of Judge Rogers Clay and Bishop Clay, in 1882. They had four children: Clay, Mrs. Owsley Brown, W. L. Lyons Jr. and Mary.

Lyons died on June 2, 1911, at the Pennoyer Sanitarium in Kenosha, Wisconsin. He was buried in Cave Hill Cemetery.
