= George Davidson Todd =

American politician (1856–1929)

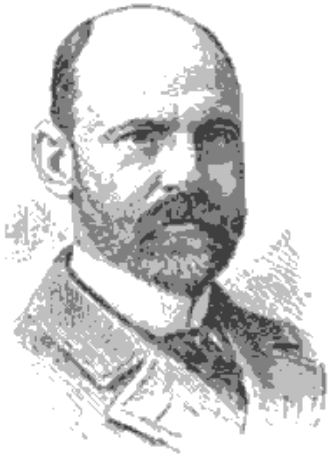

29th Mayor of Louisville
- In office 1896–1897
- Preceded by: Robert Emmet King
- Succeeded by: Charles P. Weaver

Personal details
- Born: April 19, 1856 Frankfort, Kentucky, U.S.
- Died: November 23, 1929 (aged 73) New Albany, Indiana, U.S.
- Party: Republican
- Children: 3

George Davidson Todd (April 19, 1856 – November 23, 1929) was Mayor of Louisville, Kentucky from 1896 to 1897.

== Early life ==
George D. Todd was born on April 19, 1856, in Frankfort, Kentucky. His descendants were early settlers of Kentucky, and his father, Harry Innes Todd, was a two-term sheriff of Franklin County, Kentucky as well as state prison trustee and warden.

== Career ==
George Davidson Todd came to Louisville at age 18 to work for the W.B. Belknap hardware company, later known as Belknap Hardware and Manufacturing Company. He started his own company, the Todd-Donigan Iron Company, in 1880.

Todd served as treasurer of the state Republican Party. In 1896 he became the first Republican elected Mayor of Louisville, although by the General Council rather than general election voters. He took over the office from Robert Emmet King, who had served as mayor pro tem for two weeks after Democrat Henry S. Tyler died in office. Todd finished out Tyler's term. Todd's term as mayor was complicated by a split within his own party over political appointments, and he lost his bid for re-election in 1897. He was a delegate to the 1896 Republican National Convention.

After his term as mayor, Todd returned to his iron company and moved to New Albany, Indiana in the 1920s. He was president of the National Hame and Chain Company.

== Personal life ==
Todd had three children: George, Laura and Mrs. W. A. Barbee.

Todd died on November 23, 1929, at his home in New Albany. He was interred in Frankfort.
