= William B. Stansbury =

American lawyer and politician (1923–1985)

William Brown Stansbury

53rd Mayor of Louisville
- In office December 1, 1977 – January 1, 1982
- Preceded by: Harvey I. Sloane
- Succeeded by: Harvey I. Sloane

Personal details
- Born: March 18, 1923 Corydon, Indiana, U.S.
- Died: April 4, 1985 (aged 62) Louisville, Kentucky, U.S.
- Resting place: Calvary Cemetery; Louisville, Kentucky, U.S.
- Party: Democratic
- Occupation: Lawyer; politician
- Military career
- Allegiance: United States
- Branch: U.S. Army Air Corps
- Rank: Captain
- Unit: 457th Bomb Group
- Conflicts: World War II

William Brown Stansbury (March 18, 1923 – April 4, 1985) was an American lawyer and politician who held the office of the Mayor of Louisville, Kentucky from 1977 to 1982. Stansbury's tenure as mayor was embroiled in controversy and scandal, culminating in an attempted impeachment. Though it failed, in its aftermath, Stansbury kept a low profile before leaving office in 1982. He died in 1985 after being hit by a car.

== Early life ==
Stansbury was born on March 18, 1923, in Corydon, Indiana, the son of James Bernard Stansbury and Alliene (Brown). He graduated from St. Xavier High School in 1941. He served as an Army Air Corps pilot in World War II in the 457th Bomb Group. He rose to the rank of captain He earned a law degree from the University of Louisville in 1947 with an economics degree and received a law degree from there in 1950. He began practicing law in 1952.

== Political career ==
In 1965, he challenged Jefferson County Judge Marlow Cook for the job, and at one point, appeared at a campaign event with Ted Kennedy. He was defeated by a landslide. He became chair of the Jefferson County Democratic Party chairman in 1968. In 1973, Stansbury became a member of the Louisville Board of Aldermen, becoming its president in 1974.

=== Mayor of Louisville (1977–1982) ===
Stansbury was elected Mayor of Louisville in 1977. Among the accomplishments of his tenure was bringing the Louisville Redbirds, a minor league baseball team, to the city. He also focused heavily on downtown development, including the beginning of construction on the Kentucky Center for the Arts and redeveloping a portion of the River City Mall to become the Louisville Galleria. In November 1978, he signed a then-controversial ordinance that renamed downtown thoroughfare Walnut Street to Muhammad Ali Boulevard in honor of the city's most famous native Muhammad Ali, who had recently become heavyweight champion of the world for the third and final time.

==== Scandals ====
Stansbury became unpopular for being out of town with a woman named Mary Ellen Farmer during a firefighters' strike in 1978. Initially, he had claimed to be in Atlanta for a conference, but later admitted his true whereabouts. The scandal caused him to grow unpopular, and lead to a probe being launched into him. At one point, polling showed that 56% of the people of Louisville wanted him out of office. Not helping matters, Stansbury also appeared before a federal grand jury to testify about alleged campaign finance violations. Also at the time, there was an ongoing Democratic schism at the time. Stansbury had been considered a party favorite, dating back to his 1977 win. But the Louisville Board of Aldermen was increasingly filled with younger and more liberal Democratic politicians, elected post-Watergate. As a result, the schisms weakened Stansbury's position.

Over the next year, his political capital would take further hits. 1979 saw Stansbury accused by gubernatorial candidate Carroll Hubbard for coercing city employees to back Terry McBrayer for Governor. In August, Stansbury divorced from his wife of 33 years Dorothy. In September, the Louisville Board of Aldermen voted 10–2 in favor of a resolution calling for the mayor to resign. Not long after, he was subjected to an impeachment attempt. In response, Stansbury vetoed the measures that would allow the process to go through, calling the process a "vendetta". The process was eventually thwarted by court rulings denying investigators access to Stansbury's records and the ability to subpoena witnesses. Capping off the year, in December, Governor-elect John Y. Brown called for his resignation. In spite of all this, Stansbury refused calls for him to resign. That said, he largely withdrew from the public eye after these events. Barred from running again due to term limits, Stansbury served out the remainder of his term, and was succeeded by his predecessor Harvey Sloane.

=== Post-mayoral career ===
After his tenure in office ended, Stansbury returned to practicing law. He also became a state legislature lobbyist in 1982. In 1983, he married Mary Ellen Farmer, the woman with whom he went out of town in 1978. In 1984, reports circulated that Stansbury would run for mayor again in 1985, though close friends thought it was unlikely. That same year, however, he was appointed by Governor Martha Layne Collins as a hearing officer for the state's Worker's Compensation board.

== Death and legacy ==
Stansbury and his mother, Aileen Stansbury, were hit by a car on April 4, 1985, while crossing the 1900 block of Bardstown Rd. in Louisville on their way to church. Stansbury's leg was severed and he died at 10:21 EST of cardiac arrest that night, with his mother dying only 10 minutes later. Stansbury's second wife Mary Ellen was also injured. Stansbury was interred at Calvary Cemetery on Newburg Road in Louisville.

The 7-acre, Olmsted-designed Triangle Park at the intersection of South 3rd Street and Eastern Parkway (next to University of Louisville's Belknap Campus) was soon thereafter renamed to William B. Stansbury Park in his honor.

Political offices
Preceded by Harvey I. Sloane	Mayor of Louisville, Kentucky; December 1, 1977–January 1, 1982	Succeeded by Harvey I. Sloane
