= Charles P. Weaver =

American politician

Charles Parsons Weaver

30th Mayor of Louisville
- In office 1897–1901
- Preceded by: George Davidson Todd
- Succeeded by: Charles F. Grainger

Personal details
- Born: March 14, 1851 Louisville, Kentucky, U.S.
- Died: November 21, 1932 (aged 81) Louisville, Kentucky, U.S.
- Resting place: Cave Hill Cemetery; Louisville, Kentucky, U.S.
- Party: Democratic Party
- Spouse: Anna Mary Sewell (m. 1886)
- Children: 4
- Education: Bryant and Stratton Commercial College

Charles Parsons Weaver (March 14, 1851 – November 21, 1932) was Mayor of Louisville, Kentucky from 1897 to 1901.

== Life ==
Charles P. Weaver was born in Louisville on March 14, 1851. He attended Bryant and Stratton Commercial College. He married Anna "Annie" Mary Sewell on November 17, 1886, and they had four children together, including William, who served in United States Army during both World Wars and retired as highly decorated major general. He was elected to the Louisville Board of Aldermen in 1888 and served until 1894. He served as secretary and treasurer of the Kentucky & Indiana Bridge Company from 1889 through 1894. He was appointed postmaster by Grover Cleveland in 1894.

He ran for mayor in 1897 against George Davidson Todd in the first Louisville mayoral election where a Democrat ran directly against a Republican. With the support of political boss John Whallen and accusations of voter fraud, Weaver was elected by a margin of 2,700 votes.

As mayor, he secured financing to buy Dupont Square and develop it into Louisville's Central Park, although the plan was not completed until 1904.

He died from pneumonia in Louisville on November 21, 1932, and was buried in Cave Hill Cemetery.
