= 1990 United States Senate election in Kentucky =

- November 6, 1990
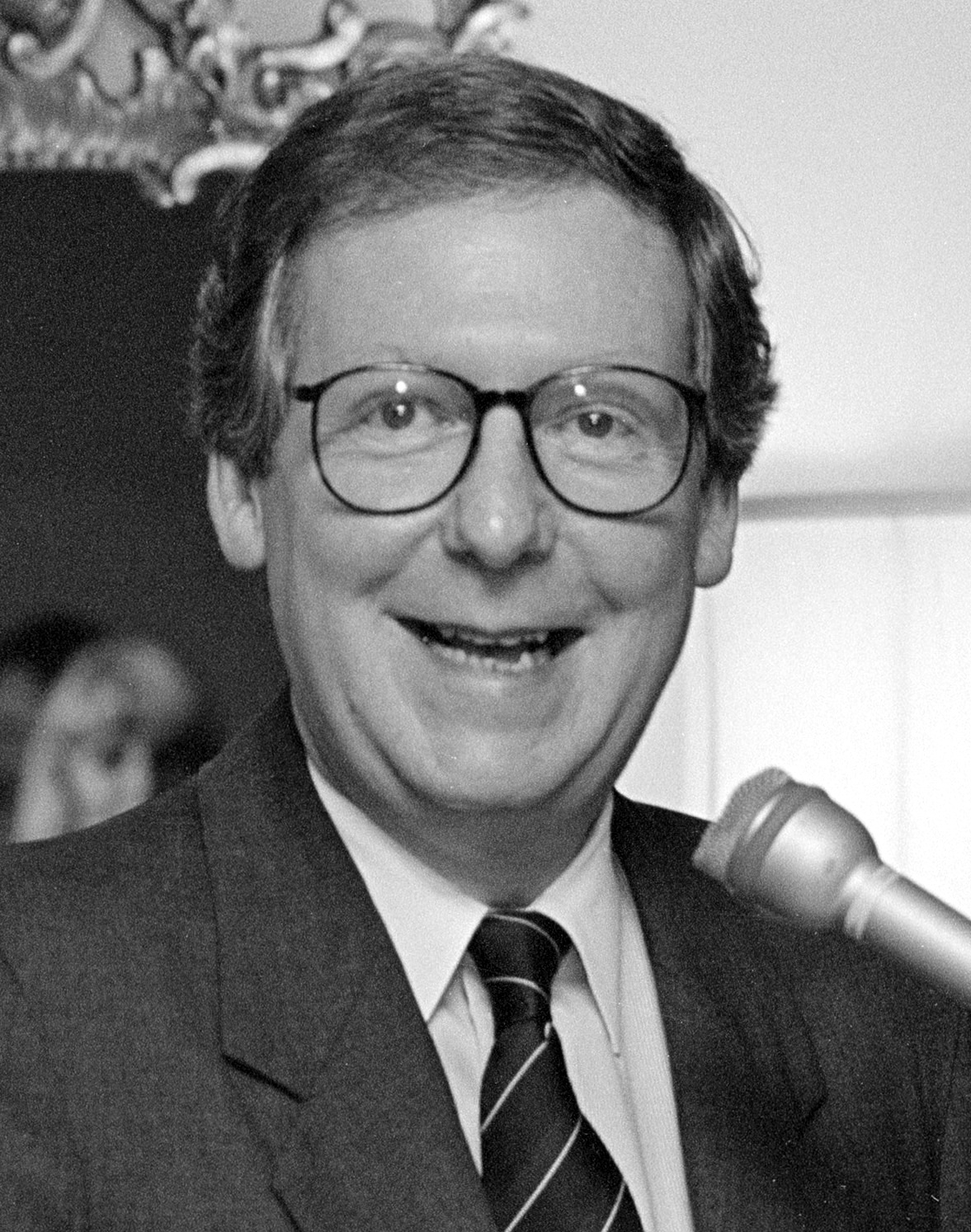

| Nominee | Mitch McConnell | Harvey Sloane |
| Party | Republican | Democratic |
| Popular vote | 478,034 | 437,976 |
| Percentage | 52.19% | 47.81% |
- County results McConnell: 50–60% 60–70% 70–80% 80–90% Sloane: 50–60% 60–70% 70–80%
U.S. senator before election
Mitch McConnell
Republican
Elected U.S. Senator
Mitch McConnell
Republican

The 1990 United States Senate election in Kentucky was held on November 6, 1990. Incumbent Republican U.S. Senator Mitch McConnell won re-election to a second term.

== Republican primary ==
=== Candidates ===
- Mitch McConnell, incumbent U.S. Senator
- Tommy Klein, perennial candidate

=== Results ===
Republican primary results
| Party | Candidate | Votes | % |
|---|---|---|---|
| Republican | Mitch McConnell (incumbent) | 64,063 | 88.52% |
| Republican | Tommy Klein | 8,310 | 11.48% |
| Total votes | | 72,373 | 100.00% |

== Democratic primary ==
=== Candidates ===
- Harvey Sloane, former Mayor of Louisville
- John Brock, Kentucky Superintendent of Public Education

=== Results ===
Democratic primary results
| Party | Candidate | Votes | % |
|---|---|---|---|
| Democratic | Harvey I. Sloane | 183,789 | 59.27% |
| Democratic | John Brock | 126,318 | 40.73% |
| Total votes | | 310,107 | 100.00% |

== General election ==
=== Candidates ===
- Mitch McConnell (R), incumbent U.S. Senator
- Harvey Sloane (D), former Mayor of Louisville, Kentucky

=== Results ===
General election results
| Party | Candidate | Votes | % | ±% |
|---|---|---|---|---|
| Republican | Mitch McConnell (incumbent) | 478,034 | 52.19% | +2.28% |
| Democratic | Harvey I. Sloane | 437,976 | 47.81% | −1.68% |
| Majority | | 40,058 | 4.37% | +3.97% |
| Total votes | | 916,010 | 100.0% | |
| Republican hold | | | | |

== See also ==
- 1990 United States Senate elections
