= Robert Worth Bingham =

American judge and diplomat (1871–1937)

Robert Bingham
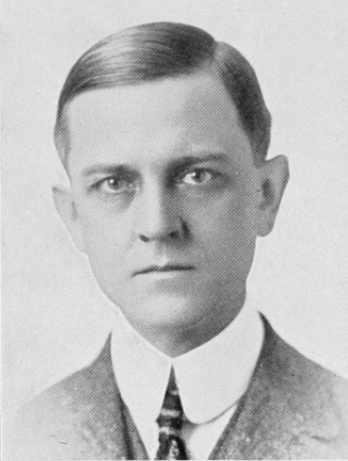

43rd United States Ambassador to the United Kingdom
- In office May 23, 1933 – November 19, 1937
- President: Franklin D. Roosevelt
- Preceded by: Andrew W. Mellon
- Succeeded by: Joseph P. Kennedy

33rd Mayor of Louisville
- In office July 1907 – December 1907
- Preceded by: Paul C. Barth
- Succeeded by: James F. Grinstead

Personal details
- Born: Robert Worth Bingham; November 8, 1871 Orange County, North Carolina, U.S.
- Died: December 18, 1937 (aged 66) Baltimore, Maryland, U.S.
- Resting place: Cave Hill Cemetery
- Party: Democratic (before 1910, 1917–1937); Republican (1910–1917)
- Spouse(s): Eleanor Miller; Mary Flagler; Aleen Lithgow Hilliard
- Children: 3, including Barry
- Education: University of North Carolina, Chapel Hill; University of Virginia; University of Louisville (LLB)

Robert Worth Bingham (November 8, 1871 – December 18, 1937) was an American politician, judge, newspaper publisher and the United States Ambassador to the United Kingdom from 1933 to 1937. (Note: Sources differ as to the date that Bingham's service as Ambassador ended. William E. Ellis, in his biography of Bingham, states that Bingham resigned on December 8, but President Roosevelt took no action, and Bingham died '"still American Ambassador to Great Britain"'. Likewise, Susan Tifft and Alex S. Jones also state that Bingham sent his resignation to President Roosevelt on December 8, but they do not mention whether the President accepted his resignation. On the other hand, Walter E. Campbell, in his biography of William R. Kenan Jr., says that Bingham resigned on December 10, eight days before his death. The New York Times reported, ten days before Bingham's death, that he had "tendered his resignation some weeks ago" due to ill health, but the newspaper's obituary and later coverage still refer to Bingham as Ambassador to the United Kingdom. Perhaps the best arbiter is the State Department, which reports that Bingham's mission terminated on November 19, 1937, with his departure from England. This article uses the date supplied by the State Department, November 19, 1937, as his last day in office.)

== Background ==
Bingham attended the University of North Carolina and University of Virginia but did not graduate. He moved to Louisville in the 1890s and received a law degree from the University of Louisville in 1897. He formed his own practice with W.W. Davies.

Bingham married into a wealthy family in 1896. He became involved in Louisville politics as a registered Democrat, and was appointed interim mayor of the city in 1907 after election fraud invalidated the 1905 election. His corruption-busting tactics in his 6-month term alienated him from the local political machine and the Democratic Party in general, and he chose not to run in the general election.

He ran unsuccessfully for the Kentucky Court of Appeals in 1910 as a Republican, and as a Democrat for Fiscal Court in 1917. He was appointed to the Jefferson Circuit Court in 1911, and was known as "Judge Bingham" for the rest of his life.

== Controversial inheritance ==
Bingham's first wife Eleanor Miller died in 1913. She was a passenger with her children in a car driven by her brother. Accounts vary, but either the car was crossing railroad tracks and was hit by a speeding commuter train or Eleanor jumped out of the car as it crossed the tracks. Her father Samuel Miller had committed suicide in this manner nineteen years earlier. Her son Barry later said he could remember Eleanor pushing him out of her lap and jumping from the car. She was survived by three children: Robert Norwood Bingham (his middle name was later changed to Worth, making him Robert Worth Bingham Jr), George Barry Bingham (better known as Barry Bingham Sr.), and Henrietta Worth Bingham.

In 1916 Bingham married Mary Lily Flagler, reputedly the wealthiest woman in America at the time and widow of Henry Morrison Flagler. She died within a year, and although there was never any evidence of it, Bingham's enemies and some of his relatives would long claim he was somehow to blame for her death. As the family business crumbled publicly in the 1980s, several biographers, most notably David Leon Chandler and Mary Lily's step-granddaughter Sallie Bingham claimed Bingham had killed his wife for the money, either by overdose or withholding medical care. Immediately before falling ill, Mary Lily had added a codicil to her will, giving Bingham five million dollars outright (rather than the investment fund for him she had originally planned). Allegations of murder haunted Bingham for many years. While acknowledging these theories were at least plausible, more mainstream sources, from the Filson Club's respected quarterly publication to The New York Times, dismissed the allegations as impossible to prove beyond a reasonable doubt.

Nevertheless, as Bingham inherited $5 million after her death, enabling him to purchase The Courier-Journal and The Louisville Times, which became critical in establishing his later national prominence, it made an attractive conspiracy theory. Bingham's son, Barry Bingham Sr., argued that Flagler was an alcoholic who drank herself to death, a theory supported by an affidavit from her family doctor given in 1933.

== Later career ==
Using the bequest from Flagler, Bingham purchased the Courier-Journal and Times in 1918. He immediately clashed with long-time editor Henry Watterson, who soon retired. In the 1920s Bingham used the paper to push for farm cooperatives, improve education and support of the rural poor, and to challenge the state's Democratic Party bosses. In the latter endeavor he became an ally of U.S. Sen. J. C. W. Beckham, who had been governor in 1900–07. Bingham himself was, earlier in his career, discouraged from running for mayor due to the likelihood of heavy opposition from the likes of Democratic party boss John Whallen, and had bitterly described the unfairness of machine tactics he witnessed used against other candidates. He was among reform-minded Democrats who successfully backed Republican Augustus E. Willson of Louisville for governor in 1907.

Bingham married his third wife, Aleen Lithgow Hilliard, in 1924.

=== US Ambassador to the United Kingdom ===
A strong financial backer of Franklin D. Roosevelt, Bingham was awarded the ambassadorship to Great Britain in 1933, and took up his post in May. As ambassador, Bingham pushed for stronger ties between the United States and Great Britain, and vocally opposed the rise of fascism and Nazism in the 1930s, a time when Roosevelt would not because of political concerns at home. On 7 November 1933 the Saudi-American Treaty was signed by Bingham on behalf of the United States and Hafiz Wahba on behalf of Saudi Arabia. Bingham was succeeded in the post by Joseph P. Kennedy.

=== Other activities and death ===
He was a member of the Society of the Cincinnati, Society of Colonial Wars and the Sons of the American Revolution.

His daughter Henrietta Bingham was involved with the Bloomsbury Group, having affairs with the painter Dora Carrington and later with the sculptor Stephen Tomlin, who went on to marry Julia Strachey, niece of Lytton Strachey, the love of Carrington's life.

Seriously ill, Bingham sailed back to the United States on November 19, 1937. He died a month later, on December 18, 1937, from Hodgkin's lymphoma, at Johns Hopkins Hospital, where he had been operated on a few days before his death; and was buried in Cave Hill Cemetery.

His family continued to dominate Louisville media for another half-century, mostly through his son, Barry Bingham Sr.

The SS Robert W. Bingham, a cargo ship in service from 1944 to 1959, was named for him.

== See also ==
- St Mary's Church, Wilton

== Notes ==
Political offices
Preceded by Paul C. Barth	Mayor of Louisville; 1907	Succeeded by James F. Grinstead
Diplomatic posts
Preceded by Andrew W. Mellon	U.S. Ambassador to the United Kingdom; 1933–1937	Succeeded by Joseph P. Kennedy
