= Robert Emmet King =

American politician (1848–1921)

28th Mayor of Louisville
- In office January 14, 1896 – January 31, 1896
- Preceded by: Henry S. Tyler
- Succeeded by: George Davidson Todd

Personal details
- Born: 1848; Louisville, Kentucky, U.S.
- Died: November 11, 1921 (aged 72–73); Louisville, Kentucky, U.S.
- Resting place: Cave Hill Cemetery; Louisville, Kentucky, U.S.
- Political party: Republican
- Occupation: Undertaker

Robert Emmet King (1848 – November 11, 1921) was mayor of Louisville, Kentucky for 17 days in 1896. He was an undertaker, and elected to the Board of Aldermen in 1894. He served as president of that body from 1895 to 1897, except during his brief term as mayor. He was appointed the mayor pro tem after Henry S. Tyler died in office. King was thus the first Republican mayor of the city.

He retired to Indiana farm after his public career ended. He was buried in Cave Hill Cemetery.
