= Harvey I. Sloane =

American politician

52nd & 54th Mayor of Louisville
- In office January 4, 1982 – January 6, 1986
- Preceded by: William B. Stansbury
- Succeeded by: Jerry E. Abramson
- In office December 1, 1973 – December 1, 1977
- Preceded by: Frank W. Burke
- Succeeded by: William B. Stansbury

3rd Judge/Executive of Jefferson County
- In office January 6, 1986 – January 1, 1990
- Preceded by: Bremer Ehrler
- Succeeded by: David L. Armstrong

Personal details
- Born: May 11, 1936 (age 90)
- Party: Democratic
- Relations: Melville E. Ingalls (great-grandfather)
- Education: Yale University; Case Western Reserve University
- Occupation: Surgeon; politician

Harvey I. Sloane (born May 11, 1936), a physician and Democrat, served two terms as mayor of Louisville, Kentucky, and also a term as county judge-executive of Jefferson County, Kentucky. He narrowly lost two Democratic primaries for governor of Kentucky and lost a race for the United States Senate to incumbent Mitch McConnell.

== Early life ==
Sloane grew up in an affluent family and graduated from Yale University and from the medical school at Case Western Reserve University. He worked as a surgeon in federal programs for the poor, including in eastern Kentucky and later in South Vietnam during the Vietnam War. Returning to the United States in 1966, Sloane opened a community health center in Louisville's mostly black West End. He also developed Louisville's first emergency ambulance squads and was active in leading local efforts against air pollution.

== Mayor of Louisville ==
In 1973 Sloane ran for mayor of Louisville. He faced Carroll Witten in the Democratic primary; Witten was president of the Board of Aldermen and favored to win, but Sloane upset him, winning in all twelve of Louisville's aldermanic wards. Sloane defeated Republican former police chief C. J. Hyde by a greater than two to one margin in the general election.

Sloane's first term as mayor was from December 1, 1973, to December 1, 1977. Due to state law at the time, Sloane could not run for re-election as mayor. During his first term, Louisville was hit by a tornado during the Super Outbreak on April 3, 1974, and faced a strike by sanitation workers that same year. A federal court ordered busing to desegregate Louisville's schools. Sloane established Louisville's mass transit system, the Transit Authority of River City (TARC), which is still in existence today. Sloane also began Louisville's Emergency Medical Service. Sloane also helped establish the Louisville Galleria project.

In 1981 Sloane ran for a second term as mayor and won, defeating Republican nominee Louie R. Guenthner Jr., a member of the Kentucky House of Representatives, by almost a two to one margin. A change in the law resulted in Sloane's second term beginning January 1, 1982 and ending January 1, 1986.

== Governor bids ==
In 1979 Sloane ran for governor of Kentucky but was narrowly defeated in a crowded Democratic primary by John Y. Brown Jr. who went on to win the office. Sloane won 139,713 votes statewide to finish second; Brown won with 165,188. Terry McBrayer finished third with 131,530 votes, Congressman Carroll Hubbard finished fourth with 68,577 votes, Lieutenant Governor Thelma Stovall was fifth with 47,633 and four minor candidates split another 14,175 votes.

In 1983 Sloane ran for governor of Kentucky a second time, losing by a small margin in the Democratic primary to Lieutenant Governor Martha Layne Collins. Sloane again finished second, winning 219,160 votes to Collins' 223,692; Grady Stumbo finished third with 199,795 and three minor candidates split 15,807 votes.

== Post-mayoral and senate race ==
As Sloane's second term as mayor came to an end, he ran for the office of Jefferson County Judge-Executive and won, serving in that capacity from January 4, 1986, to January 1, 1990. He won the office by defeating Republican nominee George Clark by a two to one margin.

In 1990 Sloane was the Democratic nominee for the United States Senate against incumbent Mitch McConnell. Governor Wallace G. Wilkinson, angry that Sloane had not supported him in the 1987 gubernatorial primary, had John Brock, the state superintendent of public instruction, run against Sloane in the Democratic primary for the Senate seat, exhausting some of Sloane's resources. Wilkinson refused to assist Sloane in the general election and the state Democratic party leadership, following the governor's lead, did little to assist Sloane. Despite these obstacles Sloane held McConnell to 52% of the vote but McConnell was reelected.

The 1990 campaign would be Sloane's last in Kentucky. In 1991, with his term as judge-executive at an end, Sloane left Louisville to work on health care projects in Washington, D.C. In 1995, Sloane became the public health commissioner for the District of Columbia but was later fired by Mayor Marion Barry because Sloane issued a public health advisory to boil water without having notified Barry first.

In 2023, Sloane published Riding The Rails, My Unexpected Adventures In Medicine, City Hall and Public Service.

Political offices
Preceded by Frank W. Burke	Mayor of Louisville, Kentucky; December 1, 1973–December 1, 1977	Succeeded by William B. Stansbury
Preceded by William B. Stansbury	Mayor of Louisville, Kentucky; January 1, 1982–January 1, 1986	Succeeded by Jerry E. Abramson
Legal offices
Preceded by Bremer Ehrler	Jefferson County Judge/Executive (Kentucky); January 4, 1986–January 1, 1990	Succeeded by David L. Armstrong
Party political offices
Preceded by Walter Dee Huddleston	Democratic nominee, United States Senate (Class 2) from Kentucky; 1990	Succeeded by Steve Beshear
