= Arthur Wills =

Arthur Wills may refer to:

- Arthur Wills (musician) (1926-2020), English musician, composer, and professor
- Arthur Walters Wills (1868–1948), English politician, MP for North Dorset
- Howard Arthur Wills, former Australian Chief Defence Scientist (1968–1971)

== See also ==
- Arthur Will (1871–1940), Kentucky carpenter, builder, politician and public official
