= W. A. Cocke =

American politician (1796–1844)

William A. Cocke

3rd Mayor of Louisville
- In office 1836–1837
- Preceded by: John Joyes
- Succeeded by: Frederick A. Kaye

Personal details
- Born: c. 1796
- Died: May 9, 1844 (aged 47–48); Louisville, Kentucky, U.S.

William A. Cocke (c. 1796 – May 9, 1844) was the third mayor of Louisville, Kentucky. His term of office was from 1836 to 1837, as mayors were then elected to one-year terms.

== Life ==
Little is known of his early life. He was elected to the City Council in 1834, and from 1838 to 1843. Previously mayors had been selected by the governor, Cocke was the first to be elected by the City Council. This was problematic, and took three weeks before a conclusive vote was reached.

He ran in another convoluted election in 1841 this time voted on by citizens. He won it initially, but his opponent, James Harrison, successfully called for a new vote, and both were defeated by David L. Beatty.
