= Hilliard Lyons =

American wealth management firm

J.J.B. Hilliard, W.L. Lyons, LLC (d/b/a Hilliard Lyons) is a full-service wealth management firm with offices in Illinois, Indiana, Kentucky, Michigan, Mississippi, Missouri, North Carolina, Ohio, South Carolina, Tennessee, and West Virginia.

It is headquartered in Louisville, Kentucky.

Hilliard Lyons was acquired by Baird in October 2019. It was renamed to Baird Trust effective November 2021 (not to be confused with the Scottish charitable trust which also bears the name Baird Trust).

== History ==
Predecessor firms date to 1854.

In 1965, J.J.B. Hilliard & Son and W.L. Lyons and Company combined to become J.J.B. Hilliard, W.L. Lyons.

From 1998 to 2008, the company was owned by PNC Financial Services. Now the ownership is shared between Hilliard Lyons employees and Houchens Industries, based in Bowling Green, Ky.

Other companies under the Houchens include Stewart-Richey Construction, Inc., Tampico Beverages, Inc., Food Giant, and Hitcents.

== Operations ==
Private Client Group

Hilliard Lyons provides financial guidance to individuals and families. It includes retirement planning, estate planning, financial planning, risk management, and education funding.

=== Investment banking ===
In 2010, the firm acquired middle-market investment banking firm bCatalyst and then started to assist business owners.

=== Lending ===
In 2011, Hilliard Lyons partnered with The Bancorp, Inc. to offer clients borrowing services.

=== Trust ===
Hilliard Lyons Trust Company (HLTC) provides asset management (real estate, oil and gas, personal property etc.) and trust services to Hilliard Lyons clients and works as executor and investment manager.

=== Public finance ===
Hilliard Lyons acts in capacities for states, cities, counties, schools, and other issuers of public debt. In 2010, the company handled some elements of the debt for the $238 million Louisville Downtown Arena, now the Yum! Center. The firm maintains municipal bond trading and underwriting desks in Louisville and Indianapolis.

=== Research ===
Hilliard Lyons research analysts cover about 130 companies. Seven company's equity analysts have held The Wall Street Journal's All-Star/Best on the Street title a combined total of 17 times.

Analysts won the Financial Times StarMine Award five times for stock picks within their industry and the Financial Times ranked two Hilliard Lyons analysts among the nation's top 10 analysts.

== Culture ==
Hilliard Lyons is a ten-time winner of the Best Places to Work in Kentucky designation, a seven-time winner in Indiana, a five-time winner in Ohio, and a past winner in South Carolina.

== Community ==
Hilliard Lyons provides financial support to the Kentucky Opera, Actors Theatre of Louisville, the Fund for the Arts, and Junior Achievement of Kentuckiana.

In 2010, the company was recognized with the Governor's Award in the Arts.
