= Thomas W. Riley =

American politician (died 1872)

12th Mayor of Louisville
- In office May 13, 1858 – April 2, 1859
- Preceded by: William S. Pilcher
- Succeeded by: Thomas H. Crawford

Personal details
- Born: Stafford County, Virginia, U.S.
- Died: December 27, 1872 (aged 67–68) Bullitt County, Kentucky, U.S.
- Party: Know Nothing

Thomas W. Riley (1804? – December 27, 1872) was an American lawyer and politician who served as the twelfth mayor of Louisville, Kentucky from 1858 to 1859. Riley was a prominent lawyer and member of the Whig Party, elected to the Kentucky General Assembly, serving as Speaker of the House from 1849 to 1850.

== Life ==
His law firm moved to Louisville in 1852. He was elected to the city council in 1855 and 1857. His firm dissolved when he was elected Circuit Court judge in 1857. On May 14, 1858, Riley was elected by the council to fill the position of mayor after William S. Pilcher fell too ill to continue on. Pilcher died on August 14 of that year and Riley served until April 2, 1859.

After his term expired, he returned to practicing law from 1865 to 1870. He died in Bullitt County, Kentucky in 1872.

Political offices
| Preceded by William S. Pilcher | Mayor of Louisville, Kentucky; 1858–1859 | Succeeded by Thomas H. Crawford |
