= William R. Vance =

American politician (1806–1885)

7th Mayor of Louisville
- In office 1847–1850
- Preceded by: Frederick A. Kaye
- Succeeded by: John M. Delph

Personal details
- Born: 1806
- Died: 1885 (aged 78–79)
- Party: Whig

William R. Vance (1806–1885) was the seventh mayor of Louisville, Kentucky from 1847 to 1850. He was a Louisville attorney and member of the Whig Party elected to the Kentucky House of Representatives three times and Kentucky Senate once during the 1830s and 1840s. During his administration, he conveyed the tract of land that became Cave Hill Cemetery.

Political offices
Preceded by Frederick A. Kaye	Mayor of Louisville, Kentucky; May 10, 1847–May 13, 1850	Succeeded by John M. Delph
