= John Bucklin =

American mayor

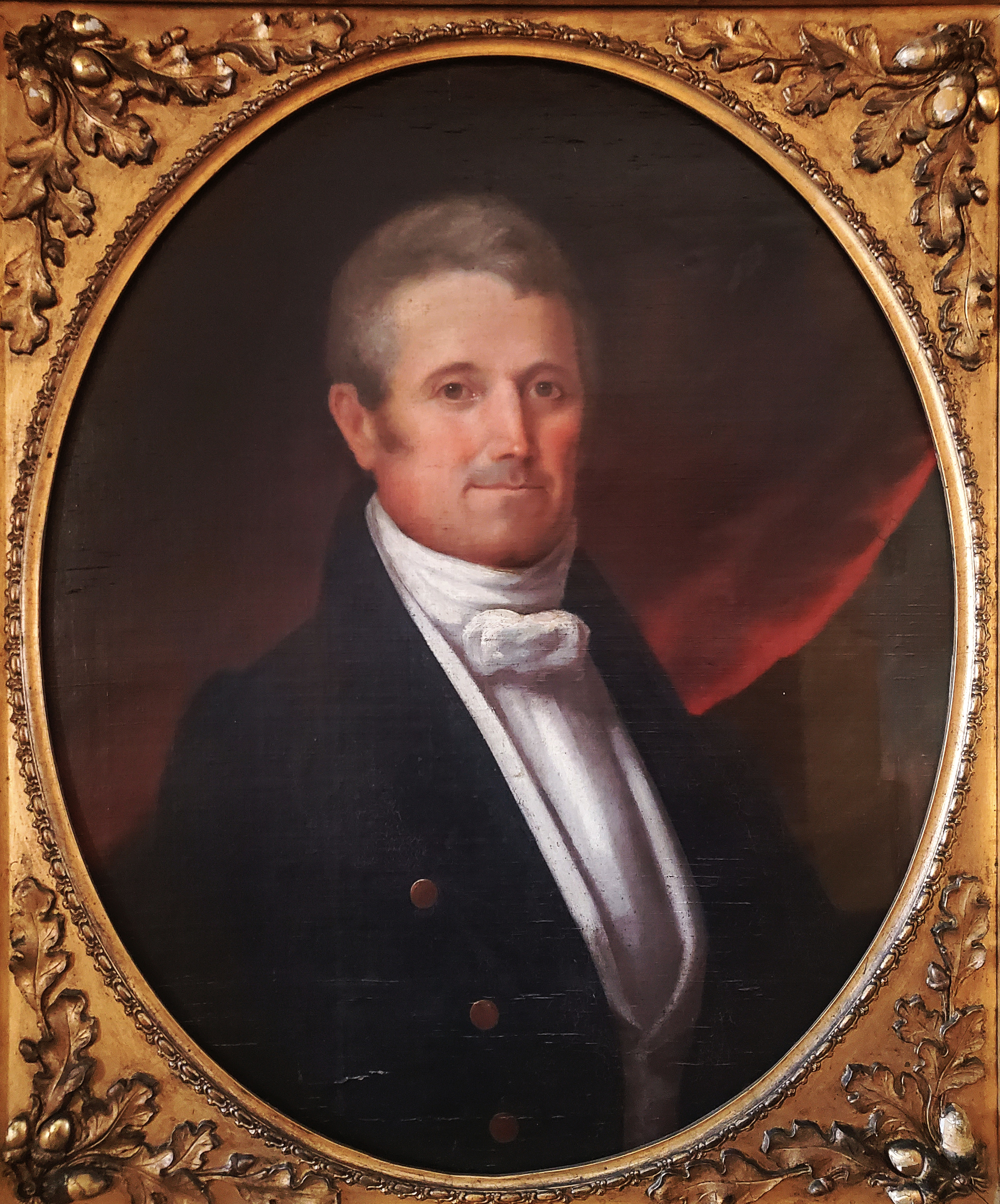

1st Mayor of Louisville
- In office March 3, 1828 – 1834
- Preceded by: Office established
- Succeeded by: John Joyes

Personal details
- Born: John Carpenter Bucklin; 1773 Providence, Rhode Island, U.S.
- Died: March 5, 1844 (aged 70–71) Louisville, Kentucky, U.S.
- Resting place: Cave Hill Cemetery; Louisville, Kentucky, U.S.
- Spouse: Sarah Smith (m. 1803)

John Carpenter Bucklin (1773 – March 5, 1844) was the first mayor of the city of Louisville.

== Life ==
His father, a merchant and sailor, was a captain in the Navy during the Revolutionary War. John Bucklin served in the Rhode Island militia, owned several ships, and married Sarah Smith in 1803. The family moved to Louisville in 1819 or 1820, and in 1823 Bucklin became secretary of the second life insurance company in the state.

He became Louisville's first mayor on March 3, 1828, a month after the state legislature passed Louisville's city charter. Per the terms of the charter, an election was held and the top two candidates were presented to the governor, who chose one to serve a 1-year term. Bucklin defeated William T. Tompkins by just 20 votes, about 650 were cast in total. He would serve six 1-year terms. The powers of the mayor were somewhat limited in the early charter, not even giving the mayor a vote on the more powerful City Council (except to break deadlocks).

During his tenure, he successfully argued for the establishment of the first public school in the city (and state). He also dealt with a devastating flood of the city in February 1832, and pushed for the draining of many of Louisville's early ponds.

He was a Unitarian, and served as mayor from 1828 to 1834. His pastor called him: "so complete a sceptic that he will believe nothing he has not seen or touched. He. . . thinks the sciences of chemistry, geology, anatomy, geology, etc., are all humbug."

He is buried in Cave Hill Cemetery.
