= John G. Baxter =

American politician (1826–1885)

John George Baxter, Jr.
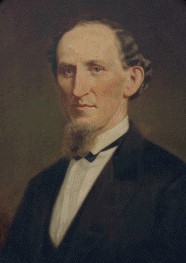
- Portrait of Braxter by George Dury c.1871

20th & 22nd Mayor of Louisville
- In office 1879–1881
- Preceded by: Charles Donald Jacob
- Succeeded by: Charles Donald Jacob
- In office 1870–1872
- Preceded by: Joseph Henry Bunce
- Succeeded by: Charles Donald Jacob

Personal details
- Born: December 12, 1826 Lexington, Kentucky, U.S.
- Died: March 30, 1885 (aged 58) Hot Springs, Arkansas, U.S.
- Resting place: Cave Hill Cemetery; Louisville, Kentucky, U.S.
- Spouse: Alicia Mary McCready (m. 1852)
- Children: 8

John George Baxter Jr. (December 12, 1826 – March 30, 1885) was the twentieth (1870–1872) and twenty-second (1879–1881) mayor of Louisville, Kentucky.

== Early life ==
John George Baxter Jr. was born December 12, 1826, to Elizabeth (née Smith) and John G. Baxter, Scottish immigrants from Dundee, Scotland, in Lexington, Kentucky. His father was a machinist. He attended rural schools and apprenticed with a blacksmith.

== Career ==
Baxter worked as a clerk for six years. He came to Louisville in 1847 and eventually established a successful stove company.

From 1861 to 1863, Baxter was a member of the Board of Councilman. In 1865, he was elected to the Board of Aldermen, and was elected president of the board in 1866. He was a director of the Louisville & Nashville Railroad from 1868 to 1870.

In March 1870, Baxter was elected mayor of Louisville. His first administration saw the construction of the new city hall, as well as a new city hospital and an almshouse. He did not run again in 1872 after his first term because the new city charter restricted incumbents from running. He ran in 1875 and lost by a small margin to Charles Donald Jacob, but was reelected in 1879.

Around 1884, Baxter was elected president of the Louisville Gas Company and served in that role until his death.

== Personal life ==
Baxter married Alicia Mary McCready of Louisville on November 7, 1852. They had eight children: Mary, Elizabeth, Belle, John, Annie, Emma, Carrie and Willie.

Baxter died on March 30, 1885, in Hot Springs, Arkansas. He is buried at Cave Hill Cemetery on Baxter Avenue, which was renamed in his honor.

== See also ==
- List of mayors of Louisville, Kentucky

Political offices
Preceded by Joseph H. Bunce	Mayor of Louisville, Kentucky; 1870–1872	Succeeded by Charles Donald Jacob
Preceded by Charles Donald Jacob	Mayor of Louisville, Kentucky; 1879–1881	Succeeded by P. Booker Reed
