= Grensted =

Grensted may be:

- Rev. Laurence Grensted (1884–1964), British Anglican priest and theologian
- The name of West Grinstead in the Domesday Survey

== See also ==
- Grinstead (disambiguation)
