= William S. Pilcher =

American politician (1803–1858)

William Stanton Pilcher

11th Mayor of Louisville
- In office April 4, 1857 – May 13, 1858
- Preceded by: John Barbee
- Succeeded by: Thomas W. Riley

Personal details
- Born: January 5, 1803; Stafford County, Virginia, U.S.
- Died: August 14, 1858 (aged 55); Louisville, Kentucky, U.S.
- Political party: Know Nothing

William Stanton Pilcher (January 5, 1803 – August 14, 1858) was the eleventh mayor of Louisville, Kentucky, serving from 1857 to 1858.

Pilcher was born in Stafford County, Virginia to a wealthy manufacturing family. He came to Louisville in 1833 to study law.

Pilcher unsuccessfully ran for lieutenant governor in 1844 as a Jacksonian Democrat, but was elected mayor of Louisville on the Know Nothing party on April 4, 1857, in a landslide. However, by May 13, 1858, he was too ill to continue his duties, and he died on August 14, 1858.

Political offices
| Preceded by John Barbee | Mayor of Louisville, Kentucky; 1857–1858 | Succeeded by Thomas W. Riley |
