= Houchens Industries =

American company known for its grocery stores

Houchens Industries, Inc.
- Type: Private
- Industry: Grocery store, insurance, investing/brokerage, masonry products
- Founded: 1917; 109 years ago
- Founder: Ervin Houchens
- Headquarters: Bowling Green, Kentucky, US
- Key people: Dion Houchins (CEO); Brandon Shirley (president); Patrick Coleman (CFO); Jimmy Nichols (COO)
- Number of employees: 15,000+ (2021)
- Website: www.houchens.com

Houchens Industries, Inc. is an American employee-owned company. It is best known for operating more than 325 retail grocery, convenience, and neighborhood market stores across 14 states, through their Houchens Food Group subsidiary. However, it is in other industries, including beverages, investment and masonry products. In 1917, it began as a small grocery store operated by founder Ervin Houchens in rural Barren County, Kentucky. The company is headquartered in Bowling Green, Kentucky. Complemented by a strong foundation of diverse companies and over 15,000 employees corporate-wide, Houchens Industries is listed by Forbes as one of the largest 100% employee-owned companies in the world.

== History ==
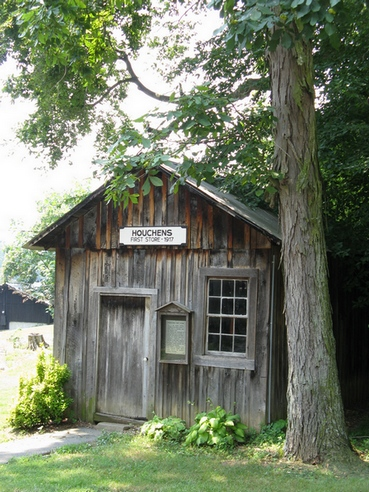
Houchens first store

The company traces its beginnings to 1917, when founder Ervin Houchens at age 19 opened his first store, BG Wholesale, in a shed in Lucas, Kentucky. This shed, along with other historical structures, has been well preserved and is open to the public. He sold the company in 1983. The current CEO, Jimmie Gipson, started with the company in 1965 as an accountant.

In 2004, Houchens acquired Food Giant, which operated mainly in the Southeast. Food Giant had been run by Sikeston businessman Kenneth Storey (1931–2026) who owned many grocery stores with various names such as Piggly Wiggly, Big Star, Sureway, Dixie Dandy, Save-A-Lot, Storey's Marketplace, Storey's Food Giant, and various businesses not related to the grocery business until he sold the stores to his employees in the year 2000. Later that year, Houchens bought Scotty's Contracting & Stone, a large paving contractor, aggregates producer and construction company based in Bowling Green.

In 2007, the company sold its Commonwealth Brands subsidiary, the fourth-largest cigarette producer in the US, to the British company Imperial Tobacco Group PLC for $1.9 billion. It had acquired the company from its founder Brad Kelley in 2001; it was the first time that Houchens had sold one of its acquisitions.

Diversification continued in 2007 when Houchens announced that it would acquire Hilliard Lyons, a full-service stock broker and investment firm based in Louisville, from PNC Financial Services. The sale was completed in March 2008.

Many activities occurred in 2008 for Houchens. In January 2008, Houchens announced that it would acquire 14 convenience stores which sell Shell Oil products from Bowling Green businessman Jerry Browning. The stores are located in Bowling Green and surrounding towns. In April 2008, Buehler Foods of Jasper, Indiana, signed a letter of intent to sell the company to Houchens. That July, Houchens acquired juice maker Tampico Beverages.

In January 2010, White's Fresh Foods, in the Tri-Cities, Tennessee area sold their local grocery chain to Houchens. Those stores currently operate as Price Less Foods.

In January 2020, Jimmie Gipson, after nearly 55 years of service with the company, announced his retirement effective March 31, 2020. The board of directors elected Executive Vice President Dion Houchins to succeed him as the chief executive officer and chairman of the board.

In April 2021, Houchens Industries announced the acquisition of Lee Masonry Product LLC. Lee Masonry Products, Inc. was established by Ray Lee in Frankfort, Kentucky, in 1963 and became a 100% employee-owned company in 2006. Lee Masonry is a manufacturer of concrete block and specialty concrete products and a distributor of clay masonry products for commercial and residential use. Through both acquisition and the addition of new production facilities, Lee Masonry has grown to operate 19 facilities in two states with over 400 employees.

== Other ==
- The company has been completely owned by its employee stock ownership plan (ESOP) since 1988. Employees select members of the board of directors and vote on the sale of any substantial assets.
- Houchens Industries sponsors the annual Kentucky High School Athletic Association's Girls' "Sweet 16" Basketball Championship Tournament. This event was first held at WKU's E.A. Diddle Arena starting in 1985, alternating with other sites. Diddle Arena then hosted the tournament annually from 2001 to 2015. The girls' tournament is now held annually at Rupp Arena in Lexington, alongside the boys' edition of the Sweet 16.
- Houchens also contributes heavily to the community, most notably Western Kentucky University. It acquired naming rights to WKU's football stadium, Houchens Industries–L. T. Smith Stadium.
