= Joseph T. O'Neal =

American politician (1881–1944)

Joseph Thomas O'Neal Jr.
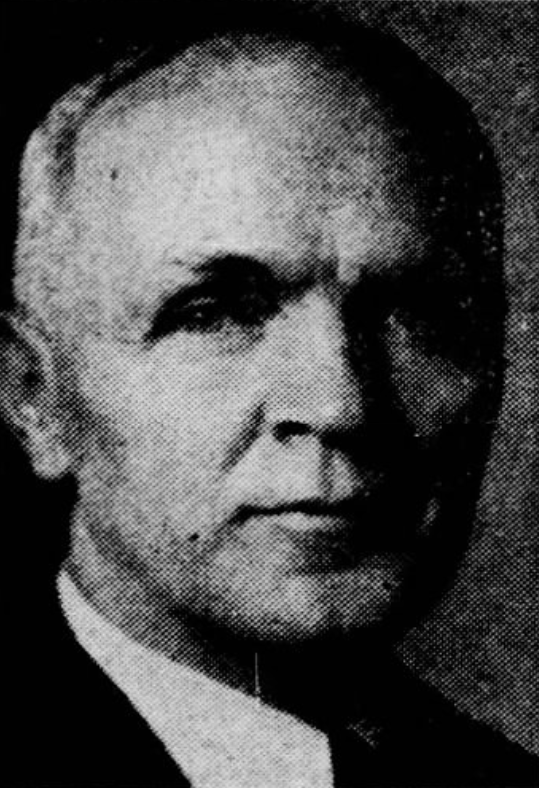
- O'Neal, c. 1944

40th Mayor of Louisville
- In office June 1927 – December 1927
- Appointed by: William Fields
- Preceded by: Arthur A. Will
- Succeeded by: William B. Harrison

Personal details
- Born: August 13, 1881 Louisville, Kentucky U.S.
- Died: September 4, 1944 (aged 63) Louisville, Kentucky, U.S.
- Resting place: Cave Hill Cemetery; Louisville, Kentucky, U.S.
- Party: Democratic Party
- Relations: Emmet O'Neal (brother)
- Education: Centre College; University of Louisville
- Occupation: Attorney; politician

Joseph Thomas O'Neal Jr. (August 13, 1881 – September 4, 1944) was interim mayor of Louisville, Kentucky, from June to December 1927.

== Life ==
O'Neal's father was a respected Louisville lawyer who ran for mayor in 1905, losing in a rampantly fraudulent election to Paul C. Barth. The younger O'Neal graduated from Louisville Male High School, Centre College and then the University of Louisville School of Law in 1903, and practiced law in his father's firm.

In 1925, the Democratic candidate for mayor was William T. Baker. Republican Party boss Chesley Searcy discovered in October that Baker had been a member of the Ku Klux Klan as recently as April 1925. After the Louisville Herald-Post broke the story, O'Neal was appointed the emergency replacement for Baker a week before the election. O'Neal lost narrowly to Republican Arthur A. Will.

Democrats alleged voting fraud had occurred in the election, and in June 1927 the Kentucky Court of Appeals overturned the election. Governor William Fields appointed O'Neal to serve the remainder of the term until a November 7 special election. O'Neal ran in that election against Republican William B. Harrison and lost by a narrow margin. He served briefly as a judge on the Kentucky Court of Appeals following his term as Mayor.

O'Neal died in 1944 and was buried in Cave Hill Cemetery.

== See also ==
- Emmet O'Neal - Brother
