= Philip Tomppert =

American politician (1808–1873)

16th & 18th Mayor of Louisville
- In office 1867–1868
- Preceded by: James S. Lithgow
- Succeeded by: Joseph H. Bunce
- In office April 1, 1865 – December 28, 1865
- Preceded by: William Kaye
- Succeeded by: James S. Lithgow

Personal details
- Born: June 21, 1808 Württemberg, Germany
- Died: October 29, 1873 (aged 65)
- Resting place: Eastern Cemetery; Louisville, Kentucky, U.S.
- Party: Democratic
- Children: 1

Philip Tomppert (June 21, 1808 – October 29, 1873) was the sixteenth and eighteenth Mayor of Louisville, Kentucky in 1865 and 1867 to 1868.

== Early life ==
Philip Tomppert was born on June 21, 1808, in Württemberg, Germany and immigrated to Wheeling, West Virginia in 1831, and moved to Louisville in 1837.

== Career ==
Tomppert was elected to the Kentucky General Assembly in 1849 and the Louisville City Council in 1861, serving until 1864. He was elected mayor April 1, 1865 over Unionist K.P. Thixton. Tomppert was a Democrat who advocated an end to the Civil War and return to the pre-war Union, with slavery intact.

Tomppert's election occurred ten years after Bloody Monday, an election day race riot in Louisville involving Protestant mobs attacking Irish and German Catholic immigrants. The nativist Know-Nothing Party ultimately won the election in 1855 only to have German-born Tomppert elected as mayor one decade later.

A controversy erupted just after Tomppert was sworn in, as it was revealed that a council member, N.S. Glore, had accepted a $5,000 bribe from the president of Louisville & Portland Railroad, Isham Henderson, to approve a street railway along Market Street. Though the council approved it, Tomppert refused to sign the law because of the bribe. As a result, the council impeached him for "neglect of duty" and voted him out by a 10–2 margin on December 28, 1865.

The post was filled by James S. Lithgow until the State Court of Appeals reinstated Tomppert on February 14, 1867, to fill the remainder of the term. Tomppert was subsequently re-elected.

== Personal life ==
Tomppert was a Freemason, holding the position of master. Toppert had one daughter, Barbara, who married German newspaperman George Philip Doern.

Tomppert died of typhoid fever and is buried in Louisville's Eastern Cemetery.

== See also ==
- Louisville in the American Civil War

Political offices
Preceded by William Kaye	Mayor of Louisville; April 1, 1865–December 28, 1865	Succeeded by James S. Lithgow
Preceded by James S. Lithgow	Mayor of Louisville; February 14, 1867–1868	Succeeded by Joseph H. Bunce
