= Joseph H. Bunce =

American politician (1823–1908)

Joseph Henry Bunce

19th Mayor of Louisville
- In office 1869–1870
- Preceded by: Philip Tomppert
- Succeeded by: John George Baxter

Personal details
- Born: December 15, 1823 New York, U.S.
- Died: February 27, 1908 (aged 84) Lyons, Colorado, U.S.
- Party: Democratic
- Spouse(s): Josephine Mullins Henrietta Truitt (m. 1886)
- Children: 4

Joseph Henry Bunce (December 15, 1823 – February 27, 1908) was an American politician who served as the 19th mayor of Louisville, Kentucky, from 1869 to 1870.

== Biography ==
Joseph Henry Bunce was born on December 15, 1823, in New York. He was a steamboat captain until the mid-1860s, when he founded a wholesale grocery firm. Typical of Louisville steamboat captains, he lived with his family in the Portland district.

A Democrat, he ran against future mayor John G. Baxter and police chief Robert Gilchriest in 1869. Despite not being endorsed by the Democratic Party or The Courier-Journal, Bunce won by 300 votes over Baxter.

He was elected to a two-year term, but the city charter was changed in 1870 to allow for a three-year term and Bunce chose to run again for a new term, and was defeated this time by Baxter.

In 1888, he built the first area school near Allenspark, Colorado, which is still known as the Bunce school. He was appointed postmaster of the Bunce station in October 1895. In 1896 he was justice of the peace for Allenspark and Jamestown. Bunce was a significant figure in Allenspark history, homesteading near there in 1897.

Around 1900, he moved to Lyons, Colorado, where he was elected justice of the peace in 1901 and later mayor.

Bunce married Josephine Mullins (1828–1882) and had four children who survived, Mary Alice, Charles William, Harriet Archer, and Marshall Halbert. On January 9, 1886, he married Henrietta Truitt (1831–1925) in Boulder County, Colorado.

He died on February 27, 1908, in Lyons.

Political offices
Preceded by Philip Tomppert	Mayor of Louisville, Kentucky; 1869–March 1870	Succeeded by John G. Baxter
