= Frederick A. Kaye =

American politician (1796–1966)

4th & 6th Mayor of Louisville
- In office 1844–1846
- Preceded by: David L. Beatty
- Succeeded by: William R. Vance
- In office 1837–1840
- Preceded by: W. A. Cocke
- Succeeded by: David L. Beatty

Personal details
- Born: Frederick Augustus Kaye Jr. April 21, 1796 Louisville, Kentucky, U.S.
- Died: October 5, 1866 (aged 70) Breckinridge County, Kentucky, U.S.
- Party: Whig
- Spouse: Rachel C. McLaughlin

Frederick Augustus Kaye Jr. (April 21, 1796 – October 5, 1866) was the fourth and sixth mayor of Louisville, Kentucky. His term of office extended from 1837 to 1840 and 1844 to 1846.

== Life ==
Frederick Augustus Kaye Jr. was born to Mary and Frederick Augustus Kaye Sr. His parents moved from Pennsylvania to Louisville, Kentucky, where Frederick was born, in 1796. They purchased a half acre of land in 1789 and later in that year built what is believed to have been the first brick home in Louisville, on Market street between Fifth and Sixth.

Kaye served on the city council from 1830 to 1832 and took office on March 15, 1837. He was elected by the city council, and was the last mayor to be chosen this way, which was proving to be very controversial and difficult (it took 13 ballots before Kaye was chosen in 1837). In 1838, the state legislature amended the city charter to allow for direct election, and also extended terms from one year to three, but prevented incumbents for running for re-election. Kaye served two non-consecutive terms. He served also president of the Board of Aldermen from 1855 to 1856.

Kaye died on October 5, 1866, in Breckinridge County, Kentucky, at the home of his son. He is buried in Cave Hill Cemetery.

Political offices
Preceded by W. A. Cocke	Mayor of Louisville, Kentucky; 1837–1840	Succeeded by David L. Beatty
Preceded by David L. Beatty	Mayor of Louisville, Kentucky; 1844–1846	Succeeded by William R. Vance
