= George Philip Doern =

American newspaperman ()

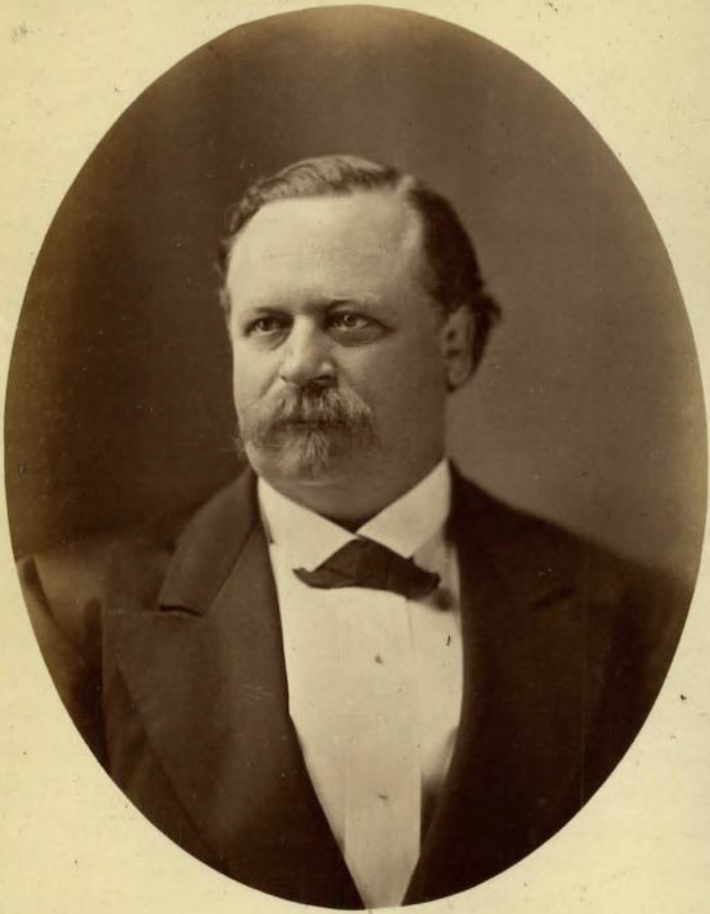
- Born: September 16, 1829; Nauheim, Duchy of Nassau, Germany
- Died: November 12, 1878 (aged 49); Louisville, Kentucky, U.S.
- Resting place: Cave Hill Cemetery; Louisville, Kentucky, U.S.
- Occupation: Newspaperman
- Known for: Publisher of Louisville Anzeiger
- Spouse: Barbara Tomppert (m. 1851)
- Children: 6

George Philip Doern (September 16, 1829 – November 12, 1878) was an American newspaperman known for publishing the German-language newspaper Louisville Anzeiger in Louisville, Kentucky.

== Early life ==
George Philip Doern was born on September 16, 1829, in Nauheim, Duchy of Nassau, Germany to G. W. Doern. His father was a soldier who served under Gebhard Leberecht von Blücher and the Duke of Wellington. In May 1842, at the age of twelve, Doern immigrated with his family to New York and moved to Louisville, Kentucky. He worked for four years under Henry Brutel, the publisher of the Beobachter am Ohio.

== Career ==
Doern worked as a journeyman for one year. On March 1, 1849, he alongside Otto Scheeffer started the Louisville Anzeiger, the first German daily newspaper in Louisville. The publication would attract German immigrants to Louisville. The publication was incorporated in 1877. He remained with the publication until his death. He also published the Louisville Evening News, a precursor to the Louisville Post.

Doern was director of the German Insurance Company, vice president of the German Protestant Orphan Asylum and president of the Louisville Building Association.

== Personal life ==
Doern married Barbara Tomppert, daughter of Mayor Philip Tomppert, on October 2, 1851. They had four daughters and two sons.

Doern died on November 12, 1878, in Louisville. He was buried at Cave Hill Cemetery in Louisville.
