= James S. Lithgow =

American politician (1812–1902)

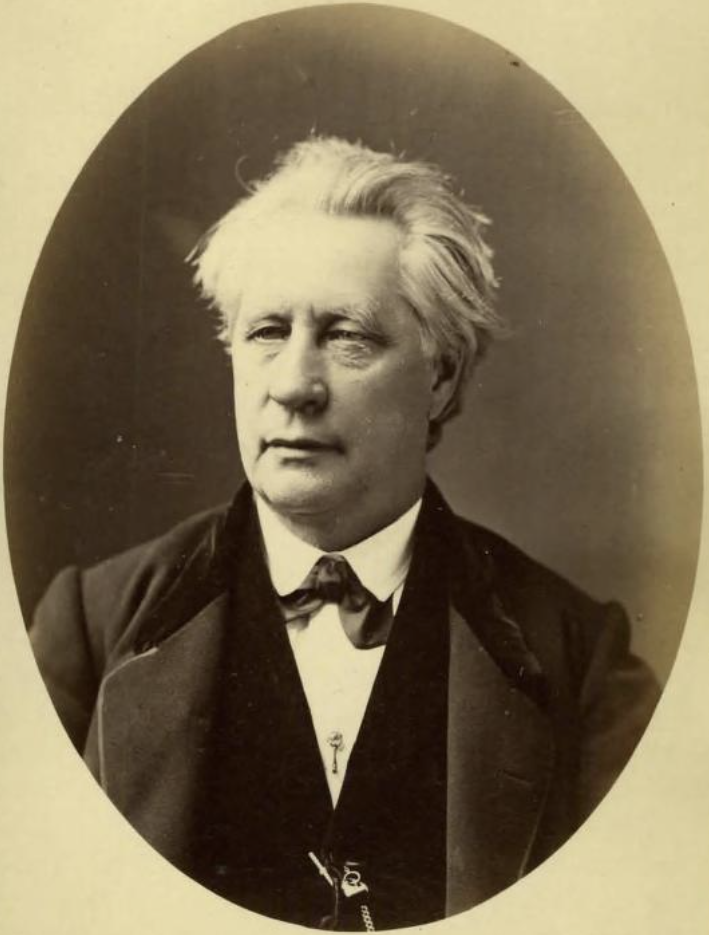

17th Mayor of Louisville
- In office January 2, 1866 – February 14, 1867
- Preceded by: Philip Tomppert
- Succeeded by: Philip Tomppert

Personal details
- Born: James Smith Lithgow; November 29, 1812; Pittsburgh, Pennsylvania, U.S.
- Died: February 21, 1902 (aged 89); Louisville, Kentucky, U.S.
- Resting place: Cave Hill Cemetery; Louisville, Kentucky, U.S.
- Political party: Democratic
- Spouse: Hannah Cragg (m. 1837; died 1891)
- Children: 8
- Occupation: Metalsmith; politician

James Smith Lithgow (November 29, 1812 — February 21, 1902) was an American politician, and the seventeenth Mayor of Louisville, Kentucky, from January 2, 1866, to February 14, 1867.

== Early life ==
James S. Lithgow was born on November 29, 1812, in Pittsburgh, Pennsylvania. His father was a plane maker, and he died before he turned one. He apprenticed as a coppersmith there.

== Career ==
Lithgow moved to Louisville in December 1832. He worked as a coppersmith at Bland & Coleman. He then started Wallace & Lithgow, a metals company on Market Street in October 1836. The business was successful, and made Lithgow wealthy. After the death of Wallace in 1861, the company became J.S. Lithgow and Co. and built its headquarters at what became the Board of Trade Building, initially one of the largest and most expensive buildings in Downtown Louisville. This building was designed by Henry Whitestone, a prominent Louisville architect whose firm exists today as Luckett & Farley, who also still possess the original drawings. Lithgow lost both the building and his business in the Panic of 1873, but he regained his fortune with a new firm, Lithgow Manufacturing Co.

A Democrat, Lithgow was elected to the City Council in 1849, and was a member of the convention to draft a new city charter in 1866. After Philip Tomppert was impeached by the City Council in 1866, that same body elected Lithgow mayor. He resigned when a state appeals court reinstated Tomppert on February 14, 1867.

Lithgow was the chief director and president of the Mechanics' Fire Company in 1834. In 1865, Lithgow was elected as president of the Northern Bank of Kentucky. He also served on the board of directors of the Louisville & Frankfort Railroad and the Elizabethtown & Paducah Railroad

== Personal life ==
He married Hannah Cragg of Louisville, who had immigrated from England, in November 1837. They had eight children. She died on March 28, 1891.

James Smith Lithgow died in Louisville on February 21, 1902, and is buried in Cave Hill Cemetery.

Political offices
Preceded by Philip Tomppert	Mayor of Louisville, Kentucky; January 2, 1866–February 14, 1867	Succeeded by Philip Tomppert
