= John Joyes =

American politician

2nd Mayor of Louisville
- In office 1834–1836
- Preceded by: John Bucklin
- Succeeded by: W. A. Cocke

Personal details
- Born: January 8, 1799 Louisville, Kentucky, U.S.
- Died: May 31, 1877 (aged 78) Louisville, Kentucky, U.S.
- Resting place: Cave Hill Cemetery; Louisville, Kentucky, U.S.
- Occupation: Attorney; politician

John Joyes (January 8, 1799 – May 31, 1877) was the second mayor of Louisville, Kentucky. His term of office extended from 1834 to 1836.

== Life ==
John Joyes was born in Louisville, the son of a pioneer who came to Louisville in 1783 and settled on a lot at the corner of Sixth and Main streets. Joyes studied law and was admitted to the Louisville bar, and elected to the state legislature in 1827.

He was elected mayor on March 4, 1834, and served two 1-year terms. He was the city court judge from 1837 until 1851. He is buried in Cave Hill Cemetery, Section F, Lot 25.
