= Emmet O'Neal (Kentucky politician) =

American politician (1887–1967)

- O'Neal in 1936

United States Ambassador to the Philippines
- In office September 22, 1947 – April 28, 1948
- Preceded by: Paul V. McNutt
- Succeeded by: Myron Melvin Cowen

Member of the U.S. House of Representatives from Kentucky's 3rd district
- In office January 3, 1935 – January 3, 1947
- Preceded by: John William Moore
- Succeeded by: Thruston Ballard Morton

Personal details
- Born: April 14, 1887 Louisville, Kentucky, U.S.
- Died: July 18, 1967 (aged 80) Washington, D.C., U.S.
- Resting place: Cave Hill Cemetery; Louisville, Kentucky, U.S.
- Party: Democratic
- Relations: Joseph T. O'Neal (brother)
- Education: Centre College, Yale University, University of Louisville

Emmet O'Neal (April 14, 1887 – July 18, 1967) was a U.S. Representative from Kentucky and an ambassador to the Philippines. A member of the Centre College Athletic Hall of Fame, his brother was Louisville Mayor Joseph T. O'Neal.

O'Neal was born in Louisville to Joseph T. O'Neal Sr. and Lydia Elizabeth (Wright). O'Neal was the youngest of four children in his family and he graduated from Centre College in Danville, Kentucky in 1907. During his tenure at Centre College, he participated in football, basketball, baseball, and tennis in which he won a championship title. In 1906–07, he led the football, basketball and baseball squad. He kicked one drop kick for 48 yards. O'Neal would be inducted into the Centre College Athletic Hall of Fame in 2006. O'Neal graduated from Yale University in 1908 and from the law department of the University of Louisville in 1910. He was following his father and brothers' footsteps as they were all lawyers.

O'Neal was admitted to the bar in 1910 and started his law practice in Louisville. During World War I, O'Neal served overseas in the United States Army. O'Neal was enlisted in the Fifth Field Artillery in the First Division and as an officer in the One Hundred and Third Field Artillery in the Twenty-sixth Division from 1917 to 1919. Following the war he resumed the practice of law in Louisville and later became involved in banking.

O'Neal went into politics being elected as a Democrat to the Seventy-fourth Congress from Kentucky's 3rd District and to the five succeeding Congresses (January 3, 1935 - January 3, 1947). He was an unsuccessful candidate for reelection in 1946 to the Eightieth Congress losing to Thruston Ballard Morton. The following year, he served as an ambassador to the Philippines from September 22, 1947, to April 28, 1948.

After serving as an ambassador O'Neal resumed the practice of law in Washington, D.C. He became active in the Corregidor-Bataan Memorial Commission and would eventually become a chairman for the commission. O'Neal died in Washington and was interred in Cave Hill Cemetery in Louisville.

== See also ==
- Joseph T. O'Neal

U.S. House of Representatives
| Preceded by John William Moore | Member of the U.S. House of Representatives from Kentucky's 3rd congressional district January 3, 1935 – January 3, 1947 | Succeeded by Thruston Ballard Morton |
Diplomatic posts
| Preceded by Paul V. McNutt | United States Ambassador to the Philippines; September 22, 1947 - April 28, 1948 | Succeeded by Myron Melvin Cowen |
