= Huston Quin =

American politician (1876–1938)

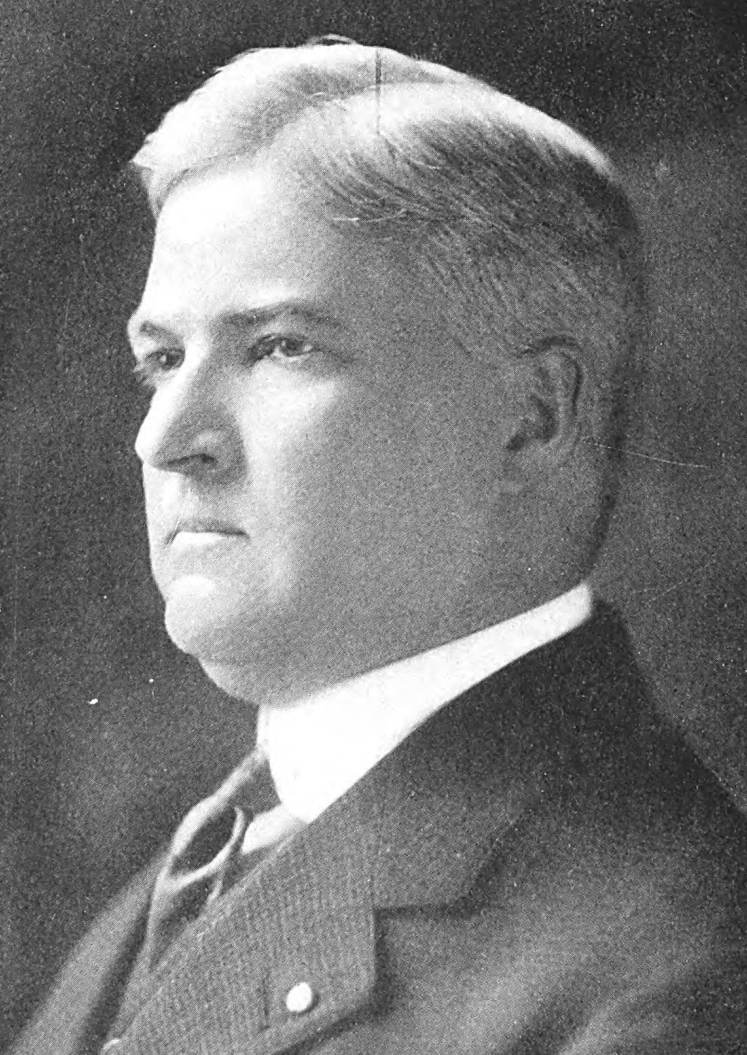
- Quin, c. 1929

38th Mayor of Louisville
- In office November 22, 1921 – November 17, 1925
- Preceded by: George Weissinger Smith
- Succeeded by: Arthur A. Will

Justice of the Kentucky Court of Appeals
- In office January 6, 1919 – November 16, 1921
- Preceded by: Shackelford Miller
- Succeeded by: Charles Harwood Moorman

City Attorney of Louisville
- In office November 22, 1917 – January 1, 1919
- Preceded by: Pendleton Beckley
- Succeeded by: Joseph Lawton

Personal details
- Born: August 4, 1876 Anchorage, Kentucky, U.S.
- Died: August 14, 1938 (aged 62) Louisville, Kentucky, U.S.
- Resting place: Resthaven Memorial Park
- Party: Republican
- Spouse: Martha B. Rivers (m. 1904)
- Education: University of Louisville
- Occupation: Attorney; politician; executive

Huston Quin (August 4, 1876 – August 14, 1938) was an American attorney and politician who served as mayor of Louisville, Kentucky, from 1921 to 1925, and as a justice of the Kentucky Court of Appeals from 1919 to 1921.

== Early life ==
Huston Quin was born on August 4, 1876, in Anchorage, Kentucky. Quin was educated in public schools in Louisville, and received a law degree from the University of Louisville School of Law in 1900.

== Career ==
Quin practiced law with the Louisville firm Helm & Bruce until 1908, when he became a city attorney. Quin was first assistant city attorney from 1909 to 1913. He left the position in 1912 to reenter private practice, but was appointed to the city attorney position in 1917. In 1918 he was elected to the Kentucky Court of Appeals.

He served as a justice of the court until 1921, when he was elected mayor of Louisville on the Republican ticket. As mayor he tried unsuccessfully to arrange funding for what became the Clark Memorial Bridge, and is credited as the mayor to start to push for the eventual Louisville to Jeffersonville, Indiana, bridge.

He was the first mayor to appoint black officers to the Louisville Police Department and fire department, and oversaw the arrival of the first traffic lights to Downtown Louisville. He also helped develop a police call box system, pushed the fire department to become motorized, and organized the Public Utilities Bureau of the city. He helped the transition of the University of Louisville from various buildings around town to the Belknap Campus.

After his term as mayor, he served as president of Title Insurance & Trust Company until his death in 1938.

== Personal life ==
Quin married Martha B. Rivers of Anchorage on June 9, 1904.

Quin died on August 14, 1938, at the Norton Memorial Infirmary in Louisville. He was buried in Resthaven Memorial Park.
