= Thomas H. Crawford =

American politician (1803–1871)

13th Mayor of Louisville
- In office April 2, 1859 – April 4, 1861
- Preceded by: Thomas W. Riley
- Succeeded by: John M. Delph

Personal details
- Born: March 1, 1803; Rockbridge County, Virginia, U.S.
- Died: June 17, 1871 (aged 68)
- Resting place: Cave Hill Cemetery; Louisville, Kentucky, U.S.
- Political party: Know Nothing; Unionist

Thomas Howell Crawford (March 1, 1803 – June 17, 1871) was the thirteenth Mayor of Louisville, Kentucky from April 2, 1859, to April 4, 1861.

== Life ==
Thomas H. Crawford was born in Rockbridge County, Virginia. His mother was the first woman to undergo an ovariectomy, in 1809 in Danville, Kentucky to remove a tumor.

Crawford was elected to the Board of Aldermen in 1857 as a Know Nothing and served as president of the board in 1858, and elected mayor in 1859. He was a strong supporter of the North during the Civil War. He ran for mayor unsuccessfully in 1863 on the Unionist ticket.

After his term expired he worked as a real estate agent and was also president of the Central Savings Bank of Pewee Valley until his death. He was one of the first Kentuckians to install gas lights in his home, and died there as a result of an explosion on May 27, 1871. He is buried in Cave Hill Cemetery.

== See also ==
- Louisville in the American Civil War

Political offices
Preceded by Thomas W. Riley	Mayor of Louisville, Kentucky; 1859–1861	Succeeded by John M. Delph
