= John M. Delph =

American politician (1805–1891)

John Millbank Delph

8th & 14th Mayor of Louisville
- In office April 6, 1861 – April 4, 1863
- Preceded by: Thomas H. Crawford
- Succeeded by: William Kaye
- In office May 13, 1850 – April 26, 1852
- Preceded by: William R. Vance
- Succeeded by: James S. Speed

Personal details
- Born: August 18, 1805; Madison County, Virginia, U.S.
- Died: December 15, 1891 (aged 86); Louisville, Kentucky, U.S.
- Resting place: Cave Hill Cemetery; Louisville, Kentucky, U.S.
- Political party: Whig
- Occupation: Real estate; politician

John Millbank Delph (August 18, 1805 in Madison County, Virginia – December 15, 1891 in Louisville) was the eighth and fourteenth mayor of Louisville, Kentucky. His terms of office extended from May 13, 1850, to April 26, 1852, and April 6, 1861, to April 4, 1863.

== Life ==
He was a carpenter by trade, but entered into real estate in Louisville and became wealthy. He held various public offices in Louisville and Jefferson County, including city tax collector, constable, sheriff and deputy marshall of the chancery court. He was the first mayor to serve under a new city charter that allowed a two-year term for mayors, as opposed to the earlier single-year term.

During his first term, the city experienced a Cholera epidemic, and Delph lead a push for better sanitation in Louisville. Though a member of the Whig Party during his first term, he became a Unionist and staunch supporter of the Union during and after that term.

He served a term in the state legislature after his second term as mayor. He was a founder of Walnut Street Baptist Church.

Delph died on December 15, 1891, in Louisville.

== See also ==
- Louisville in the American Civil War
- List of mayors of Louisville, Kentucky

Political offices
Preceded by William R. Vance	Mayor of Louisville, Kentucky; May 13, 1850–April 26, 1852	Succeeded by James S. Speed
Preceded by Thomas H. Crawford	Mayor of Louisville, Kentucky; April 6, 1861–April 4, 1863	Succeeded by William Kaye
