= Tampico Beverages =

American manufacturer of fruit-flavored drinks and gelatin

Tampico Beverages, Inc.
- Company type: Subsidiary
- Industry: Beverages
- Founded: Chicago, Illinois, US (1989)
- Headquarters: Chicago, Illinois, US
- Area served: Worldwide
- Key people: Jenny Haas, CEO
- Products: Juice beverages, iced tea, gelatin, soft drinks
- Parent: Houchens Industries
- Website: Tampico.com

Tampico Beverages is an American manufacturer of bottled fruit-flavored drinks and gelatin. It is available in the United States and more than 50 countries around the globe. Tampico Beverages is wholly owned by Houchens Industries Inc. since 2008.

== History ==
Founded in 1989, Tampico Beverages began with a single flavor, Citrus Punch. By the early 1990s, they had secured their first international licensee in Mexico. The company continued to add flavors and work with licensees to add new package sizes and formats. Tampico now provides concentrate to licensees in over 50 countries.

In 2018, Tampico launched its logo rebrand for the first time in 11 years.

== Products ==
In 2005, Tampico introduced Tampico Plus, a product that included 50% less sugar than the original product.

As of 2014, Tampico's products were as follows. In the US, these are labeled as a type of soft drink with the word "punch". The words "fruit" or "juice" do not appear because the bulk consists of water, sugar, and flavoring, with only tiny proportions of fruit juice.

Non-carbonated drinks

- Blue Raspberry
- Citrus Punch (original flavor)
- Island Punch
- Kiwi Strawberry Punch
- Lime Punch
- Mango Punch
- Peach Punch
- Pineapple Coconut Punch
- Strawberry Banana Punch
- Tropical Punch

Carbonated drinks

- Apple
- Lemon-Lime
- Orange
- Pineapple
- Tamarind

Iced tea

- Unsweetened
- Sweetened
- Lemon
- Peach

Gelatin

- Citrus Punch
- Kiwi Strawberry Punch
- Tropical Punch
