= William T. Baker =

American residential designer and author

William T. Baker (born December 23, 1956) is an American residential designer and author. He is the founder of William T. Baker & Associates.

== Career and education ==
Baker earned a Bachelor of Science in Finance from Auburn University in 1979 and later obtained a Master of Business Administration (MBA) from Emory University.

He established the firm William T. Baker & Associates.

Baker has written several books on architecture, including New Classicists and Architectural Excellence in a Diverse World Culture. His Great American Homes series showcases his latest architectural works.

== Awards ==
Baker has received multiple awards for his contributions to architecture, including:

- 1993 – Arthur Ross Award for Architecture, New York City
- 1998 – Greater Atlanta Home Builder's Association Professionalism Award

== Books ==
- 2004: New Classicists
- 2008: Architectural Excellence in a Diverse World Culture
- 2011–2017: Great American Homes (Volumes 1–3)

== Professional associations ==
As of 2006 Baker is an active member of the Institute of Classical Architecture & Classical America.

== See also ==
- List of Auburn University people
- Classical architecture
- Classical order
- New Classical architecture
