= List of mayors of Louisville, Kentucky =

Mayor of Louisville, Kentucky
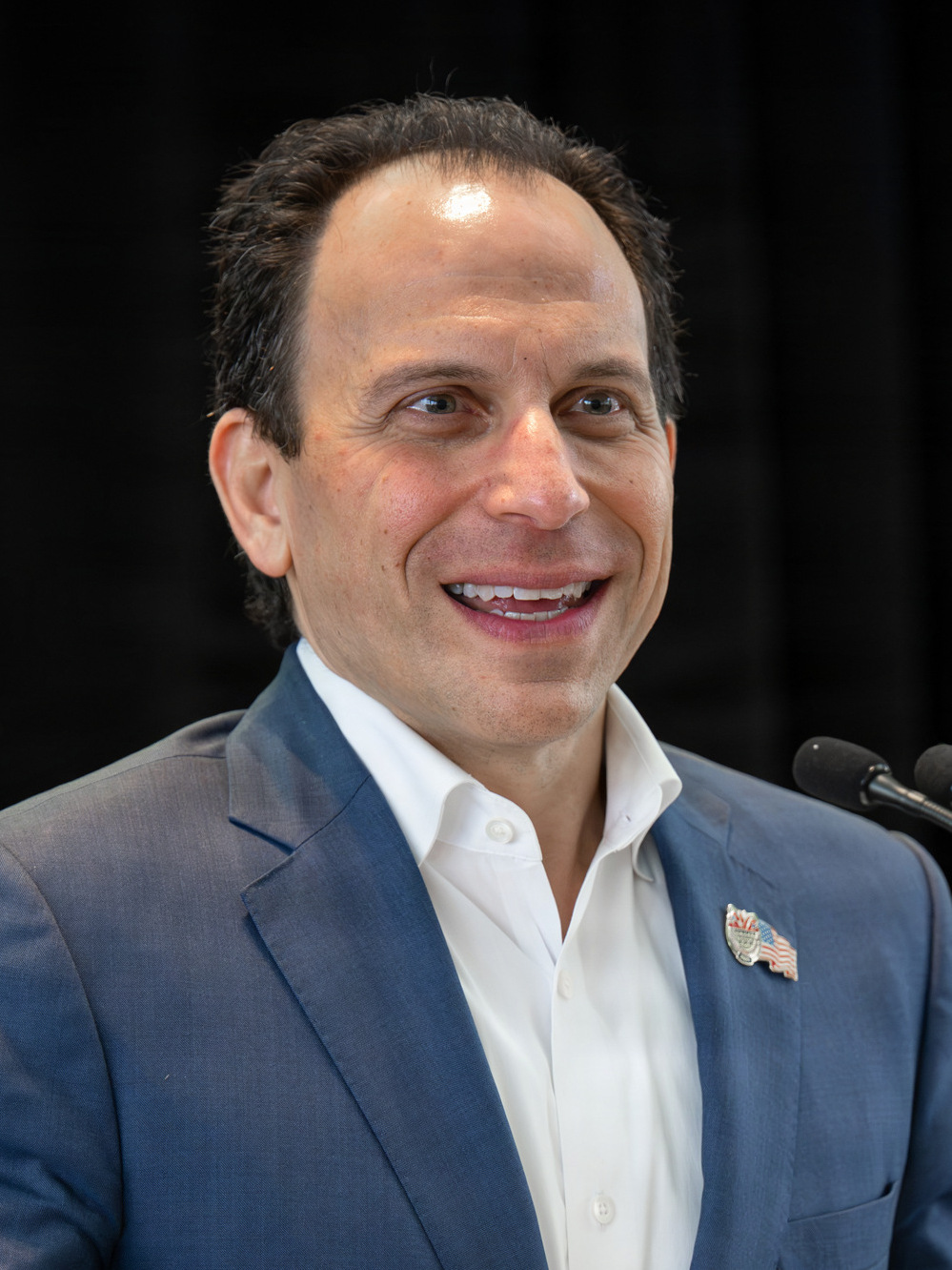
- Incumbent; Craig Greenberg since January 2, 2023
- Term length: 4 years; Renewable twice
- Formation: 1828
- First holder: John Bucklin
- Website: Office of the Mayor

The history of Louisville, Kentucky, United States, as a city is considered to have started on February 13, 1828, the date of the first city charter. From the time of its first organization as a village, on February 7, 1781, until its incorporation as a city, it was governed by a board of trustees. At the time when its growth and commercial importance demanded the change of its government, it was chartered by the state legislature into a city of five wards and placed under the government of a mayor and city council, the latter being composed of ten members, two from each ward.

== History of the office ==
The first election under the Act of Incorporation took place in March 1828. All free white males who had lived in the city for at least six months prior to the election could vote, although mayors were not elected directly initially. The two top vote-getters were referred to the governor, who selected the mayor from the two, with senate approval. The early mayor was relatively weak, acting mostly as a Justice of the Peace, serving a one-year term, and lacking a vote on the City Council except to break ties.

A change to the charter in 1838 allowed for direct election of a mayor, extended the term to three years, and prevented incumbents from running for re-election. The term was reduced to two years from 1851 to 1870, then returned to three, and was finally set at four years by the Kentucky Legislature in 1894. In the early 20th century, corruption and political machines were rampant, causing mayors of both parties to be removed from office by courts. All legislative power was given to the Board of Aldermen in 1929. Mayoral term limits were set at three in 1986.

On January 6, 2003, the city of Louisville and Jefferson County governments merged to form the government of Louisville Metro, and the office of Mayor of Louisville Metro was created.

=== Numbering ===
No official numbering of mayors appears on the Louisville government website. A "Mayor's Gallery" of various officeholders denotes them only by their mayoral terms. However, the same website refers to Craig Greenberg as "the 51st Mayor of Louisville, Kentucky", while his predecessor, Greg Fischer, was referred to as the 50th mayor. A 1986 newspaper report explained that the city archivist saw three possible ways to number the city's mayor:

- Total mayoral administrations (e.g. count the total number of terms served, regardless of who the office holder is)
- Changes in mayoral administrations (e.g. count "tenures when people didn't succeed themselves")
- Number of different office holders (e.g. count the number of different people who have ever served as mayor, regardless of chronology)

The latter two methodologies have appeared in newspaper reporting, typically at the time a new mayor is being inaugurated. At the time that Jerry Abramson was first taking office, the city archivist felt he could be considered the 73rd, 55th, or 48th mayor, respectively, per the above noted methodologies. Greg Fischer being deemed the 50th mayor is consistent with the lattermost methodology.

== Incorporated city ==
Mayor	Image	Term began	Term ended	Political party
John Bucklin		1828	1833	
John Joyes		1834	1836	
W. A. Cocke		1836	1836	Whig
Frederick A. Kaye		1837	1840	Whig
David L. Beatty		1841	1843	Democratic
Frederick A. Kaye		1844	1846	Whig
William R. Vance		1847	1850	Whig
John M. Delph		1850	1852	Whig
James Stephens Speed		1853	1854	Whig
John Barbee		1855	1856	Know Nothing
William S. Pilcher		1857	August 1858	Know Nothing
Thomas W. Riley		August 1858	April 1859	Whig
Thomas H. Crawford		April 1859	1860	Unionist
John M. Delph		1861	1862	Unionist
William Kaye		1863	1865	Democratic
Philip Tomppert		1865	December 28, 1865	Democratic
James S. Lithgow		January 2, 1866	February 14, 1867	Democratic
Philip Tomppert		February 14, 1867	1868	Democratic
Joseph H. Bunce		1869	March 1870	Democratic
John G. Baxter		1870	1872	Democratic
Charles D. Jacob		1873	1878	Democratic
John G. Baxter		1879	1881	Democratic
Charles D. Jacob		1882	1884	Democratic
P. Booker Reed		1885	1887	Democratic
Charles D. Jacob		1888	1890	Democratic
William L. Lyons		May 12, 1890	August 1890	Democratic
Henry S. Tyler		1891	January 14, 1896	Democratic
Robert Emmet King		January 14, 1896	January 31, 1896 (pro tem)	Republican
George Davidson Todd		January 31, 1896	December 1897	Republican
Charles P. Weaver		December 1897	December 1901	Democratic
Charles F. Grainger		December 1901	December 1905	Democratic
Paul C. Barth		December 1905	July 1907	Democratic
Robert Worth Bingham		July 1907	December 1907	Democratic
James F. Grinstead		December 1907	December 1909	Republican
William O. Head		December 1909	December 1913	Democratic
John H. Buschemeyer		December 1913	December 1917	Democratic
George Weissinger Smith		December 1917	December 1921	Republican
Huston Quin		December 1921	December 1925	Republican
Arthur A. Will		December 1925	June 1927	Republican
Joseph T. O'Neal		June 1927	December 1927	Democratic
William B. Harrison		December 1927	December 1933	Republican
Neville Miller		December 1933	December 1937	Democratic
Joseph D. Scholtz		December 1937	December 1941	Democratic
Wilson W. Wyatt		December 1941	December 1945	Democratic
E. Leland Taylor		December 1945	February 16, 1948	Democratic
Charles R. Farnsley		February 16, 1948	December 1953	Democratic
Andrew Broaddus		December 1953	December 1957	Democratic
Bruce Hoblitzell		December 1957	December 1961	Democratic
William Cowger		December 1961	December 1965	Republican
Kenneth A. Schmied		December 1965	December 1969	Republican
Frank W. Burke		December 1969	December 1, 1973	Democratic
Harvey I. Sloane		December 1, 1973	December 1, 1977	Democratic
William B. Stansbury		December 1, 1977	January 1, 1982	Democratic
Harvey I. Sloane		January 1, 1982	January 1, 1986	Democratic
Jerry Abramson		January 1, 1986	January 1, 1999	Democratic
David L. Armstrong		January 1, 1999	January 5, 2003	Democratic

== Louisville Metro ==
Mayor	Image	Term began	Term ended	Political party
Jerry Abramson		January 6, 2003	January 2, 2011	Democratic
Greg Fischer		January 3, 2011	January 1, 2023	Democratic
Craig Greenberg		January 2, 2023	Present	Democratic

== See also ==
- Louisville Metro Council
- Government of Louisville, Kentucky
- History of Louisville, Kentucky
- Timeline of Louisville, Kentucky
