= Henry S. Tyler =

American politician (1851–1896)

27th Mayor of Louisville
- In office 1891-1896
- Preceded by: William L. Lyons
- Succeeded by: Robert Emmet King

Personal details
- Born: September 20, 1851 Louisville, Kentucky, U.S.
- Died: January 14, 1896 (aged 44) Louisville, Kentucky, U.S.
- Resting place: Cave Hill Cemetery; Louisville, Kentucky, U.S.
- Party: Democratic Party

Henry S. Tyler (September 20, 1851 - January 14, 1896) was Mayor of Louisville, Kentucky from 1891 to 1896.

== Life ==
His grandfather, Levi Tyler, was a founding father of Louisville and successful businessman. His family continued to be wealthy and owned, among other properties, Louisville's Tyler Block. Henry Tyler attended Schatlock Hall Military Academy in Minnesota. He returned to Louisville to work as a clerk and bookkeeper and eventually established his own insurance company.

=== Political career ===
He was elected to Louisville's Common Council as a Democrat and then Mayor in 1891. He was re-elected in 1893 under a new city charter, which made him the first mayor elected to a four-year term. Tyler had been instrumental in drafting the new charter.

On December 26, 1893, an aggrieved man named Phil J. Schwarz had walked into Tyler's office. After speaking briefly to the mayor, he removed a revolver that he had previously concealed, and attempted to assassinate the mayor. Tyler, however, managed to successfully disarm him and subdue him with the aid of others. Schwarz was upset about his father's death seven years prior, disagreeing with the official determination that it had been a suicide. The aspiring assassin was derided as a "crank" and "lunatic".

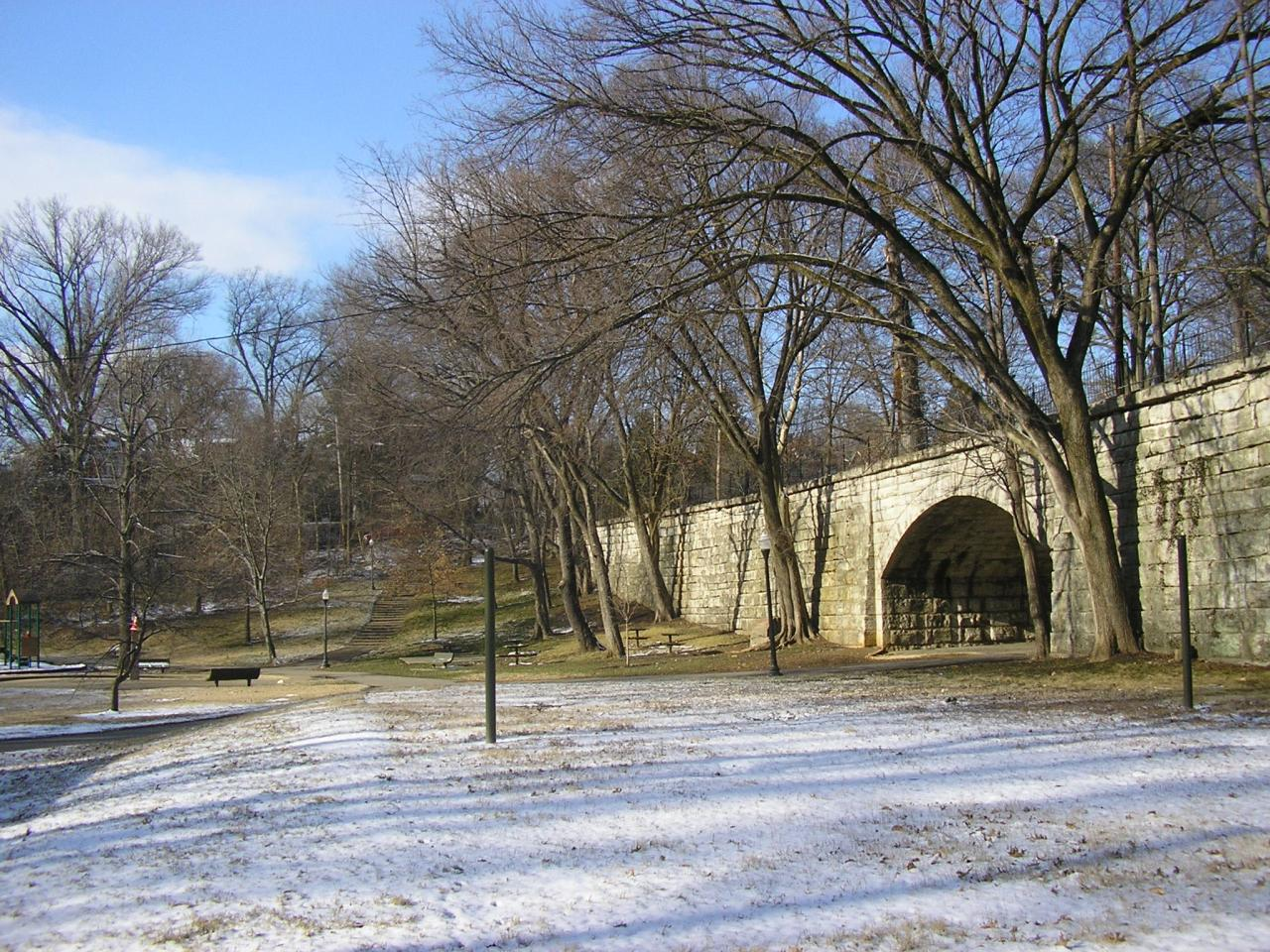
Tyler Park in Louisville

He died in office in 1896 and was buried in Cave Hill Cemetery. Louisville's Tyler Park and the surrounding neighborhood were named for him.
