= James F. Grinstead =

American politician (1845–1921)

James Fontleroy Grinstead

34th Mayor of Louisville
- In office 1907–1909
- Preceded by: Robert Worth Bingham
- Succeeded by: William O. Head

Personal details
- Born: November 15, 1845 Glasgow, Kentucky, U.S.
- Died: November 13, 1921 (aged 75) Louisville, Kentucky, U.S.
- Resting place: Cave Hill Cemetery; Louisville, Kentucky, U.S.
- Party: Republican
- Spouse: Annie W. Harwood (m. 1892)
- Occupation: Grocery wholesaler

James Fontleroy Grinstead (November 15, 1845 – November 13, 1921) was a businessman, mayor of Louisville, Kentucky from 1907 to 1909, and county commissioner from 1917 to his death in 1921. He is a descendant of William & Elizabeth Key Grinstead

== Business ==
Born in Glasgow, Kentucky in 1854, Grinstead had a common school education in Barren County, Kentucky before moving to Louisville in 1866 to work in wholesale grocery at Glazebrook & Grinstead, later known as W. E. Grinstead & Co. He was a full partner in 1871 and worked in the company until 1891, when he left to found the wholesale company Grinstead & Tinsley in 1892, In the same year, he married Annie W. Harwood. which he headed until his retirement in 1910.

== Public service ==
Grinstead became a well-known local businessman and was approached to run for Mayor of Louisville in 1897, which he declined. In 1901, he ran for mayor and won the Republican nomination. After learning that his backer—Republican Party boss Charles Sapp—had used some questionable tactics to get votes for Grinstead, he declined the nomination, earning the nickname "Honest Jim". He became the first Republican mayor of Louisville to be elected by general voters when he became mayor in 1907 to complete the term started by Paul C. Barth, whose 1905 election had been thrown out by the Kentucky Court of Appeals. He ran for reelection in 1909, losing to Democrat William O. Head. Grinstead was elected county commissioner in 1917 and served until his death in 1921.

== Legacy ==
Grinstead Drive, a prominent street running through Louisville, was renamed in Grinstead's honor. He was buried in Cave Hill Cemetery, which Grinstead Drive runs alongside.
