= Jesse Edward Grinstead =

American politician (1866–1948)

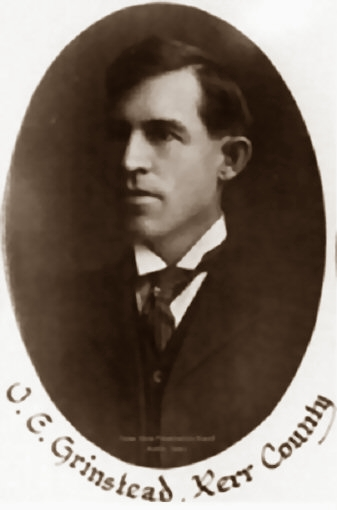

Member of the Texas House of Representatives from the 99th district
- In office 1907–1908

Personal details
- Born: October 16, 1866 Owensboro, Kentucky, US
- Died: March 8, 1948 (aged 81) Kerrville, Texas, US
- Occupation: Writer; publisher; politician

Jesse Edward Grinstead (October 16, 1866 – March 8, 1948) was an American publisher, editor, poet and politician who in later life became a popular writer of Western fiction. Over his writing career Grinstead penned some 30 novels along with scores of short stories and articles that appeared in magazines and newspapers. At least two of his stories, The Scourge of the Little C (as Tumbling River) and Sunset of Power, became Hollywood films. Volumes of Grinstead's works were also published in Britain, Sweden and Spain.

== Kentucky, Missouri and Indian territory ==
J. E. Grinstead was born at Owensboro, Kentucky, the son of William Travis Grinstead and Elizabeth Miranda Priest. According to his brother, author Hugh Fox Grinstead, as a young man their father had served as a guard under Lt. John James Abert during a U.S. Army Corps of Topographical Engineers survey of the American Southwest, had made nine crossings of the Great Plains as a wagon-master on trips to New Mexico and California, prospected for gold in the Sacramento Valley, trekked on foot from San Juan del Sur to Lake Nicaragua, transported supplies during the Utah War to General Albert S. Johnston's headquarters at Salt Lake City and conveyed the first threshing machine to Fort Bridger, Wyoming Territory. By 1860 Grinstead's parents were married and living on a farm in or near Long Prairie in Mississippi County, Missouri. After the outbreak of the American Civil War Grinstead's family returned to Owensboro for the duration of the war.

By 1868 Grinstead's family had returned to Missouri to a farm in Pettis County, not far from where his grandfather, Jesse Grinstead, had farmed since before the 1840s. In 1884 the family left Missouri to settle in Indian Territory near the town of Oakland where William Grinstead would serve as their first postmaster. A few years later, when Grinstead's family relocated to Whitesboro, Texas, he chose to remain behind. He supported himself by working a variety of odd jobs before finding full-time employment as a printer with The Ardmore Weekly Courier. In 1893 Grinstead founded The Oakland 'Indian Territory' News, the town's first paper. Six years later he moved to Kerrville, Texas in the vain hope that the climate there would help alleviate his wife's lung ailment.

== Texas ==
Within a year or so he purchased The Kerrville News and, inspired by the area's surrounding beauty, renamed it The Kerrville Mountain Sun. In 1903 he was elected mayor of Kerrville and in 1906 their representative (House District 99) in the 30th state legislature. While serving in the Texas House of Representatives he was instrumental in pushing through legislation that led to the creation of the State Tubercular Sanatorium in Carlsbad. In July 1908 Grinstead failed to win Democratic support for a second term and was replaced by Sam O'Bryant who prevailed against his Republican opponent that November. Grinstead also served on the Kerrville school board for many years.

== Later years ==
Grinstead sold his interest in the Mountain Sun in 1917 to Terrell Publishing to devote his time to writing and other interests. He became a frequent contributor of Western fiction, sometimes under the pseudonyms, Tex Janis, William Crump Rush or George Bowles, to such pulp publications as Big-Book Western Magazine, Thrilling Ranch Stories, Western Romances, Argosy Magazine and Frontier Magazine. Grinstead published some 30 novels over his career along with numerous short stories and articles. Beginning in January 1921 through December 1925 Grinstead wrote and published Grinstead's Graphic, a monthly magazine of poetry and local interest stories tasked with promoting the Hill Country during a period of hard times.

The 1927 silent film Tumbling River starring Tom Mix was based on his novel, The Scourge of the Little C, and his story, Sunset of Power, was adapted for film in 1936 with Buck Jones in the lead role.

In December 1899 Grinstead's first wife, Sarah Frances, died at the age of 27 at Kerrville. The couple had three boys, Edward Everett (1892–1893), Grady Hugh (1894–1974) and Eugene Doyle (1897–1951). In 1900 he married Gertrude Wright (1868–1946), a widow who operated a boarding house in Kerrville. Three children, Jesse H. (1901–1942), Bessie G. (1903–1958), and Pam (1905–1974), soon followed. By the time of her death in 1940, Grinstead's mother had been considered, at 107, the oldest living person in Missouri.

Jesse Grinstead died at the age of 81 on March 8, 1948, at Kerrville and was interred at Oakwood Cemetery, Whitesboro. At the time Grinstead had reportedly left behind some 100 unpublished works, three of which he had recently submitted for publication.

== Selected bibliography ==
- Kerrville and Kerr County, Texas (1905)
- Fishin' On The Guadalupe (1908)
- An Orphan of the Alamo (1916)
- The Roads of Kerr County (1923)
- The Hill Country (1923)
- The Scourge of the Little C (1926)
- The Stuff Rangers are Made Of (1927)
- Black Kettle Mountains (1927)
- The Master Squatter (1927)
- The Sage of Silver Bend (1929)
- Trailing Old Tarantula (1930)
- Oklahoma Stampede (1937)
- Flaming Guns (1938)
- The Texas Feud (1938)
- The Texas Trail (1938)
- The Red Scalp (1938)
- King of the Rangeland (1939)
- Feud at Silver Bend (1939)
- War above the Timberline (1939)
- The Cattle Barons (1940)
- Guardians of the Range (1940)
- The Great Red Border (1940)
- Law of the Trail (1940)
- The Flying Y Brand (1940)
- Hell Range in Texas (1940)
- Round-Up at Tiger Gap (1940)
- Little River Valley (1941)
- The Killers of Green's Cove (1941)
- War on the Range (1941)
- Hell's Acres (1941)
- Texas Ranger Justice (1941)
- The Lightning Kid (1941)
- Feud at Twin Mountain (1942)
- Hellfire Range (1942)
- Hot Lead (1943)
- King of Hualpi Valley (1949)
- Range King (1950)
- When Texans Ride (1962)
- Phantom Rustlers (1968)
- Raging Guns (1968)
- Maverick Guns (1968)
