= David L. Beatty =

American politician

5th Mayor of Louisville
- In office 1841-1844
- Preceded by: Frederick A. Kaye
- Succeeded by: Frederick A. Kaye

Personal details
- Born: December 3, 1798 Bourbon County, Kentucky, U.S.
- Died: February 21, 1881 (aged 82) Louisville, Kentucky, U.S.
- Resting place: Cave Hill Cemetery
- Occupation: Businessman; politician

David L. Beatty (December 3, 1798 – February 21, 1881) was the fifth mayor of Louisville, Kentucky serving from 1841 to 1844. He was born to early settlers in Bourbon County, Kentucky and raised by his grandparents in Jefferson County, Kentucky. At 17 he moved to Louisville to work as a machinist, and was an iron foundry foreman 3 years later. He founded a steam-engine business in 1829, which dissolved in 1837.

He served on the city council from 1839 to 1840 and elected mayor in 1841. Highlights of his administration included the establishment of the State Institute for the Blind in Louisville and construction of a waterworks. He is buried in Cave Hill Cemetery.

Political offices
Preceded by Frederick A. Kaye	Mayor of Louisville, Kentucky; May 17, 1841–May 10, 1844	Succeeded by Frederick A. Kaye
