= St. Louis Cemetery (Louisville) =

Cemetery in Louisville, Kentucky

Saint Louis Cemetery
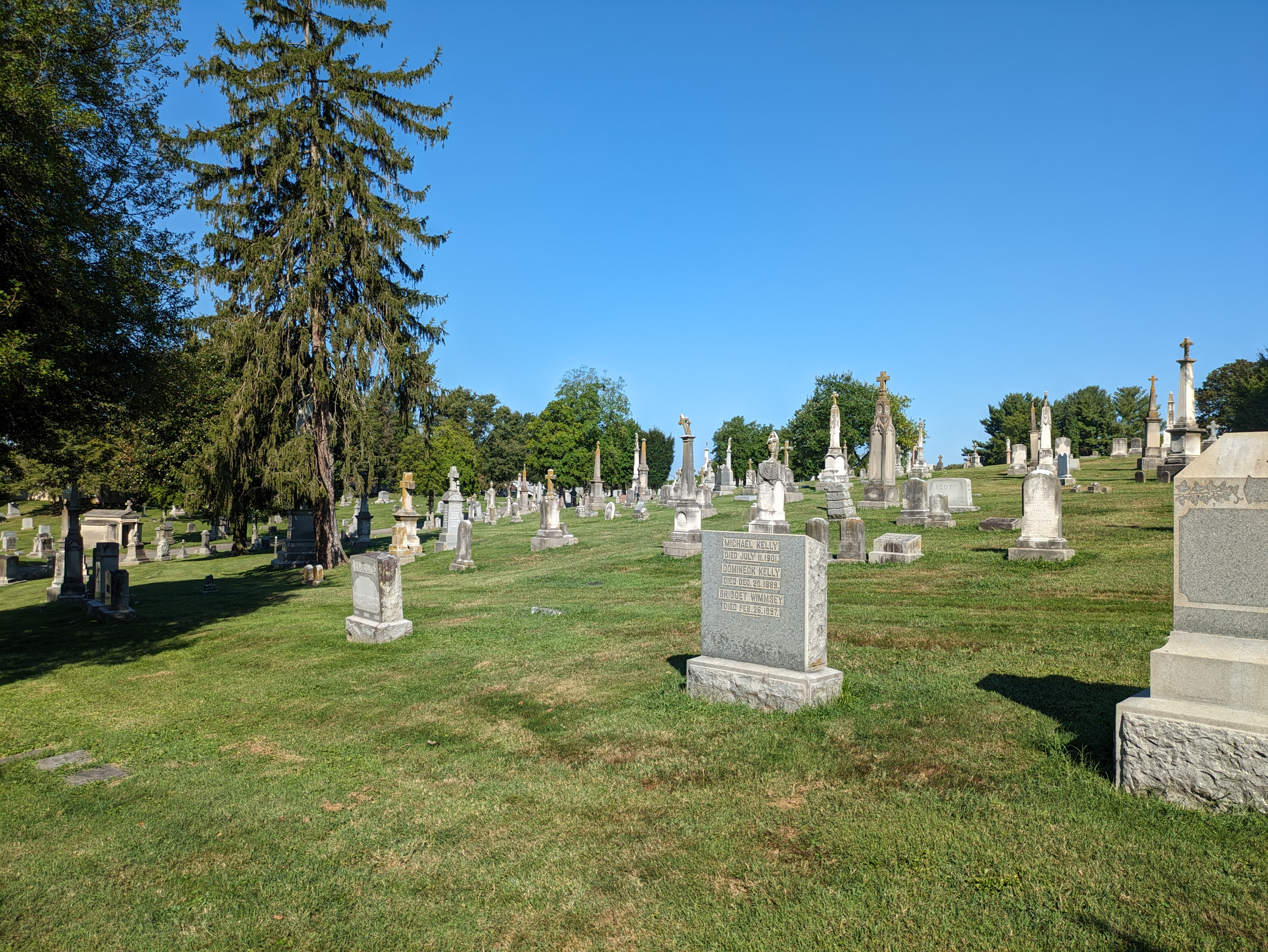

Details
- Established: 1867
- Location: Louisville, Kentucky
- Country: United States
- Coordinates: 38.234°N 85.723°W
- Size: 43 acres (17 ha)
- No. of graves: 48,000
- Website: Saint Louis Cemetery
- Find a Grave: Saint Louis Cemetery

Saint Louis Cemetery is a Catholic cemetery on Barret Avenue in Louisville, Kentucky.

== History ==
The Saint Louis Cemetery performed its first services in 1811 behind the Saint Louis Church at 10th and Main Street in Louisville, Kentucky. In 1831, the Saint Louis Church and the gravesites were moved to the Catholic section of the Western Cemetery. The graves were moved again in 1867 when the Saint Louis Cemetery was established. It was incorporated on May 28, 1972. It was laid out by local designer Benjamin Grove.

== Notable burials ==
As of 2016, there are 48,000 people buried at Saint Louis Cemetery.

- Alma Kellner – 9-year old victim of convicted murderer Hans Schmidt

== See also ==
- List of cemeteries in Kentucky
