= John Henry Whallen =

American theater manager & politician (1850–1913)

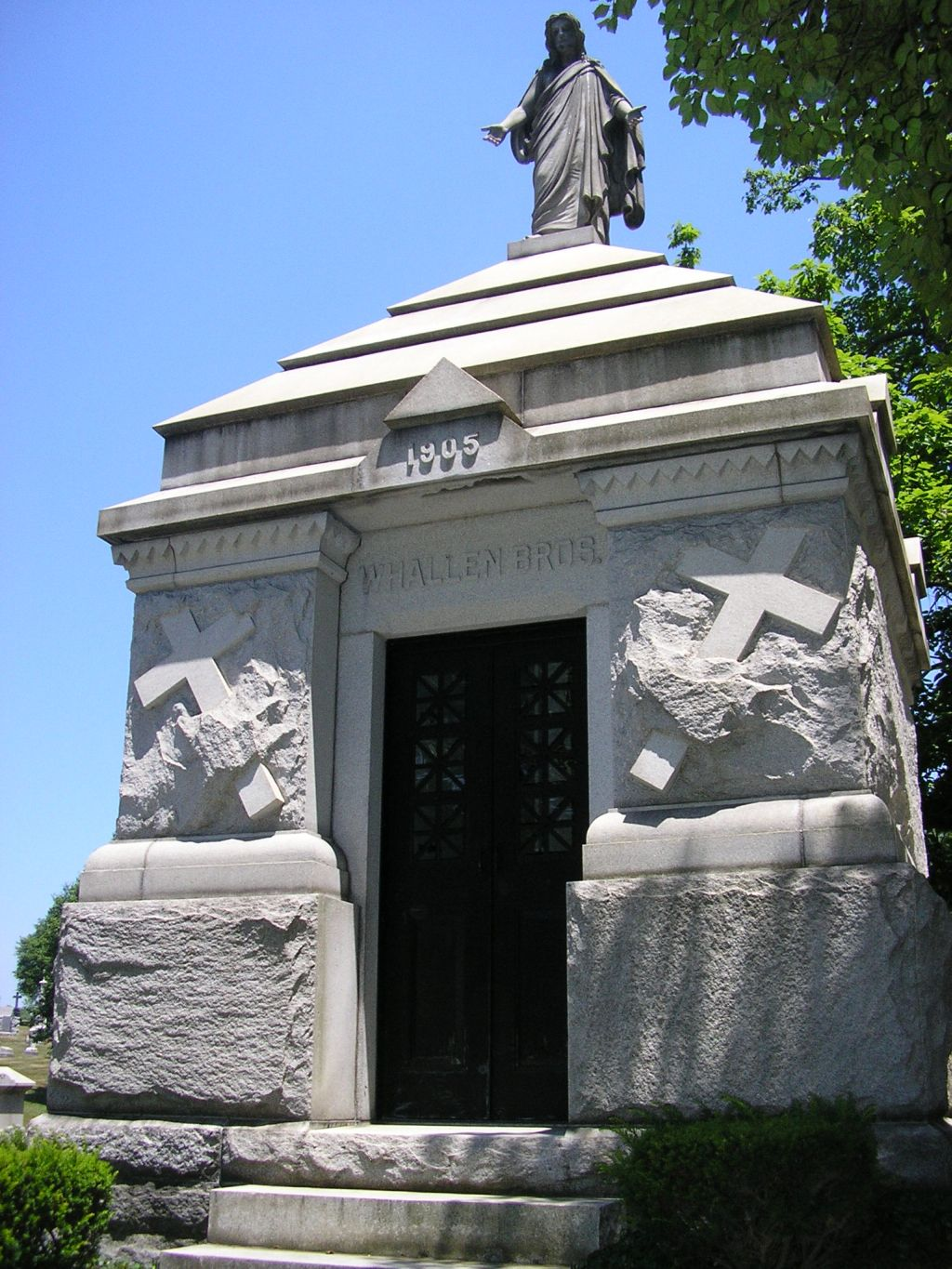
- Burial place of John Henry Whallen
- Born: May 1, 1850; New Orleans, Louisiana, U.S.
- Died: December 3, 1913 (aged 63); Louisville, Kentucky, U.S.
- Resting place: St. Louis Cemetery; Louisville, Kentucky, U.S.
- Occupation: Theater manager
- Political party: Democratic Party

John Henry Whallen (May 1, 1850 – December 3, 1913) was a Democratic Party political boss in Louisville, Kentucky during the late 19th and early 20th centuries. Born in New Orleans, he moved with his family to Cincinnati, Ohio in his youth. As a boy during the Civil War he served the Confederate Army in Schoolfield's Battery as a "powder monkey", a boy who carried gunpowder. He later served as a courier for General John Hunt Morgan.

His nicknames included "The Buckingham Boss" and "Napoleon".

== Theater owner ==
Whallen moved to Louisville in the 1870s and became the manager of a vaudeville theater, The Metropolitan. He opened the Buckingham Theater in 1880, a Burlesque, on Jefferson between Third and Fourth Street. Although he tried a few legitimate theater ventures, his wealth came from more prurient interests, and he never had a respectable reputation in Louisville. He came to own several theatres in other cities, including two in Brooklyn, and produced the lavish show, The South Before the War, one of the most successful shows of its era.

== Political boss ==
It became necessary for Whallen to establish political ties in order to protect his business interests from the family and religious groups that periodically protested Burlesque and its ties to prostitution and gambling. In 1885 he engineered the election of mayor P. Booker Reed and was rewarded with the position Chief of Police. From that point on he was known as the "Buckingham Boss" (after the theater where he had his office) and influenced every Louisville and statewide Kentucky election for the rest of his life. In addition to bribing officials and controlling assistance programs, at his peak Whallen controlled the awarding of 1,200 city patronage jobs.

For many years, Whallen virtually ran Louisville from his "Green Room" at the Buckingham. Pulitzer Prize–winning journalist Arthur Krock recalled Whallen's dominance of Louisville politics in his memoirs, describing Whallen's Green Room as "the political sewer through which the political filth of Louisville runs". Whallen successfully executed an especially wild scheme in 1892, when he was convinced his choice for city chancellor would lose a fair primary. As primaries were exempt from most election laws, he was able to convince the party that a house-to-house canvass would be superior to any other form of primary election. This had both the effect of disenfranchising thousands of voters who couldn't be at home at the specified times, and ensuring that bought votes were cast the way they were supposed to be.

Throughout his career, Whallen used nearly every method imaginable to manipulate elections. He had police intimidate black voters, and had voting locations in Republican-heavy precincts moved at the last moment or colluded to create impossibly long waits at them. He hired repeat voters, bought votes, threatened to take away patronage jobs, and even managed to annul a primary election in 1899 when it appeared his candidate was going to lose.

In 1900 Whallen's machinations were investigated after the assassination of Governor William Goebel. Whallen had attempted to bribe a senator to oppose Goebel just weeks before the assassination. The massively corrupt 1905 Louisville mayoral election, eventually invalidated by the Kentucky Court of Appeals, was the beginning of the end of his machine's power to buy elections outright. Whallen's machine did manage to elect its chosen candidates in 1909 and 1913, relying increasingly on race-baiting tactics to insinuate that blacks would be given equal rights if a Republican was elected. The machine lost its power after Whallen's death.

Whallen was popular amongst Catholics, immigrants and blue-collar workers, who were often at the center of his schemes.

== Personal life and death ==
Whallen was made a Kentucky Colonel and known by the nickname "Colonel Johnny". He was also given the Cross of Honor, the highest award of the Daughters of the Confederacy.

Whallen married three times, to Marian Hickey, Sarah Jane (last name unknown), and Grace Edwards Goodrich. He had three children with Marian and adopted Grace's daughter.

Whallen died December 3, 1913, following an illness lasting several months. He was buried in Louisville's St. Louis Cemetery. His estate, Spring Bank Park, became Chickasaw Park after his death. His home at 4420 River Park Drive was razed in 1947 and became the site of Bishop Flaget High School.
