= Louisville Board of Aldermen =

The Louisville Board of Aldermen was the legislative branch of government for the City of Louisville prior to its merger with Jefferson County in 2003. It comprised twelve wards.

== History ==
From its earliest days Louisville was governed by a board of trustees. In 1828, when it became Kentucky's first city, government shifted to a ten-member "Common Council". In 1851 the city was given a new charter, keeping the Common Council as a "lower house" to the Board of Aldermen, an "upper house" of the city's legislative power. Originally Aldermen had to live in a ward and be elected by its residents. Reforms in 1893 aimed at reducing corruption allowed citywide election of all Aldermen, who could live in any ward.

In 1929 the larger but less prestigious Common Council was eliminated, leaving just the Board of Aldermen as the city's sole legislative body, in an arrangement that would become familiar to Louisvillians over the next 75 years.

Hattie E. Hoffman became the first female Alderman in 1929. Eugene S. Clayton became the first black Alderman in 1945, and W.J. Hodge became the first black president in 1977. The first female president was Melissa Mershon in 1990. Denise Bentley was elected the first black female president in 2002. Tina Ward-Pugh insisted on being referred to as an "Alderwoman" in 1999.

Party primaries in the individual wards began to be held in 1981.

== Job description ==
Aldermen served a two-year term, and the salary was not intended as compensation for a full-time position, but merely to allow them to spend less time at their jobs in order to serve the city.

In 1981 Aldermen were each given a full-time assistant, and in 1994 a pool of nine additional aides was created to be shared by all Aldermen.

== Wards ==
Wards were also created with the 1828 city charter, with five total wards initially. A new charter in 1851 increased the number of wards to eight. The number increased to 12 in 1893, and remained there until city-county merger 110 years later.

Wards were originally split contiguously on an east-to-west axis across the city. Due to the nature of the local geography, the city could only expand south in most places, making most wards very long and thin by the mid-20th century. In 1961 boundaries were completely redrawn to reflect traditional neighborhood boundaries, and were to be redrawn after every census to keep the population of each balanced.

== See also ==
- History of Louisville, Kentucky
- List of mayors of Louisville, Kentucky
