= Samuel D. Gross =

19th-century American academic trauma surgeon

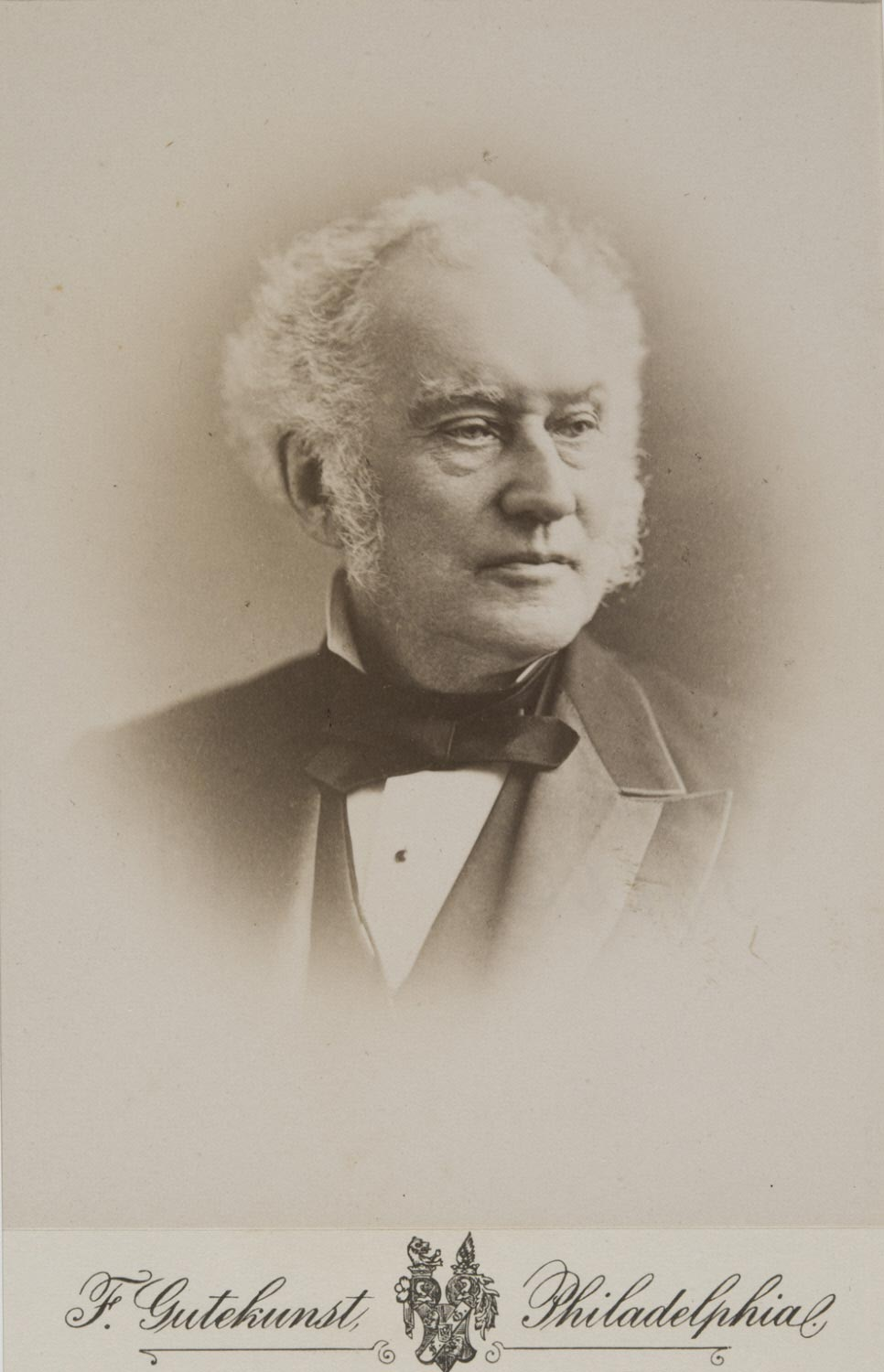
- Gross circa 1875 by Frederick Gutekunst
- Born: July 8, 1805; Easton, Pennsylvania, U.S.
- Died: May 6, 1884 (aged 78); Philadelphia, Pennsylvania, U.S.
- Scientific career
- Fields: surgery

Signature
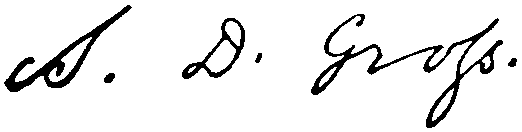

Samuel David Gross (July 8, 1805 – May 6, 1884) was an American academic trauma surgeon. Surgeon biographer Isaac Minis Hays called Gross "The Nestor of American Surgery." He is immortalized in Thomas Eakins' The Gross Clinic (1875), a prominent American painting of the nineteenth century. A bronze statue of him was cast by Alexander Stirling Calder and erected on the National Mall, but moved in 1970 to Thomas Jefferson University in Philadelphia.

== Early life and training ==
Born on a farm near Easton, Pennsylvania, Gross developed an interest in plants, trees, and flowers. He grew up speaking Pennsylvania Dutch, a dialect of German, and supposedly resolved to be a doctor when he was only five years old. At the age of 17 he was apprenticed to a local physician, then another, but both of these experiences soon proved unsatisfactory. He then started to work under the tutelage of Dr. Joseph K. Swift, a graduate of the University of Pennsylvania. Swift realized quickly that Gross' rudimentary education was insufficient training for work as a doctor. Gross then returned to preparatory school, first attending Wilkes-Barre Academy. He went on to another school in the Bowery in New York (where he received a background in classical studies) and Lawrenceville School in New Jersey.

At 19, Gross returned to Swift's office, where he learned mineralogy, anatomy, surgery, Materia Medica, therapeutics, physiology, obstetrics, and French. He also received a fair amount of clinical experience with Swift's patients. After a year of training under Swift, he took a six-week vacation due to ill health. Swift advised him to attend the University of Pennsylvania for further training, but Gross opted for the newly founded Jefferson Medical College in Philadelphia, as he greatly admired the founder of the school, Professor of Surgery Dr. George McClellan, and his colleague, Dr. John Eberle, Professor of Medicine. Gross entered Jefferson in the fall of 1826 and graduated in 1828 in a class of 27 students.

== Early career in Pennsylvania and Ohio ==
Gross began practice in an office at the corner of Fifth and Library Streets in Philadelphia. His patients were few, and he spent much of the time translating French and German medical texts into English, but this did not augment his income sufficiently. He married a twenty-year-old widow with one child, and soon moved back to Easton, where the cost of living was lower and there were greater opportunities for young physicians. He purchased a home there and built a small laboratory in the rear where he spent several hours a day on human and animal dissection. He also became interested in research on blood coagulation, gastric and renal excretion, animal inoculation of smallpox, and pulmonary pathology following strangulation. When a cholera epidemic struck Easton, he was sent to New York by the town council in order to learn about approved treatments for the disease.

Gross wanted to become a teacher of anatomy, and in 1833 he contacted John Eberle, his former professor at Jefferson and then professor of Materia Medica at the Medical College of Ohio in Cincinnati. Eberle was able to obtain Gross a position as demonstrator of anatomy there, and soon afterwards Gross moved to Cincinnati with his wife and two children. However, jealousy from the head of the Anatomy Department meant that he was unable to lecture in the regular amphitheater but instead was relocated to an attic space. A short time later Gross accepted a position as chief of pathological anatomy in the Medical Department of the Cincinnati College. There he met Dr. Daniel Drake, with whom he formed a close personal friendship that lasted until Drake's death in 1852.

== Transfer to Louisville ==
In 1839, the college in Cincinnati folded. Drake had previously accepted the chair of pathological anatomy and clinical medicine at the Louisville Medical Institute, founded in 1833, and his influence caused Gross to accept a job at this school, refusing professorships from the University of Virginia and the University of Louisiana. Gross and his family took up residence at the Louisville Hotel in 1840, and shortly thereafter he established an office and residence on the east side of Fifth Street between Green (now Liberty) and Walnut Streets. The 1847 city directory listed his office and house on the north side of Walnut Street between Third and Fourth.

Soon after his arrival, in 1841 Gross set up a dog laboratory in the basement of the college building, which was then only two years old and described "as for beauty and convenience not surpassed by any similar edifice on the continent." $30,000 had been spent on the structure and $20,000 for the purchase of books, chemical apparatus and anatomical preparations in Europe by Dr. Joshua Flint, Gross' predecessor as Professor of Surgery. Lectures at the college began the first Monday in November and lasted until March. Dissecting rooms were opened the first of October to purchasers of advance tickets. Students were also freely admitted to the wards of the Louisville Marine Hospital, in existence from 1823. Gross also entered into private practice, which he conducted at St. Joseph Hospital, opened November 20, 1836, as St. Vincent's Infirmary and housed in an eponymous orphanage on Jefferson Street. In 1853, it moved to a rented building on the west side of Fourth Street between Chestnut and Broadway.

He remained in Louisville for sixteen years, except for a year spent on the faculty of the University of the City of New York. With Drake and his colleagues, Gross helped make the Louisville Medical Institute the most important medical center in the western United States. During Gross's time there, the institution attained a reputation equal to similar ones east of the Appalachian Mountains, and at the time of Gross's hiring, his fellow professors at Louisville had all attained national if not international fame in their respective fields.

Gross's tenure in Louisville, however, was not without controversy. His predecessor, Joshua Flint, had become famous as a surgeon in New England before coming to Louisville, and in 1850 Flint accepted a position as chief of surgery in the newly organized Kentucky School of Medicine, a move which began a bitter rivalry between that institution and the Louisville Medical Institute until the two schools were merged in 1908. Gross became very popular in social circles, however. He and his family were close friends with the Crittendens, Breckenridges, Wooleys, Prestons, Wickliffes, Pirtles, Ballards, Rowans, Guthries, and Prentices. Gross had even been a guest of Henry Clay at his estate, "Ashland," in Lexington. He was a member of the Unitarian Church and the St. George Lodge of Masons. In 1854, he also became a member of the American Philosophical Society. In August 1855, Gross, a close friend of John Barbee, the Mayor of Louisville, helped save the Catholic Cathedral on Fifth Street from an anti-foreign Know-Nothing Party mob that intended to burn it down in what was known as the Bloody Monday riot.

== Return to Philadelphia ==
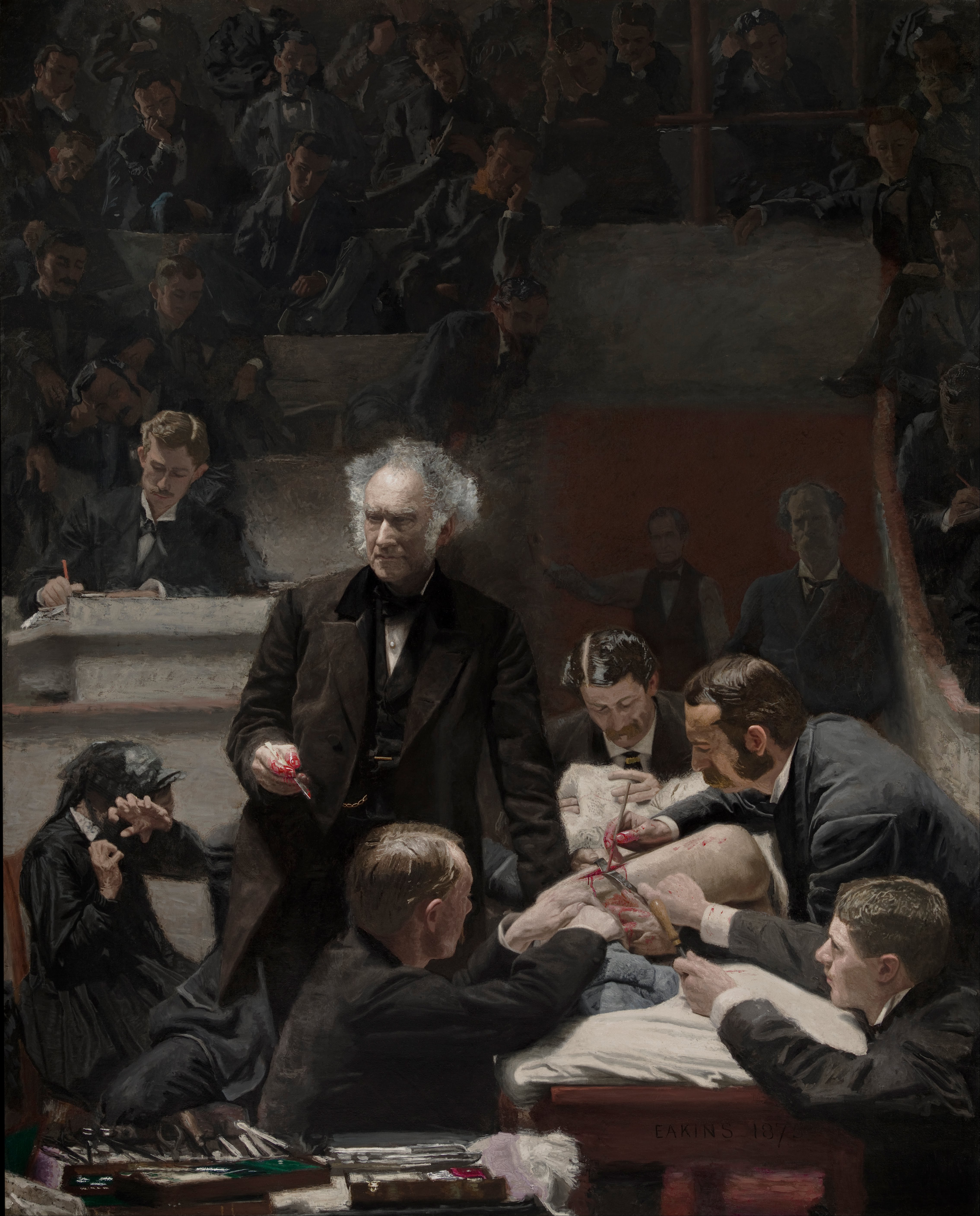
Samuel Gross (standing) in The Gross Clinic by Thomas Eakins

In 1856, Gross's alma mater, Jefferson Medical College, offered him a position as professor of surgery, and he accepted it despite having turned down a similar position from the University of Pennsylvania the previous year. Before he left for Philadelphia, however, the citizens of Louisville honored him with a grand ball at the Galt House. During the Civil War, Gross served as a surgical consultant for the U.S. Surgeon General, and prepared a small handbook on military medicine.

In Philadelphia Gross became one of the most prominent members of several medical organizations as physicians in the United States increasingly sought to professionalize their vocation. He served as the twentieth president of the American Medical Association (AMA), and delivered the presidential address at the 1868 session, where the first item on the agenda was to more efficiently publish and create a more scholarly and scientific focus for the Transactions of the American Medical Association, the forerunner of the Journal of the American Medical Association. During his time in Philadelphia Gross also helped found the American Surgical Association and the Philadelphia Pathological Association. Earlier in Kentucky he had founded, with T.G. Richardson, the Louisville Medical Review and the North American Chirurgical Review.

In 1875 Gross returned to Louisville for a meeting of the AMA, where he was re-elected president and entertained lavishly, even being presented by the physicians of Kentucky with two thoroughbred horses. He made his final visit to Kentucky two years later, in 1877, when he gave a memorial oration in honor of the famous surgeon Ephraim McDowell in Danville. Gross was presented with the original door knocker from McDowell's home; for a time the gift resided in the collection of the Museum of the College of Physicians in Philadelphia, but has since been returned to the McDowell house in Danville, where it is kept under glass.

=== The Gross Clinic ===
Also in 1875, Gross was depicted by artist Thomas Eakins in his celebrated painting The Gross Clinic, which Eakins showed at the 1876 Centennial Exposition in Philadelphia. However, the graphic nature of the painting led the judges in the artistic section to banish it to the section on medical displays. The painting lionizes Gross at the peak of his career, skillfully performing the removal of a malignancy in the thigh of a young patient while explaining the surgical techniques to a captivated audience of students in the medical amphitheater at Jefferson Medical College. Thus Eakins depicted Gross as a titan in his dual capacities as both physician and teacher. The painting is now considered one of the greatest works of nineteenth century American art.

The painting clearly shows that Dr. Gross was not convinced of the efficacy of antisepsis, despite the recent work of Joseph Lister and Louis Pasteur demonstrating the germ theory to explain infections. All participants and onlookers of the depicted surgery in the painting wear normal clothing, not sterilized surgical gowns; there is no sign of gloves or surgical masks; and the presumption is that none of the instruments or hands were sterilized before surgery. Dr. Gross is quoted as saying: "Little if any faith is placed by any enlightened or experienced surgeon on this side of the Atlantic in the so-called carbolic acid treatment of Professor Lister".

In contrast, we see in Eakins' later painting, The Agnew Clinic, a move towards sterility in the surgical theater.

Fourteen years later, Eakins produced a similar painting, The Agnew Clinic (1889), depicting Gross's counterpart, David Hayes Agnew, performing surgery in the amphitheater at the University of Pennsylvania. The Agnew Clinic is now on loan to the Philadelphia Museum of Art, which also shares ownership of The Gross Clinic with the Pennsylvania Academy of the Fine Arts. Thomas Jefferson University sold the latter painting in late 2006.

== Death ==
Gross died on May 6, 1884, at age 78, in Philadelphia. He was cremated at Le Moyne Crematory and his ashes were buried in The Woodlands Cemetery. Gross' estate, aside from a few bequests, was divided equally among his four children. His library, consisting of more than 5,000 volumes, was willed to the Philadelphia Academy of Surgery, along with his wet preparations, diagrams, and museum. To the same institution he left $5,000; interest on this sum is awarded every five years to the best essay on surgical pathology.

== Honors ==
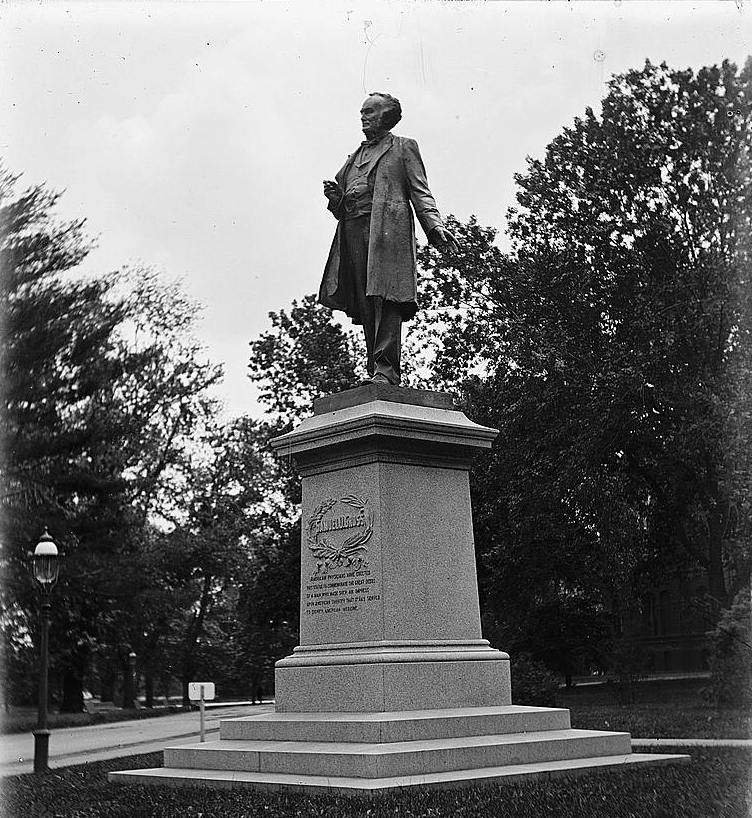
Samuel D. Gross statue

Gross received many posthumous accolades. A bronze statue was dedicated by president William McKinley, in the Smithsonian Park of the U.S. Capitol on a pedestal appropriated by the U.S. Congress. In 1970 it was relocated to the campus of Thomas Jefferson University in Center City Philadelphia.

In Louisville a portrait of him hangs in the Fred Rankin Amphitheater, and since 1941, the Phi Delta Epsilon Medical Fraternity has sponsored an annual Samuel D. Gross lectureship.

== Writings ==
After Gross moved to Cincinnati, he ceased his translation work and began to publish original contributions to the scientific field. In 1839, Gross published Elements of Pathological Anatomy, the first systematic treatise on the subject in the United States; its two volumes were lavishly illustrated with woodcuts and colored engravings. The second edition received praise form the eminent German scientist Rudolf Virchow. Gross's 1859 two-volume System of Surgery is perhaps his best known work. His other publications include:

- The Anatomy, Physiology, and Diseases of the Bones and Joints (1830)
- An Experimental and Critical Inquiry into the Nature and Treatment of Wounds of the Intestines (1843)
- A Practical Treatise on the Diseases, Injuries, and Malformations of the Urinary Bladder, the Prostate Gland, and the Urethra (1851)
- A Practical Treatise on Foreign Bodies in the Air-Passages (1854)

Gross was also interested in history, as he published several medical biographies and wrote on the history of Kentucky. In 1861 he edited The Lives of Eminent American Physicians and Surgeons of the Nineteenth Century, and once gave a talk to the Kentucky State Medical Association wherein he resurrected the career of the early Kentucky physician Dr. Ephraim McDowell. Early in the nineteenth century McDowell had removed a urinary stone from a young James K. Polk, and distinguished himself as one of the most capable surgeons in America and the originator of abdominal surgery, as well as being the first ovariotomist.

== Bibliography ==
- Hajdu, Steven I (2007), "Samuel D. Gross of Philadelphia: pathologist, surgeon, and medical historian", Ann. Clin. Lab. Sci., vol. 37, no. 1, pp. 102–4, PMID 17311878
- Toledo-Pereyra, Luis H (2006), "Samuel D. Gross: the nestor of American surgery", Journal of Investigative Surgery : The Official Journal of the Academy of Surgical Research, vol. 19, no. 3, pp. 141–5, doi:10.1080/08941930600745676, PMID 16809223, S2CID 8200625
- "Samuel David Gross", The Yale Journal of Biology and Medicine, vol. 76, no. 3 (published May 1, 2003), p. 128, 2003, ISSN 0044-0086, PMC 2582700, PMID 15369628
- Malkin, H M (2001), "Samuel David Gross—America's first pathologist", Annals of Diagnostic Pathology, vol. 5, no. 2 (published April 2001), pp. 121–7, doi:10.1053/adpa.2001.23033, PMID 11294999
- Sherk, H H; Simons, K S (1998), "Charges of unethical conduct made by the Camden County Medical Society against Samuel D. Gross, M.D. and Joseph Pancoast, M.D", Transactions & Studies of the College of Physicians of Philadelphia, vol. 20 (published December 1998), pp. 98–113, PMID 10207528
- Mullins, R J; Trunkey, D D (1990), "Samuel D. Gross: pioneer academic trauma surgeon of 19th century America", The Journal of Trauma, vol. 30, no. 5 (published May 1990), pp. 528–38, doi:10.1097/00005373-199005000-00002, PMID 2188000
- "The American medical literature. Samuel D. Gross, report on the causes which impede the progress of American medical literature, 1856", Transactions & Studies of the College of Physicians of Philadelphia, vol. 5, no. 3 (published September 1983), p. 176, 1983, PMID 6353693
- Wagner, F B (1981), "Revisit of Samuel D. Gross, M.D", Surgery, Gynecology & Obstetrics, vol. 152, no. 5 (published May 1981), pp. 663–74, PMID 7013125
- Smith, M J (1978), "Samuel David Gross (1805–1884)", Investigative Urology, vol. 15, no. 6 (published May 1978), pp. 507–8, PMID 348636
- "The classic: Sarcoma of the long bones: based upon a study of one hundred and sixty-five cases. Samuel W. Gross", Clin. Orthop. Relat. Res., no. 111 (published September 1975), pp. 5–13, 1975, PMID 1098829
- "Foreign medical textbooks (Samuel D. Gross)", Bulletin of the New York Academy of Medicine, vol. 49, no. 8, pp. 745–6, August 1973, ISSN 0028-7091, PMC 1807071, PMID 4580855
- "Natives and foreigners at the university. From Samuel D, Gross: report on the causes which impede the progress of American medical literature. Trans.A.M.A. 9:339–62,1856", Bulletin of the New York Academy of Medicine, vol. 49, no. 2 (published February 1973), p. 160, 1973, PMC 1806923, PMID 4567273
- Ono, J (1969), "[On Samuel David Gross]", Nihon ishigaku zasshi. [Journal of Japanese history of medicine], vol. 15, pp. 146–58, PMID 11616378
- "Samuel D. Gross (1805-1884)— Surgical Pathologist", JAMA, vol. 189, no. 13 (published September 28, 1964), pp. 1024–5, 1964, doi:10.1001/jama.1964.03070130044017, PMID 14188881
- COHEN, A E (1955), "The Samuel D. Gross sesquicentennial", The Journal of the Kentucky State Medical Association, vol. 53, no. 11 (published November 1955), pp. 981–2, passim, PMID 13271866
- Hodge, E B; Mitchell, C F; Smyth, C M (1939), "The Samuel D. Gross Prize: Fifteen Hundred Dollars", Ann. Surg., vol. 110, no. 1 (published July 1939), p. 160, PMC 1391327, PMID 17857434
- Graham, E A (1937), "Samuel Gross Looks in on the American Surgical Association", Ann. Surg., vol. 106, no. 4 (published October 1937), pp. 481–91, doi:10.1097/00000658-193710000-00001, PMC 1390604, PMID 17857052
- Wagner FB Jr, Savacool JW, eds. Jefferson Medical College of Thomas Jefferson University: Legend & Lore. Devon, PA: W.T. Cooke Pub., 1996.
