= St. Martin of Tours Catholic Church (Louisville, Kentucky) =

Parish church in Kentucky, United States

Coordinates: 38°14′43.7″N 85°44′20.1″W

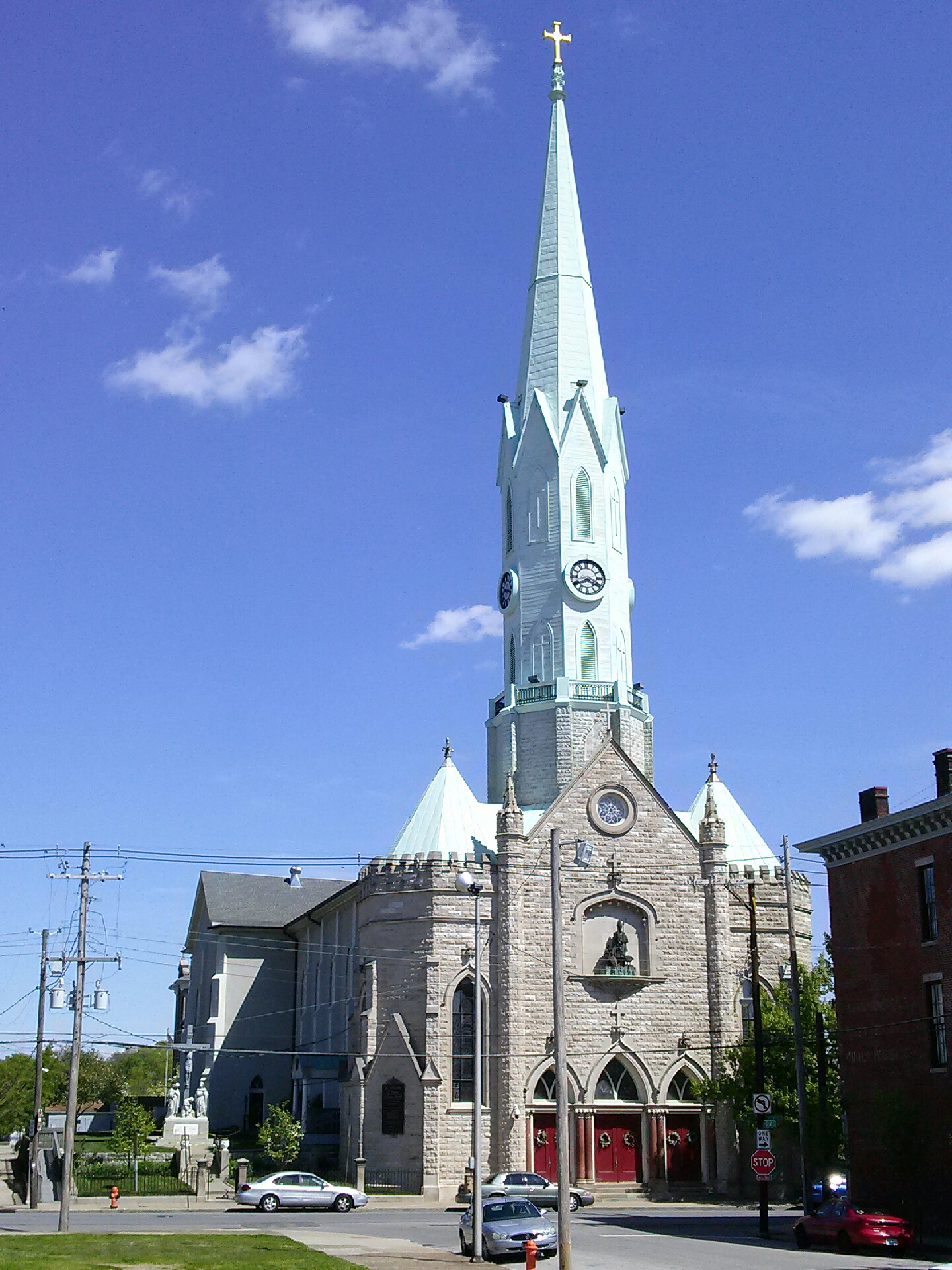
The façade of St. Martin of Tours looking down Gray Street toward Shelby Street

St. Martin of Tours Catholic Church is a Roman Catholic parish church in Louisville, Kentucky. It is the fourth parish in the city and one of the oldest in the Archdiocese of Louisville. Founded as a church for German immigrants on the east side of Louisville in 1853, the church building was completed and dedicated on August 20, 1854. Expanded in the 1860s and renovated in the 1890s, the church building remains one of the oldest large structures and one of the few remaining antebellum public buildings in Louisville.

== History ==
St. Martin of Tours Church is notable for its role in bringing several religious orders to the Louisville area. Its first priests were German Franciscans, who had already established foundations in Cincinnati and at the first German parish in the city, St. Boniface. The first pastor, Fr. Leander Streber, OFM, was responsible for introducing the Ursuline sisters to the city, and it has been suggested that these sisters were the first to establish a foundation of that order within the borders of the United States (other older foundations currently in the country were not under the American government at the time of their founding). These sisters established the first parish school at St. Martin of Tours in 1858 and shortly thereafter founded the Ursuline Academy for girls one block away. In 1863 the Xaverian Brothers began a school for boys at St. Martin of Tours, their first establishment in the city. In 1888, the Brothers of Mary took over the instruction of the boys in a new building that now serves as the rectory and parish offices. These brothers continued teaching at the parish until 1917, when the Ursuline sisters took over all instruction at the parish school.

The political turmoil of mid-nineteenth-century America played an important part in the early history of the parish, and that of the greater immigrant Catholic population of Louisville. On August 6, 1855, the members of the Know-Nothing party, whipped into hysteria by the flame-fanning of the editor of the Louisville Journal, aimed their revolt at the Cathedral of the Assumption on 5th Street and at St. Martin of Tours Church. Suspecting the German Catholics at St. Martin's of armed, anti-government organizing, the Know-Nothings intended to burn both churches to the ground. Through the intervention of the bishop, Martin John Spalding, who invited the Know-Nothing mayor of Louisville to inspect the premises of both buildings, the Catholic congregations were exonerated. All the same, at least 20 people died in what came to be known as the Bloody Monday Riots.

On May 18, 2023, Archbishop Shelton Fabre designated the church a diocesan shrine.

== Relics and artifacts ==
The church building underwent significant changes in the 1890s, including a new vaulted ceiling, new stained-glass windows from the Royal Bavarian Art Glass Institute, and a new stone façade complete with a bronze statue of St. Martin. Among the church's artistic treasures from this period is also its pipe organ, which was built by the Farrand & Votey firm of Detroit. The short-lived pipe organ shop at that company was populated by the craftsman from the recently defunct Roosevelt organ company. Among the contributions these organ builders made to organ design was the first electric action patents in the country. When these craftsmen were brought over to Farrand & Votey, they brought their patents with them. In 1894, St. Martin of Tours contracted for a new 3-manual and pedal pipe organ with Farrand & Votey and that instrument has remained largely unchanged since its installation. It remains one of the few and largest remaining electric-action organs from that seminal era in the world.

Still, the parish was in need of more relics. In June 1901, the Right Reverend Monsignor Mezzolinski, secretary to Cardinal Mieczysław Halka Ledóchowski, wrote to the pastor of St. Martin of Tours, Monsignor Francis Zabler: "At last I can fulfill your wish. The venerable Cistercian Nuns of Agnani [!], Italy, must give up their sanctuary and relinquish their monastery and seek another house. In their sad plight, Pope Leo XIII has given them permission to donate the relics of certain martyrs under certain conditions. I myself have been at Agnani to investigate the authenticity of these relics. Without a doubt they are genuine." The remains must have been kept by the Cistercian Sisters of Charity of SS. Cosmas and Damian in Anagni, who collected many relics and antiquities. On December 31, 1901, the skeletal remains of St. Magnus (supposedly Magnus of Trani, the Apulian bishop and martyr) and St. Bonosa, a Roman virgin and martyr, arrived at the Louisville customs office. They were placed in glass reliquaries beneath the north and south transept altars, where they have been venerated ever since. In 2012, these reliquaries were restored after authentication of the remains proven the saints' stories as inconclusive, and their altars were renovated. On September 9 of that year, St. Magnus and St. Bonosa were solemnly re-interred in a Solemn High Mass. Since Magnus is depicted as a centurion and not as a bishop, he could theoretically be another saint then Magnus of Trani.

== Outreach ==
St. Martin of Tours supports two institutions that serve the poor in downtown Louisville. The Schuhmann Center is named for Mons. George W. Schuhmann (1865–1931) and opened in 1982 to aid homeless persons and others in need with clothing, emergency food, and social service referrals. The Golden Arrow Center for mothers and children was opened in 1997 and provides maternity clothes, children's clothing, diapers, baby food, formula and an emergency pantry. The Golden Arrow Center serves people from throughout the greater-Louisville metro area and is one of the only children's clothing charities in Louisville. The Schumann Center and Golden Arrow Center serve tens of thousands of people each year.

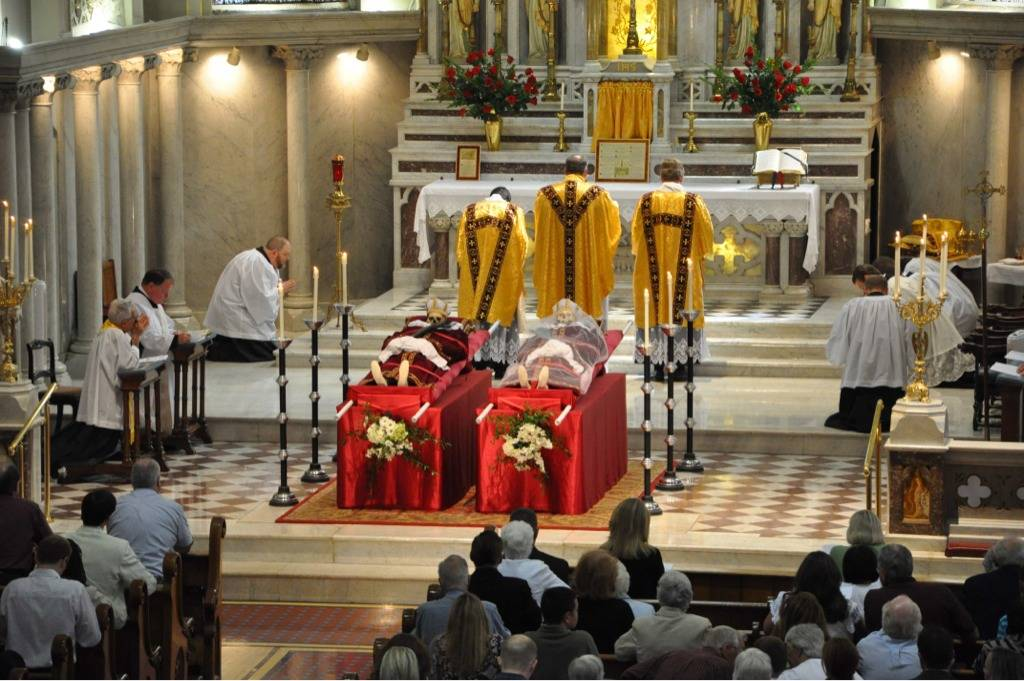
The Shrines of Ss. Magnus and Bonosa were renovated and restored in 2012, and the relics of the saints were solemnly reinterred on September 9, 2012.

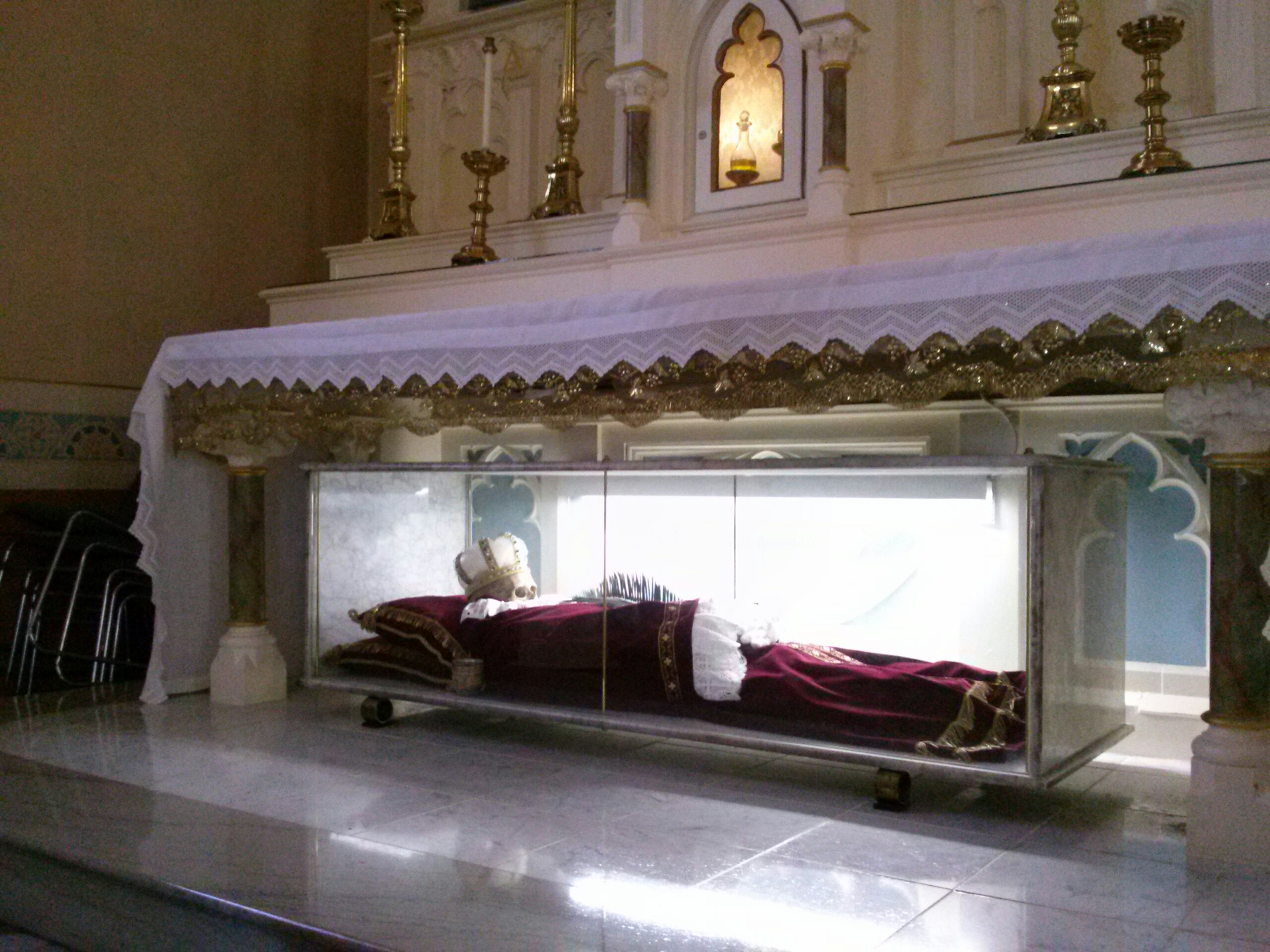
St. Magnus was a 3rd-century, Christian martyr whose relics were interred at St. Martin's Church in 1901. Previously they were kept by the Cistercian Sisters of Charity of SS. Cosmas and Damian in Anagni.

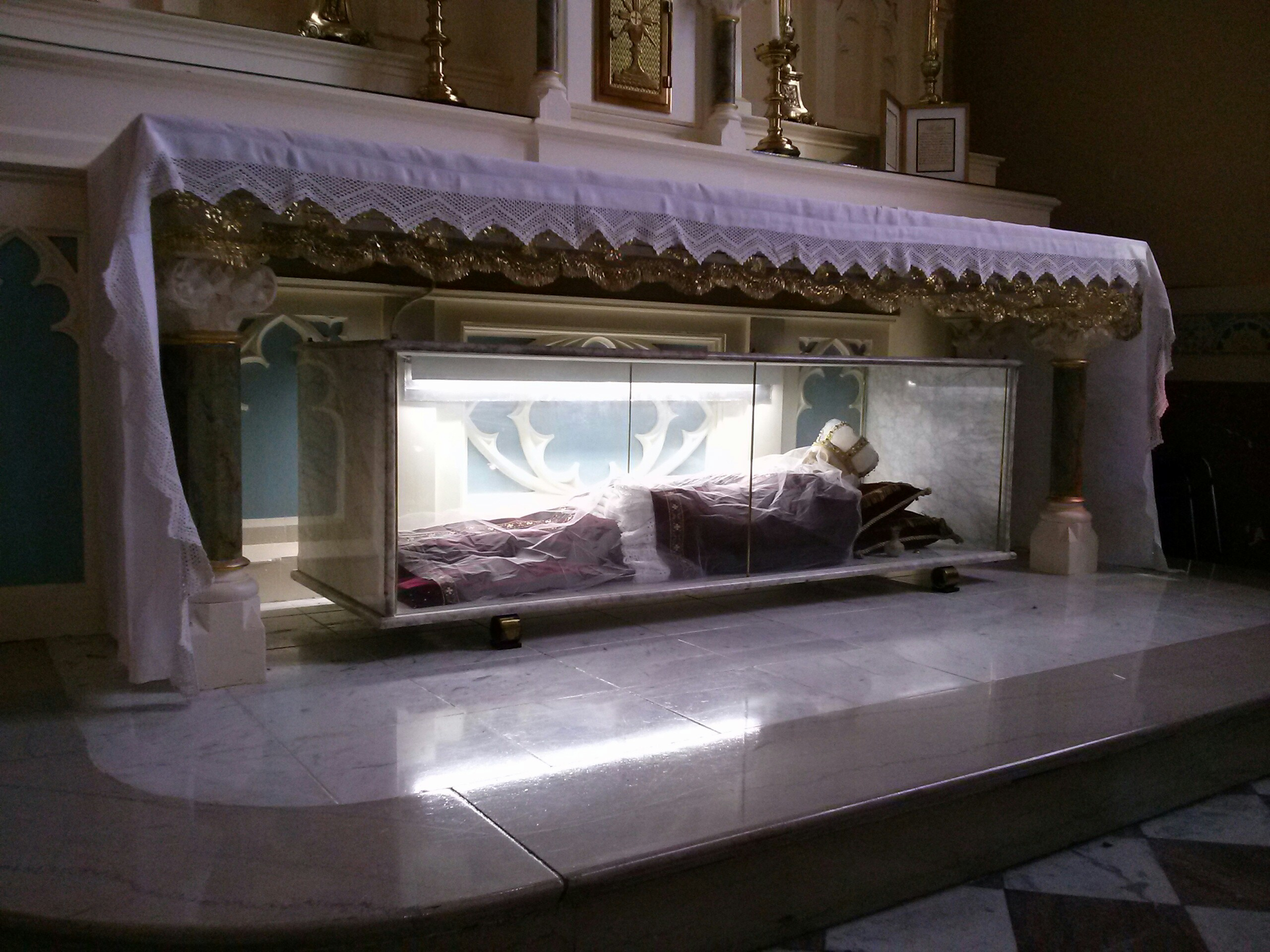
St. Bonosa was a 3rd-century, Christian martyr whose relics were interred at St. Martin's Church in 1901. Previously they had been removed from the Roman catacombs, before arriving at the Cistercian Sisters of Charity of SS. Cosmas and Damian in Anagni.

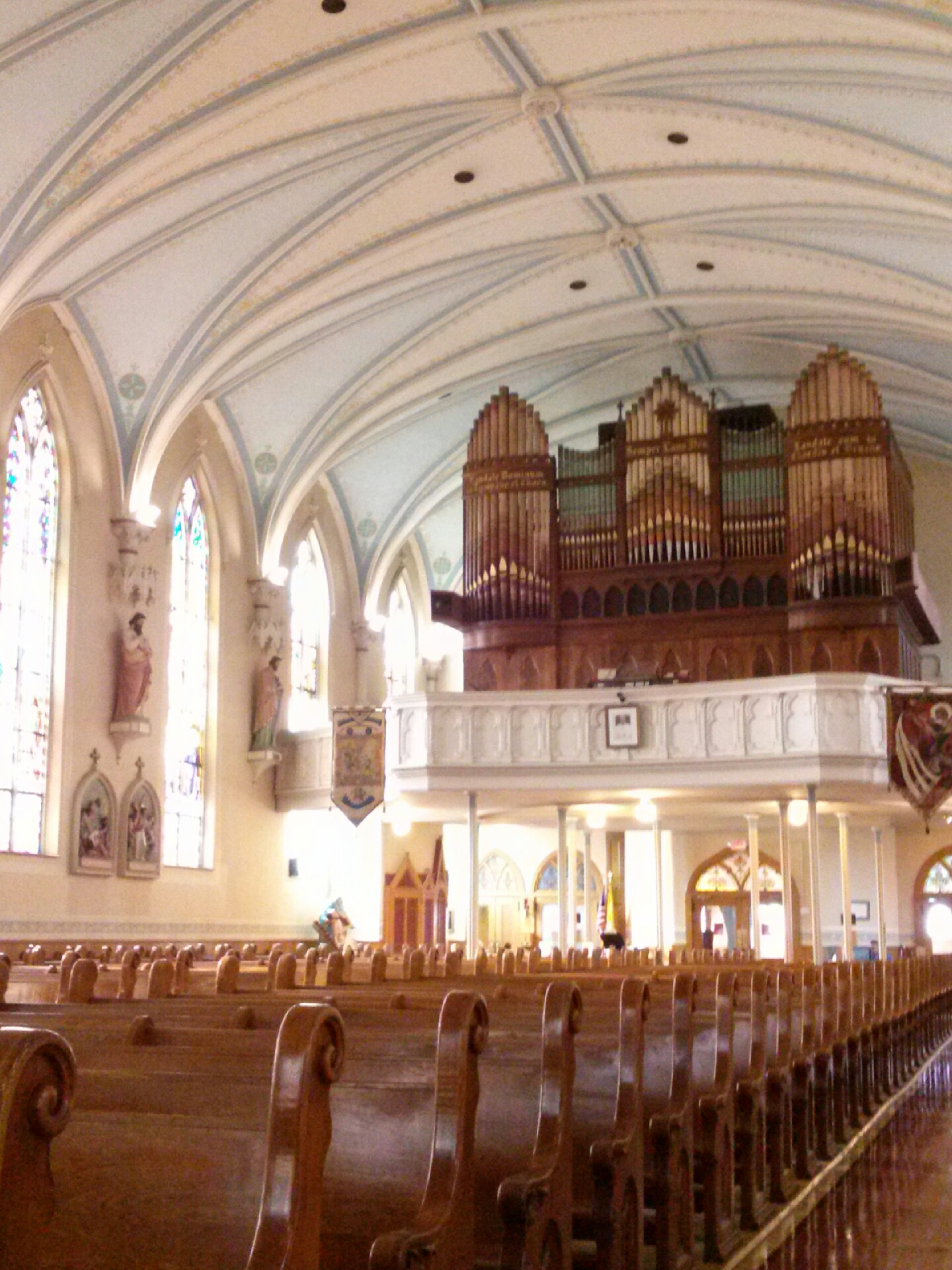
The Farrand & Votey organ is a 3-manual and pedal pipe organ that was installed at St. Martin of Tours Church in 1894, with the console being rebuilt in the style of the original by the Miller Pipe Organ Co.

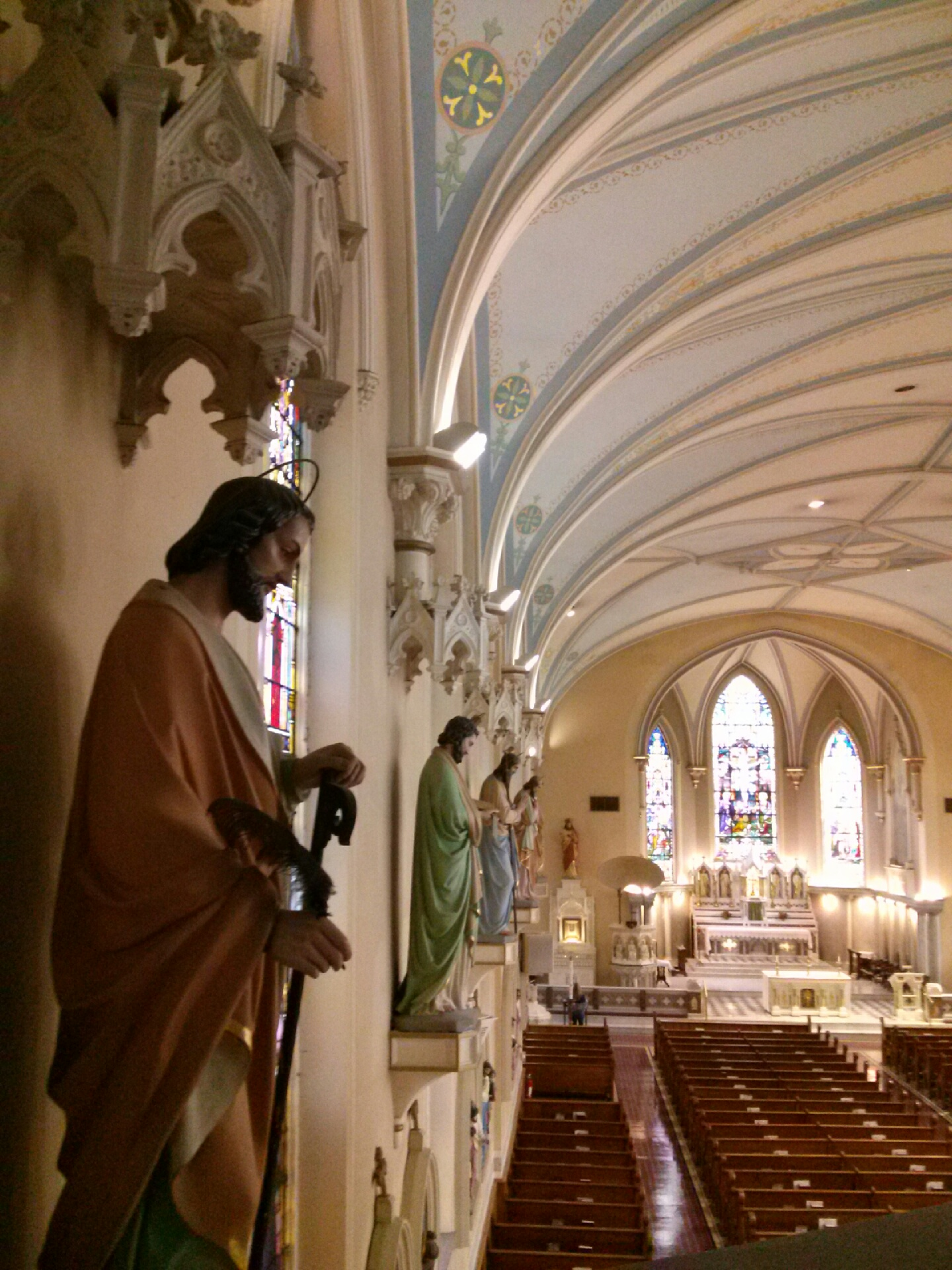
View of the statues of the apostles the line the clerestory level of the church nave with the sanctuary in the distance.

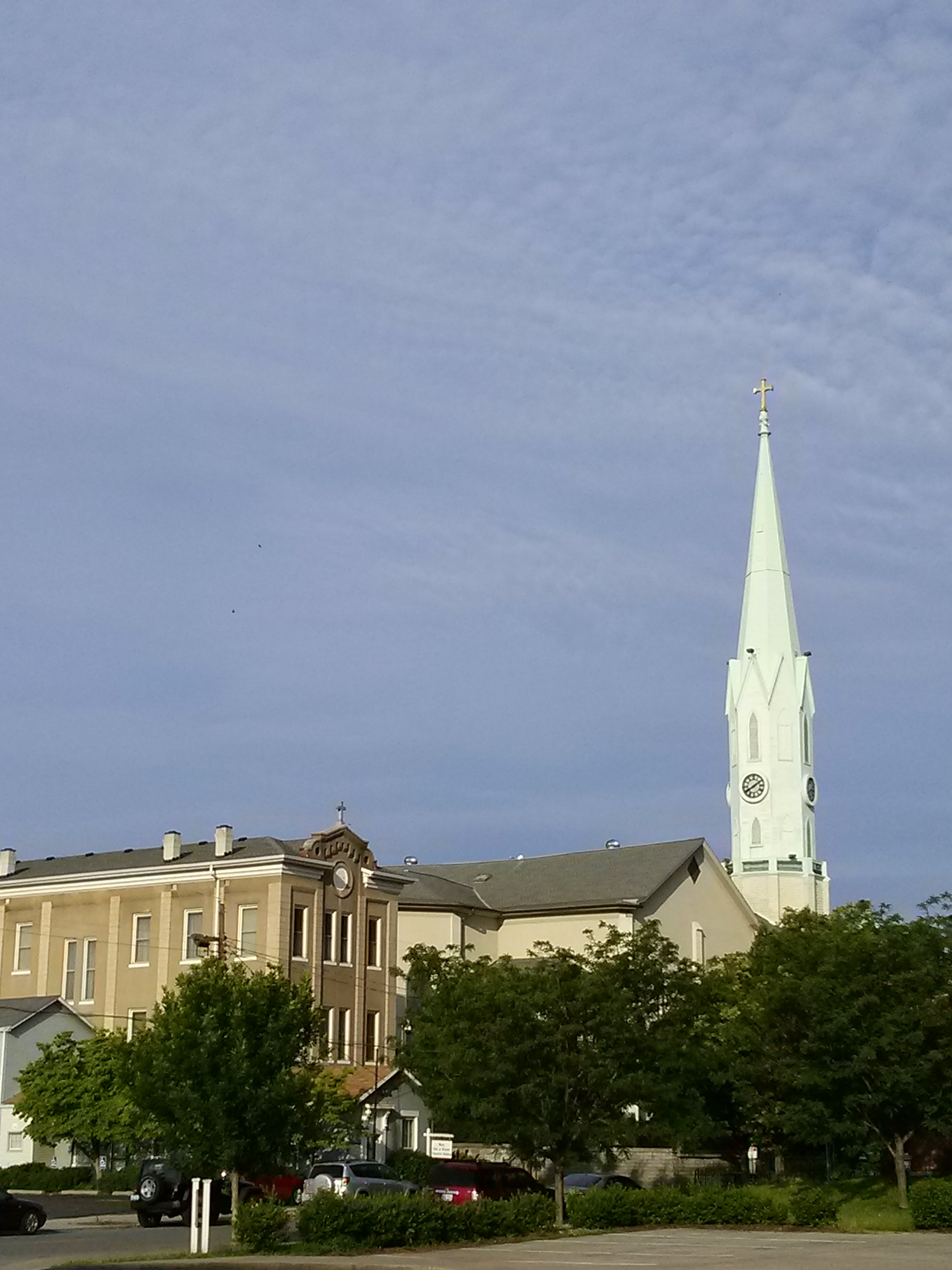
View of the 1888 boys school with the church in the background.

== Sources ==
- Spoekler, Rev. Bernard A. "1853-1953: The Centenary of the Church of Saint Martin of Tours, Louisville, Kentucky." St. Martin of Tours Catholic Church, Louisville, 1953.
- Cousens, Rev. Dennis. "St. Martin of Tours Church: 150 Years of Worship and Service." St. Martin of Tours Catholic Church, Louisville, 2003.
- Crews, Rev. Clyde F. "Faith and Service: Parish Histories. In Celebration of the 200th Anniversary of the Archdiocese of Louisville." Editions du Signe, Strasbourg, 2007.
