= Bloody Monday =

1855 anti-immigrant riot in Louisville, Kentucky

Coordinates: 38°15′28″N 85°46′02″W

- Louisville Bloody Monday Election Riots of 1855
- Date: August 6, 1855
- Location: Louisville, Kentucky, United States
- Caused by: Anti-Catholicism, Anti-immigrant rhetoric
- Methods: Arson, marauding, pogrom, rioting

Parties
Protestant mob; Know-Nothing Party; Anglo-Americans	Catholic residents; Democratic Party; German Americans; Irish Americans

Casualties
- Deaths: 22+
- Arrested: 5
- Detained: 5
- Charged: 5

Bloody Monday was a series of riots on August 6, 1855, in Louisville, Kentucky, an election day, when Protestant mobs attacked Irish and German Catholic neighborhoods. These riots grew out of the bitter rivalry between the Democrats and the Nativist Know-Nothing Party. Multiple street fights raged, leaving twenty-two people dead, scores injured, and much property destroyed by fire. Five people were later indicted, but none were convicted, and the victims were not compensated.

== Causes ==
Bloody Monday was sparked by the Know Nothing political party (officially known as the American Party), fed in large part by the radical, inflammatory anti-immigrant writings, especially those of the editor of the Louisville Journal, George D. Prentice. Irish and Germans were recent arrivals and now comprised a third of the city's population.

Like other major cities on the Ohio and Mississippi Rivers, Louisville grew rapidly in the previous two decades because of heavy immigration from Ireland and Germany. There were 11,000 immigrants out of a white population of 36,000. Most were Catholics, but there was also a large German Lutheran element. The vast majority were Democrats.

== Election day ==
According to the Louisville Daily Journal, by Monday morning, the city was "in possession of an armed mob, the base passions of which were infuriated to the highest pitch by the incendiary appeals of the newspaper organ and the popular leaders of the Know Nothing party." The Know-Nothings formed armed groups to guard the polls on election day. Hundreds were deterred from voting by direct acts of intimidation and others through fear of consequences. In the Sixth Ward, William Thomasson, a former US Representative from the district, appealed to the maddened crowd to cease its acts of disorder and violence but was struck from behind and beaten.

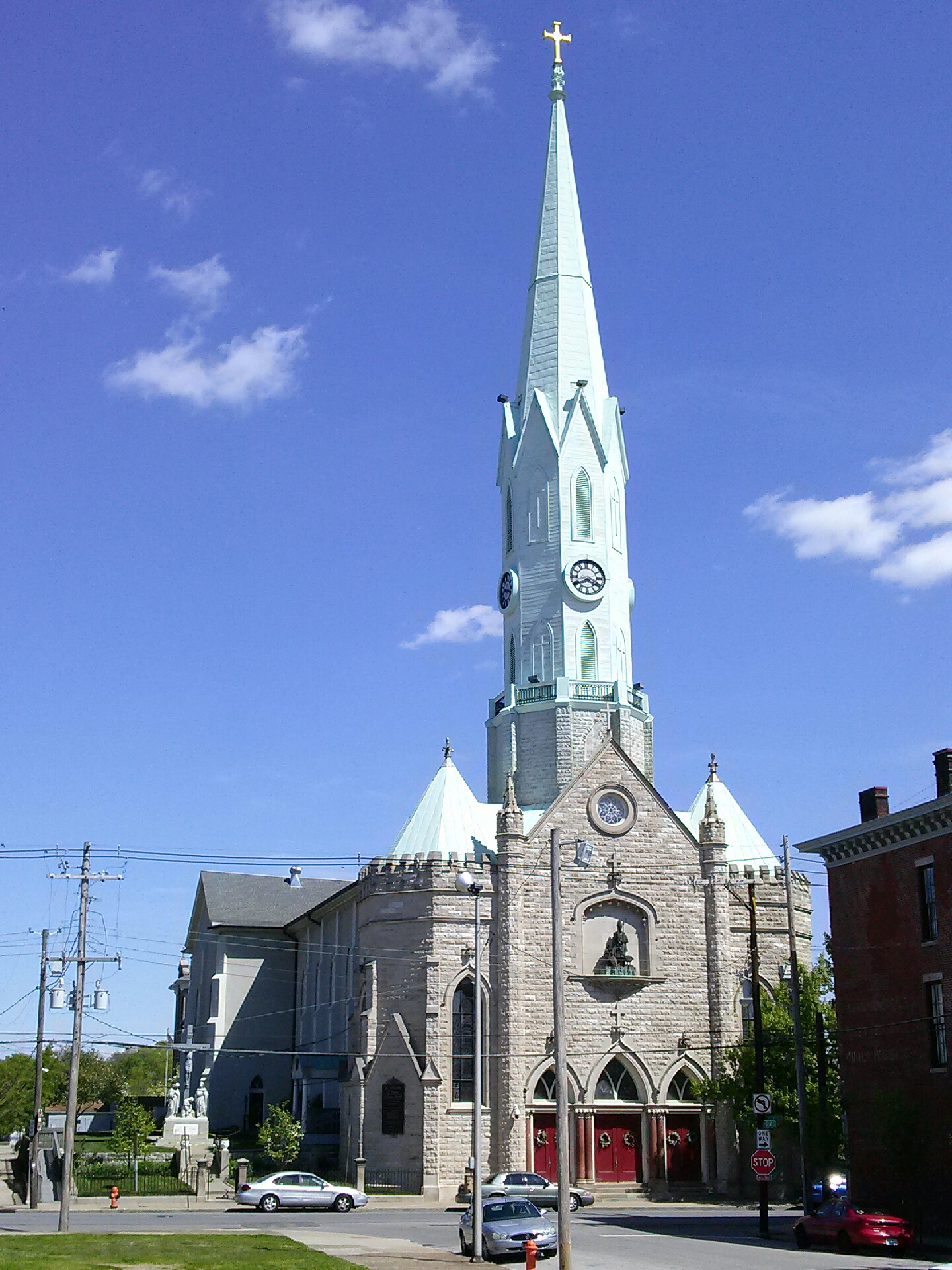
St. Martin of Tours Catholic Church, Louisville, Kentucky

In the afternoon, a general row occurred on Shelby Street, extending from Main to Broadway. Some fourteen or fifteen men were shot, including Officer Williams, Joe Selvage and others. Two or three were killed, and a number of houses, chiefly German coffee houses, broken into and pillaged by Know Nothings. About 4 o'clock, a vast crowd of Know Nothings, armed with shotguns, muskets, and rifles, was proceeding to attack the new German parish of St. Martin of Tours, on Shelby Street. Mayor John Barbee, himself a Know-Nothing, assuaged them, and the mob returned to the First Ward polls. An hour afterwards, the large brewery on Jefferson Street, near the junction of Green, was set on fire. Rev. Karl Boeswald was fatally injured by a hail of flying stones while on his way to visit a dying parishioner.

Late in the afternoon, three Irishmen going down Main Street, near Eleventh, were attacked by Know Nothings, and one was knocked down. Irish in the neighborhood responded by firing repeated volleys from the windows of their houses on Main street. Mr. Rodes, a river-man, was shot and killed by one in the upper story, and a Mr. Graham met with a similar fate. An Irishman who discharged a pistol at the back of a man's head was shot and then hung but survived. After dusk, a row of frame houses on Main street between Tenth and Eleventh, the property of Mr. Quinn, a well known Irishman, were set on fire. The flames extended across the street and twelve buildings were destroyed. These houses were chiefly tenanted by Irish, and upon any of the tenants venturing out to escape the flames, they were immediately shot down. Those badly wounded by gun shot could not escape from the burning buildings.

== Aftermath ==
Only by Louisville Mayor John Barbee's intervention, despite his being a Know-Nothing, were the bloodshed and the property destruction brought to an end, including his personal intervention that saved the Cathedral of the Assumption from destruction by the mob. Immediately after Bloody Monday. Louisville Bishop Martin John Spalding and Protestant leaders called for calm, rather than revenge. When it was over, more than 100 businesses, private homes, and tenements had been vandalized, looted and/or burned, including a block long row of houses known as Quinn's Row. Historians estimate the death toll at 19–22, and Catholics, including Bishop Spalding, set the death toll at well over 100, with entire families consumed in the fires.

Weapons, arms, and later bodies of the dead were stored in Louisville Metro Hall (the old Jefferson County Courthouse, now the Mayor's Office), a Know-Nothing stronghold at the time. Sporadic violence and attacks had occurred in the year and months leading up to August 6 and continued for some time afterward.

No one was ever prosecuted in connection with the riots. The elected Whig mayor, James Stephens Speed, had been ousted in June by a court order. Speed, who upon his marriage had converted to Catholicism, left Louisville for Chicago, never to return.

== Legacy ==
The riots had a profound impact on emigration from Louisville by causing more than ten thousand citizens to pack and leave for good, most to St. Louis, Chicago, and Milwaukee, and a large group left in 1856 for Prairie City, Kansas. Only the Civil War, with the trade and the commerce that it represented halted the trend. The loss of population caused dozens of local businesses to close, affecting arts, education, and charitable causes with the loss of members and money. Empty storefronts were the norm on once-bustling commercial corridors, and many of the destroyed and charred ruins lay untouched for years afterward, as a silent reminder of that terrible day. According to the journalist Peter Smith, some scholars consider the exodus of immigrants fleeing or avoiding Louisville as having weakened the city economically causing it to be eclipsed by St. Louis and Cincinnati, although others disagree.

That year also saw scattered violence in Chicago, St. Louis, Columbus, Cincinnati, and New Orleans. However, within ten years, Louisville elected a German-born man, Philip Tomppert as mayor.

A series of commemorations was held to mark the 150th anniversary of Bloody Monday. According to one of the organizers, Vicky Ullrich, whose German-speaking Swiss ancestors fled to Indiana, "with another influx of immigrants increasing the diversity of Louisville, it's important that Bloody Monday be remembered so that a similar event does not happen again." In 2006, the Louisville Ancient Order of Hibernians, and the German-American Club raised the funds to erect an historic marker at the site of Quinn's Row, which was the site of a small commemoration on March 17, 2015.

== See also ==
- History of Louisville, Kentucky
- List of incidents of civil unrest in the United States
- List of riots
- 1855 Kentucky gubernatorial election
- 1968 Louisville riots
- Order of the Star Spangled Banner
