= Martin John Spalding =

American prelate (1810–1872)

The Most Reverend Martin John Spalding
- Archbishop of Baltimore
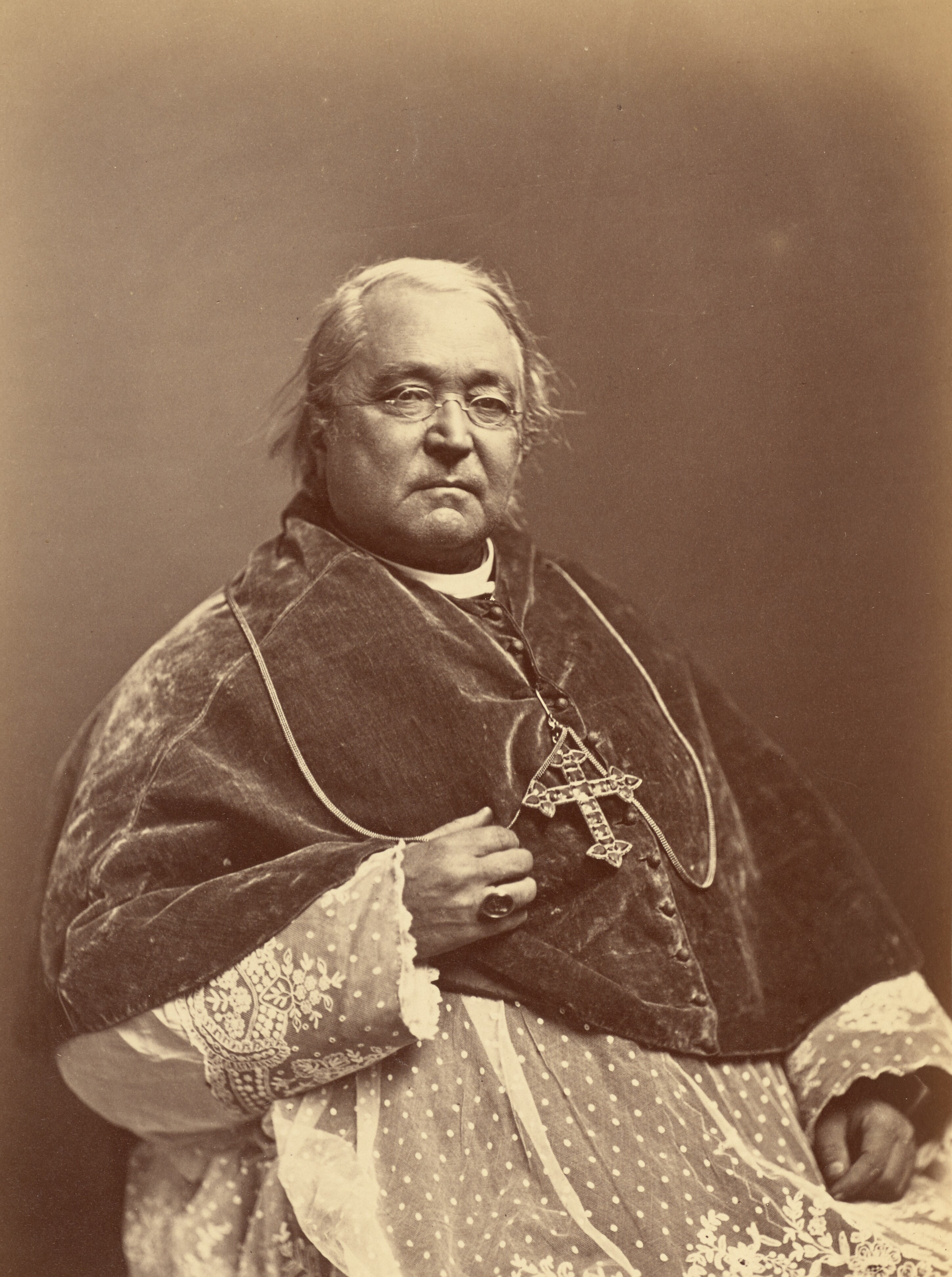
- See: Baltimore
- Appointed: May 6, 1864
- Installed: July 31, 1864
- Term ended: February 7, 1872
- Predecessor: Francis Patrick Kenrick
- Successor: James Roosevelt Bayley
- Previous posts: Coadjutor Bishop of Louisville (1848–1850); Bishop of Louisville (1850–1864)

Orders
- Ordination: August 13, 1834 by Carlo Maria Pedicini
- Consecration: September 10, 1848 by Benedict Joseph Flaget P.S.S.

Personal details
- Born: May 23, 1810 Rolling Fork, Kentucky
- Died: February 7, 1872 (aged 61) Baltimore, Maryland
- Denomination: Catholic
- Education: St. Thomas Seminary; Pontifical Urbaniana University
- Motto: Auspice Maria (Under the protection of Mary)

Styles of Martin John Spalding
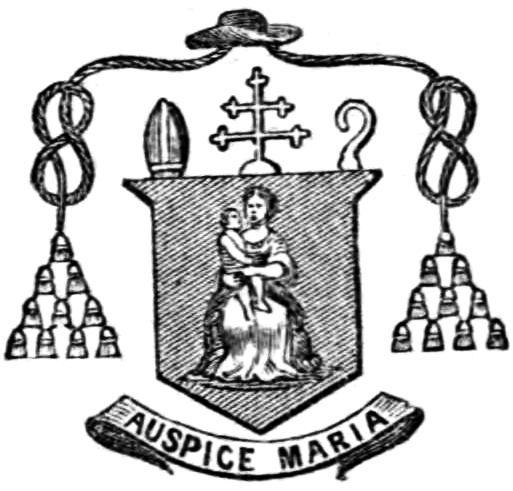
- Reference style: His Excellency; The Right Reverend
- Spoken style: Your Excellency
- Religious style: Bishop

Martin John Spalding (May 23, 1810 – February 7, 1872) was an American Catholic prelate who served as archbishop of Baltimore from 1864 to 1872. He previously served as bishop of Louisville from 1850 to 1864. He advocated aid for freed slaves following the American Civil War. Spalding attended the First Vatican Council, where he first opposed, and then supported, a dogmatic proclamation of papal infallibility.

== Early life and education ==
Martin Spalding was born on May 23, 1810, in Rolling Fork, Kentucky, the sixth of eight children of Richard and Henrietta (née Hamilton) Spalding. His ancestors came to the American colonies from England and Ireland, settling in the British Province of Maryland around the mid-17th century. Spalding's paternal grandfather, Benedict Spalding, moved to Kentucky from St. Mary's County, Maryland in 1790. His mother's family, also from Maryland, moved to Kentucky in 1791. Martin was a distant cousin of Mother Catherine Spalding, co-founder of the Sisters of Charity of Nazareth.

Richard and Henrietta married in 1801. Their son Martin went through many illnesses as a young child. When he was only five or six years of age, Henrietta died; his oldest sister and paternal grandmother then cared for him. Richard remarried twice, and had a total of twenty-one children. When Martin Spalding reached age eight, his family sent him in 1818 to a country school in the area. While at the school, Spalding learned his multiplication tables in one day. He received his first communion in 1820 at age ten.

In 1821, Spalding entered St. Mary's College in Lebanon, Kentucky, where he became a favorite pupil of the school founder, Reverend William Byrne. By age 14, Spalding's math skills were so advanced that Byrne named him as the mathematics instructor at St. Mary's. At one point, a math professor from St. Joseph's College attempted to stump Spalding with difficult math problems, but Spalding solved them all.

By the time Spalding graduated from St. Mary's in 1826 at age 16, he had decided to enter the priesthood. He started his studies at St. Thomas Seminary in Bardstown, Kentucky, in September 1826. He spent the next four years studying philosophy and theology at St. Thomas. The seminary also required its seminarian to teach courses to lay students at the adjoining St. Joseph's College.

In 1830, Bishop Benedict Flaget sent Spalding to Rome to continue his studies at the Pontifical Urbaniana University. After a four-month journey, he arrived in Rome on August 7, 1830. Debilitated by the long trip, Spalding almost died in Rome. After a slow recovery, he continued his studies.

In 1834, Spalding earned a Doctor of Divinity degree from the university, the first American student to do so. He received the degree after a marathon session defending 256 propositions on theology, church history, and canon law from attacks by university faculty and other scholars.

== Priesthood ==
While in Rome, Spalding was ordained a priest for the Diocese of Bardstown by Cardinal Carlo Maria Pedicini on August 13, 1834. Spalding celebrated his first mass over Saint Peter's tomb in the subterranean chapel of St. Peter's Basilica.

Two days after his ordination, Spalding sailed to the United States, wanting to see Flaget again. Spalding arrived in New York City in October 1834. While traveling to Kentucky, he stopped in Philadelphia, Pennsylvania. Bishop Francis Kenrick, his former professor at St. Thomas Seminary, allowed Spalding to preach his first homily at Saint John the Evangelist Cathedral in Philadelphia.

After Spalding arrived in Bardstown in December 1834, Flaget named him rector of St. Joseph's Cathedral and professor of philosophy at St. Thomas Seminary. In addition to these duties, Spalding became the first editor of the weekly Catholic Advocate in 1835; he also founded the Advocate's successor, The Louisville Guardian.

In 1838, Spalding was elected president of St. Joseph's College. However, he soon clashed with Bishop Guy Chabrat, whom the Vatican had appointed as coadjutor bishop in the diocese while Flaget was away in Europe. When Flaget returned home in 1840, Spalding tendered him his resignation as St. Joseph's president and cathedral rector. Flaget then appointed Spalding as pastor of St. Peter's Parish in Lexington, Kentucky. During his priestly ministry, he also assisted the Catholic missions in the Diocese of Nashville. He soon built a reputation as a gifted preacher and lecturer.

In 1841, the Vatican transferred the episcopal see from Bardstown to Louisville, which had become the largest city in Kentucky. The Diocese of Bardstown now became Diocese of Louisville. Spalding then resumed his former role as rector of what was now St. Joseph Proto-Cathedral. In 1844, Flaget named Spalding as vicar general. With Flaget's advancing age and Charbrat's progressive blindness, Spalding assumed administration of the diocese. Chabrat resigned as coadjutor bishop on April 10, 1847.

== Episcopacy ==
=== Coadjutor Bishop and Bishop of Louisville ===
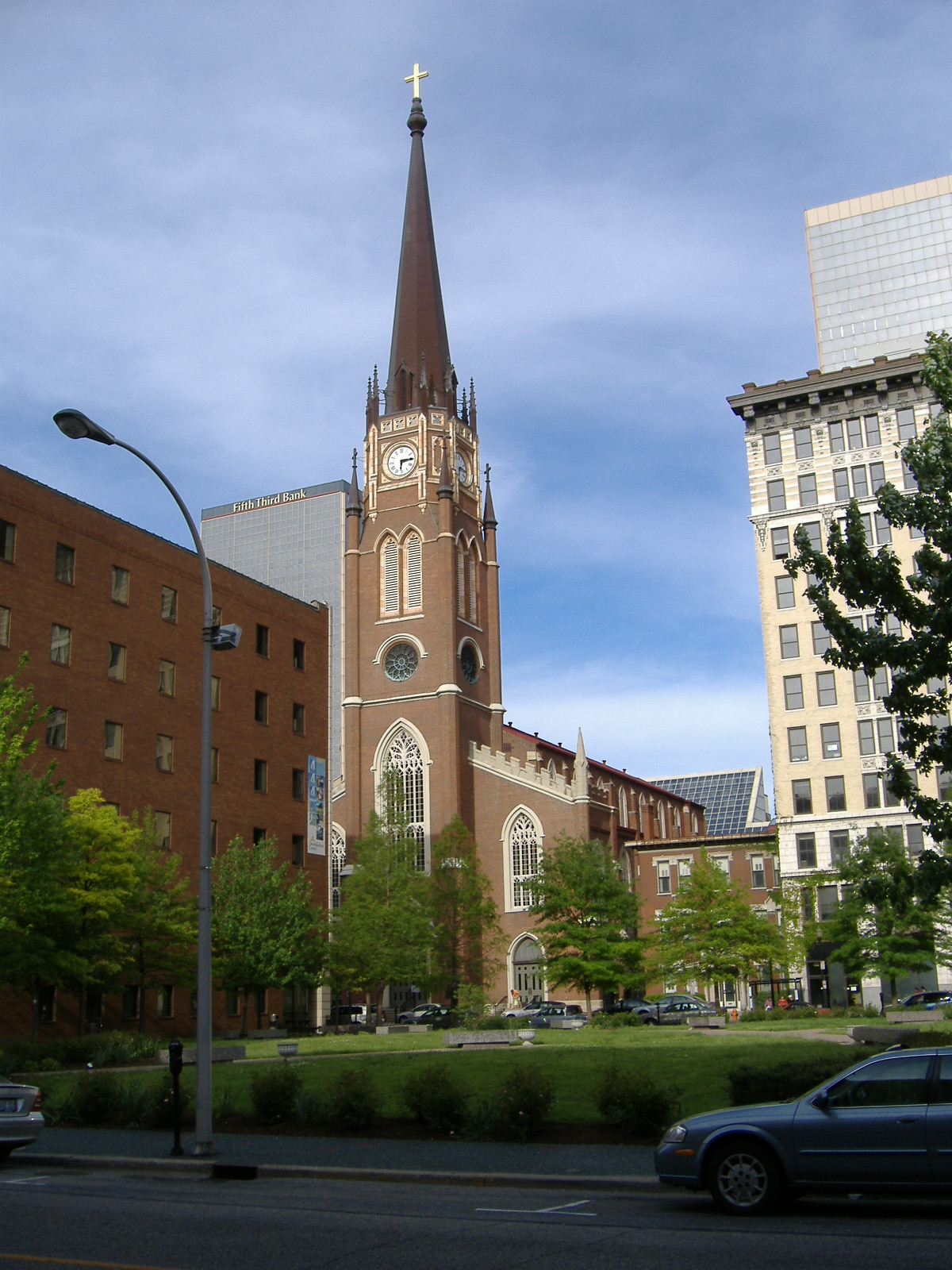
Cathedral of the Assumption, Louisville, Kentucky (2007)

Bloody Monday election riots of 1855, Louisville, Kentucky (1922)

After Chabrat resigned in 1847, the Vatican needed to appoint another coadjutor bishop for Flaget, who was too weak to conduct his duties. On April 18, 1848, Pope Pius IX appointed Spalding as coadjutor bishop of Louisville and titular bishop of Lengone. He received his episcopal consecration on September 1, 1848, from Flaget, with Bishops Francis Kenrick and Richard Miles serving as co-consecrators, at St. Louis Cathedral in Louisville. Francis Kenrick's brother, Archbishop Peter Kenrick, preached the homily for the service. Spalding selected as his episcopal motto: Auspice Maria (Latin: "Under the protection of Mary").

When Flaget died on February 11, 1850, Spalding automatically succeeded him as bishop of Louisville. At the time of Spalding's ascension, the diocese comprised the entire state of Kentucky and included over 30,000 Catholics, 43 churches, 10 chapels, and 40 priests.One of Spalding's first acts as bishop was to visit every parish, school, and other institution in the diocese. In 1850, with the assistance of a group of German-Catholics, Spalding opened St.Joseph's Orphanage for boys in Louisville.

Spalding completed construction of Cathedral of the Assumption in Louisville in 1852, with Archbishop John Baptist Purcell dedicating it in October 1852. That same year, he attended the first Plenary Council of Baltimore. The Council successfully petitioned the Holy See to divide the Diocese of Louisville, and the Diocese of Covington was erected in 1853, comprising the part of the state east of the Kentucky River. In order to address the shortage of clergy in his diocese, Spalding traveled Europe for a year and recruited the services of a number of priests and the Xaverian Brothers. During his visit to Belgium, he conceived the idea of establishing the American College at Louvain, which was later opened in 1857.

In August 1855, Spalding faced an anti-Catholic riot, known as Bloody Monday. Political opponents of the Democratic Party and supporters of the Know Nothing movement claimed that foreign-born Catholics intended to subvert the government, and Spalding himself was accused of harboring weapons in various churches. This led to a series of riots that resulted in the deaths of anywhere between 22 and over 100 German and Irish Catholic immigrants. The Cathedral of the Assumption, however, was spared from destruction by Mayor John Barbee, himself reportedly a member of the Know Nothing Party. Following the riots' end, Spalding wrote, "I entreat all to pause and reflect, to commit no violence, to believe no idle rumors, and to cultivate that peace and love which are characteristics of the religion of Christ." He played a leading role at the three provincial councils of Cincinnati in 1855, 1858, and 1861. He was also an outspoken advocate for the Catholic school system, denouncing public schools as "godless".

At the beginning of the American Civil War in 1860, Spalding ordered all churches in the diocese to pray for peace. Although he sought to avoid "angry political discussions", he published a piece on the war in L'Osservatore Romano that clearly demonstrated his sympathy laid with the Confederacy. He even secretly denounced Archbishop Purcell, a staunch supporter of the Union, to his superiors in Rome. He recognized slavery as "a great social evil", but asked, "But how can we free ourselves of [slavery] without ruining our country and causing injury to the poor slaves themselves?" He also remarked that "those who are in such a way liberated ordinarily become miserable vagabonds, drunkards and thieves."

In 1861, Spalding converted St. Joseph's College into a military hospital. By the end of Spalding's tenure in Louisville, the diocese included 70,000 Catholics and 85 churches.

=== Archbishop of Baltimore ===
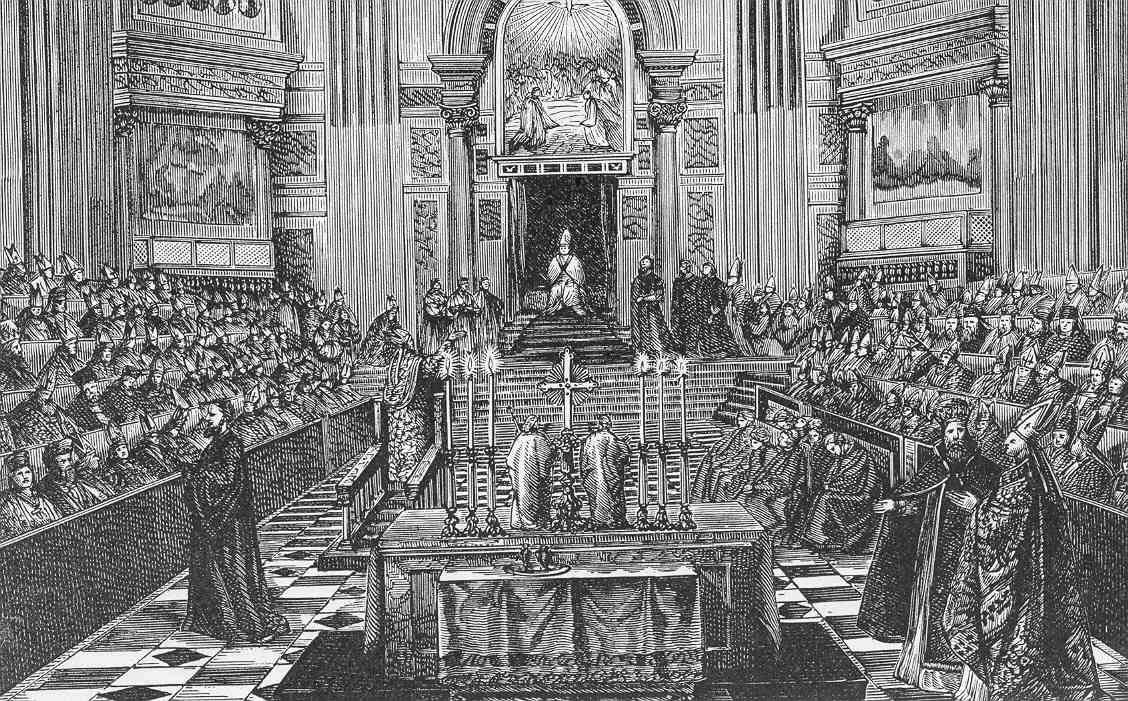
First Vatican Council, Rome (1873)

Following the death of Baltimore Archbishop Francis Kenrick on July 8, 1863, Pius IX named Spalding as the seventh archbishop of Baltimore on May 3, 1864. His installation took place at the Cathedral of the Assumption in Baltimore on July 31, 1863.

After founding the House of the Good Shepherd, Spalding conducted a visitation of the archdiocese, during which he administered Confirmation to 8,000 people. He established more parishes and institutions per year and introduced more religious orders than any other archbishop of Baltimore. He recruited priests from All Hallows College near Dublin and from the American College at Louvain. In 1865, Spalding organized the first group of the Society of Saint Vincent de Paul in Baltimore, based out of the cathedral, as well as the Association of St. Joseph, a society dedicated to the care of homeless girls.

Following the end of the civil war in 1865, Spalding appealed for financial aid to people in the former Confederacy, posing the question, "Can we be held blameless before God if our brethren, whom we are solemnly commanded to love even as ourselves, should perish through our coldness and neglect?" In response, the Catholics in the archdiocese donated $10,000 to relief efforts there. Spalding also expressed concern for the spiritual welfare of newly freed African-Americans. Writing to Archbishop John McCloskey, he said, "Four million of these unfortunates are thrown on our charity, and they silently but eloquently appeal to us for help." Spalding invited Revered Herbert Vaughan and the Mill Hill Fathers from England to minister exclusively among freedmen. In October 1866, Spalding presided over the Second Plenary Council of Baltimore.

In 1866, Spalding recruited four monks of the Xaverian Brothers from Belgium to found St. Mary's Industrial School, a facility for homeless boys.

In 1867, Spalding visited Rome to participate in the centenary celebration of the martyrdom of St. Peter. He returned to Rome in 1869 to attend the First Vatican Council, where he was a member of the Commission on Faith and of the Commission on Postulata. Exhausted from his visit to Rome, Spalding traveled to Savoy in France and Switzerland to regain his health. He expected to return to Rome when the Vatican Council reassembled. However, the capture of Rome by King Victor Emmanuel II in 1870, during the war for the unification of Italy, forced the canceling of the council. Spalding instead returned to Baltimore.

== Death and legacy ==
In late 1871, Spalding traveled to New York City to attend a meeting of bishops. After arriving back in Baltimore, he caught a severe cold that developed into an acute bronchitis. Suffering from fragile health all of his life, Spalding could not recover from this illness.

Spalding died in Baltimore on February 7, 1872, at age 61. He is buried in the crypt of the Basilica of the National Shrine of the Assumption of the Blessed Virgin Mary.

== Viewpoints ==
=== Slavery and civil war ===
Regarding slavery, the most controversial subject of his era, Spalding said that he sought to avoid "angry political discussions". However, he published a piece on the American Civil War in L'Osservatore Romano that showed his sympathy for the Confederate States. He even secretly denounced Archbishop John Purcell, a staunch supporter of the US federal government, to his superiors in Rome.

Though he received enslaved African Americans from his predecessor as archbishop in Louisville, Spalding recognized slavery as "a great social evil" but asked, "But how can we free ourselves of [slavery] without ruining our country and causing injury to the poor slaves themselves?" He also remarked that "those who are in such a way liberated ordinarily become miserable vagabonds, drunkards and thieves."

=== Papal infallibility ===
While he firmly believed in papal infallibility, Spalding initially considered that its dogmatic definition would be unnecessary and inexpedient. Instead, he favored an implicit over an explicit definition, as he believed the latter would likely "excite controversies now slumbering and almost extinct." However, Spalding reversed himself on the necessity of an explicit definition of infallibility after being drawn into a dispute with Bishop Félix Dupanloup and after the governments of France, Germany, Italy, and Spain joined in opposition to a definition. Spalding stated:

I should regard as the greatest misfortune of my life to have contributed in any way whatever to cause even a single one of my brothers to falter in perfect obedience to the authority of the Church.

Immediately after the final vote on infallibility, he addressed a pastoral letter to Baltimore, in which he explained the necessity of such a definition and attacked what he felt were numerous misrepresentations.

=== Freedom of worship ===
In 1865, Spalding issued a defense of Pius IX's Syllabus of Errors, which many Americans viewed as a condemnation of the basic principles of their system of government. For instance, Spalding declared:

Freedom of worship is condemned when it implies a right not given by Christ, and insists on the right of introducing false religion into a country where it does not exist. It is not only not censurable, but commendable, and the only thing practicable in countries like ours.

=== Social issues ===
Spalding condemned mixed marriages between Catholics and Protestants and called them "alliances so fraught with evil." He also condemned the participation of Catholics in Freemasonry and termed the brotherhood "a human substitute for a divine religion."

== Publications ==
- Sketches of the Life, Times, and Character of the Rt. Rev. Benedict Joseph Flaget (1852)
- Miscellanea (1855)
- History of the Protestant Reformation (1860)

== See also ==
- Catholic Church hierarchy
- Catholic Church in the United States
- Historical list of the Catholic bishops of the United States
- List of Catholic bishops of the United States
- Lists of patriarchs, archbishops, and bishops
- John Lancaster Spalding – Martin Spalding's nephew and biographer

Catholic Church titles
Preceded by Francis Patrick Kenrick	Archbishop of Baltimore; 1864–1872	Succeeded by James Roosevelt Bayley
Preceded by Benedict Joseph Flaget	Archbishop of Louisville; 1850–1864	Succeeded by Peter Joseph Lavialle
