= James Stephens Speed =

American politician

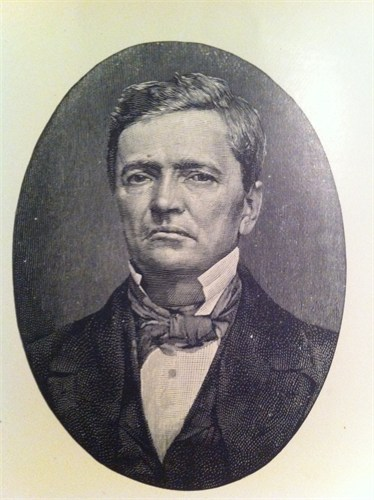

9th Mayor of Louisville
- In office April 26, 1852 – April 1855
- Preceded by: John M. Delph
- Succeeded by: John Barbee

Member of the Kentucky House of Representatives
- In office 1843

Personal details
- Born: February 14, 1811 Louisville, Kentucky, U.S.
- Died: August 7, 1860 (aged 49) Chicago, Illinois, U.S.

James Stephens Speed (February 14, 1811 – August 7, 1860) was the ninth Mayor of Louisville, Kentucky.

== Life ==
His father, John Speed, moved to Jefferson County in about 1795 and established a farm on Salt River Rd. (which became Dixie Highway), about 9 miles south of Louisville. James Speed moved to Louisville in his late teens and within a few years became a partner in a building and railroad contracting firm, Pickett and Speed.

He was elected to the Kentucky House of Representatives in 1843, and appointed a United States marshal by president Zachary Taylor in 1849. He was served as mayor of Louisville from April 26, 1852, to April 1855. The rules governing the office were confusing, and Speed was actually re-elected by popular vote each year of his term yet never awarded an election certificate. Speed argued that his original election meant his term lasted until 1856, but a resolution in 1855 called for a new election that year. The election was won by the Know-Nothing candidate, John Barbee. Speed did not run in the election and believed that he would remain mayor anyway, but Barbee was recognized as mayor by the city council, overriding Speed's veto. Speed appealed but ultimately lost at the Kentucky Supreme Court.

The Know-Nothings were inspired by editorials of the Louisville Daily Courier, which opposed Speed for his Catholicism (he was a Catholic convert for his marriage), a major local controversy of the time (Speed was the first Catholic mayor). In 1856 Speed moved to Chicago, where he spent the remainder of his life. As mayor, he was chiefly concerned with public works projects, such as the water works and street improvement. =

Speed died on August 7, 1860, in Chicago.

== Notes ==
Political offices
Preceded by John M. Delph	Mayor of Louisville, Kentucky; 1852–1855	Succeeded by John Barbee
