= Cathedral of the Assumption (Louisville, Kentucky) =

Historic church in Kentucky, United States

- U.S. National Register of Historic Places
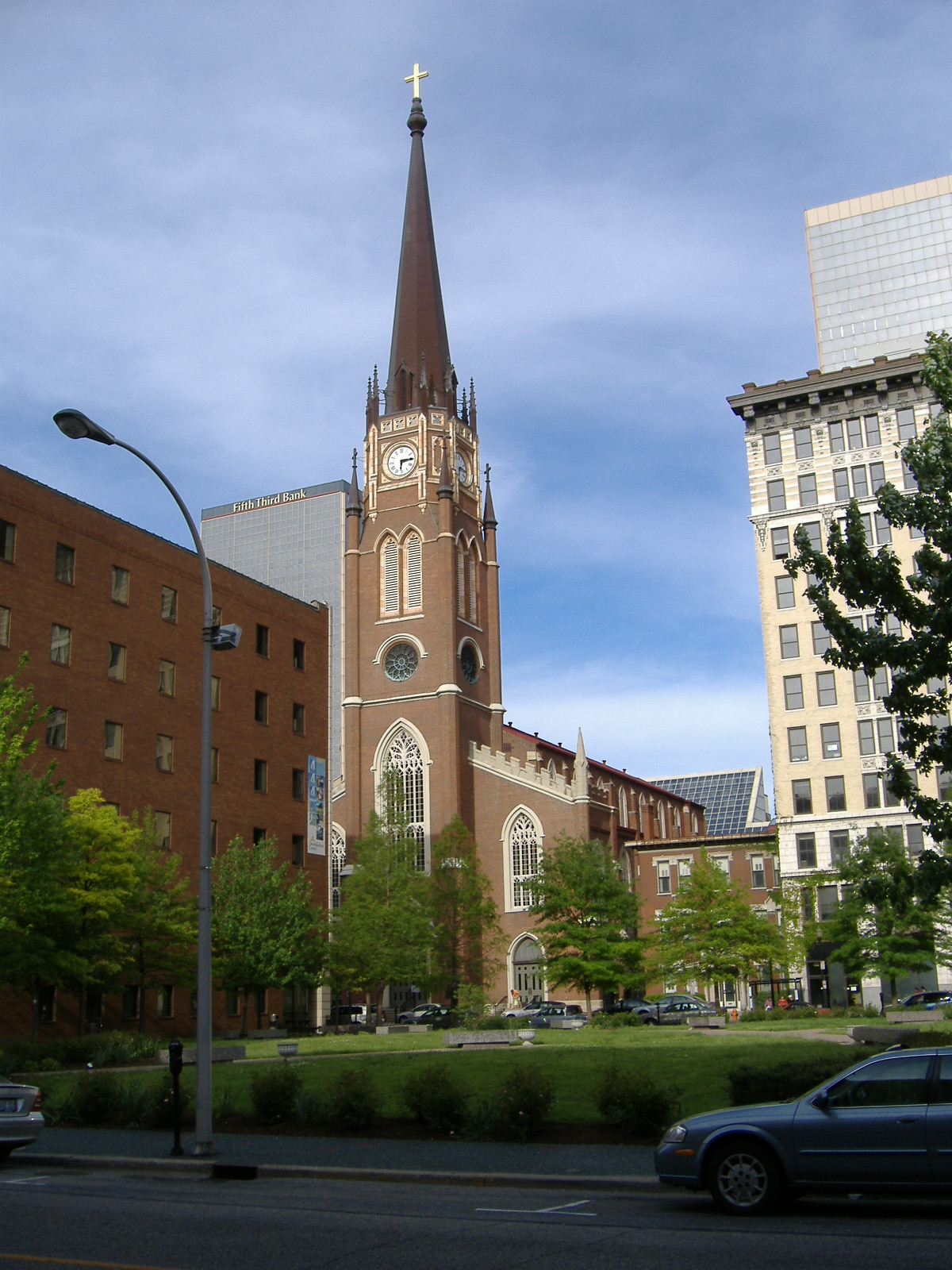
- Location: Louisville, Kentucky
- Coordinates: 38°15′6.61″N 85°45′30.65″W
- Built: 1852
- Architect: William Keely; D.X. Murphy & Bros
- Architectural style: Gothic Revival
- Website: cathedraloftheassumption.org
- NRHP reference No.: 77000623
- Added to NRHP: September 21, 1977

The Cathedral of the Assumption is a Catholic cathedral in Louisville, Kentucky, in the United States. It is the mother church of the Archdiocese of Louisville. As of 2025, it is the seat of Archbishop Shelton J. Fabre, and the Very Reverend Frederick W. Klotter serves as rector.

== History ==
=== St. Louis Church ===
The first Catholics arrived in present-day Kentucky in the 1770s from the Province of Maryland. They set up communities around Bardstown and its surrounding counties. Reverend Stephen Badin, the first priest ordained in the United States, periodically visited these communities while traveling west of the Alleghany Mountains.

Pope Pius VII in 1808 erected the Diocese of Bardstown, the only diocese in the interior of the United States. At that time, the diocese included most of Kentucky along with the future states of Tennessee, Missouri, Illinois, Indiana, Ohio and Michigan. The pope named Reverend Benedict Joseph Flaget as the first bishop of Bardstown.

In 1811, a small group of Catholics in Louisville formed Saint Louis Parish at 10th and Main Streets. The parish received its first resident pastor, Reverend Philip Hosten, in 1821. Hosten died one year later during an outbreak of yellow fever. By 1830, the parish had constructed a larger Saint Louis Church south of the Ohio River on Fifth Street. Over the coming decade, as the population grew in the American Midwest, the Vatican started subdividing the Diocese of Bardstown into other dioceses.

=== From Bardstown to Louisville ===
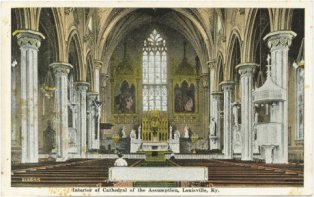
Nave, Cathedral of the Assumption (circa 1900)

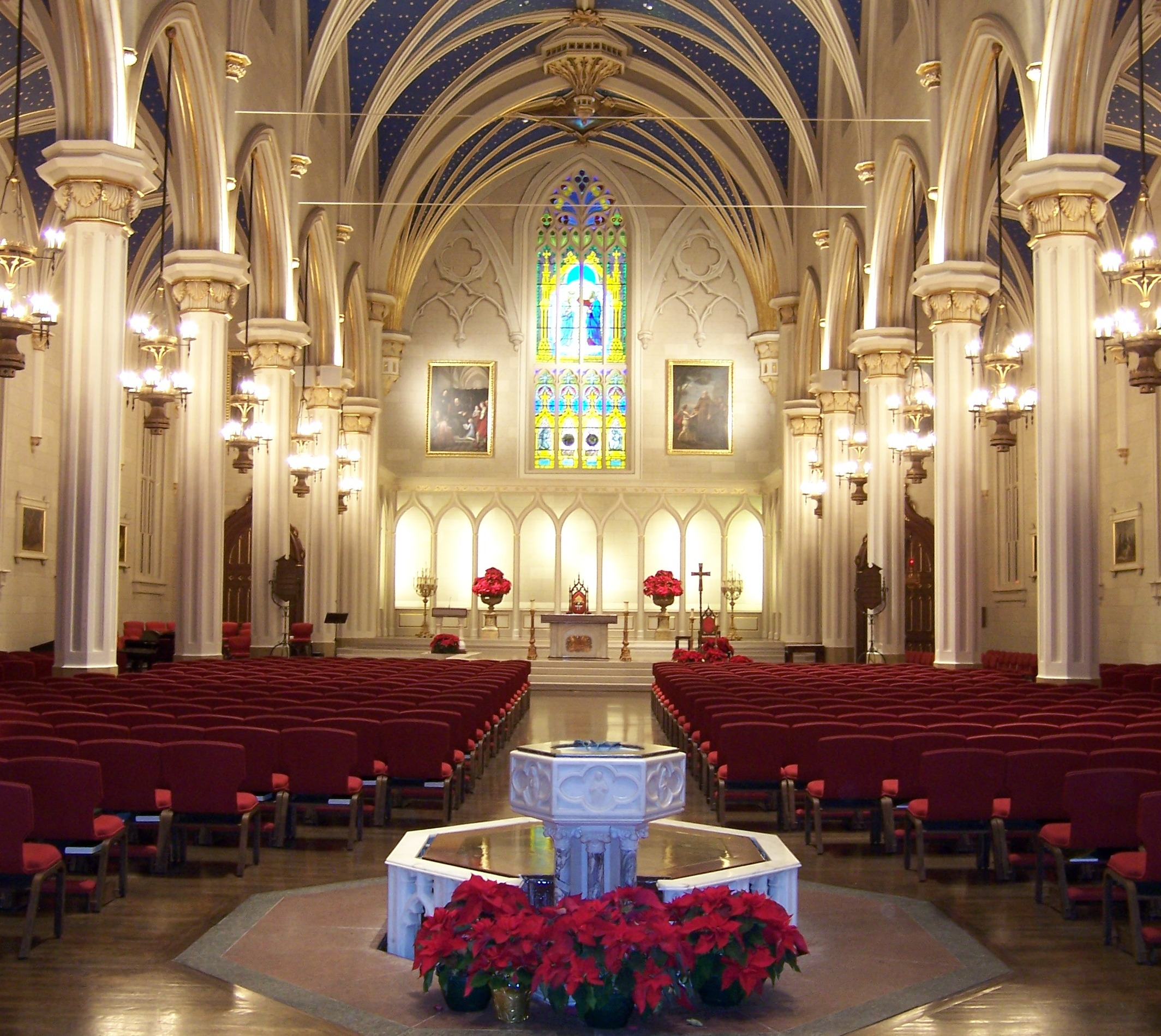
Nave and chancel, Cathedral of the Assumption (2006)

By 1841, Louisville had become much larger than Bardstown and it made sense to move the episcopal seat there. On February 13, 1841, Pope Gregory XVI suppressed the Diocese of Bardstown and erected the Diocese of Louisville in its place, with Flaget as bishop. Flaget designated St. Louis Church as St. Louis Cathedral. In 1849, Flaget decided that the current cathedral building was inadequate. His plan was to build a new, larger cathedral around the old cathedral, then dismantle it piece by piece and carry them out the front door.

The cornerstone for the new cathedral was laid in 1849. Flaget died in February 1850, leaving it to his successor, Bishop Martin John Spalding, to complete the project. On October 3, 1852, the new cathedral was dedicated to the Blessed Virgin Mary under the title of the Cathedral of the Assumption.

The Cathedral of the Assumption was nearly destroyed during Bloody Monday, a major anti-Catholic riot in August 1855. Members of the nativist Know Nothing Party attacked Irish and German immigrants, mainly Catholics, throughout Louisville, killing 22 of them. The rioters threatened to burn the cathedral, believing that it was hiding firearms in its basement. However, Louisville Mayor John Barbee, himself a Know-Nothing member, inspected the cathedral and said there were no weapons.

The archdiocese in 1858 replaced the cathedral spire, which had been damaged by fire. During the American Civil War of the early 1860s, the cathedral held memorial services for soldiers from the Confederate States Army as well as the Union Army. In 1912, the archdiocese installed 16 stained glass windows in the nave to replace the existing ones.

Louisville in December 1937 was ravaged by the Ohio River flood of 1937; during this disaster, the cathedral was opened as a shelter for those who had been displaced. Pope Pius XI in December 1937 elevated the Diocese of Louisville to the Archdiocese of Louisville. After the American entry into World War II in 1941, the cathedral parish donated its iron fence to a scrap metal drive to aid the war effort.

=== Renovation and revitalization ===
In 1985, the Cathedral Heritage Foundation was founded to raise funding for a major renovation of the cathedral. Renovation began in 1988 with the removal of sections of the cathedral spire, along with the finial and cross. In June 1991, after 100 years of disuse, the restored cathedral undercroft was reopened. In February 1993, renovation on the main cathedral space began, lasting for nearly two years. The cathedral was rededicated in May 1994, with a completely renovated cathedral space. That same month, Archbishop Kelly moved into the cathedral rectory, making him the first bishop to live in Downtown Louisville in 120 years.

In June 1998, the cathedral spire and bell tower were completely renovated. In November 2000, the Cathedral of the Assumption and St. Louis of France Cathedral Parish in Jérémie, Haiti, formed a sister parish relationship. In May 2005, renovations began on the cathedral school building, which now houses the cathedral parish office.

== Building ==
The cathedral complex houses the main cathedral building, with a eucharistic chapel in the rear, as well as the cathedral undercroft and St. Louis Hall, the Sandefur Dining Room for the homeless, the Patterson Education Center, the cathedral school building (housing the parish offices), and the rectory.

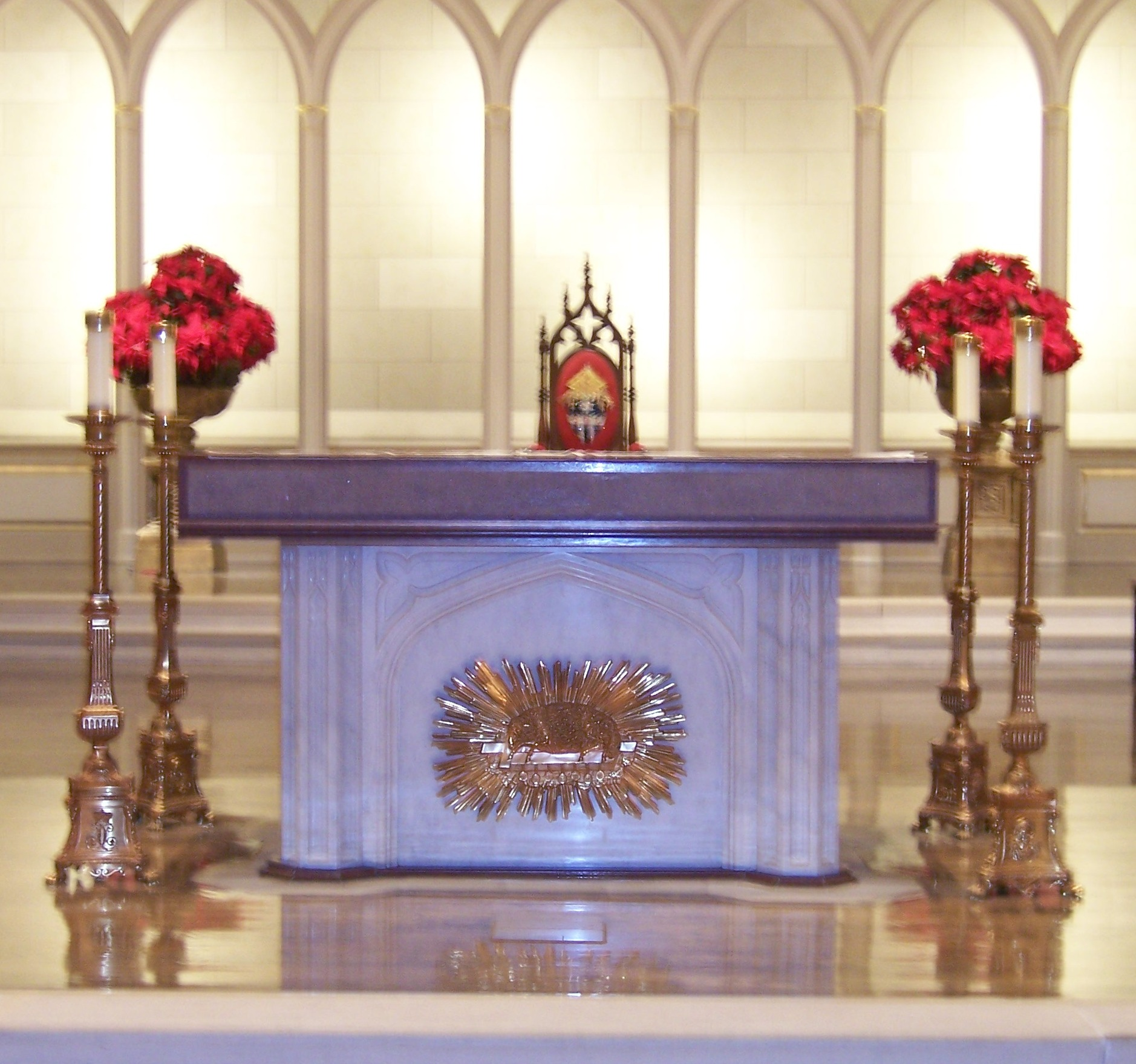
Altar, Cathedral of the Assumption (2006)

=== Altar ===
The altar incorporates a base of gray marble and a red granite table like the granite of the Baptismal pool. The gray marble was taken from the original high altar, which was removed from the back of the sanctuary in the renovation following Vatican II.

=== Baptistry ===
The baptistry is composed of pink granite and bronze metal; materials recycled from the original communion rail were used in the wall surrounded the baptism pool. The baptistry is located near the cathedral entrance to remind worshippers entering the building of their own baptisms.

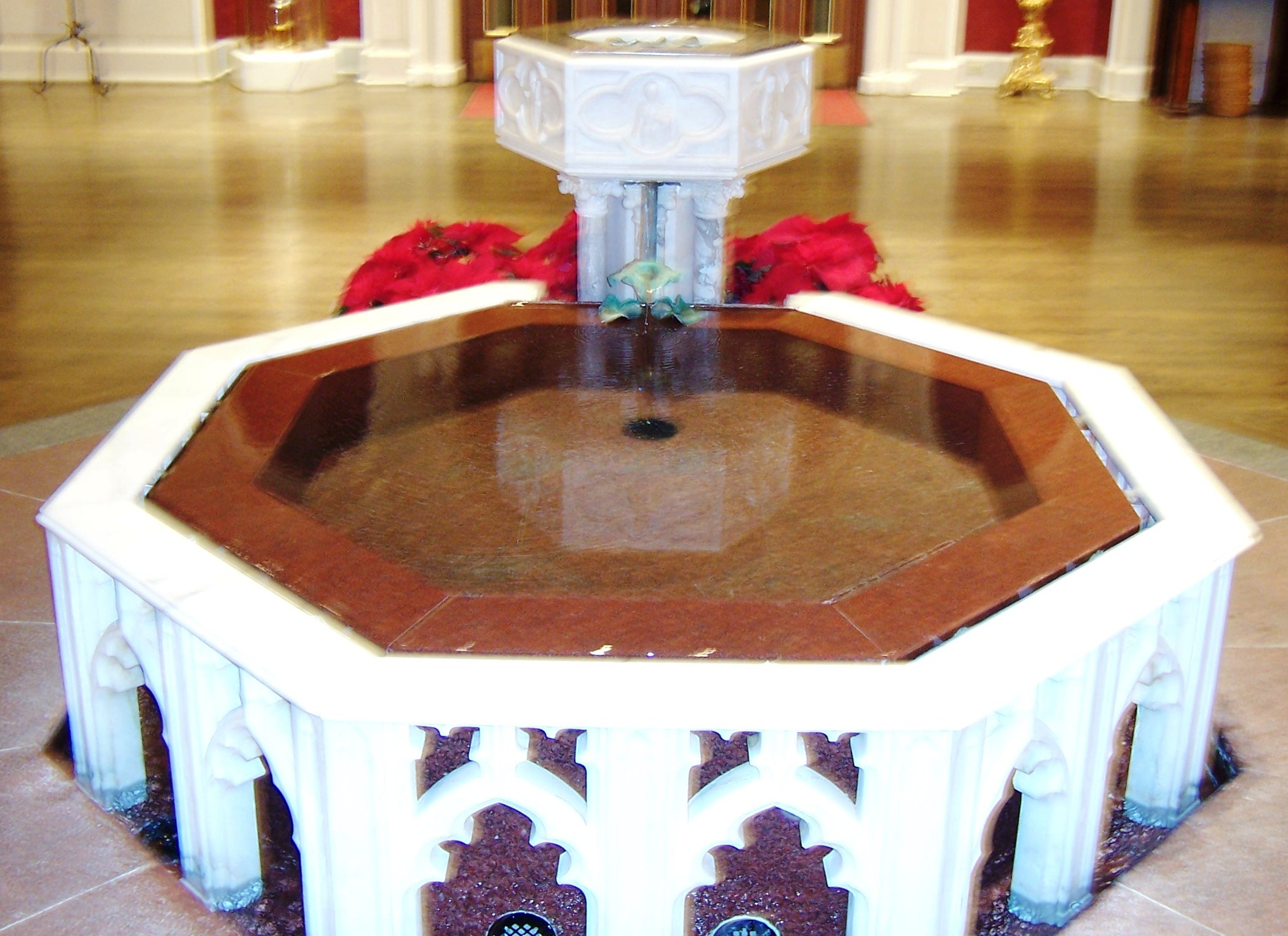
Baptistry, Cathedral of the Assumption (2006)

=== Bell tower ===
The bell tower for cathedral is 287 feet (87 m) high; when constructed in 1858, it was the tallest steeple in North America. It contains two small bells and one large bell. The large bell was a gift from Archbishop Pelagio Antonio de Labastida y Dávalos of the Archdiocese of Mexico City.

=== Cathedra and ambo ===
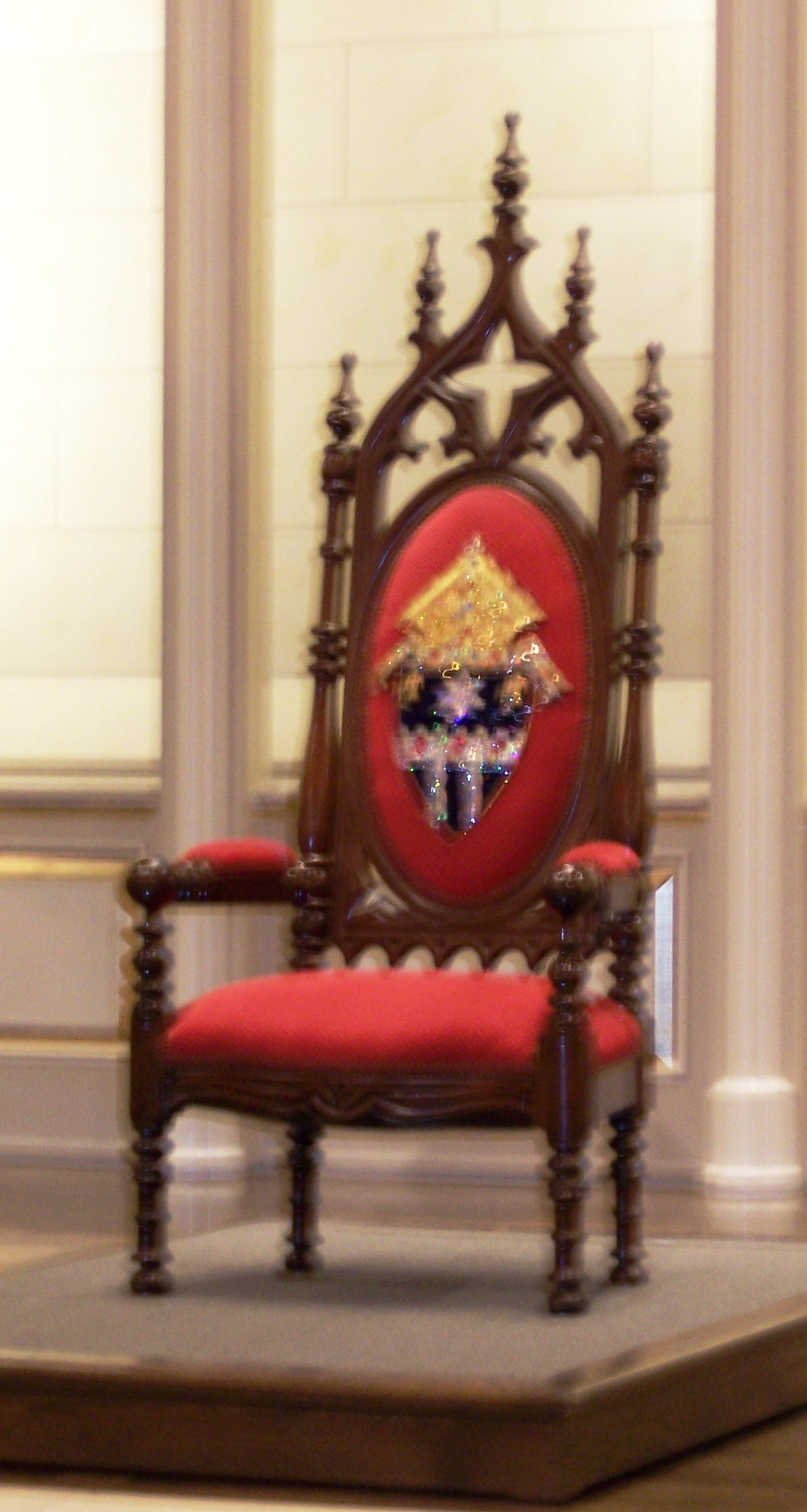
Cathedra, Cathedral of the Assumption (2006)

The cathedra is located behind the altar, is the official chair of the archbishop. It is an ancient symbol of the tradition and authority of the bishop in the life of the Church. The cathedra represents his three main offices of teaching, sanctifying and governing. The cathedra is upholstered in red suede, with the archdiocesan coat of arms on its back. The symbols on the coat of arms include:

- The fleur de lis, representing Louisville's French heritage
- A crozier
- A Star of David, an early symbol of the Virgin Mary
- A stockade and water flowing downward, representing Fort Nelson and the Ohio River
- Arrowheads representing the native peoples in this area

The Ambo, or pulpit, incorporates gray marble and red granite.

=== Coronation Window ===
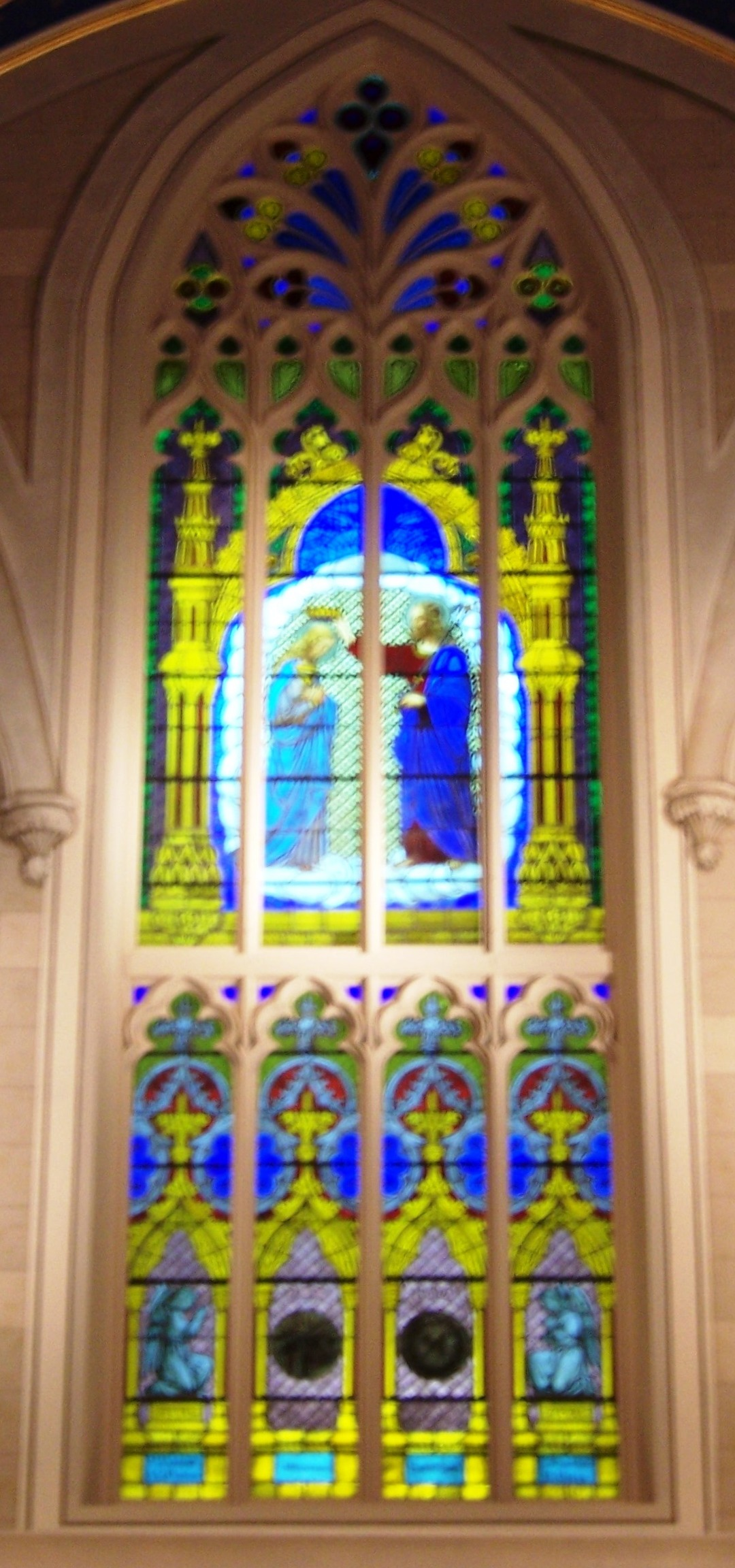
Coronation Window, Cathedral of the Assumption (2006)

The Coronation Window in the sanctuary was designed and installed by the Blum Art Company of Louisville in 1883 It depicts the crowning of the Virgin Mary as Queen of Heaven. It is considered one of the oldest and largest stained glass windows to be fabricated in the United States.

The window was removed from the sanctuary in 1912 and installed in the bell tower., had been moved to the front of the tower, with a new Assumption window replacing it. In 1994, the archdiocese removed the window and hired the Conrad Schmitt Studios in New Berlin, Wisconsin, to restore it. The Coronation Window was then reinstalled in its former location in the sanctuary.

=== Ceiling ===
The ceiling fresco depicts cherubs surrounding the Virgin Mary at the time of her assumption into heaven. When plaster from the fresco started falling on the floor of the nave in 1964, contractors patched it and then painted it over. It was rediscovered during renovations in 1994. The archdiocese removed the paint from the fresco and restored it.

The blue ceiling contains 8,000 gold leaf pointed stars. The ceiling ribs are gray and ivory, outlined in gold leaf. Two wooden engravings, or bosses, are located on the ceiling.

- One boss has the letters IHS, a Greek abbrieviation for Jesus Christ.
- The second boss reads Virgo Maria, Virgin Mary in Latin.

=== Nave ===
The nave, the body of the church, accommodates 966 people worshippers, utilizing individual chairs with kneelers. Usually arranged in straight rows facing the altar and allowing for a center aisle and two side aisles, the chairs may also be placed in rows the length of the church, facing each other across the center aisle. The nave walls are faux finished to resemble limestone blocks. The floor is white oak tongue-in-groove planking.

During the 1994 renovation, engineers discovered that the building was cracked down the middle and in danger of collapse. To resolve this, they mounted steel strand beams from wall to wall in the nave to provide a counter push and pull action.

=== Pipe organ and gallery ===
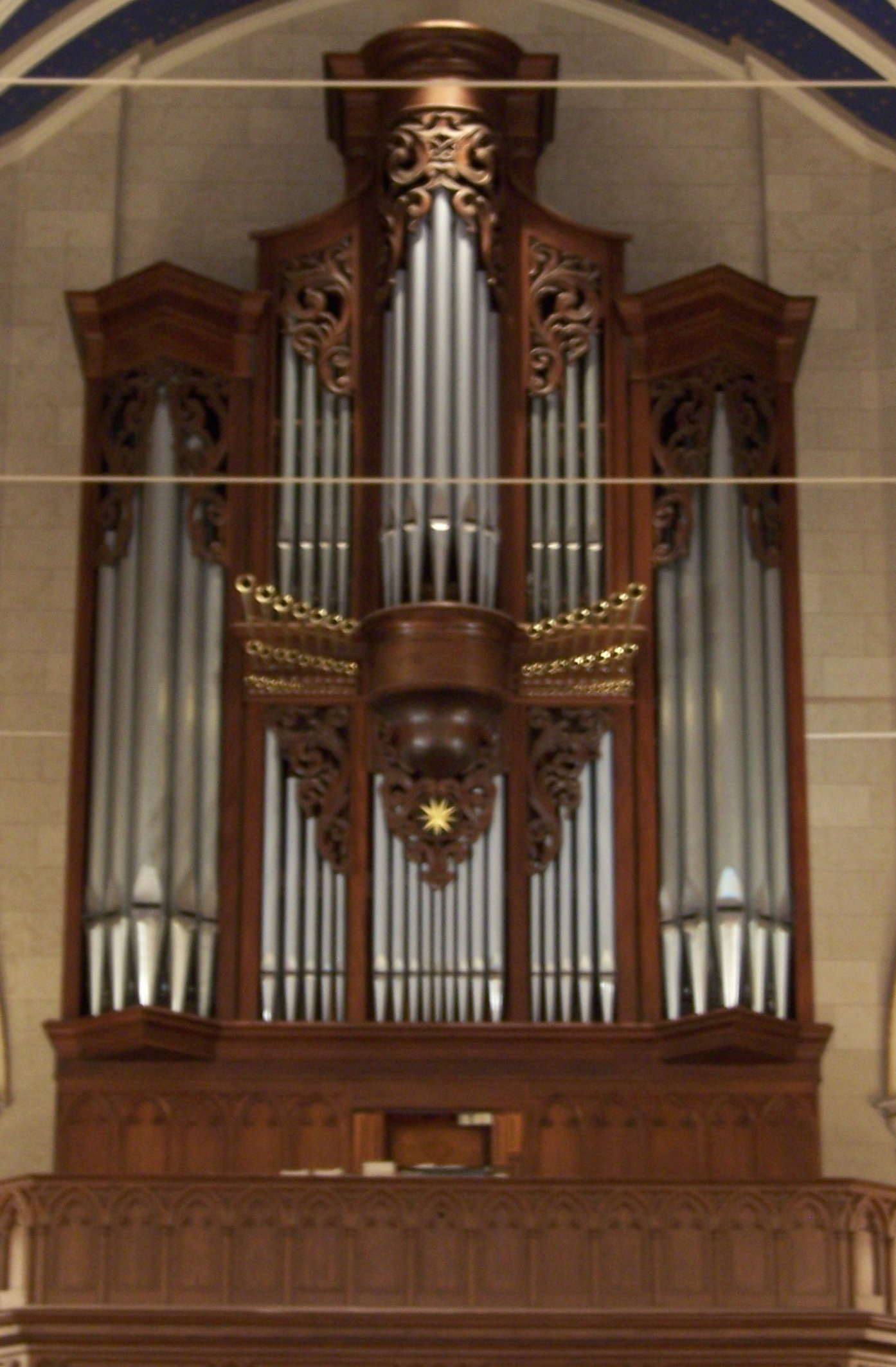
Pipe organ, Cathedral of the Assumption (2006)

The pipe organ was built by Steiner-Reck, Inc., of Louisville in 1983. The organ features three manuals and forty-three ranks. Fanfare trumpets were added in 1994, along with both 32-foot ranks, full MIDI capability, and a Gothic casework of hand-carved mahogany.

The center section of the loft railing is original, featuring small pointed arches with a reproduction of the design on the side sections. The gallery was originally divided into two sections, one for children, the other for enslaved people.

== Community assistance ==
=== Social programs ===
The Cathedral of the Assumption sponsors a number of social projects to assist the poor, the hungry and other disadvantaged individuals.

==== Daily Lunch Program ====
This program started in 1930 with the parish providing cheese sandwiches to the hungry from the rectory. The program later provided bologna sandwiches from the garage. In 2002, the Sandefur Dining Hall opened, which now serves a full meal to approximately 140 clients per day.

==== State ID Voucher Program ====
Volunteers assists clients in obtaining state IDs, which they need for admittance to homeless shelters, job applications and other assistance.

==== Pet Food Pantry ====
Distributes donated pet food to individuals with pets who are visiting the Sandefur Dining Hall.

==== Special Collections ====
The parish staff sponsors different collections during the year. Examples include winter gear for the homeless, school supplies for the sister parish in Haiti, baby items for new mothers

=== Music ===
==== Cathedral Choir ====
The cathedral choir has 45 volunteer voices and four employee section leaders. Its Their repertoire includes early chant through the Renaissance, Baroque, Classical, Romantic, and 20th-century periods music. It has performed with the Louisville Orchestra and toured in Italy, Ireland, England, France, Germany and Austria. It has made two recordings.

The cathedral choirs have made three European tours, most recently in 2004 touring England and Ireland, singing at Killarney Cathedral, Gloucester Cathedral, and St. Martin-in-the-Fields under the direction of Dr. Phillip Brisson, director of music for the cathedral. The choirs have recorded two compact disks, and a third disk of their most recent international tour repertoire is in the planning stage. The cathedral choirs have also performed many times with the Louisville Orchestra.

==== Cathedral Schola ====
The Cathedral Schola is an ensemble group that is either a quartet or an octet. This group performs unison chant, early chant polyphony, or Renaissance and Baroque compositions.

== See also ==
- Basilica of St. Joseph Proto-Cathedral
- List of Catholic cathedrals in the United States
- List of cathedrals in the United States
- List of attractions and events in the Louisville metropolitan area
- National Register of Historic Places listings in Downtown Louisville, Kentucky
- Religion in Louisville, Kentucky
