= John Barbee =

American mayor

10th Mayor of Louisville
- In office 1855–1857
- Preceded by: James S. Speed
- Succeeded by: William S. Pilcher

Personal details
- Born: September 16, 1815; Pewee Valley, Kentucky, U.S.
- Died: December 22, 1888 (aged 73)
- Resting place: Cave Hill Cemetery; Louisville, Kentucky, U.S.
- Political party: Know Nothing; Democratic
- Children: Alice Barbee Castleman

John Barbee (September 16, 1815 – December 22, 1888) was the tenth mayor of Louisville, Kentucky, from 1855 to 1857, chiefly remembered for his part in the anti-immigrant riots known as "Bloody Monday".

== Life ==
He was born in Pewee Valley, Kentucky, and, after his parents died, moved to Louisville at age 14. In 1841, he was elected by the city council as a collector of revenues, and after a brief foray back into the private sector, he was elected to the city council in 1849 and 1851. In 1855, as a member of the anti-Catholic, anti-foreigner Know Nothing party, he was elected mayor over James S. Speed, who did not run for re-election, believing the election was invalid, but his appeal was denied eventually by the Kentucky Supreme Court.

== Bloody Monday ==
The most notable event of his term was "Bloody Monday", an uprising against (mostly Catholic) German and Irish immigrants on August 6, 1855. The day was election day, and despite the likelihood of riots, Barbee would not provide any security at voting booths. Know-Nothings prevented naturalized German and Irish from voting, and riots erupted on the streets of the Butchertown district of Louisville. Germans were beaten and some were killed as the riots spilled into the Irish-dominated Eighth Ward, burning a large row of houses (Quinn's Row). Barbee finally intervened to prevent rioters from destroying the city's Catholic cathedral. Officially, 22 people were killed in the riots, although some sources place the number of deaths at 100 or more.

After Barbee's term as mayor, he served again on the city council from 1858 to 1861. He became a Democrat after the Civil War. He is buried in Cave Hill Cemetery.

Political offices
Preceded by James S. Speed	Mayor of Louisville, Kentucky; 1855–1857	Succeeded by William S. Pilcher
