= Henry C. Magruder =

Confederate guerrilla and war criminal

Henry Clay Magruder
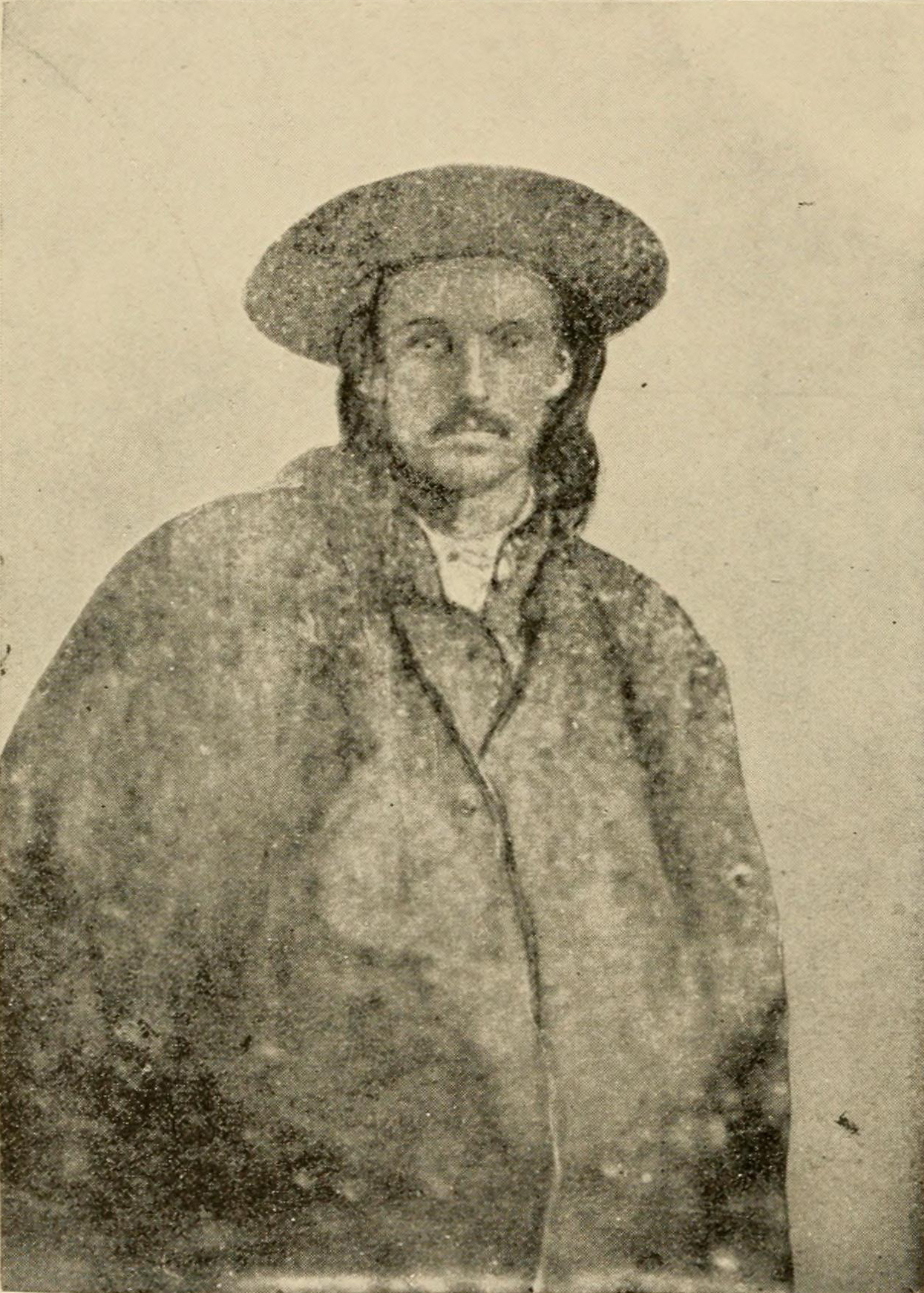
- Born: 1843; Lebanon, Kentucky, U.S. (nearby)
- Died: October 20, 1865 (aged 22); Louisville Military Prison, Kentucky, U.S.
- Known for: Confederate guerrilla fighter and war criminal
- Status: Executed by hanging
- Convictions: Acting as a guerrilla Murder (8 counts)
- Penalty: Death

Henry Clay Magruder (1843 – October 20, 1865) was a Confederate soldier, convicted war criminal, and guerrilla during the American Civil War. Born near Lebanon junction, Kentucky, he took part in several major Western theater battles. Still, he is best known for his fate as a guerrilla and was possibly the inspiration of a fictional local folk hero and guerrilla fighter, Sue Munday, whose exploits closely mirrored his own.

== Army career ==
Magruder enlisted in the Confederate States Army at age 17 and served under General Simon Bolivar Buckner at the Battle of Fort Donelson. Magruder was captured when Buckner chose to surrender the fort rather than allow his men to fight their way out, but he soon escaped. Magruder joined the personal bodyguard of Confederate General Albert Sidney Johnston, serving under him at the Battle of Shiloh. Following General Johnston's death, Magruder transferred to General John Hunt Morgan's Kentucky Cavalry. He took part in Morgan's raid into Ohio and Indiana and once again escaped capture. He eventually crossed the Ohio River back into Kentucky.

== Guerrilla fighter ==
Magruder, now well behind U.S. lines, located other escaped Confederates and led them in raids against U.S. military targets south of Louisville. As historian Walter L. Hixson notes, "Magruder also plundered Union homes, burned alive a black man and violated southern sex codes by raping the wife of a Union soldier and six other 'young ladies' at a school."

On January 23, 1865, some 80 Black troops of Company E, 5th United States Colored Cavalry Regiment, under Command of 2nd Lieutenant Augustus Flint, were assigned to move almost a thousand head of cattle from Camp Nelson to the stock yard at Louisville, Kentucky. The men were assigned mostly to the front and rear of the spread-out herd of cattle. About 41 men were bringing up the rear on 25 January near Simpsonville, when they were ambushed by Confederate guerrillas, which were led by Magruder. Few of the Union troops were able to fire their muzzle-loaded Enfield infantry rifles, due to fouled powder. The guerrillas were armed with 6-shot revolvers and most carried two or more. As Confederates quickly closed the distance, almost all of the Black soldiers bringing up the rear were wounded or dismounted. Only two escaped harm, one by playing dead and the other hiding under an overturned wagon box. The forward group panicked and fled. About an hour after the ambush, local citizens found 15 dead and 20 wounded soldiers on and near the road. Four more soldiers were later found dead of wounds or of exposure nearby. The men of Simpsonville took 20 wounded men back to town; 8 of the men so severely wounded they were not expected to live. A total of six soldiers died en route or in Louisville. It was later determined that some of the Union soldiers had been murdered trying to surrender or after being disarmed. The remainder of the Union wounded were left to die in the freezing cold. Three soldiers remained missing in the final accounting.

Pro-U.S. home guards captured and arrested most of Magruder's small band after they robbed a bank in February 1865. Magruder and two others avoided capture for several weeks, but the three were eventually cornered in a barn and forced to surrender. Magruder had been seriously wounded, shot in the arm and back and then shot in the lungs during capture.

One of the men captured with Magruder was Marcellus Jerome Clarke. Clarke was quickly charged with being a guerrilla, convicted by a closed military tribunal, and hanged in March 1865. Magruder, however, was allowed to recover his health in jail before he was arraigned.

== Published exploits ==
Before this, Louisville, Kentucky publisher George D. Prentice had written a series of articles about the area's ongoing guerrilla activities in his Louisville Journal, but attributed it to activities of a "Sue Munday." These tales closely paralleled Clarke's and Magruder's actions. By some accounts, including his own posthumous memoir Three Years in the Saddle: The Life and Confession of Henry Magruder: The Original Sue Munday, The Scourge of Kentucky (1865), Magruder was the original inspiration for the fictitious Confederate guerrilla fighter.

== Trial and execution ==
In September 1865, a military tribunal tried Magruder for acting as a guerrilla fighter, 17 counts of murder, wounding with intent to kill, and war rape. He was found guilty of 8 murders and acting as a guerrilla fighter. Magruder was sentenced to death. After his sentence was approved, he was hanged at the Louisville Military Prison on October 20, 1865. While on death row, he converted to Catholicism. He confessed to a priest that he had done bad things. As Magruder was escorted from his cell for his execution, he remarked, "It is hard, but maybe it is fair."
