= Marcellus Jerome Clarke =

Confederate captain and guerilla fighter

- Marcellus Jerome Clarke as a Confederate soldier
- Born: August 25, 1844; Franklin, Kentucky, U.S.
- Died: March 15, 1865 (aged 20); Louisville, Kentucky, U.S.
- Cause of death: Execution by hanging
- Military career
- Allegiance: Confederate States of America
- Branch: Confederate States Army
- Service years: 1861–1865
- Rank: Captain
- Nickname: Sue Mundy/Sue Munday
- Units: Company B, 4th Kentucky Infantry; 1st Kentucky "Orphan" Brigade

Marcellus Jerome Clarke (also called M. Jerome Clarke) (August 25, 1844 – March 15, 1865) was a Confederate captain who in 1864 became one of Kentucky's most famous guerrillas. He was rumored to be "Sue Mundy", a character publicized by George Prentice, editor of the Louisville Journal.

== Confederate soldier ==
Marcellus Jerome Clarke was born in Franklin, Kentucky, in 1844. At age 17 in 1861 he enlisted as M. Jerome Clarke in the 4th Kentucky Infantry, 1st Kentucky "Orphan" Brigade, Confederate States Army (CSA). While with the 4th Kentucky Clarke was captured at Fort Donelson and later escaped from Camp Morton. He saw action with the 4th Kentucky at the Battle of Chickamauga.

Clarke was reassigned to Morgan's Men, the unit headed by Brig. Gen. John Hunt Morgan. By then Clarke was a captain. While with Morgan's Men, he took part in Morgan's last raid through Kentucky in the summer of 1864.

== Confederate guerrilla ==
Following Morgan's death on September 4, 1864, Clarke formed his own guerrilla band and returned to Kentucky in October. He raided throughout the state, killing Union soldiers and destroying supplies. His raids seemed to inspire the Louisville Journal's stories of the infamous "Sue Mundy", and caused Maj. Gen. Stephen G. Burbridge, military governor of Kentucky, substantial embarrassment. Combined with the fact that Clarke's gang (referred to by the Journal as "Mundy's Gang") had joined with Quantrill's Raiders, Clarke was seen as a dangerous enemy of the Union. On the night of February 2, 1865, this joint force of Quantrill and Clarke rode into Lair Station, Kentucky, and burned the railroad depot and freight cars. A week later on February 8, 1865, the guerrillas killed three soldiers, took four more prisoner and destroyed the remnants of a wagon train.

== Capture and hanging ==
On March 12, 1865, 50 Union soldiers from the 30th Wisconsin Infantry, under the command of Maj. Cyrus Wilson, who were tasked with capturing Clarke and his gang, surrounded a tobacco barn ten miles south of Brandenburg near Breckinridge County. Four Union soldiers were wounded in the ensuing altercation, but Clarke was captured. With him were Henry Medkiff and Henry C. Magruder, wounded in an earlier attack.

Maj. Wilson escorted the three men to Brandenburg, where they boarded a steamer for Louisville. Military authorities kept Clarke's trial a secret, and the verdict had been decided the day before the trial. He pleaded to be treated as a prisoner of war but was tried as a guerrilla. On March 14, military authorities planned Clarke's execution, even though the trial had not started. At the brief hearing Clarke was said to have "stood firm and spoke with perfect composure." Clarke stated that he was a regular Confederate soldier and that the crimes he was being charged with he had not committed, or they had been committed by Quantrill. During the three-hour trial Clarke was not allowed counsel or witnesses for his defense. Three days after his capture Union authorities scheduled Clarke for public hanging just west of the corner of 18th and Broadway in Louisville.

On March 15, Rev. J.J. Talbott visited the 20-year-old Clarke in prison and notified him that he would be hanged that afternoon. Reportedly Clarke knelt and prayed, asking Talbott to baptize him. With Clarke dictating, the minister wrote four letters for him: to Clarke's aunt, his cousin, a young lady named Elizabeth Lashbrook- his brother John Thomas Clarke's wife, and to his fiancée. Clarke's last requests were for his body to be sent to his aunt and stepmother in Franklin to be buried in his Confederate uniform, next to his parents.

When the carriage arrived at the gallows, Clarke gave one last statement to the crowd. He said: "I am a regular Confederate soldier-not a guer[r]illa . . . I have served in the Army for nearly four years . . . I fought under General Buckner at Fort Donelson and I belonged to General Morgan's command when I entered Kentucky." His last words were: "I believe in and die for the Confederate cause." Several thousand people were estimated to have attended Clarke's execution, attracted by rumors that he was "Sue Mundy". After authorities cut Clarke's body down from the scaffold, some witnesses cut off buttons from his coat as keepsakes. Police arrested three men for fighting over his hat.

On October 29, 1865, Union authorities hanged Henry Magruder behind the walls of the Louisville Military Prison. He had been allowed to heal from his wounds before being hanged. Before his death Magruder wrote his memoir and declared he was the real "Sue Mundy". Thus ended the careers of two famous Kentucky guerrillas.

== See also ==
- Louisville in the American Civil War
