= Sue Mundy =

Character created by George D. Prentice

Sue Mundy was a fictional guerrilla character created by George D. Prentice, the editor of the Louisville Journal. Prentice opposed the heavy-handed military rule of General Stephen G. Burbridge in Kentucky during the American Civil War.

== History ==
Union Major General Stephen G. Burbridge was given command over the Commonwealth of Kentucky in June 1864, after the state's Unionist population had suffered numerous guerrilla raids and murders. He declared martial law.

Prentice created the "Sue Mundy" persona to portray Burbridge as an incompetent commander, unable to protect Kentucky citizens. Guerrilla groups operated in Kentucky late in 1864 and in 1865 (as they did in neighboring Tennessee). Most were bandits, part of a breakdown in social order during the war, and they preyed on persons affiliated with either side for their own gang. Some claimed to be part of "Sue Mundy's gang" because of the popular image and instant notoriety. Prentice published articles about guerrilla terrorism in the Louisville Journal, attributing it to activities of "Sue Mundy". He emphasized what he considered the incompetence of Burbridge to protect residents of the area.

In the first editorial Prentice wrote about the figure, he spelled her name 'Munday', but in every other editorial he spelled the name 'Mundy'. He portrayed her as a guerrilla.

The 20-year-old guerrilla Marcellus Jerome Clarke, a Confederate captain, was known to wear his hair long and had smooth-faced features. Some thought or alleged that he was the model for or actually "Sue Mundy." Caught by Federal soldiers in Meade County on March 12, 1865, Clarke was tried in Louisville and hanged a few days later. All along, Prentice vehemently denied that Clarke was Mundy.

By some accounts, including his own, Henry C. Magruder (another guerrilla riding with Clarke) was the original Sue Mundy. Magruder made this claim in his posthumous memoir, Three Years in the Saddle: The Life and Confession of Henry Magruder: The Original Sue Munday, The Scourge of Kentucky (1865). The gang of guerrillas were captured and arrested after robbing a bank. As noted above, Clarke was convicted and executed by hanging soon after capture in March 1865. Magruder, having been shot in the lungs during capture, was allowed to recover his health in jail before he was hanged.

== See also ==
- Louisville in the American Civil War
