= Guerrilla warfare in the American Civil War =

Irregular warfare in the American Civil War

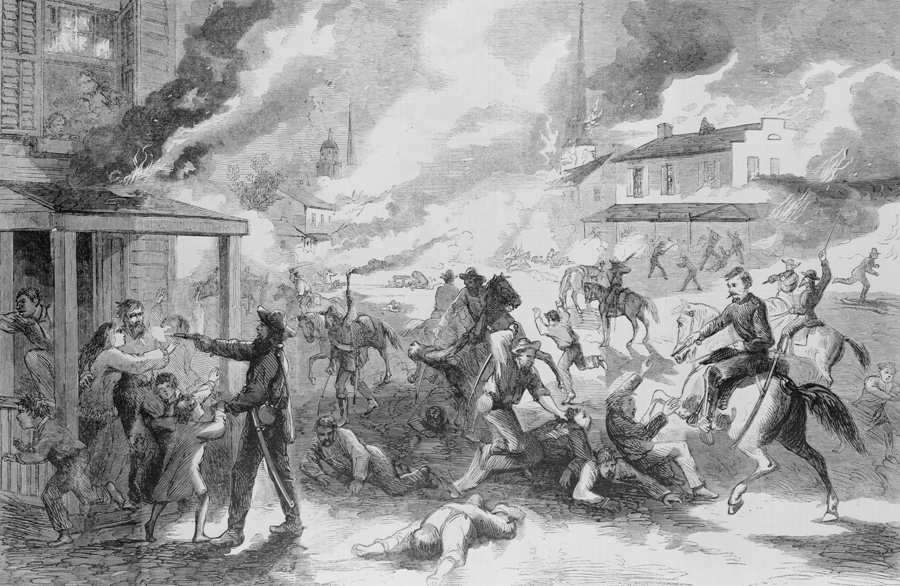
“The destruction of the city of Lawrence, Kansas, and the massacre of its inhabitants by the Rebel guerrillas,” illustration for Harper's Weekly, 1863.

Guerrilla warfare was waged during the American Civil War (1861–1865) by both sides of the conflict, but most notoriously by the Confederacy. It gathered in intensity as the war dragged.

== Background ==
Guerrilla warfare in the American Civil War followed the same general patterns of irregular warfare conducted in 19th century Europe. Structurally, they can be divided into three different types of operations: the so-called 'people's war', 'partisan warfare', and 'raiding warfare'. Each had distinct characteristics that were common practice during the war.

== History of operations ==
=== People's war ===
The concept of a 'people's war,' first described by Clausewitz in his classic treatise On War, was the closest example of a mass guerrilla movement in the 19th century. In general during the American Civil War, this type of irregular warfare was conducted in the hinterland of the border states (Missouri, Arkansas, Tennessee, Kentucky, and northwestern Virginia / West Virginia). It was marked by a vicious quality of neighbors fighting each other as other grudges got settled. It was frequent for residents of one part of a single county to take up arms against their counterparts in the rest of the vicinity. Bushwhacking, murder, assault, and terrorism were characteristics of this kind of fighting. Few participants wore uniforms or were formally mustered into the actual armies. In many cases, civilians fought against civilians or civilians fought against opposing enemy troops.

=== Partisan warfare ===
Partisan warfare, in contrast, more closely resembled commando operations of the 20th century. Partisans were small units of conventional forces, controlled and organized by a military force for operations behind enemy lines. The 1862 Partisan Ranger Act, passed by the Confederate Congress, authorized the formation of such units and gave them legitimacy, which placed them in a different category from the common 'bushwhacker' or 'guerrilla'. John Singleton Mosby formed a partisan unit (the 43rd Battalion) that was very effective in tying down Union forces behind their lines in northern Virginia in the last two years of the war. Groups such as Blazer's Scouts, White's Comanches, the Loudoun Rangers, McNeill's Rangers, and other similar forces at times served in the formal armies, but they often were loosely organized and operated more as partisans than as cavalry, especially early in the war.

=== Raiding warfare ===
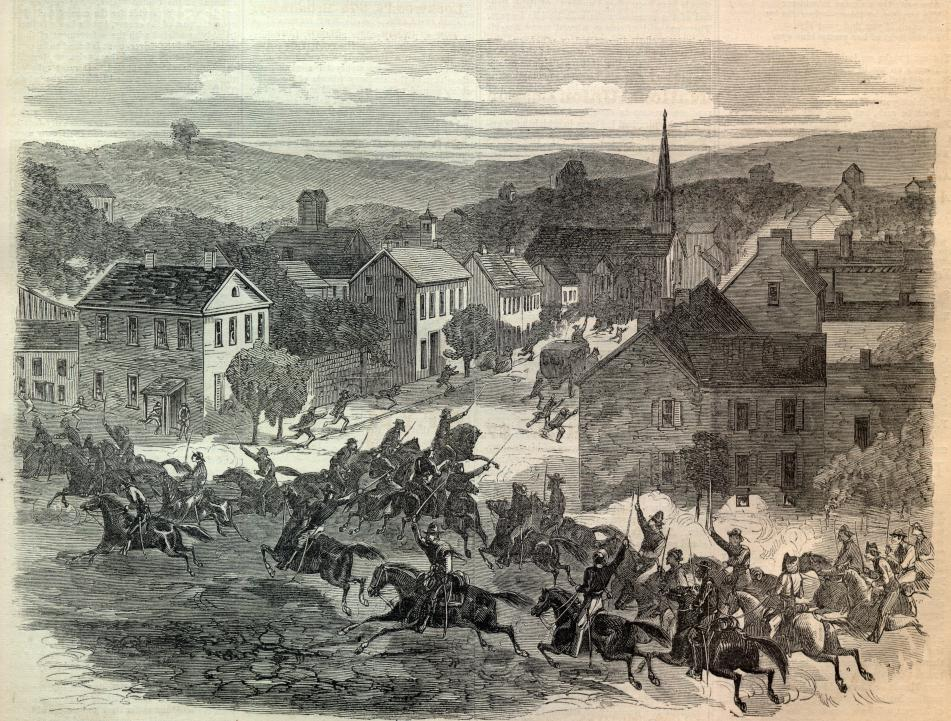
“Morgan's Raiders enter Washington, Ohio,” illustration for Harper's Weekly, 1863.

Lastly, deep raids by conventional cavalry forces were often considered 'irregular' in nature. The "Partisan Brigades" of Nathan Bedford Forrest and John Hunt Morgan operated as part of the cavalry forces of the Confederate Army of Tennessee in 1862 and 1863. They were given specific missions to destroy logistical hubs, railroad bridges, and other strategic targets to support the greater mission of the Army of Tennessee. Morgan led raids into Kentucky as well. In his last raid, he violated orders by going across the Ohio River and raiding in Ohio and Indiana as well since he wanted to bring the war to the North. The long raid diverted thousands of Union troops. Morgan captured and paroled nearly 6,000 troops, destroyed bridges and fortifications, and ran off livestock. By mid-1863, Morgan's Raiders had been mostly destroyed in the late days of the Great Raid of 1863.

Some of his followers continued under their own direction, such as Marcellus Jerome Clarke, who kept on with raids in Kentucky. The Confederacy conducted few deep cavalry raids in the latter years of the war, mostly because of the losses in experienced horsemen and the offensive operations of the Union Army. Federal cavalry conducted several successful raids during the war but in general used their cavalry forces in a more conventional role. A notable exception was the 1863 Grierson's Raid, which did much to set the stage for General Ulysses S. Grant's victory during the Vicksburg Campaign.

=== Counterinsurgency ===
Counterinsurgency operations were successful in reducing the impact of Confederate guerrilla warfare. In Arkansas, Union forces used a wide variety of strategies to defeat irregulars. They included the use of Arkansas Unionist forces as anti-guerrilla troops, the use of riverine forces such as gunboats to control the waterways, and the provost marshal's military law enforcement system to spy on suspected guerrillas and to imprison those who were captured. Against Confederate raiders, the Union army developed an effective cavalry itself and reinforced that system by numerous blockhouses and fortification to defend strategic targets.

However, Union attempts to defeat Mosby's Partisan Rangers fell short of success because of Mosby's use of very small units (10–15 men) that operated in areas that were considered to be friendly to the Confederates. Another regiment, known as Thomas' Legion, had white and anti-Union Cherokee Indians, morphed into a guerrilla force and continued fighting in the remote mountain back-country of western North Carolina for a month after Robert E. Lee's surrender at Appomattox Court House. That unit was never completely suppressed by Union forces, but it voluntarily ceased hostilities after capturing the town of Waynesville, North Carolina, on May 10, 1865.

== Aftermath ==
In the late 20th century, several historians focused on the Confederate government's decision to not use guerrilla warfare to prolong the war. Near the end of the war, some in the Confederate administration advocated continuing the fight as a guerrilla conflict. Such efforts were opposed by Confederate generals such as Lee, who ultimately believed that surrender and reconciliation were the best options for the war-ravaged South.

== Notable guerrillas ==
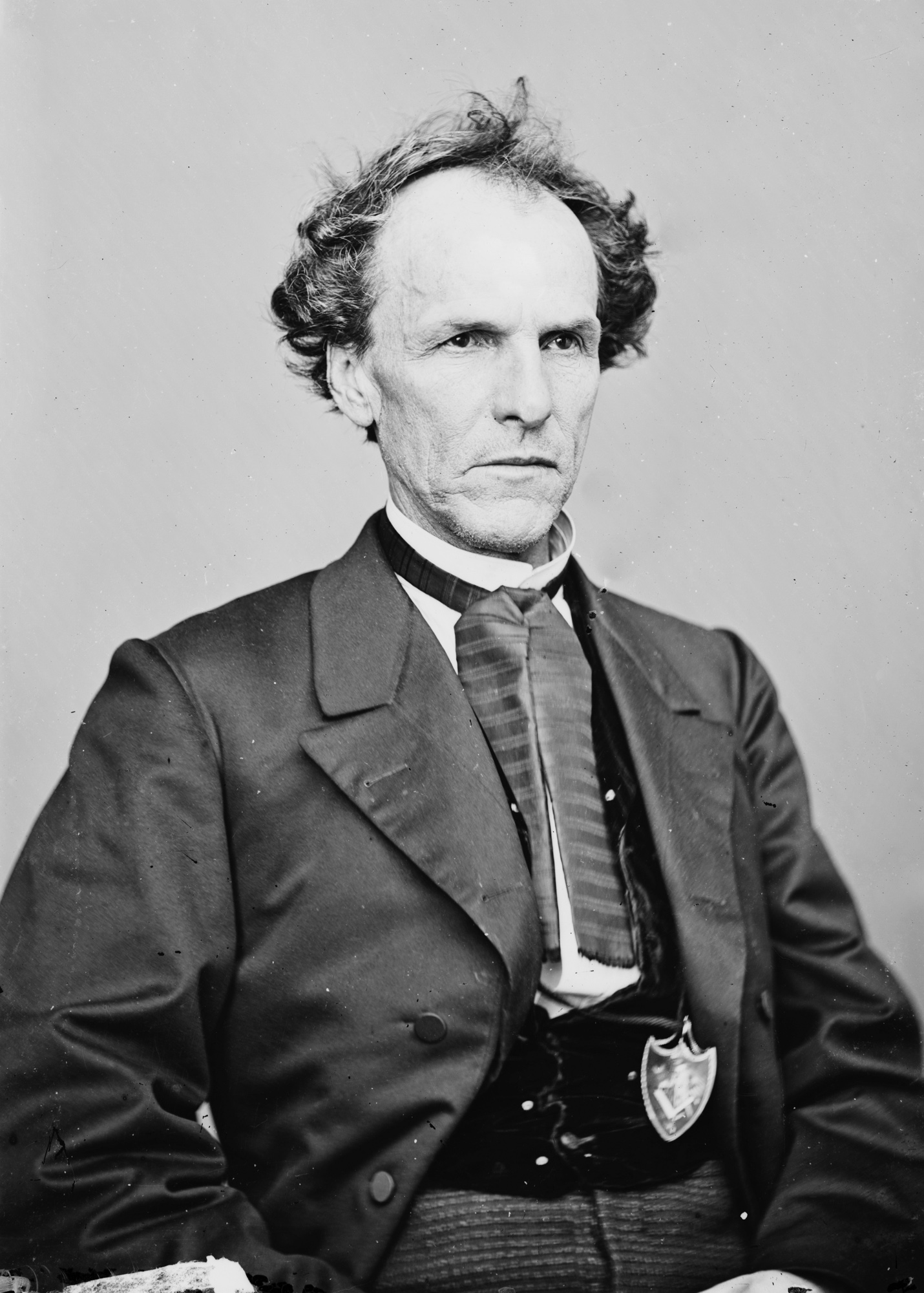
James H. Lane
USA

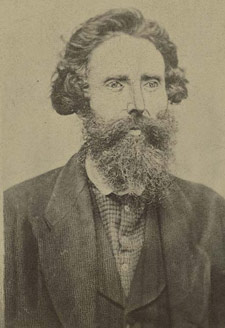
Colonel James Montgomery USA

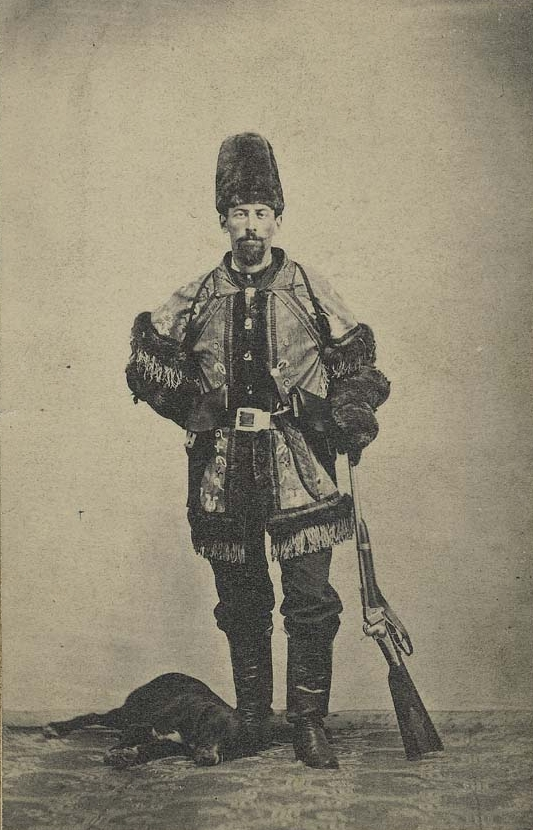
Charles R. Jennison
USA

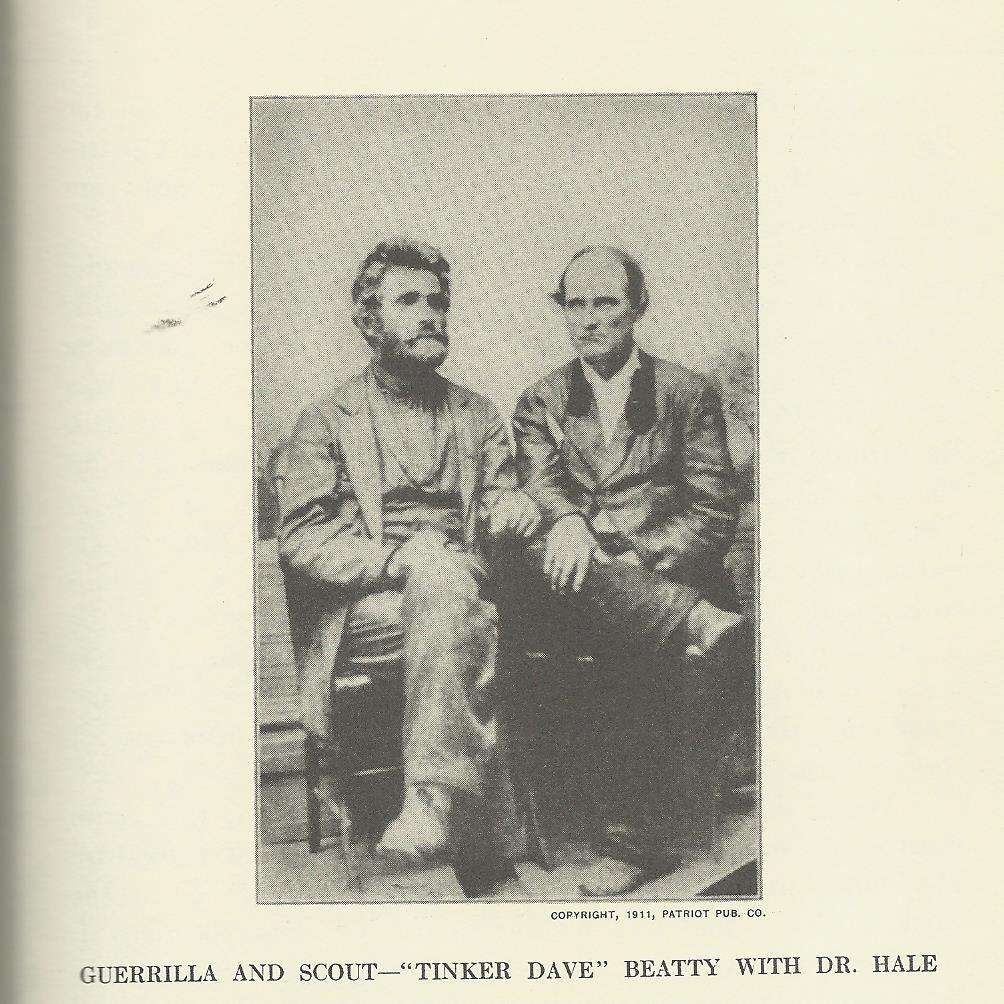
"Tinker Dave" Beatty and Dr. Hale
USA

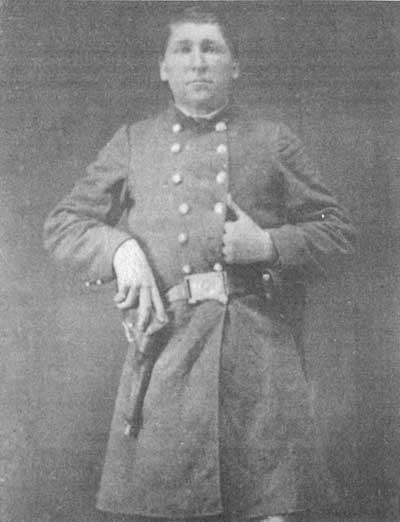
John Mobberly
CSA

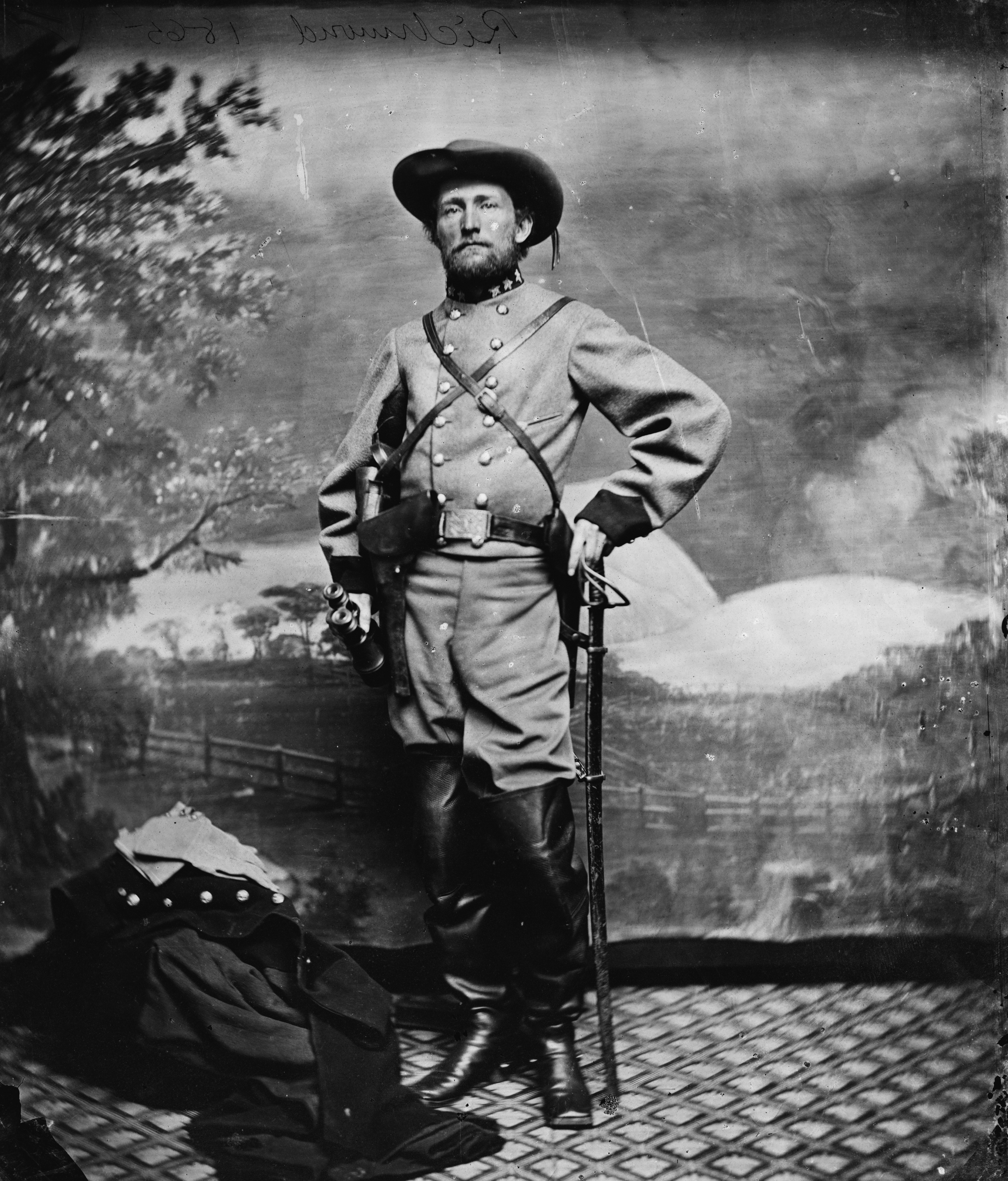
John S. Mosby
CSA

John Hunt Morgan
CSA

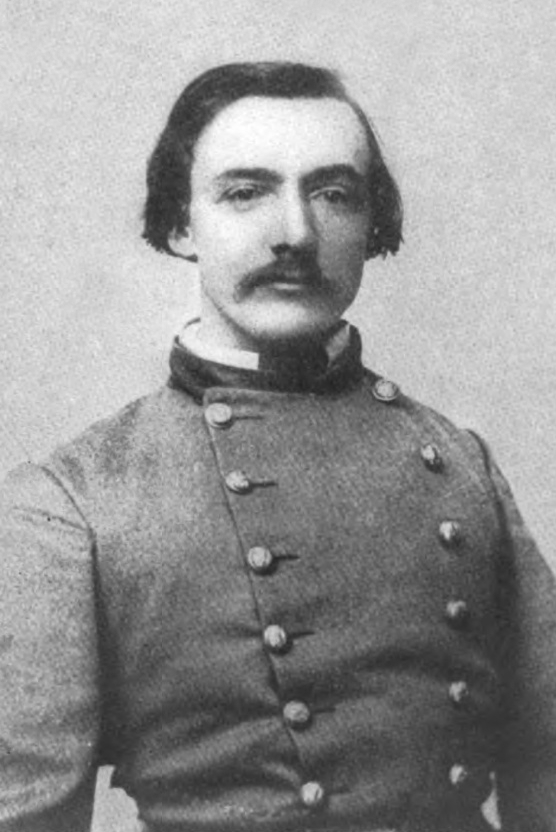
"Stovepipe" Johnson
CSA

M. Jerome Clarke, aka "Sue Mundy"
CSA

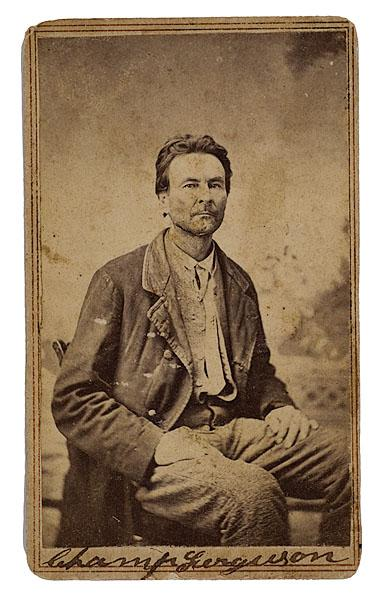
Champ Ferguson
CSA

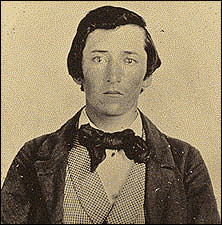
William Quantrill
CSA

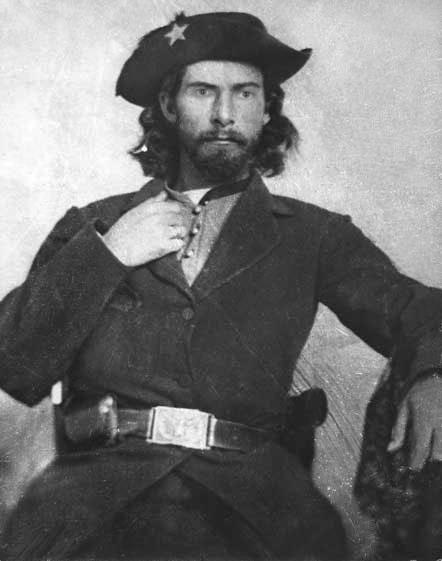
William T. Anderson
CSA

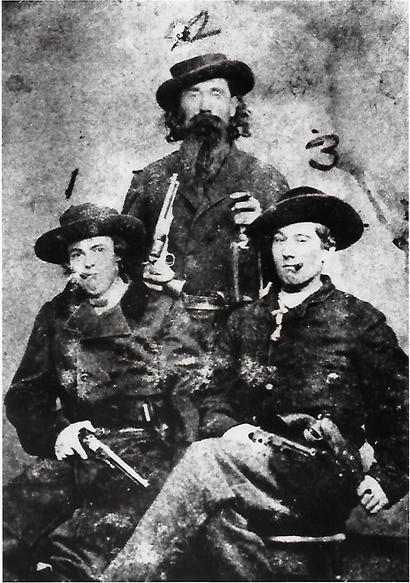
From left to right: Arch Clements, Dave Pool, and Bill Hendricks brandishing revolvers in Sherman, Texas, 1863

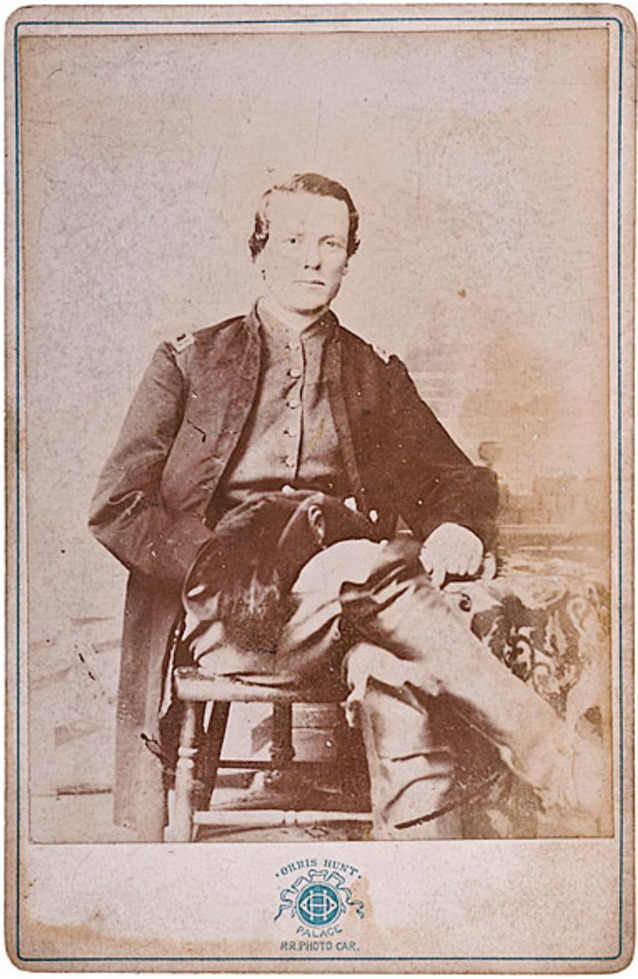
George M. Todd

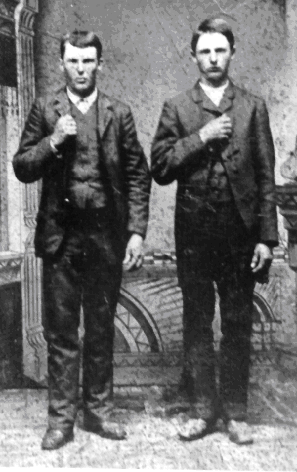
Jesse James and Frank James
CSA

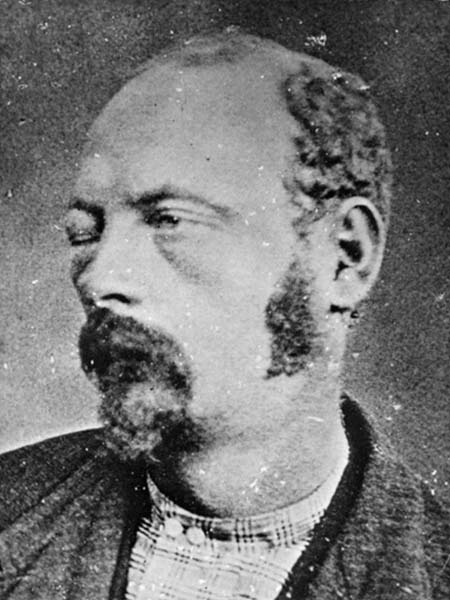
Cole Younger
CSA

Jim Younger
CSA

== See also ==
- Bushwhackers (Confederate)
- Jayhawkers (Union)
- Partisan rangers (Confederate)

== Sources ==
- U.S. War Department, The War of the Rebellion: A Compilation of the Official Records of the Union and Confederate Armies, 70 volumes in 4 series. Washington, D.C.: United States Government Printing Office, 1880–1901.
- Lowell Hayes Harrison, James c. Klotter, A New History of Kentucky, Lexington, KY: University Press of Kentucky, 1997
