= List of public art in Louisville, Kentucky =

This is a list of public art in Louisville, Kentucky, in the United States. This list applies only to works of public art on permanent display in an outdoor public space. For example, this does not include artworks in museums. Public art may include sculptures, statues, monuments, memorials, murals, and mosaics.

Image	Title / subject	Location and coordinates	Date	Artist / designer	Type	Material	Dimensions	Designation	Owner / administrator	Wikidata	Notes
	Charles R. Farnsley	West Main District, Louisville	1999	Dawn D. Yates	Statue	Bronze					The former Louisville mayor's statue "sits" on a park bench
More images	Confederate Monument in Louisville	Belknap Campus of the University of Louisville 38°13′5″N 85°45′43″W	1895	Ferdinand Freiherr von Miller	Monument	Bronze; Granite				Q5159703	Relocated to Brandenburg, Kentucky in 2016
	David (inspired by Michelangelo)	21c Museum Hotel 38°15′25.6″N 85°45′42.1″W	2011	Serkan Özkaya	Statue					Q5230431	
	Gracehoper	Louisville Waterfront Park 38°15′36.7″N 85°44′55″W	1989	Tony Smith	Sculpture	Steel				Q5591456	
More images	Jefferson Monument	Louisville Metro Hall 38°15′15″N 85°45′34″W	1901	Moses Jacob Ezekiel	Statue	Bronze; Granite				Q18739435	
More images	John B. Castleman Monument	Cherokee Triangle 38°14′7.004″N 85°42′44.888″W	1913	Roland Hinton Perry	Equestrian statue	Bronze; Granite				Q6219879	
	Kentucky Medal of Honor Memorial	Intersection of Fifth and Jefferson Streets 38°15′15.14″N 85°45′32.66″W	2001	Doyle Glass	Statue	Bronze; Granite				Q3450150	
	Lincoln Memorial at Waterfront Park	Louisville Waterfront Park	2009	Ed Hamilton	Statue					Q28007041	
	Louisville Clock	Fourth Street	1976	Barney Bright	Sculpture					Q6689463	Dismantled in 2015
	The Prodigal Son	Speed Art Museum	1939	George Grey Barnard	Statue	Carrara marble				Q85808212	Replica of the original at the Pennsylvania State Capitol
	Say Their Names		2020	Whitney Holbourn	Mural					Q108402940	
	Statue of Louis XVI			Achille Valois	Statue					Q104862873	Removed in 2020
