= Hoblitzell =

Hoblitzell is a surname that applies to the following people:

- Bruce Hoblitzell (1887–1970), mayor of Louisville, Kentucky (1957–1961)
- Fetter Schrier Hoblitzell (1838–1900), American politician from Maryland
- Frederick Hoblitzell (1890-1964), Canadian businessman and member of the House of Commons
- John D. Hoblitzell Jr. (1912–1962), American politician from West Virginia
