= Confederate Monument in Louisville =

- U.S. National Register of Historic Places
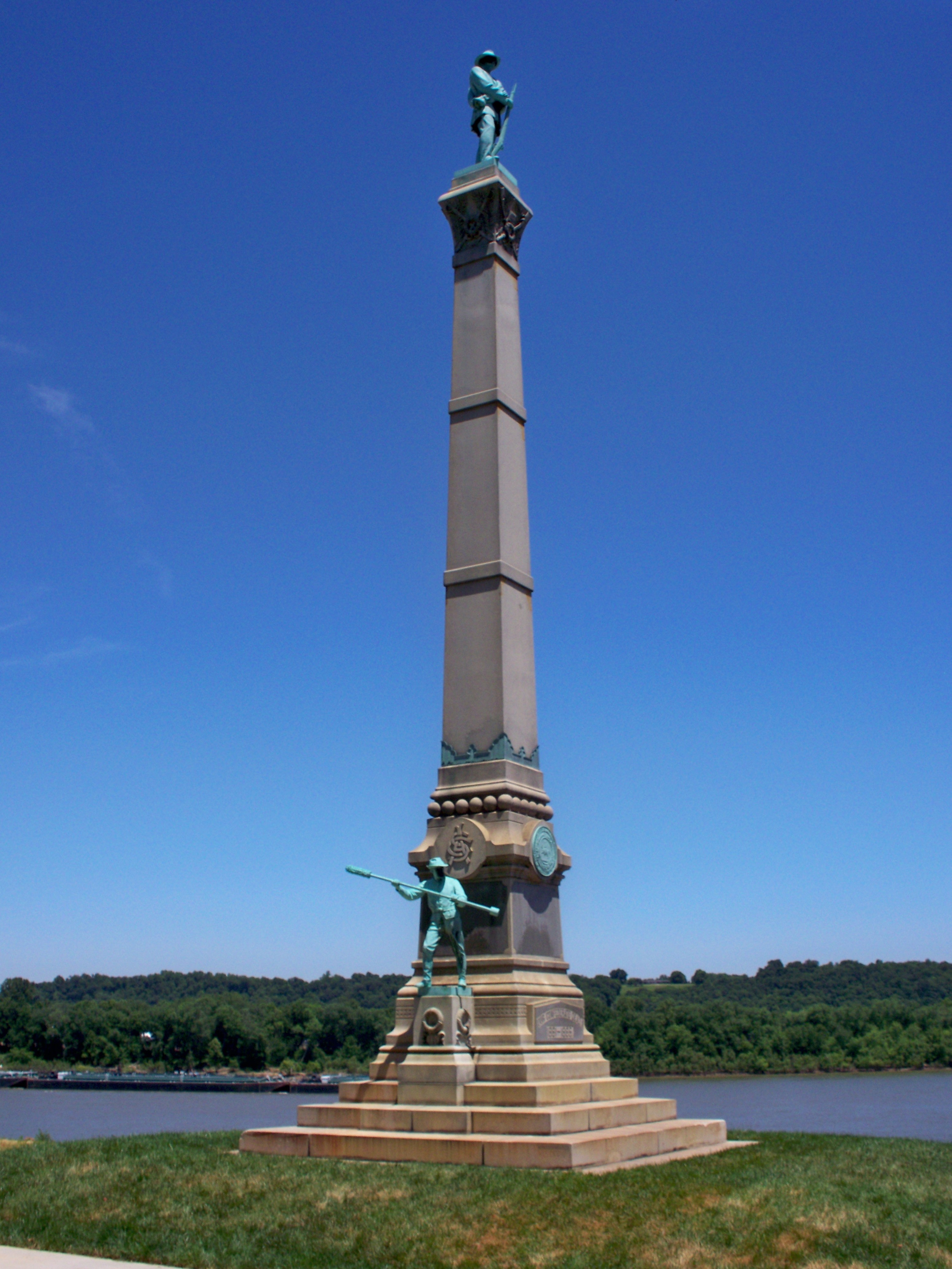
- Monument in Brandenburg, June 2017. Ohio River in background.

- Location within Kentucky Location within the United States
- Location: Riverfront Park, Brandenburg, Kentucky
- Built: 1895
- Architect: Ferdinand von Miller II
- MPS: Civil War Monuments of Kentucky MPS
- NRHP reference No.: 97000689
- Added to NRHP: July 17, 1997

The Confederate Monument in Louisville is a 70-foot-tall monument (21 m) formerly adjacent to and surrounded by the University of Louisville Belknap Campus in Louisville, Kentucky, United States. Relocation of the monument to Brandenburg, Kentucky, along the town's riverfront began in November 2016, and was completed in mid-December of that year. The granite and bronze structure was erected in 1895 by the Muldoon Monument Company with funds raised by the Kentucky Woman's Confederate Monument Association. The monument commemorates the sacrifice of Confederate veterans who died in the American Civil War.

As with many monuments to the Confederacy, some community activists, such as Louisville's late Reverend Louis Coleman, had called for the removal of the monument from such a prominent location due to an association with the history of civil rights abuses against African-Americans. In the past, both the city and university opposed such proposals. In 2002, the university announced an effort to add civil rights monuments in the vicinity of the Louisville location as part of a redevelopment called "Freedom Park". Two million dollars of funding, principally for the park, was secured in late 2008.

In late April 2016, officials in Louisville announced intention to remove the monument to another location. Subsequently, a Jefferson County Circuit Court Judge signed a temporary restraining order filed by the Kentucky Division of the Sons of Confederate Veterans but dissolved the restraining order at a later hearing in May 2016.

On November 15, 2016, the Office of the Mayor in Louisville stated the monument would be dismantled and moved to Brandenburg, Kentucky. This was following input from the Louisville Commission on Public Art which held an open meeting earlier in July and received public suggestions. The town of Brandenburg performed a dedication ceremony, following the relocation, in May 2017.

== History ==
The idea for the monument was first conceived in the basement of the Walnut Street Baptist Church in May 1887 during discussion concerning the decoration of graves at Cave Hill Cemetery. By early June 1887, the first permanent officers and representatives from the state were selected and letters of support were read. Michael Muldoon, of the Louisville monument company, enclosed a photo of a Baltimore monument and advised in his letter only granite and bronze would stand the test of time. Nelly Marshall McAfee, author, poet, and daughter of Humphrey Marshall, expressed her regret at not being able to attend:

I will hold myself in readiness to fulfill any duties allotted to me, and pledge myself to heartily cooperate with any committee to which I maybe assigned by the association. It is a movement in the right direction and has all my sympathy. I would suggest that committees be appointed to organize societies for the advancement of the noble work in every town and hamlet in Kentucky. For myself, I stand ready to do whatever may be required within the scope of my power, whether the work lies at my hand or requires me to canvass the State.

— Nelly Marshall McAfee, Letter from 1887

In an 1890 act of incorporation, the association's sole purpose was to erect a monument to the memory of soldiers of the Confederacy in or near the city of Louisville. From conception to completion, the Kentucky Woman's Confederate Monument Association grew from 17 to over 250 members led by Susan Marshall Preston Hepburn as the association president. Hepburn, sister of William Preston and sister-in-law of Albert Sidney Johnston, had previously served as President of the Ladies Aid Society of the Masonic Widows and Orphans Home. While a large share of association members were from the Louisville area, women from across the state of Kentucky participated in an organization of 11 districts. As an example, in 1889, it was reported over 40 women in Henderson, including Miss Mary Towles Sasseen, had organized in support. Sasseen, a school teacher, was an early advocate for Mother's Day.

A marble arch over 3rd Street, dedicated to the "Unknown Confederate Dead", was an early monument proposal. Later the depression of 1893 appeared to slow funding. Examples of fund raising efforts included a performance of Ben Hur with over 100 performers in 1891, performance of the Toy Symphony in 1890, and river excursions on the Columbia. After the years of picnics, auctions, canvassing, dances, and other inducements, the monument was completed in summer 1895 at a cost of $12,000. The association continued to hold fund raisers over a year after the dedication to pay off the outstanding debt to the Muldoon Monument Company. A lecture in November 1895 by Henry Watterson, editor of The Courier-Journal, netted over $700 for the purpose.

At the close of the 19th century, the surviving members of the monument association continued efforts as members of the United Daughters of the Confederacy. Hepburn requested the women not organize into a chapter until the remaining monument debt was paid off. Fifty members of the monument association organized the Albert Sydney Johnston Chapter #120 of the U.D.C. in 1897. Hepburn died shortly afterwards. By 1900, the women had raised funds for the construction of a stone fence and lamps around the monument, and in the fall of that year, the Louisville city councilmen were arguing whether the cost to light the lanterns should be paid from private or city funds. In 1901, the remaining balance was donated towards the construction of another project.

=== Yandell proposal ===
In early August 1894, the Board of Public Works gave permission to the association to erect the monument on 3rd Street and began preparations to the site. Over 20 design submissions were accepted as the result of a public notice. The monument association executive committee, in a unanimous vote, initially chose the monument and sculpture design of Enid Yandell and William J. Dodd, the architect, as the best of an ostensibly blind competition in September 1894. When informed of the selection, the larger association rejected the design. The Confederate Veteran magazine had earlier reported on Yandell's efforts in November 1893:

She has opened a studio in New York, but hopes for her greatest patronage from the South. She is at present making studies for a magnificent Confederate monument, to be erected in one of our Southern States.

— Confederate Veteran

Yandell's proposed design was a female allegorical figure described as martial 'Fame' rising 75 feet high on a base of white limestone, a pedestal of gray granite, and a column of red granite with five 15-foot high bronze candelabras surrounding the perimeter. Association member concerns included Yandell's youth, the accusation that Yandell's friends and family within the association had influenced the executive committee vote, a belief the design should have included a soldier, and skepticism of the total construction expense and monument stability. A larger vote was conducted of association members and Muldoon's design polled 2–1 over Yandell's submission. Yandell and Dodd, on the recommendation of an architecture committee, expressed willingness to replace the limestone base with granite while admitting the design adjustment would eliminate any profit.

=== Dedication ===
After a seven-month delay to fully prepare the site, the cornerstone was laid on May 25, 1895. Within the cornerstone, in a copper box, association members placed historical items including a mourning scarf, newspapers, poem and photographs, memoirs, Confederate currency, a Bible and a cigar of Jefferson Davis. Afterwards approximately 5,000 attended the decoration of graves at Cave Hill cemetery. The dedication was on July 30, 1895, in time to coincide with the 29th Grand Army of the Republic annual reunion later in September. The occasion began at 3 P.M. with a parade which started on Broadway passing down 3rd street to the monument and included 200 ex-Confederate soldiers following the band from the Industrial School of Reform. The only Confederate flag at the occasion was battle worn from the war and unfurled at the end of the event. Mayor Henry S. Tyler accepted the monument on behalf of the city. Basil W. Duke gave the oration, reportedly interrupted repeatedly by applause, in front of a large crowd gathered at the grounds of the School of Reform.

A people who can forget, or regard with indifference, its patriotic dead, is on the verge of national decadence and disgrace, from which no patriotic effort can save it, even if among a people any remnant of patriotic spirit can survive. There may come a time, but woe to the world if it shall come, when men will cease to feel this sentiment. When that time comes all that makes life worth living will have been banished from the earth.

— Basil Wilson Duke, 1895 Monument Dedication

=== Raleigh monument and Judge Thompson ===
Muldoon constructed a similar monument, using original sculptures by Ferdinand Freiherr von Miller, in 1895 at the State Capitol grounds in Raleigh, North Carolina. Constructed at a cost of $25,000, this monument was paid from a state appropriation rather than private donations. The utilization of the same statue design significantly reduced the cost of construction in Louisville.

Research published in 1956 by Justus Bier, at the time Chair of the Department of Fine Arts at the University of Louisville, suggests one or both of the two lateral figures of both monuments were modeled by von Miller from photographs of W. R. Dicks, a Raleigh, North Carolina Confederate veteran. One of the uniforms was thought modeled from another Raleigh veteran, Thomas P. Devereux. The model for the infantryman of both monuments was believed to have been a photograph of Judge Reginald H. Thompson of Louisville.

A Grand Master of Kentucky Masons, and Confederate veteran, Judge Thompson founded the Kentucky Children's Home and Newsboy's Home and Night School. He also took an active role with the Industrial School of Reform located across the street from the monument as well as the Masonic Widows and Orphans Home. During his funeral procession in 1899, those of all social classes and children from orphanages across the city of Louisville lined the streets to pay their respects. At the time of the dedication, it was reported that Judge Thompson's wife, Elizabeth, was chair of the association auxiliary committee.

The Courier-Journal, in May 1895, wistfully described the top figure:

But to see the genius of the creator one must look upon the face. The eyes, beneath a broad felt hat, seemed fixed thoughtfully upon some far distant object, while every line and lineament of the face blend into an expression of unutterable sadness. "He looks like the 'Lost Cause'", almost whispered one veteran with a tear in his eye.

— The Courier-Journal

J. M. Arnold who served with Thompson in the war for four years wrote in 1910 of his gallantry in the war and of his funeral:

It appeared all of Louisville was in the procession or on the streets. Children from the Masonic Home, bootblacks, newsboys stood in front of his home, and as his remains were brought out they sang his favorite hymn. On that grand Confederate Monument in Louisville there is a profile of Col. Reginald H. Thompson. Whether it was so designed, I don't know.

— Captain J. M. Arnold, Confederate Veteran

=== 20th century proposals ===
During the 1920s and 1940s, there were proposals to move the monument to nearby Triangle Park (Stansbury Park) as a solution for traffic congestion and accidents, until public sentiment and city officials saved it. In 1921, Mayor George Weissinger Smith and the U.D.C. opposed the removal briefly advocated by the chairman of the Board of Public Works. Later, Louisville Mayor Charles P. Farnsley, a fighter for civil rights, and camp commander of the local Sons of Confederate Veterans, stood guard in front of the monument with a musket and made a public announcement on his wishes to keep the monument where it was. At a Rotary Club meeting in 1949, Farnsley was asked of the legal impediment to moving the monument to Triangle Park. Farnsley quipped, "I'm the only hindrance, and I'm not legal."

In 1954, the monument faced a more serious effort from Mayor Andrew Broaddus, grandson of one of the women of the monument association, to relocate the structure as a part of a $19 million citywide traffic project. By 1956, the mayor and the city compromised and agreed to reduce the area around the monument from a 48-foot diameter circle to a smaller elliptic plot to ease the traffic quandary and avoid moving the monument. The work, completed in 1957 at a cost of $140,000, closed off the Shipp Street entrance and directed local traffic from 3rd and 2nd Streets across Brandeis Avenue.

=== Freedom Park ===
The area presently occupied by the nearby University of Louisville was purchased in 1850 by the city for use as an underutilized cemetery. In 1859, the city transferred the land to the House of Refuge, an orphanage and reform school, also known as the Industrial School of Reform after 1886. As the first buildings neared completion, the Civil War broke out and the Union Army commandeered the buildings as hospitals until 1865. The University of Louisville purchased the property in 1923. The chapel of the House of Refuge was converted to The Belknap Playhouse by the university by 1925. In 1980, the Playhouse was rebuilt across the street at the north end of a triangle of land which included the Confederate monument to the south.

In 2002, plans were conceived to integrate the monument and the Playhouse into the larger Freedom Park, with trees transplanted from Civil War battlefields. Meanwhile, a small street nearby then known as Confederate Place was renamed Unity Place. The street name change was requested by student leaders as early as 1989. In January 2005, before the park development was funded, community activist Rev. Louis Coleman submitted a letter to Mayor Jerry Abramson advocating removal of the monument. On November 17, 2008, funding was approved, with the Kentucky state government using $1.6 million of federal funds and the university spending $403,000. Louisville sculptor Ed Hamilton was selected to create a civil rights monument to balance the Confederate Monument; Hamilton had already created an Abraham Lincoln memorial statue in Louisville. In 2002, the late J. Blaine Hudson, at the time Chair of the Pan-African Studies Department at the University of Louisville, explained:

What we hope to do with Freedom Park is to put all the historical information on the table and develop an interpretation that reflects as accurately as possible the totality of the Civil War and the late Antebellum experience of this area.

— J. Blaine Hudson, 2002 Press Statement

In September 2015, the park's name was changed to Charles H. Parrish Jr. Freedom Park. The name reflects the contributions of Dr. Parrish (1899–1989) as the University of Louisville's first African-American educator and Chair of the Sociology Department. The park contains a series of black granite obelisks detailing the history of Louisville as well as panels to commemorate the lives of community civil rights leaders.

=== 2016 relocation proposal ===
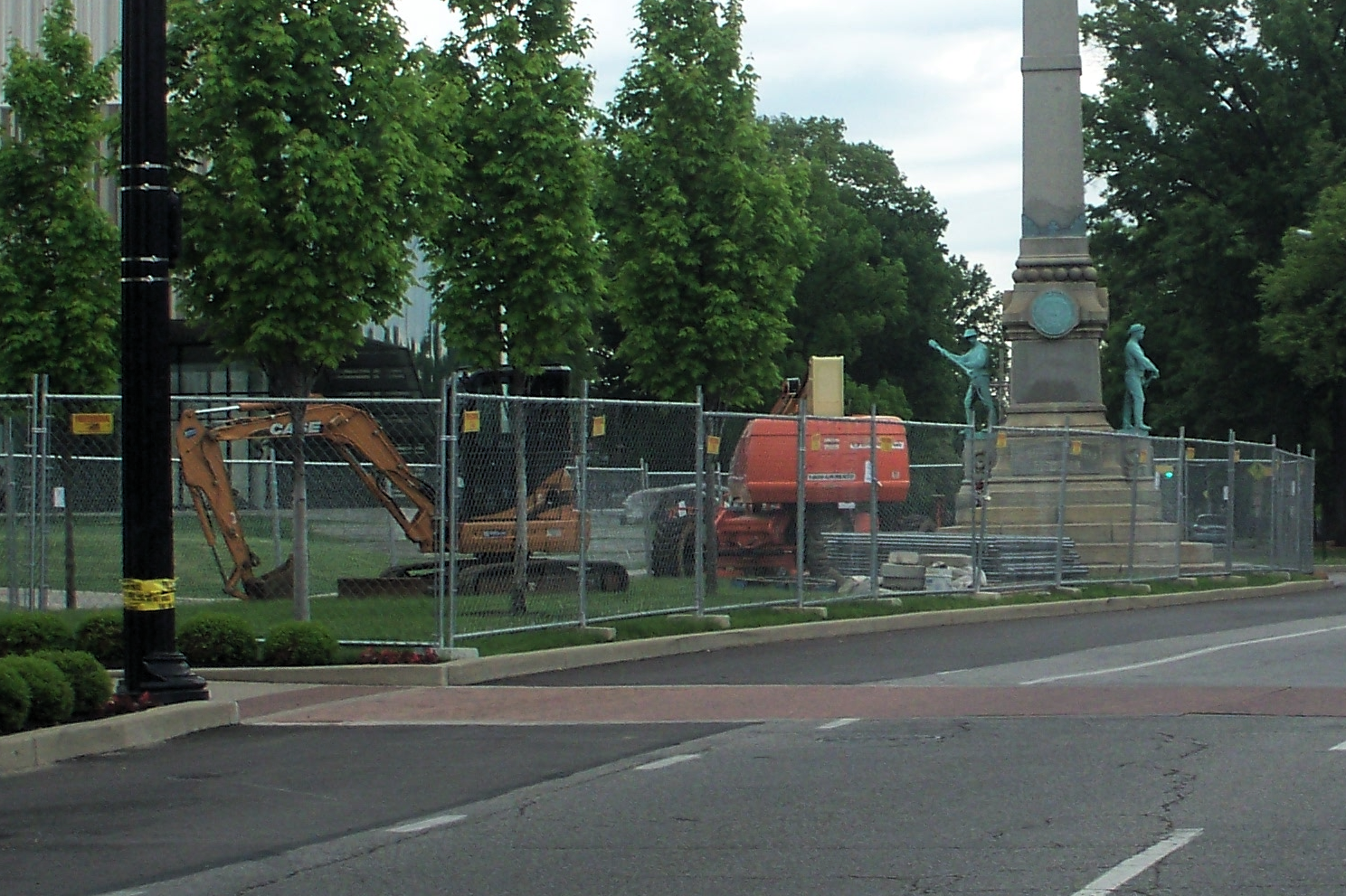
Base of Confederate Monument with fence and construction equipment, May 2016.

At a press conference, on April 29, 2016, the Mayor of Louisville Greg Fischer and University President James R. Ramsey explained their intention to immediately remove the monument and place it into storage where it would receive cleaning. They stated the monument would be reconstructed at a new location but the location had not yet been determined.

On May 2, 2016, a Jefferson County Circuit Court Judge signed a temporary restraining order filed by the Kentucky Division of the Sons of Confederate Veterans along with several private individuals. The next day, the Jefferson County Attorney, representing the Mayor, asked for more time to prepare a defense for the intended monument removal. The court granted an extension to May 25, 2016.

The plaintiffs contended that Mayor Fischer, by attempting removal of the monument, was violating state and federal preservation law. On May 5, 2016, the attorney for the plaintiffs amended the complaint arguing the monument does not belong to the City of Louisville nor the university. The revised complaint contended the monument belongs to the State of Kentucky as it is a part of the transportation right of way.

At a hearing on May 25, 2016, citing lack of evidence to issue an injunction, the Circuit Court Judge dissolved the temporary restraining order. The City of Louisville agreed to hold the removal until the Judge completed her written ruling. Judge Judith McDonald-Burkman dismissed the lawsuit on June 20, 2016, allowing the city to remove the monument. In her ruling, the judge agreed there was no title or other document establishing legal ownership of the monument, but that the plaintiff's arguments were not sufficient.

These monuments, as well as other symbols of the Confederacy, are now viewed as a romanticism of the past, pride in 'Southern Heritage,' history to be acknowledged and lessons learned, reminders of slavery or indicative of present racist sentiment. The court recognizes, even if it does not agree with, these often-times competing emotional elements. However the court must remain objectively focused on the legal aspects...emotional and political aspects will be left for others to debate.

— Judge Judith McDonald-Burkman, 2016 Ruling

Subsequently, Mayor Fischer stated no work would proceed until the city art commission had met and chosen a new site. In July 2016, the Louisville Commission on Public Art met with the public to discuss options of where to move the monument. Suggestions to the commission included a river front park in Brandenburg, Perryville Battlefield State Historic Site, and a site in Paducah owned by the Sons of Confederate Veterans.

=== Brandenburg, Kentucky ===
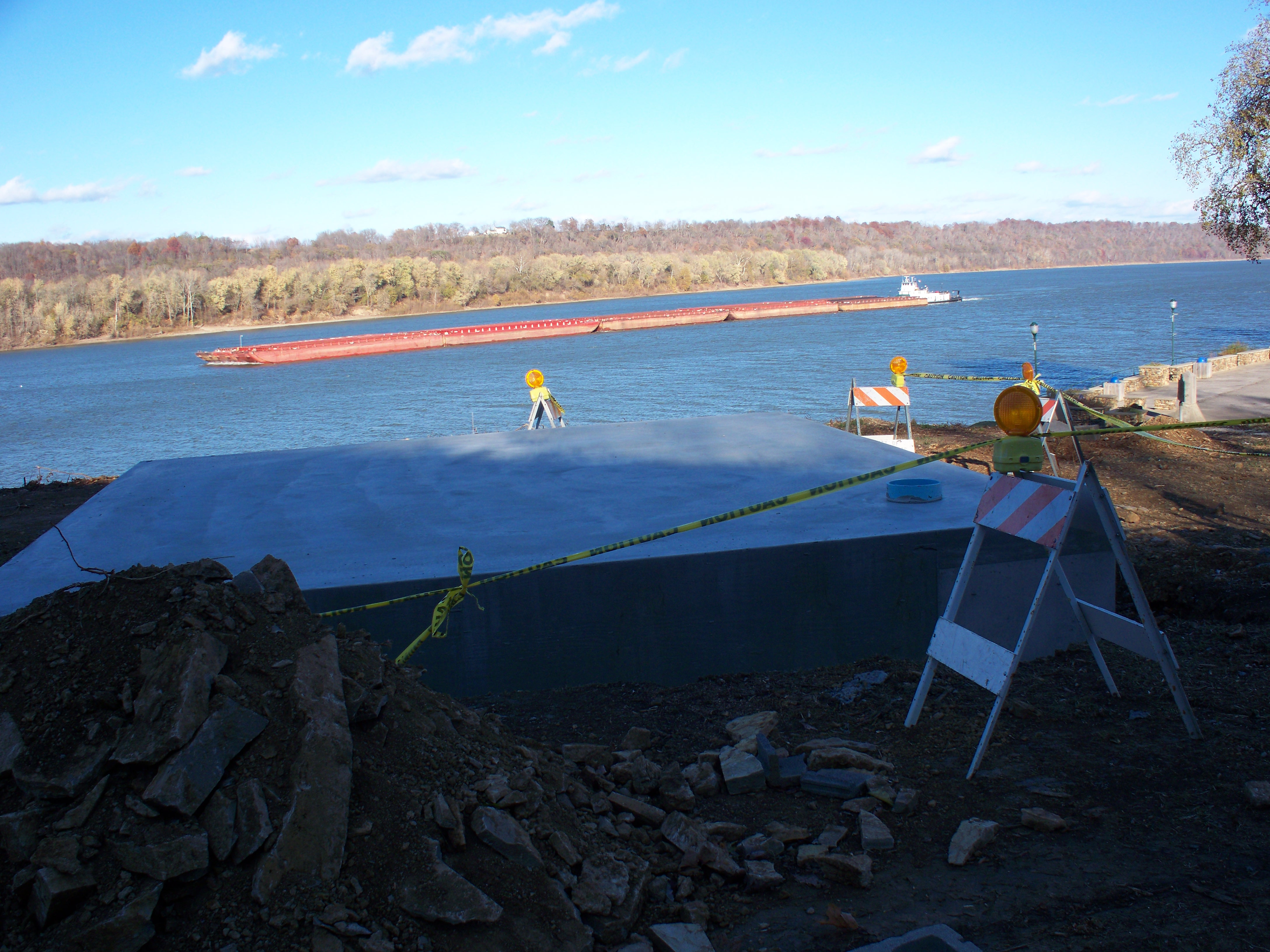
Foundation for Confederate Monument, Riverfront Park, Brandenburg on November 19, 2016. Before installation of Louisville monument. Ohio River in background.

On November 15, 2016, Mayor Fischer announced the monument would be moved to Brandenburg, located 44 miles west of Louisville along the Ohio River in Meade County, Kentucky. Sarah Lindgren, the public art administrator for Louisville, said the time capsule, thought located within the monument, would be loaned to the Filson Historical Society for an exhibit if it was found. Dismantlement of the monument began November 19, 2016, and the time capsule was located two days later, and found to be in a poor state of preservation. The monument was scheduled to be moved to Brandenburg the week of November 28, 2016.

The University of Louisville Foundation estimated the cost of moving the monument at roughly $400,000. $350,000 was estimated as contributed by the Foundation, with $50,000 from the City of Louisville, and with the town of Brandenburg contributing an initial $10,000 for the new foundation. Messer Construction was tasked with the construction effort. The Mayor of Brandenburg, Ronnie Joyner, said the patina on the statues would not be removed. This decision was estimated to save about $7,400 in cost to the Foundation.

The work to relocate the monument to Brandenburg was completed on December 12, 2016. A monument rededication ceremony was performed on May 29, 2017, with approximately 400 in attendance.

The new location for the Confederate Monument is immediately west of the Riverfront Park at the terminus of Main Street in Brandenburg. The foundation is resting on St. Louis Limestone. East of the monument is a state historical marker where Gen. John Hunt Morgan and his men crossed into Indiana in July 1863. The state marker is an entry for a historical walking trail along the Ohio River. Figures commemorating Native American settlement of the region, the Underground Railroad and additional information panels regarding Morgan's crossing are located along the trail. The park is the site for a biennial Civil War reenactment of the Great Raid of 1863.

In June 2020 there were protests of the monument around the time of the George Floyd protests. People came to defend the monument after there was a rumor of a protest. Although protestors did show up, there was no formal application for a protest, or support from the Black Lives Matter organization. The attendees there to defend the monument were largely armed with rifles. Some attendees wore confederate regalia or flew Confederate battle flags.

=== Historic status ===
A 2002 act of the General Assembly created the Kentucky Military Heritage Commission. The Commission oversees the protection of monuments and memorials in their registry. The Confederate monument is currently listed as a potential site.

The monument was placed on the National Register of Historic Places on July 17, 1997, one of sixty-one different Civil War-related sites in Kentucky so honored on the same day. Three other monuments are in Louisville/Jefferson County. The 32nd Indiana Monument and the Union Monument in Louisville were both in Cave Hill Cemetery, although the first is now at Louisville's Frazier History Museum to preserve it. The Confederate Martyrs Monument in Jeffersontown is in Jeffersontown City Cemetery in Jeffersontown, Kentucky. The John B. Castleman Monument was formerly on Cherokee Circle in the Highlands, a block from Bardstown Road, but was removed on June 8, 2020. It is pending cleaning and relocation to Castleman's burial site in Cave Hill Cemetery, which has not been done as of May 2025.

In supplemental material collected for the 1997 nomination, Joseph E. Brent of the Kentucky Heritage Council argued Gaines Foster's three phases of the Lost Cause does not fit well with the Kentucky experience. Brent suggests two periods divided by the 19th and 20th centuries. Brent paraphrases the NRHP guidelines for eligibility to say that monuments moved out of their integrity of location, e.g. a monument moved from a cemetery to a public space, are not eligible for inclusion in the registry.

== Description ==
At 70 feet tall, the Louisville Confederate Monument is the second largest in the state of Kentucky and one of the most ornate. The monument was previously located at the intersection of 2nd and 3rd Streets, immediately south of West Brandeis Avenue in Louisville. It is built of granite, constructed by the Muldoon Monument Company, and includes three bronze Confederate soldiers designed by the sculptor Ferdinand von Miller II of Munich, Germany.

The infantryman located at the top of the column is 95 inches tall and in a relaxed position with his rifle. The figure was facing north in the Louisville location. The two side figures near the base of the monument are 70 inches tall. The east side artillerist is holding a ramrod with swab, and the west side cavalryman holds a partially unsheathed sword. "Our Confederate Dead. / 1861–1865." and "Tribute / to the Rank and File of the / Armies of the South / by the Kentucky Womans Confederate / Monument Association. / 1895." are inscribed on the north and south face respectively. On the north face is a bronze medallion of the Seal of the Confederate States. At the top of the column are raised relief crossed rifles on the north and south sides and raised relief crossed swords on the west and east sides. Above the side figures on the east and west and on the south side are stylized raised relief lettering "CSA". The structure weighs about 140,000 pounds.

The monument base had a diameter of 48 feet in the early 20th century. A National Register of Historic Places nomination from 1990 describes four elaborate lamp standards that were placed at compass points as a part of a stone fence that once encircled the monument. In an early mention, the monument committee in 1897 proposed to write Frederick Law Olmsted, the park architect, to draw up plans for the structure. Early 20th century reports claim the perimeter lamps were designed by Louisville sculptor Enid Yandell. By 1921, the perimeter of the monument had suffered considerable damage from automobile accidents and the original lamps were changed out after two were knocked down. Both the fence and lamps were removed for traffic considerations in 1957.

A 1991 Louisville public art survey estimated cost of repairs to the monument between $20,000 and $50,000, including repair of the deteriorating bronze portions. The length of the sheath belonging to the cavalryman at the Raleigh site indicates contemporary damage to the Louisville cast.

Bessie Laub, art critic for The Courier-Journal in 1917, summarized the Confederate Monument in Louisville at the time:

Many monuments far more handsome, of more technical value, have been erected to the soldiers of the South, but none expresses better esteem, sympathy and feeling than the Confederate monument of Louisville.

— Bessie Laub, The Courier-Journal

The monument was used widely in advertisements for the Muldoon Monument Company. The company is still operating today as Muldoon Memorials.

== Monument images ==
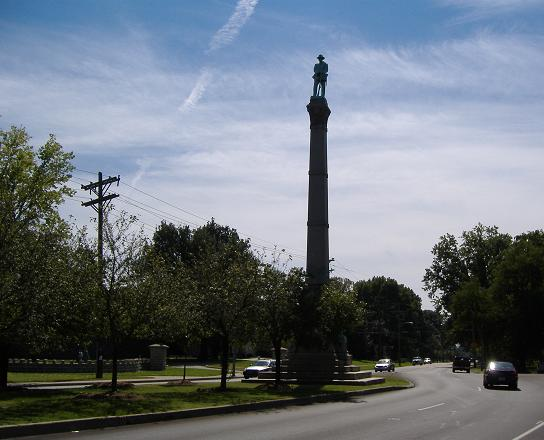
View of the monument from the north (Louisville)

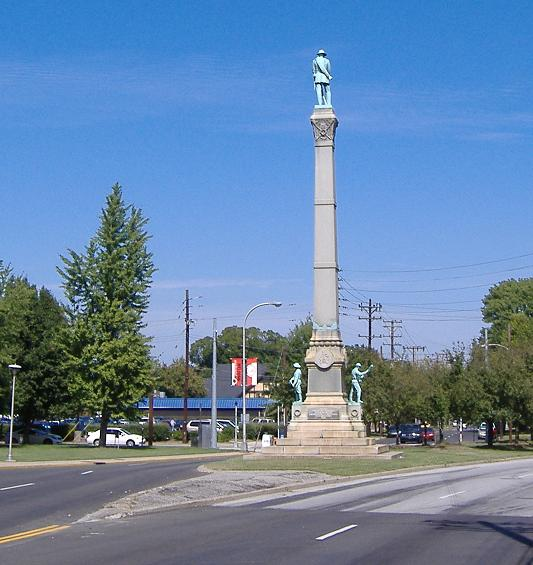
View of the monument from the south (Louisville)

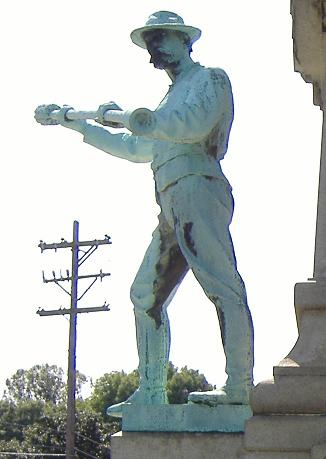
Front view of Confederate artillerist.

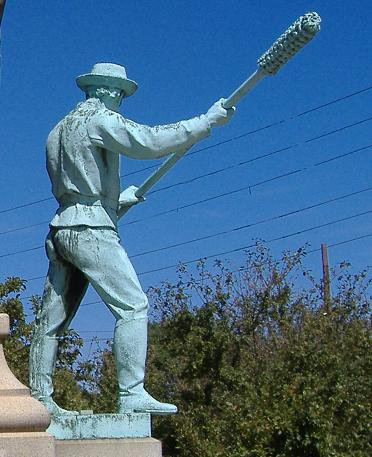
Back view of Confederate artillerist.

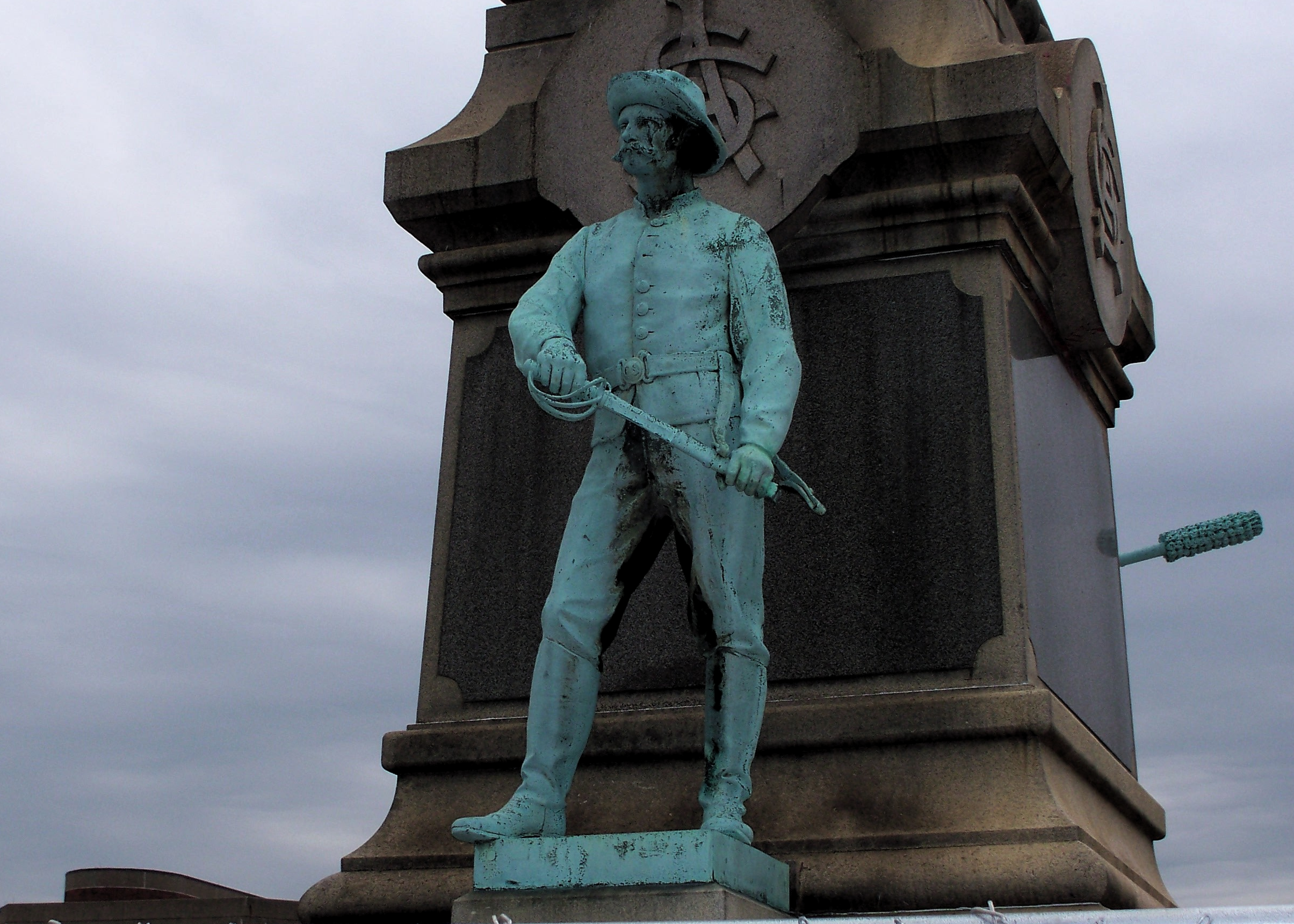
Closer view of cavalryman on west side of Confederate Monument.

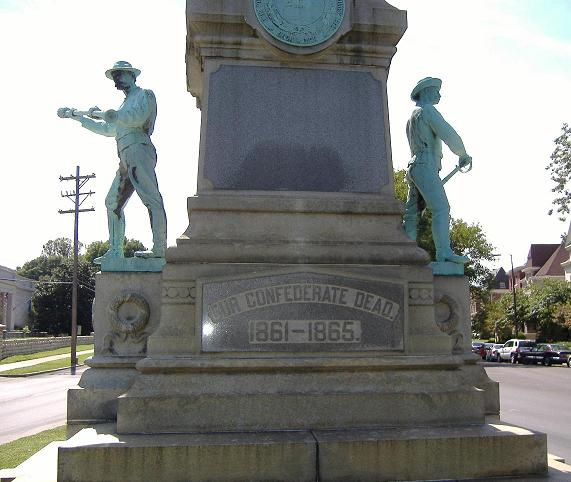
Closeup from the front/North

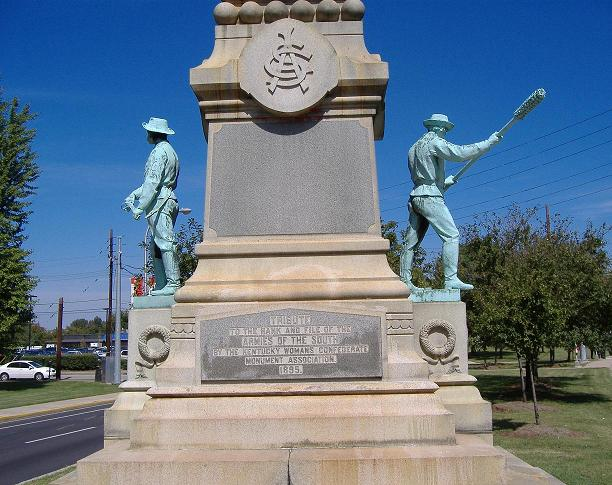
Closeup from the back/South

== See also ==
- John B. Castleman Monument
- Union Monument in Louisville
- 32nd Indiana Monument
- List of American Civil War monuments in Kentucky
- Louisville, Kentucky, in the American Civil War
- History of Louisville, Kentucky
- List of Confederate monuments and memorials
- Removal of Confederate monuments and memorials
