= Romano Mazzoli =

American politician and lawyer (1932–2022)

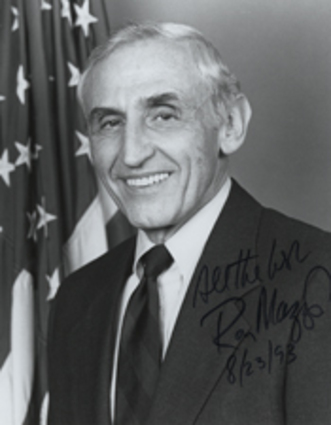

Member of the U.S. House of Representatives from Kentucky's 3rd district
- In office January 3, 1971 – January 3, 1995
- Preceded by: William Cowger
- Succeeded by: Mike Ward

Member of the Kentucky Senate from the 35th district
- In office January 1, 1968 – December 16, 1970
- Preceded by: Martin J. Duffy
- Succeeded by: Lacey Smith

Personal details
- Born: Romano Louis Mazzoli; November 2, 1932 Louisville, Kentucky, U.S.
- Died: November 1, 2022 (aged 89) Louisville, Kentucky, U.S.
- Party: Democratic
- Spouse: Helen Dillon (m. 1959; died 2012)
- Children: 2
- Education: University of Notre Dame (BS); University of Louisville (JD); Harvard University (MPA)

Military service
- Branch/service: United States Army
- Years of service: 1954-1956
- Rank: Specialist Third Class
- Romano Mazzoli's voice Mazzoli speaks in support of the National Voter Registration Act of 1993; Recorded June 16, 1992

Romano Louis "Ron" Mazzoli (November 2, 1932 – November 1, 2022) was an American politician and lawyer from Kentucky.

He represented Louisville, Kentucky, and its suburbs in the United States House of Representatives from 1971 through 1995 as a Democrat. He was the primary architect, with Senator Alan Simpson, of major immigration reform legislation.

== Early life and career ==
Mazzoli, whose father immigrated to the United States from northern Italy, was born in Louisville and was a 1950 graduate of St. Xavier High School, a Xaverian Brothers boys preparatory school. He won the 1950 Kentucky boys high school doubles tennis championship with fellow St. Xavier 1951 alumni George D. Koper. He graduated magna cum laude from the University of Notre Dame in Notre Dame, Indiana, in 1954 and from the University of Louisville School of Law, first in his class, in 1960. Mazzoli served in the Kentucky Senate from 1968 through 1970. In 1969, he ran for mayor of Louisville, and came third in the Democratic primary.

== U.S. House of Representatives ==
Mazzoli was elected to the U.S. House of Representatives in 1970, defeating Republican incumbent William Cowger by 211 votes, the closest House election of that year. Serving for the next 24 years, he was Chairman of the House of Representatives' Immigration, International Law and Refugees Subcommittee for twelve years. He also served on the Small Business, Intelligence and District of Columbia Committees.

In 1981, Mazzoli, an anti-abortion Democrat, introduced, along with Republican Henry Hyde, the Human Life Amendment, a proposed constitutional amendment which would ban all abortions by granting legal protection to all unborn children in the United States. Ultimately, the amendment failed to amass the two-thirds majority necessary to pass.

Mazzoli authored the Simpson-Mazzoli Immigration Reform and Control Act, later known as the Immigration Reform and Control Act of 1986, and cosponsored it with Republican Senator Alan K. Simpson. The bill enacted the first U.S. laws to sanction employers who hired undocumented aliens; it also granted an amnesty for aliens already living and working in the United States. After five years of debate and compromise, the Simpson-Mazzoli Bill was ultimately signed into law in November 1986. Also in 1986, Mazzoli was one of the House impeachment managers who prosecuted the case in the impeachment trial of Judge Harry E. Claiborne. Claiborne was found guilty by the United States Senate and removed from his federal judgeship.

Mazzoli did not run for reelection in 1994, leaving office in January 1995. The 104th United States Congress, the first in nearly a quarter century without Mazzoli, passed legislation (P.L 104–77), signed by President Bill Clinton on December 28, 1995, renaming the Federal Building in his hometown of Louisville, the Romano L. Mazzoli Federal Building.

== Later life ==
After leaving Congress, he taught at Bellarmine University and was the Ralph S. Petrilli Distinguished Visiting Professor of Law at the University of Louisville Law School for the Fall 1995 semester, returning later to the law school as faculty.

In 2002, Mazzoli was a Fellow at the Institute of Politics at Harvard University's John F. Kennedy School of Government. He graduated with a Masters in Public Administration from Harvard's Kennedy School of Government in June 2004. While studying for his degree, he lived on campus, where he met Pete Buttigieg, then an undergraduate student. In 2012, Mazzoli officiated Buttigieg's inauguration as mayor of South Bend, Indiana.

In September 2006, Simpson and Mazzoli co-authored an article that appeared in The Washington Post revisiting their 1986 immigration legislation.

== Personal life and death ==
Mazzoli married Helen Dillon in 1959. They had two children and remained together until her death in 2012.

Mazzoli died at his home in Louisville on November 1, 2022, one day before his 90th birthday.

== Election results ==
Kentucky's 3rd Congressional District Election (1974)
Party	Candidate	Votes	%	±%
Republican	Vincent N. Barclay	28,813	26.56	
Democratic	Romano L. Mazzoli (incumbent)	37,346	69.67	
American	William P. Chambers	3,383	3.12	
Independent	Luther J. Wilson	708	0.65	
Total votes		108,475	100.00	
Turnout				
Democratic hold				

Kentucky's 3rd Congressional District Election (1976)
Party	Candidate	Votes	%
Republican	Denzil J. Ramsey	58,019	41.22
Democratic	Romano L. Mazzoli (incumbent)	80,496	57.19
American	William P. Chambers	2,229	1.58
Total votes		140,744	100.00
Turnout			
Democratic hold			

Kentucky's 3rd Congressional District Election (1978)
Party	Candidate	Votes	%
Democratic	Romano L. Mazzoli (incumbent)	37,346	65.67
Republican	Norbert D. Leveronne	17,785	31.27
Independent	Tom Beckham	1,312	2.31
Socialist Workers	John Cumbler	428	0.75
Total votes		56,871	100.00
Turnout			
Democratic hold			

Kentucky's 3rd Congressional District Election (1980)
Party	Candidate	Votes	%
Democratic	Romano L. Mazzoli (incumbent)	85,873	63.74
Republican	Richard Cesler	46,681	34.65
American	Robert D. Vessels	468	0.35
Citizens	John Cumbler	1,272	0.94
Libertarian	Henry G. Logsdon	430	0.32
Total votes		134,724	100.00
Turnout			
Democratic hold			

Kentucky's 3rd Congressional District Election (1982)
Party	Candidate	Votes	%
Republican	Carl Brown	45,900	32.19
Democratic	Romano L. Mazzoli (incumbent)	92,849	65.11
Independent	Norbert D. Leveronne	2,840	1.99
Libertarian	Dan Murray	608	0.43
Socialist Workers	Craig Honts	400	0.28
Total votes		142,597	100.00
Turnout			
Democratic hold			

Kentucky's 3rd Congressional District Election (1984)
Party	Candidate	Votes	%
Republican	Suzanne M. Warner	68,185	31.67
Democratic	Romano L. Mazzoli (incumbent)	145,680	67.67
Independent	Peggy Kreiner	1,273	0.59
Write-In		139	0.06
Total votes		215,277	100.00
Turnout			
Democratic hold			

Kentucky's 3rd Congressional District Election (1986)
Party	Candidate	Votes	%
Republican	Lee Holmes	29,348	26.15
Democratic	Romano L. Mazzoli (incumbent)	81,943	73.01
Socialist Workers	Estelle Debates	899	0.80
Write-In		43	0.04
Total votes		112,233	100.00
Turnout			
Democratic hold			

Kentucky's 3rd Congressional District Election (1988)
Party	Candidate	Votes	%
Republican	Philip Dunnagan	57,387	30.30
Democratic	Romano L. Mazzoli (incumbent)	131,981	69.70
Total votes		189,368	100.00
Turnout			
Democratic hold			

Kentucky's 3rd Congressional District Election (1990)
Party	Candidate	Votes	%
Republican	Al Brown	55,188	39.44
Democratic	Romano L. Mazzoli	84,750	60.56
Total votes		139,938	100.00
Turnout			
Democratic hold			

Kentucky's 3rd Congressional District Election (1992)
Party	Candidate	Votes	%
Democratic	Romano L. Mazzoli (incumbent)	148,066	52.74
Republican	Susan B. Stokes	132,689	47.26
Write-In	Patricia Metten	15	0.005
Total votes		280,770	100.00
Turnout			
Democratic hold			

U.S. House of Representatives
Preceded by William O. Cowger	Member of the U.S. House of Representatives from Kentucky's 3rd congressional district 1971–1995	Succeeded by Mike Ward
