= Mayor Andrew Broaddus =

Lifesaving station in Louisville, Kentucky

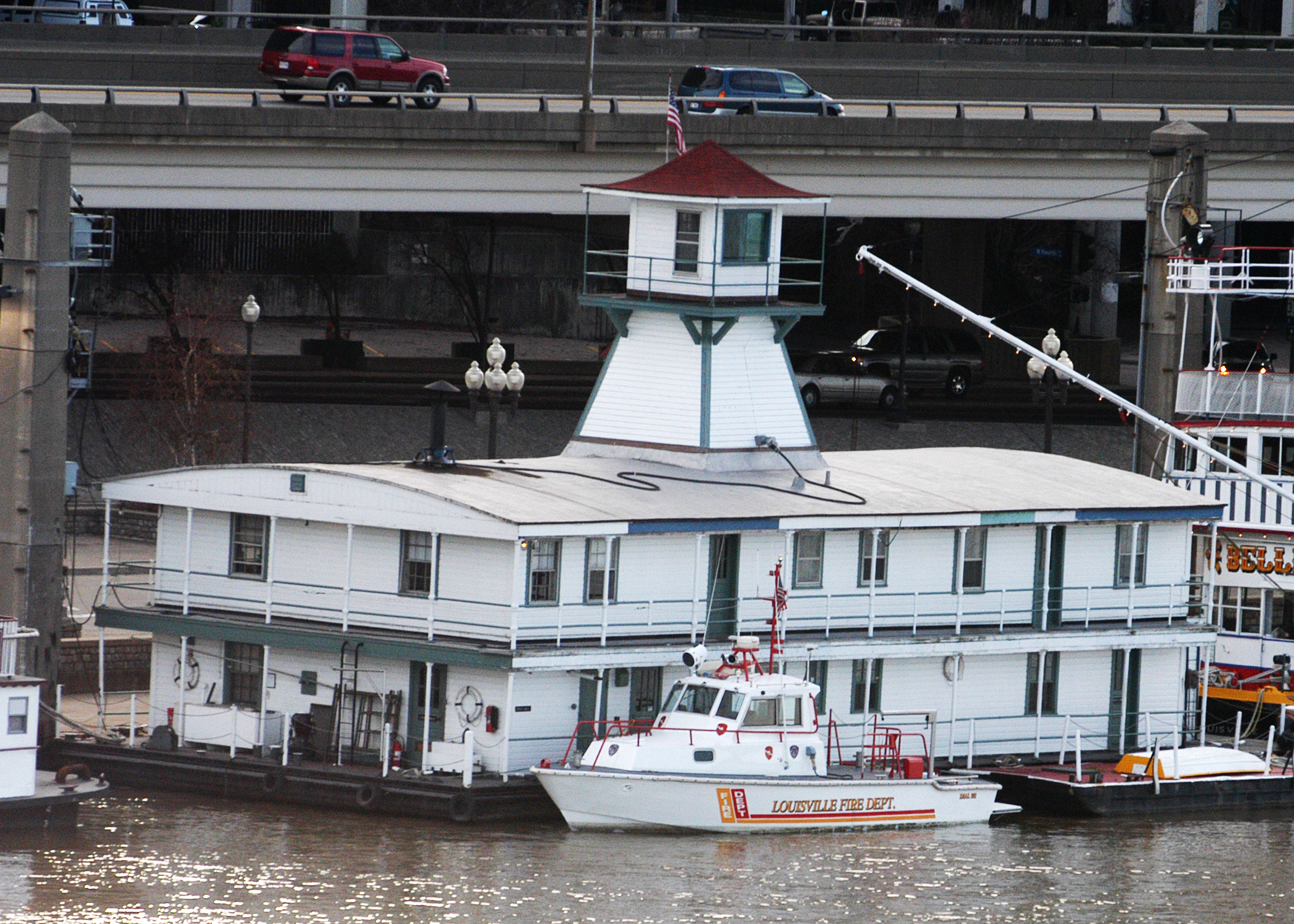
- Mayor Andrew Broaddus, a two-story structure with elevated lookout tower

History
- Name: Mayor Andrew Broaddus
- Launched: 1929

General characteristics
- Length: 98 ft (30 m)
- Beam: 38 ft (12 m)
- Depth: 5 ft (1.5 m)
- Mayor Andrew Broaddus
- U.S. National Register of Historic Places
- U.S. National Historic Landmark
- Location within Kentucky
- Location: Louisville, Kentucky
- Coordinates: 38°15′33″N 85°45′18″W
- Built: 1928
- NRHP reference No.: 89001446

Significant dates
- Added to NRHP: 30 June 1989
- Designated NHL: 30 June 1989

Mayor Andrew Broaddus is a lifesaving station built by the United States Life-Saving Service located in Louisville, Kentucky, off the corner of River Road and Fourth Street. She is named in honor of Andrew Broaddus (1900–1972), a former mayor of Louisville (1953–1957). Her historic purpose was to protect travelers on the Ohio River from the Falls of the Ohio, with rescue crews for those who fell victim to the rapids. Louisville was the first place where a lifesaving station was placed in western waters. The first lifestation in Louisville was in 1881, with Mayor Andrew Broaddus as the third. A National Historic Landmark, she is the only surviving floating lifesaving station of the United States Life-Saving Service, a predecessor of the United States Coast Guard.

== Predecessor ==
On 22 October 1881, Life Saving Station#10 was placed in service at the Falls of the Ohio at Louisville, Kentucky, the most dangerous place on the entire Ohio River. Skilled rivermen, who had served here as volunteers, became personnel of the Service. Built at the Howard Shipyards (later part of Jeffboat, closed in 2018) at Jeffersonville, Indiana, the station boat was the first on America's Western Rivers system. It served until being replaced in 1902 by another wooden hull boat. The second vessel was replaced in 1929 with the present steel-hulled boat with its distinctive watchtower. In addition to her primary role in providing aid and rescue to river travelers, LSS#10 also served notably during World War II, when Coast Guard Reservists ran patrols from the station to guard against possible acts of German sabotage.

Earlier, Station personnel also assisted in the enforcement of Prohibition by transporting Federal agents to remote islands in the Ohio River to search for illicit alcohol operations.

From 1881 to 1972, the Life Saving Service, and later the Coast Guard, patrolled the Falls area, rescuing rivermen and passengers, saving stranded boast and cargoes, recovering victims of drowning, and performing heroic action during Ohio River floods. Station records reveal that between 1881 and 1915, 7000 lives and property worth $6 million were saved by the crews of LSS#10.

== History ==
Mayor Andrew Broaddus was built in 1929 in Dubuque, Iowa. She has a steel hull, and is 98 feet (30 m) long, a beam of 38 feet (12 m), a Hold Depth of 5 feet (1.5 m), at 623 Net Tons. She has two decks, and a 15-foot-tall (4.6 m) lookout tower. She is considered in good condition.

Mayor Andrew Broaddus is the only floating lifestation and the last inland waterway lifestation for the United States Coast Guard still in existence, and one of the few reminders that the U.S. Life-Saving Service ever existed.

Mayor Andrew Broaddus currently serves as an adjunct to Belle of Louisville, also a National Historic Landmark. Mayor Andrew Broaddus provides office space for Belle of Louisville.

In the Spring of 2007, Mayor Andrew Broaddus's hull was damaged by a commercial ship. In November, she was towed to Jeffboat for repairs.

A museum within the boat was planned for the future in 2007.
