= William Cowger =

American politician (1922–1971)

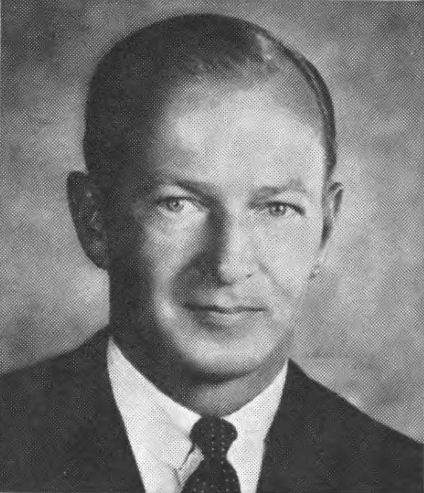

Member of the U.S. House of Representatives from Kentucky's 3rd district
- In office January 3, 1967 – January 3, 1971
- Preceded by: Charles R. Farnsley
- Succeeded by: Romano Mazzoli

49th Mayor of Louisville
- In office December 1961 – December 1965
- Preceded by: Bruce Hoblitzell
- Succeeded by: Kenneth A. Schmied

Personal details
- Born: William Owen Cowger; January 1, 1922 Hastings, Nebraska, U.S.
- Died: October 2, 1971 (aged 49) Louisville, Kentucky, U.S.
- Resting place: Cave Hill Cemetery; Louisville, Kentucky, U.S.
- Party: Republican

William Owen Cowger (January 1, 1922 – October 2, 1971), a Republican, served as mayor of Louisville, Kentucky, and as a member of the United States House of Representatives.

== Early life and education ==
Cowger was born January 1, 1922, in Hastings, Nebraska, and attended Hastings High School. He attended one year of university at Texas A&M, finishing his undergraduate degree at Carleton College in Northfield, Minnesota. He took postgraduate studies of political studies for three years at the University of Louisville (in Louisville, Kentucky) and American University (in Washington, D.C.).

Cowger graduated from the United States Naval Reserve Midshipmen's School at Columbia University in New York City, before serving for twenty months in United States Navy, fighting in both the Atlantic and Pacific theaters of World War II.

== Career ==
After his military service, Cowder returned to Louisville, where he became president of Thompson & Cowger Co (a mortgage loan company). In 1953, he was elected president of the Louisville Junior Chamber of Commerce.

=== Mayor of Louisville ===
In 1961, Cowder was elected mayor of Louisville, winning election as the Republican Party nominee. At the time, he was one of very few members of the Republican Party to hold the mayoralty of a large United States city. He served a single four-year term, as state law at the time did not allow him to seek re-election to a second consecutive term..

While mayor, Cowder was elected president of the Kentucky state chapter the Kentucky Municipal League in 1963. He further served as president of the Inter-American Municipal Organization from 1964 to 1965.

For many years, Cowder served as the local Republican Party chairman for Kentucky's 3rd congressional district, as well as a member of the state central committee of the Kentucky Republican Party.

=== Member of the U.S. House of Representatives ===
Cowger was elected to the United States House of Representatives in 1966. He was re-elected in 1968, and served in the House of Representatives from January 3, 1967, to January 3, 1971. As a congressman, he voted in favor of the Civil Rights Act of 1968. Cowger unsuccessfully sought re-election in 1970 while dealing with a fatal illness, but was defeated by Democrat Romano Mazzoli.

=== Later career ===
After his defeat for congressional re-election, Cowger returned to his mortgage business in Louisville. He died less than one year after on October 2, 1971. He was interred at Cave Hill Cemetery in Louisville.

U.S. House of Representatives
| Preceded by Charles R. Farnsley | Member of the U.S. House of Representatives from Kentucky's 3rd congressional district 1967–1971 | Succeeded by Romano Mazzoli |
