= Union Monument in Louisville =

- U.S. National Register of Historic Places
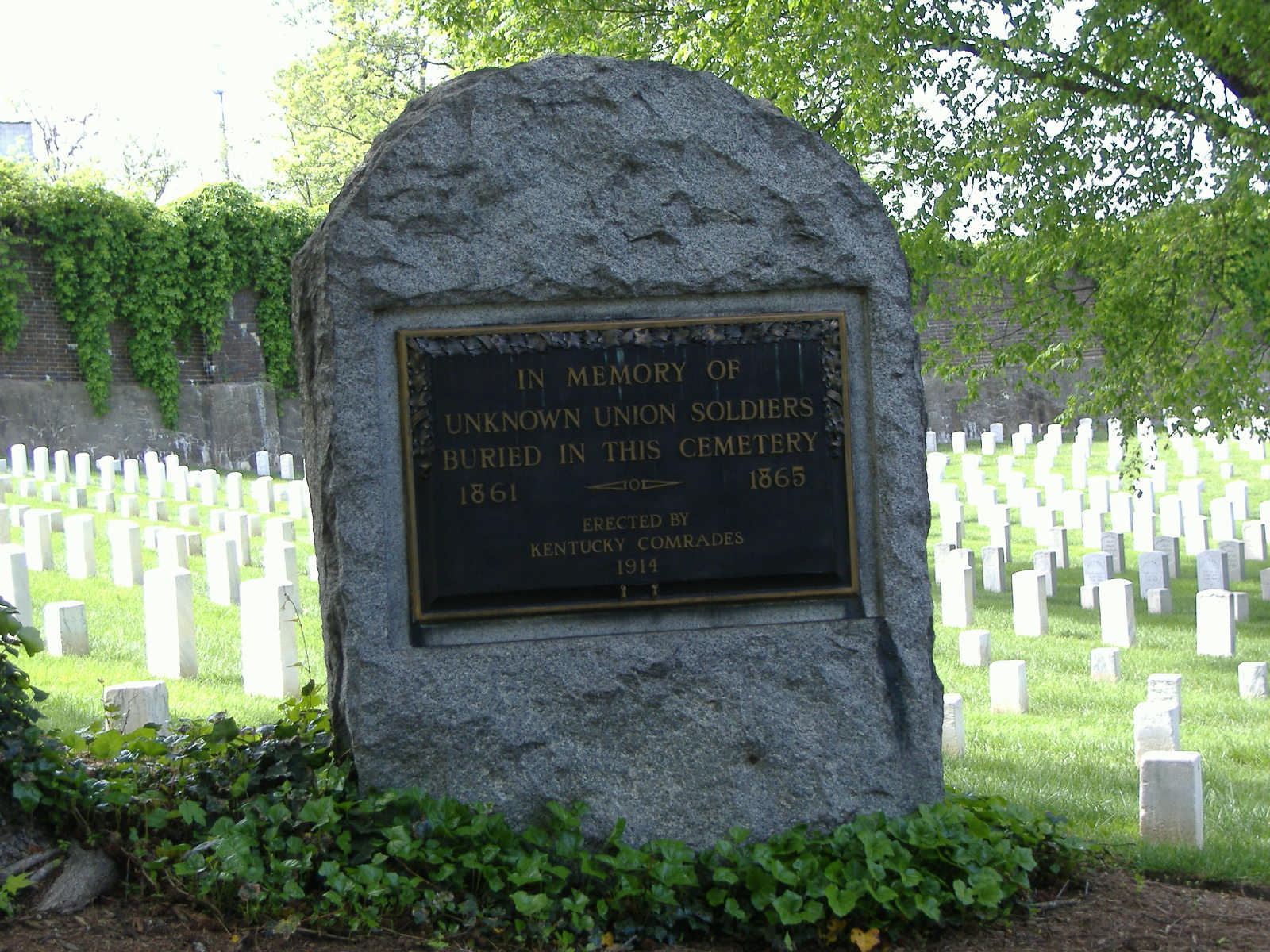
- Louisville Union Monument

- Location within Kentucky Location within the United States
- Location: Within Cave Hill Cemetery, Louisville, Kentucky
- Built: 1914
- MPS: Civil War Monuments of Kentucky
- NRHP reference No.: 97000687
- Added to NRHP: July 17, 1997

The Union Monument in Louisville is located in Cave Hill Cemetery in Louisville, Kentucky. It was built in 1914 from granite, honoring unknown soldiers who fought for the Union during the American Civil War. It is in front of the large number of Union soldiers buried at Cave Hill.

The inscription on the monument reads: "In Memory of / Unknown Union Soldiers / Buried in This Cemetery / 1861 — 1865 / Erected by / Kentucky Comrades / 1914".

The monument was one of sixty American Civil War monuments in Kentucky that were listed together on the National Register of Historic Places in 1997.

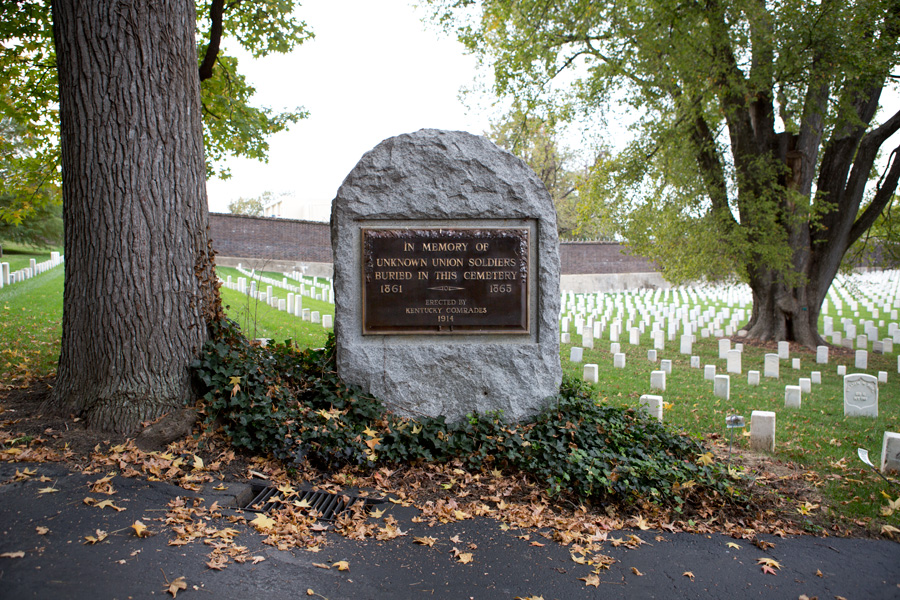
Wider view of the Union Monument

== See also ==
- 32nd Indiana Monument
- Confederate Monument in Louisville
- List of American Civil War monuments in Kentucky
- Louisville in the American Civil War
