= Lost Cause Motors =

Defunct American motor vehicle manufacturer

Lost Cause Motors was an American automobile manufacturer, based in Louisville, Kentucky, from 1963 to 1964. Its founder, Charles R. Farnsley, had previously been mayor of Louisville. To produce the company's only model, he worked with the coachbuilding company Derham Body Company in Rosemont, Pennsylvania.

== Model description ==
The only creation of Lost Cause was a Chevrolet Corvair-based limousine, equipped with all imaginable luxury equipment. The seats and roof were covered with black leather, and the dashboard was made of Kentucky walnut. The instruments in the dashboard were supplemented by an altimeter, a compass, a timer and various fittings for use in rallying. Also included were a picnic set and luggage.

The standard six-cylinder boxer engine with 2376 cm^{3} displacement and 80 bhp (60 kW) power at 4400 rpm could be tuned by John Fitch & Co. to deliver 120 bhp (89 kW), and in this configuration the car reached 185 km/h.
