= John B. Castleman Monument =

- U.S. National Register of Historic Places
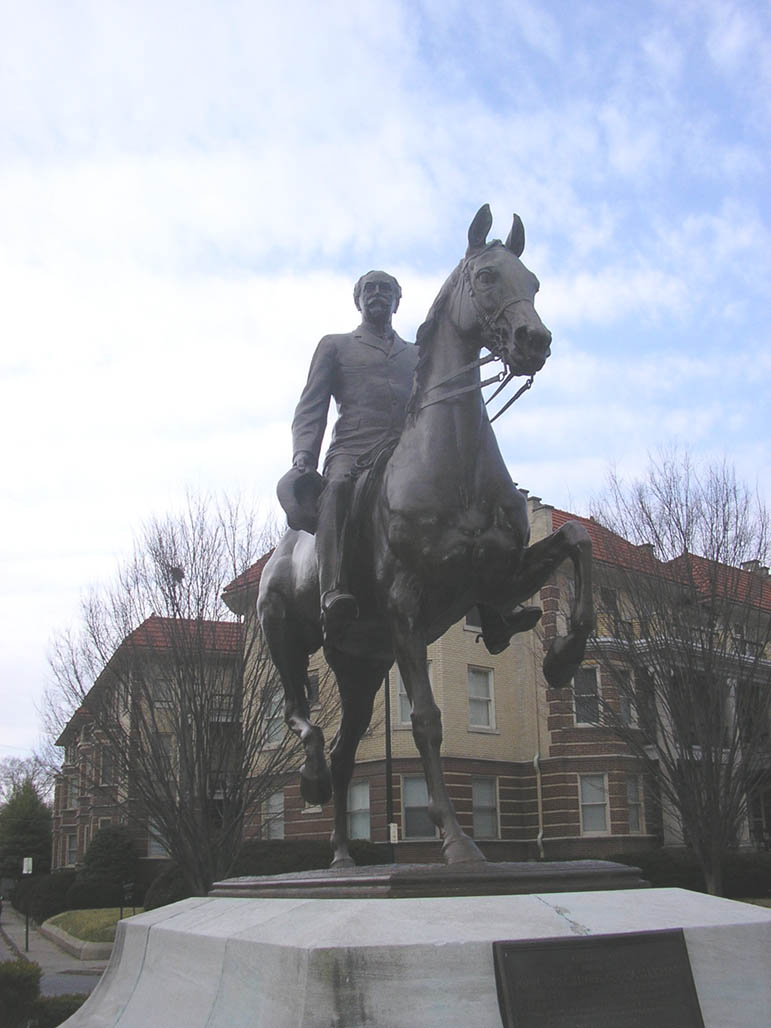

- Location within Kentucky Location within the United States
- Location: Louisville, Kentucky
- Built: 1913
- MPS: Civil War Monuments of Kentucky MPS
- NRHP reference No.: 97000690
- Added to NRHP: July 17, 1997

The John B. Castleman Monument, within the Cherokee Triangle of Louisville, Kentucky, was unveiled on November 8, 1913. The model, selected from a competition to which numerous sculptors contributed, was designed by R. Hinton Perry of New York. The statue was erected to honor John Breckinridge Castleman at a cost of $15,000 by popular subscription from city, state, and other commonwealths. The statue was made of bronze, and rested on a granite pedestal. It stood 15-feet high, with a base of 12×20 feet. The monument was placed on the National Register of Historic Places on July 17, 1997, as part of the Civil War Monuments of Kentucky MPS. There were attempts to remove the statue since January 2019 because Castleman was a Major of the Confederate army. The monument was removed on June 8, 2020, and is pending cleaning and relocation to Castleman's burial site in Cave Hill Cemetery, which has not been done as of May 2025.

== History ==
The Kentucky historical marker near the base of the statue read, on one side, "John B. Castleman-Soldier – Castleman, one of Morgan's men, led attempt in 1864 to free CSA prisoners at Camp Morton. He was imprisoned until the end of the war, exiled, then pardoned by President Johnson. A native of Fayette Co., he came here in 1867. Colonel, Louisville Legion, 1st Regt., Ky. State Guard, reorganized in 1878. Served with 1st Regt. as Brigadier General in Puerto Rico, 1898–99." The other side read, "John B. Castleman-Citizen – After the Civil War, Castleman studied law and graduated from University of Louisville in 1868. Known as Father of Louisville Park System, he was responsible for Cherokee, Shawnee, Iroquois, and Central parks. Castleman also organized and was president of American Saddle Horse Assn., 1892. Appointed Adjutant General by both governors Knott and Beckham."

Castleman served as a Confederate officer during the American Civil War, a U.S. Army officer in charge of the Louisville Legion, and fought in the Spanish–American War.

He founded the American Saddlebred Horse Association and served as its president for almost 25 years. The horse which Castleman rode on the statue was based on his beloved mare, Carolina. His most familiar appearance in Louisville, either at the head of the Louisville Legion or pursuant of his labors as president of the Board of Park Commissioners, was on the back of a five-gaited horse. This monument and the John Hunt Morgan Memorial in Lexington, Kentucky are the only Civil War monuments in Kentucky with equestrians.

Due to his work in developing Louisville's park system, including serving as president of the Louisville Board of Park Commissioners, Castleman became known as the father of the Louisville Park System. He helped create multiple parks, donated land for Cherokee Park, and sold half of his estate to develop Tyler Park. It was not until six years after Castleman's death that the parks became segregated, and nineteen black leaders in Louisville, including William Warley, leader of the Louisville NAACP, signed a letter to the Courier-Journal in 1924 that Castleman “steadfastly refused to allow any kind of racial segregation in the parks of the city” while he was on the park board.

On the night of August 12–13, 2017, the statue and the historical marker near it were defaced with orange paint. The statue was defaced again in February 2018 and a third time in April 2018. At the request of Mayor Greg Fischer, Louisville's Commission on Public Art created the Public Arts and Monuments Advisory Committee which held forums to develop recommendations for handling public artworks that "honored bigotry, racism and/or slavery." The committee made public a draft of their report in June 2018, stating that "A bronze figure towering above a city street gives the impression that the city celebrates the entire life of the figure depicted..." and "Removal is the best option when it is no longer possible to reconcile the monument’s message with the values of the city." The final report was delivered on June 30, 2018, with Mayor Fischer announcing on August 8 that "...the city will be moving the Castleman & [ George D. Prentice ] statues. My decision is based on the findings of our Public Art & Monuments Advisory Committee — Louisville must not maintain statues that serve as validating symbols for racist or bigoted ideology."

In order to remove the statue, the mayor's office was required to first obtain a certificate of appropriateness from the Cherokee Triangle Architectural Review Committee. This was because the statue was located in the Cherokee Triangle Preservation District. However, while convening on the issue on January 23, 2019, the committee arrived at a split vote. On May 9, 2019, the Metro Louisville Landmark Commission ruled that the monument may be removed.

As of June 2019, the movement of the statue had been delayed following suit by several residents, historians, a civil rights activist and the not-for-profit Friends of Louisville Public Art. Filed by Lawyer Stephen Porter who represented the group in district court, the appeal made note of various conflicts of interest in the mayor's review board panel as well as procedural errors that allowed for "the erroneous decision of the Landmarks Commission to allow the removal of the statue of Castleman, once a U.S. Army General, and his American Saddlebred horse Carolina" The decision was overruled in April 2023 by the Kentucky Supreme Court due to a conflict of interest.

As of June 2020, the statue has been removed pending cleaning and relocation to Castleman's burial site in Cave Hill Cemetery, which has not been done as of May 2025.

== See also ==
- Confederate Monument in Louisville
- Louisville in the American Civil War
- List of monuments and memorials removed during the George Floyd protests
