= Bruce Hoblitzell =

American politician (1887–1970)

48th Mayor of Louisville
- In office 1957–1961
- Preceded by: Andrew Broaddus
- Succeeded by: William O. Cowger

Personal details
- Born: June 25, 1887; Louisville, Kentucky, U.S.
- Died: August 11, 1970 (aged 83); Louisville, Kentucky, U.S.
- Resting place: Cave Hill Cemetery; Louisville, Kentucky, U.S.
- Political party: Democratic
- Spouse: Irene Oatley Forbes (m. 1910)
- Children: 3
- Occupation: Real estate agent; politician
- Nickname: Mr. Hobby

Bruce Hoblitzell (June 25, 1887 – August 11, 1970) was mayor of Louisville, Kentucky, from 1957 to 1961. He also served as sheriff of Jefferson County, Kentucky.

== Early life ==
Bruce Hoblitzell was born in 1887, in Louisville, Kentucky. He was raised in Louisville and graduated from duPont Manual High School. He graduated from the Kentucky Military Institute in 1905.

== Career ==
From 1906 to 1912, Hoblitzell worked at the Kentucky Heating Company. He formed the McClellan-Hoblitzell Realty Company with J. A. McClellan in 1912. The company was dissolved in 1919 and became the Bruce Hoblitzell Realtors and Insurance Agency. He was elected sheriff of Jefferson County in 1953. On November 5, 1957, he was elected mayor on the Democratic Party ticket, defeating Republican Robert B. Diehl by about ten thousand votes. He served until November 1961. He was nicknamed "Mr. Hobby".

Hoblitzell was a member of the board and served as president of the Kosair Crippled Children's Hospital for 9 years. He also served as president of the Louisville Board of Trade for three years. He was a director of the Louisville Industrial Foundation and was a board member of the Metropolitan Sewer District from 1937 to 1954. He was also a member of the Mayor's War Housing Committee. He was president of both the Louisville and Kentucky Real Estate Boards.

== Personal life ==
Hoblitzell married Irene Oatley Forbes of Louisville on January 31, 1910. They had a son and two daughters, Bruce Hoblitzell Jr., Mrs. Leo K. Broecker and Mrs. Charles Greenwood. As of 1953, he lived at 1415 St. James Court in Louisville.

Hoblitzell suffered a stroke in December 1962 and remained bedridden. He died on August 11, 1970, at his home in Louisville. Hoblitzell was buried in Cave Hill Cemetery.

== Awards ==
In 1956, Hoblitzell received the Kentucky Medical Association's Auxiliary's first health citation award for his work with the Kosair Crippled Children's Hospital and "for promoting the health and welfare of the prisoners at the Jefferson County jail" while he was sheriff.

Political offices
Preceded by Andrew Broaddus	Mayor of Louisville, Kentucky; December 1957–December 1961	Succeeded by William O. Cowger
