= Charles R. Farnsley =

American politician

Charles Farnsley
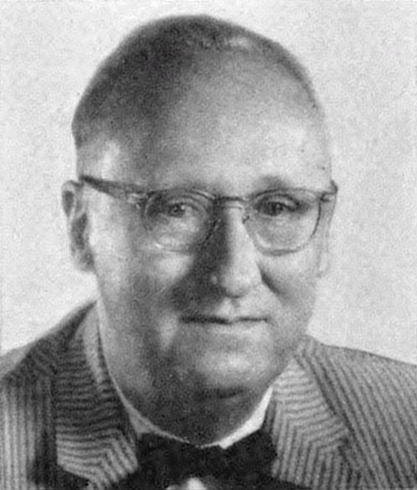

Member of the U.S. House of Representatives from Kentucky's 3rd district
- In office January 3, 1965 – January 3, 1967
- Preceded by: Gene Snyder
- Succeeded by: William Cowger

46th Mayor of Louisville
- In office March 2, 1948 – December 1953
- Preceded by: E. Leland Taylor
- Succeeded by: Andrew Broaddus

Member of the Kentucky House of Representatives from the 55th district
- In office January 1, 1936 – January 1, 1940
- Preceded by: Hugh K. Bullitt
- Succeeded by: Norris McPherson

Personal details
- Born: March 28, 1907 Louisville, Kentucky, U.S.
- Died: June 19, 1990 (aged 83) Louisville, Kentucky, U.S.
- Resting place: Cave Hill Cemetery; Louisville, Kentucky, U.S.
- Party: Democratic
- Education: University of Louisville

Charles Rowland Peaslee Farnsley (March 28, 1907 – June 19, 1990) was an American attorney and politician who served as mayor of Louisville, Kentucky, from 1948 to 1953 and represented Kentucky in the United States House of Representatives from 1965 to 1967. A popular mayor, he received national attention for his eccentric personality and his support for the arts and education. His original ideas resulted in the creation of the Fund for the Arts and weekly “beef sessions” in which residents could talk to him and top city officials directly.

== Early life ==
Farnsley was born in Louisville in 1907 to a well-established family. His father would be elected judge in 1932 and his uncle was a distiller who was active in local Democratic politics. He was a poor student in his time at Male High School and the University of Louisville but graduated with a law degree in 1930 and joined his father's firm.

== Early career ==
Farnsley became a leader of the campaign in Kentucky to repeal prohibition, and was a delegate to Kentucky's convention to pass the 21st amendment.

In 1932, Kentucky's Democratic party leaders endorsed Farnsley to be one of nine nominees for the House of Representatives in state-wide elections, but he came up 2,000 votes short in a bitterly contested primary. He and E. Leland Taylor split the Louisville vote after Taylor ran a campaign against Louisville's Democratic political machine run by Michael J. “Micky” Brennan.

Farnsley lost another primary for Congress in 1934. He won a seat in the State House in 1935, where he served two terms. He supported distilling interests and of Louisville's Democratic machine, asking for a phone on his desk in the legislative chamber because “sometimes I have to call Mike [Brennan] up in a hurry to figure out how to vote on a bill!”

In 1940, after working as a lobbyist for distillers and founding the Rebel Yell brand of whiskey, Farnsley ran against Happy Chandler for the Democratic nomination for Senate. He supported a substantial increase in American aid to Britain and accused Chandler of being an isolationist, but lost badly, saying “tell the voters I am sorry I have been a bother”.

Farnsley was declared ineligible to serve during World War II due to an earlier health issue. He took extensive college classes at the University of Louisville, earning a degree in political science, and did graduate work in public administration at the Universities of Kentucky, Chicago, and Columbia. There, he declared himself a Physiocrat and wrote papers arguing that Enlightenment thought had been inspired by the ideas of Confucius via the Chinese Rites controversy, and that fascism was rooted in the philosophy of Plato.

== Mayor of Louisville ==
In February 1948, Mayor E. Leland Taylor died of a heart attack and the Board of Aldermen was tasked with picking a new mayor. After a chaotic two weeks in which “almost every Democrat who ever figured in public print” in Louisville was considered to be mayor, the Board voted 6 to 5 for Farnsley over Tom Graham, a banker who was backed by the party organization. Farnsley won re-election with around 55% of the vote in 1948 and the same margin in 1949.

Farnsley's first achievement was the passage of an occupational tax, allowing the city to raise revenue both from residents and city workers who lived in the suburbs and decreasing its dependency on taxes on real estate.

Farnsley was noted for his creative solutions to the problems of the growing, cash-strapped city. He came up with the idea to double the amount of road that could be re-paved by only paving the driving lanes and not the parking lanes. His administration scoured the city for vacant areas to put up cheap playgrounds called “tot-lots.”

Farnsley would become an avid opponent of urban renewal and of interstates in cities by the 1970s, but he had more ambiguous positions on the issues as mayor. Under his administration, city officials developed the plans for what would become the Watterson Expressway, I-65 and I-64 in Louisville and cleared an area directly west of Downtown that contained many dwellings lacking electricity and running water.

Farnsley pursued a course of gradual racial integration as mayor. Libraries, golf courses and the University of Louisville (which was then city-controlled) were all integrated under his administration. Farnsley worked behind the scenes as Mayor to attract an unprecedented grant from the Rockefeller Foundation to the Louisville Orchestra. The grant allowed the orchestra to commission and perform 46 new pieces per year and record many of them for records and radio. He provided extra revenue to the Louisville Free Public Library, allowing it to add collections of paintings and recordings that could be checked out as well as college-level classes provided for free over the radio.

Upon his departure from office, the Courier-Journal wrote the following about Farnsley:

To some he is “brilliant,” “a man with ideas,” or maybe even a “touch of genius.” To others he has been in at least some instances “foolish,” “impetuous,” even a “screwball” or worse. There are those who say he has been “the best friend the little man ever had at City Hall.” Not a few think he is “courageous.” Some believe him a “coward” in many matters. But one and all agree Charlie Farnsley has been a spectacular, colorful, unpredictable, unorthodox Mayor who has brought great change in the face and future of Louisville.

== Congress and later years ==
In 1964 Farnsley won a seat in Congress covering Jefferson County with 53.8% of the vote, defeating the Republican incumbent, Marion M. "Gene" Snyder, who later was elected to the House from an adjoining district. In his one term in Congress, Farnsley was among the more liberal members and was a staunch supporter of President Johnson and the Great Society. He did not seek re-election to the House. Farnsley voted in favor of the Voting Rights Act of 1965.

In his later years, Farnsley tried to promote tourism in the Ohio Valley and was president of the Lost Cause Press, which he had founded to reproduce historic documents on microfilm. He became upset with Louisville's trajectory, believing that it had been ruined by urban renewal, interstates, and suburbanization. He feared it would suffer the same fate as Rust Belt cities like Detroit, writing in 1975 that if the local establishment did not change course, “Louisville’s next. I'm not guessing. It’s next! It'll be a ghost town! Empty!” He died in 1990 from Alzheimer's disease and is buried in Cave Hill Cemetery.

== Personal life ==
Farnsley was married to Nancy Farnsley from 1937 until her death. They had five children. Farnsley was Episcopalian.

Farnsley was noted for wearing string bow ties, and, in his earlier career, a broad array of eccentric clothing inspired by the antebellum South. There is a statue of Farnsley sitting on a park bench in front of 623 Main Street in Downtown Louisville.

== See also ==
- Lost Cause Motors – automobile manufacturing company run by Farnsley in 1963–64
- List of public art in Louisville, Kentucky

U.S. House of Representatives
Preceded by Gene Snyder	Member of the U.S. House of Representatives from Kentucky's 3rd congressional district 1965–1967	Succeeded by William Cowger
Political offices
Preceded by E. Leland Taylor	Mayor of Louisville, Kentucky; 1948–1953	Succeeded by Andrew Broaddus
