= Andrew Broaddus =

American politician (1900–1972)

47th Mayor of Louisville
- In office December 1953 – December 1957
- Preceded by: Charles R. Farnsley
- Succeeded by: Bruce Hoblitzell

Personal details
- Born: May 15, 1900 Louisville, Kentucky, U.S.
- Died: September 7, 1972 (aged 72) Louisville, Kentucky, U.S.
- Resting place: Cave Hill Cemetery; Louisville, Kentucky, U.S.
- Party: Democratic
- Education: Centre College
- Military career
- Allegiance: United States
- Branch: United States Navy
- Conflicts: World War I

Andrew Broaddus (May 15, 1900 – September 7, 1972) was mayor of Louisville, Kentucky, from December 1953 to December 1957.

== Life ==
He was born and died in Louisville. After serving in the Navy during World War I he attended Centre College in nearby Danville, Kentucky, but did not graduate, leaving after two years in 1921 to work in his family's laundry business, becoming vice president of it by 1930.

He was elected to the Board of Aldermen in 1933 as a Democrat, and mayor in 1953. His administration is remembered for the Mallon Plan, a failed attempt to annex large portions of Jefferson County, which were beginning to develop quickly as suburbs of Louisville. He also signed an order officially ending racial segregation in Louisville's public parks and pools in 1955.

After his term as mayor, he served as chairman of the Urban Renewal Advisory Committee under mayor Bruce Hoblitzell, and city civil-defense director under Frank W. Burke starting in 1969. He died of a heart attack in 1972 and is buried in Cave Hill Cemetery.

The Mayor Andrew Broaddus a lifesaving station, is named in his honor.

Political offices
Preceded by Charles R. Farnsley	Mayor of Louisville, Kentucky; December 1, 1953–December 1, 1957	Succeeded by Bruce Hoblitzell
