= Phoenix Hill, Louisville =

Neighborhood of Louisville, Kentucky

Coordinates: 38°14′55″N 85°44′20″W

Phoenix Hill is a neighborhood of Louisville, Kentucky just east of Downtown. Its boundaries are Market Street to the North, Preston Street to the West, Broadway to the South, and Baxter Avenue to the East. The Phoenix Hill neighborhood, settled before 1850 by German immigrants, is now a rich tapestry of people and a diverse mix of business, industry and residences. The neighborhood's population is about 70 percent African American.

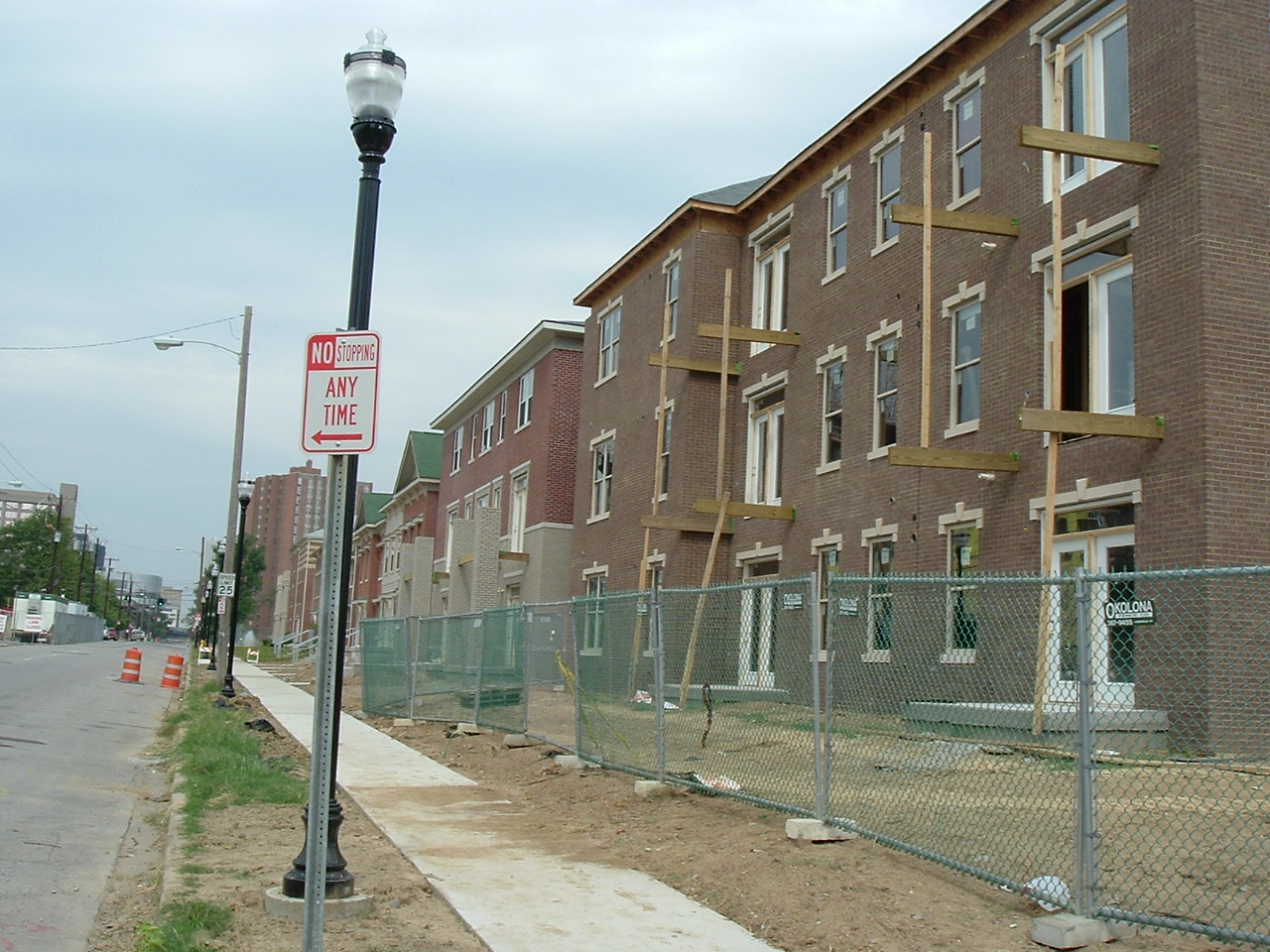
Liberty Green, a mixed-income residential complex under construction.

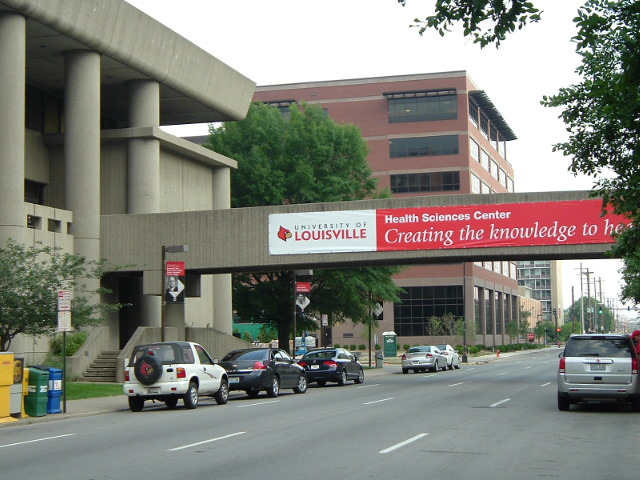
Preston Street on the U of L Health Sciences Campus

It is a neighborhood of mixed but compatible uses. Much of the residential part of the neighborhood is included in the National Historic District. The neighborhood includes: a large medical district, a thriving arts district, a thriving entertainment district, social service agencies and agencies that serve the homeless, small family businesses and larger industry, single-family homes, market-rate apartment complexes and subsidized housing complexes, and new and historic churches.

== History ==
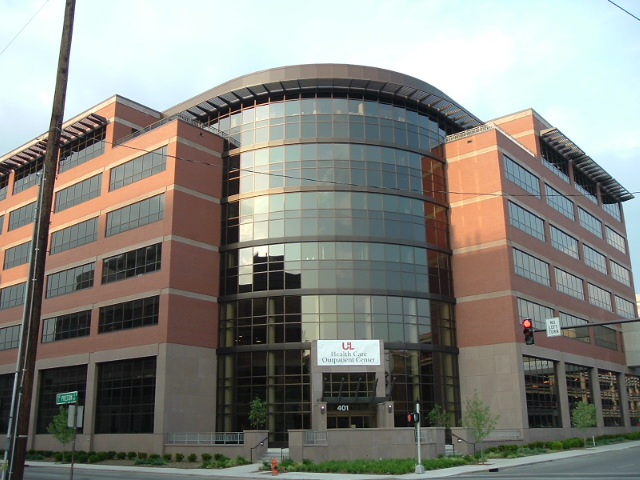
The newly completed Medical Office Plaza on the University of Louisville's Health Sciences Campus

The area was originally known as Preston's Enlargement, part of the land granted to Colonel William Preston in 1774. The area was annexed by Louisville in 1827, known at the time as Uptown, and was densely populated by the time of the Civil War. Some of the Bloody Monday riots occurred in Phoenix Hill near the St. Martin of Tours church.

A triangular portion of the neighborhood bounded by Beargrass Creek was not developed at all before the Civil War. Though a park was built in 1865, most of the land was not developed until the 1890s.

An important local business still continuing in 2006, in one way or another, was the Phoenix Hill Brewery, established in 1865, which also established the nearby park. Orators including William Jennings Bryan and Teddy Roosevelt spoke there before it was closed (partially because of Prohibition) in 1919.

== The Phoenix Hill Neighborhood Association ==
The Phoenix Hill Neighborhood Association was organized in 1975 by local business and community representatives and later restructured to include all segments of the community – as a collateral neighborhood organization dedicated to the revitalization of the Phoenix Hill area of downtown Louisville, Kentucky. The Phoenix Hill Neighborhood Association, Inc. is considered a Charitable, 501-C3, Non-Profit Organization by the IRS.

The Association was integral in the development of two major housing complexes (Phoenix Hill Townhouses and Phoenix Place Apartments) and was responsible for the development of the first Affordable Housing Homearama – showing that a market did exist for new single-family homes in the neighborhood.

== Residential housing ==
=== Shotgun houses ===
The neighborhood's housing stock was heavily composed of shotgun houses, and the residents were predominantly German in heritage, until after World War II, when many left for the suburbs. The houses were left to deteriorate until revitalization efforts began in 1977, when Mayor Harvey Sloane along with the Phoenix Hill Neighborhood Association obtained federal funds for rebuilding. New homes and housing developments were built over the next two decades, refreshing the single-family-housing stock with modernized shotgun houses.

=== Clarksdale Housing Complex ===
The Clarksdale Housing Complex was built in 1939 and was the largest public housing project and first housing project built in the state of Kentucky. It consisted of 58, two and three-story buildings. Clarksdale was one of many developments ran by the Housing Authority of Louisville. Clarksdale's location was bounded by Jefferson Street on the north, Jackson Street on the west, Muhammad Ali Blvd. on the south, and Shelby Street on the east. It was located adjacent to its sister complex, occupied by the majority of elderly tenants and being Louisville's only high-rise housing complex, Dosker Manor. The 65-year-old complex was completely demolished in 2004, as part of the city's plan to redevelop housing in the downtown area. The Dosker Manor high-rise still remains.

=== Liberty Green and The Edge Apartments ===
The Phoenix Hill neighborhood is currently experiencing a revitalization with Liberty Green, a 29-acre, $233 million project, stretching 6 city blocks, and bounded by Jefferson Street on the north, Muhammad Ali Boulevard on the south, Shelby Street on the east and Jackson Street on the west. It is now a composed Mixed-income housing development with many of the residents being former occupants of Clarksdale.

The Edge, at Liberty Green, which is expected to include a 28-unit apartment complex, will be marketed to students in the University of Louisville's medical and dental programs.

== Economy ==
=== Medical district ===
A large segment of the University of Louisville downtown Health Sciences Campus is located in Phoenix Hill, and there are plans that could lead to clinical, educational and research space on the campus, more than doubling in size over the next 20 years.

=== Industry ===
Phoenix Hill is home to a wide variation of industries from the non-profits like New Direction Housing Corporation to the social safety net providing outreach by the St. Johns Day Center for Homeless Men.

== Attractions ==
=== Parks ===
Lucille Grant Park is a 1-acre privately owned public park located adjacent to the New Directions Housing Corporation that they dedicated in July 1997 and named for a prominent gardener in the neighborhood. A playground and picnic area are available for use from dawn until dusk.

Rubel Park is 1.5 acres of green space tucked away in an elevated, triangular area bordered by East Broadway and Barret and Rubel avenues. It has the following amenities: ball field, basketball (half), grills, picnic shelter, picnic tables, and a playground. It is a part of the Louisville Metro Parks system.

=== NuLu ===
The East Market District (also known as NuLu), the home to Kentucky's first green building aptly named The Green Building, has developed within the borders of Phoenix Hill in recent years. A hip new local destination that is an eclectic mix of high-end locavore restaurants, retail stores, and galleries, the district also exhibits an eco-friendly approach to development.

The Phoenix Hill Nulu Farmer's Market, initiated by the Phoenix Hill Neighborhood Association in an effort to curb the food desert plaguing inner-city areas, is located at Fresh Start Growers' Supply. Residents can buy vegetables, fruits, baked goods, and meats that are all-natural and locally grown or crafted.

== Demographics ==
As of 2000, the population of Phoenix Hill was 4,164, of which 24.1% is white, 69.7% is black, 5.6% is listed as other, and 0.6% is Hispanic. College graduates are 14.3% of the population, people w/o a high school diploma are 39.8%. Females outnumber males 55.1% to 44.9%.

== See also ==
- Haymarket
- Phoenix Hill Tavern
