= The Duke's Men of Yale =

Yale University a cappella group

Doox of Yale
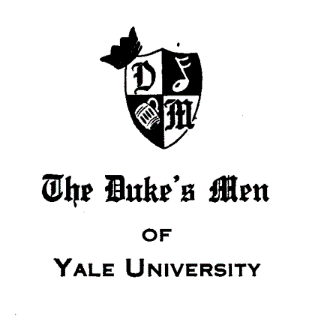
- A Duke's Men crest and letterhead from the 1950s

Background information
- Origin: New Haven, Connecticut, USA
- Genre: A cappella
- Years active: 1952–present
- Members: Tenor I: Alexis Cruz '28; Neslo Atilla '29; Lydia Martel '29; Gabrielle Gittens '30; Caroline Nagayumi '30 Tenor II: Yuki Sugita '28; Hannah Berkowitz '30; Giovanni Fighera '30; Christopher Woods '30 Baritone: Dylan Lee '28; Justin Wright '29; Timmy Leung '29; Henry Goldstein '30 Bass: Bowen Duan '28; Ben Le '29; Frank Hu '30 Business Managers: Ben Le '29; Timothy Leung '29 Pitch: Lydia Martel '29
- Website: http://www.dooxofyale.com

Doox of Yale (formerly The Duke's Men of Yale) are an all-gender undergraduate a cappella group at Yale University. The group was founded by first-year students in 1952, and in 2017, was the first TTBB a cappella group in the 21st century at Yale to become all-gender. (The now-defunct group Augmented Seven did that right after Yale went coed in 1969.)

== History ==
The Duke's Men formed in 1952 when Basil Duke Henning, a former member of the Whiffenpoofs and the master of Saybrook College, stole an arrangement from the 'Whiffs' and presented it to four of his first-year students.

In the fall of 2017, the Duke's Men became Yale's first historically all-male a cappella group in the 21st century to abolish gender restrictions. The group is widely considered to be a feeder to the Whiffenpoofs, and its announcement placed additional pressure on the world's oldest collegiate a cappella group to begin admitting non-male singers; within a year, the Whiffenpoofs followed suit and admitted the group's first female singer in its 109-year history. In 2018, the Duke's Men changed its official name to Doox of Yale, a longtime nickname that better reflected the ensemble's gender inclusivity.

== Competition and Media ==
Doox has been successful in a number of competitions, most notably the International Championship of College A Cappella. In 1996 Doox was the best male group and won first runner-up honors at the ICCA Finals at Avery Fisher Hall in New York City, along with awards for soloist Michael Sagalowicz and arrangement. The same year, the group performed for President Bill Clinton at the White House Christmas party. In 2005, the group took first place in the New England regional final of the ICCA. Most recently, the group took first place in the 2009 Northeast Quarterfinal, with member Sam Tsui ('11) receiving accolades for Best Solo & Best Choreography. and won again at the Northeast Semi-Final at MIT on March 21, and came in 4th place at the Finals at Alice Tully Hall on April 18, 2009.

In January 2004, the group was featured in a CBS News Sunday Morning segment about collegiate a cappella.

In 2006, the Duke's Men recorded a jingle for the CNBC program "Fast Money."

In June 2015, three members of the group (Solon Snider, Wade Newville, and Paul Holmes) were featured on Bravo TV's scripted comedy series, "Odd Mom Out," where they sang a segment of "Give My Regards to Broadway" (arranged by Solon Snider, Pitchpipe 2014–2015).

== Touring ==
Multiple times each year, Doox goes on tour, traveling to cities in the United States and Europe as well as Greece, China, Puerto Rico, Peru, Ecuador, and Ireland in recent years. On tour, the group has performed at venues ranging from classrooms and retirements homes to the Lincoln Center and packed arenas of 10,000 in Chongqing, China.

Doox is also known for its traditional tour through the Borscht Belt chain of resorts each winter.

== Notable Alumni ==
- Richard Brookhiser, historian and journalist
- Django Haskins, singer-songwriter and frontman of pop-noir musical group the Old Ceremony
- Conor Knighton, correspondent for CBS Sunday Morning
- Holcombe Waller, singer-songwriter and visual/performing artist
- Sam Tsui, Musician
- Casey Breves, member of Chanticleer
- Jeremy Lloyd, part of the pop duo Marian Hill
- Henry Gottfried, cast member of Broadway's Cabaret
- Christian Probst, cast member of Broadway's The Book of Mormon

== Discography ==
Over the decades the group has recorded over 30 albums.

Title	Year released
The Duke's Men	1953
The Duke's Men	1954
The Duke's Men of Yale University	1956
The Duke's Men of Yale	1959
Zounds from the Duke's Men of Yale	1961
The Duke's Men of Yale	1963
The Duke's Men On the Road	1965
The Duke's Men	1966/67
The Duke's Men	1968
Brighten Your Night	1971
Istanbul and America	1974
A Waste of Your Time and Money	1976
Da Doox Silver	1978
Off the Record	1980/81
Doox et Veritas	1984
Quality Time	1987
da disc	1990
Hot Donuts Now	1992
Food	1994
Mom	1996
45	1998
Chunda	2000
Instant Gratification	2002
Nobody's Business	2004
D.O.O.X.	2006
Silver&	2007
Gold	2007
A Smooth Ride	2008
What a Trip!	2008
Fifty Five	2008
The Chase	2010
Busted.	2012
The Works	2015
Golden Hour	2017
This Name, Vol. 1	2020
This Name, Vol. 2	2021
Lost and Found	2024
Fever Dream	2026

== Contemporary A Cappella Recording Awards ==
Both Doox and The Duke's Men have received numerous accolades from the Contemporary A Cappella Society's Contemporary A Cappella Recording Awards (CARA).

Year	Category	Nominated Work	Result
2022	Best Mixed Voices Collegiate Arrangement	"Dynamo of Volition" from This Name (Vol. 2)	Runner-Up
2022	Best Folk/World Song	"River" from This Name (Vol. 2)	Nominated
2021	Outstanding Video Editing	"Levels" from This Name (Vol. 1)	Won
2021	Best Mixed Voices Collegiate Arrangement	"Levels" from This Name (Vol. 1)	Won
2021	Best Mixed Voices Collegiate Song	"Levels" from This Name (Vol. 1)	Runner-Up
2021	Best Collegiate Video	"Levels" from This Name (Vol. 1)	Runner-Up
2020	Best Original Song by a Scholastic Group	"One" from One	Runner-Up
2018	Best Jazz Song	"By Your Side" from Golden Hour	Won
2018	Best Male Collegiate Album	Golden Hour	Nominated
2013	Best Original Song by a Scholastic Group	"The One to Walk Away" from Busted.	Nominated
2013	Best Male Collegiate Arrangement	"Singin' in the Rain" from Busted.	Nominated
2011	Best Male Collegiate Solo	"What a Good Boy" from The Chase	Nominated
2011	Best Original Song by a Scholastic Group	"The Quickest Road" from The Chase	Nominated
2011	Best Male Collegiate Arrangement	"Who Loves You/Who's Lovin' You" from The Chase	Nominated
2009	Best Male Collegiate Arrangement	"Umbrella" from What a Trip!	Runner-Up
1997	Best Male Collegiate Song	"I Will Back You Up" from Mom	Nominated
