= End of Love =

End of Love may refer to:

- End of Love (album), a 2005 album by indie rock band Clem Snide
- "End of Love" (song), a song on Anna Abreu's 2007 album Anna Abreu
- End of Love (band)
- End of Love (film), a 2009 Hong Kong film directed by Simon Chung
- The End of Love, a 2012 drama film directed by Mark Webber
- Luv Ka The End (lit. 'The End of Love'), a 2011 Indian comedy film
