= Django Haskins =

American musician

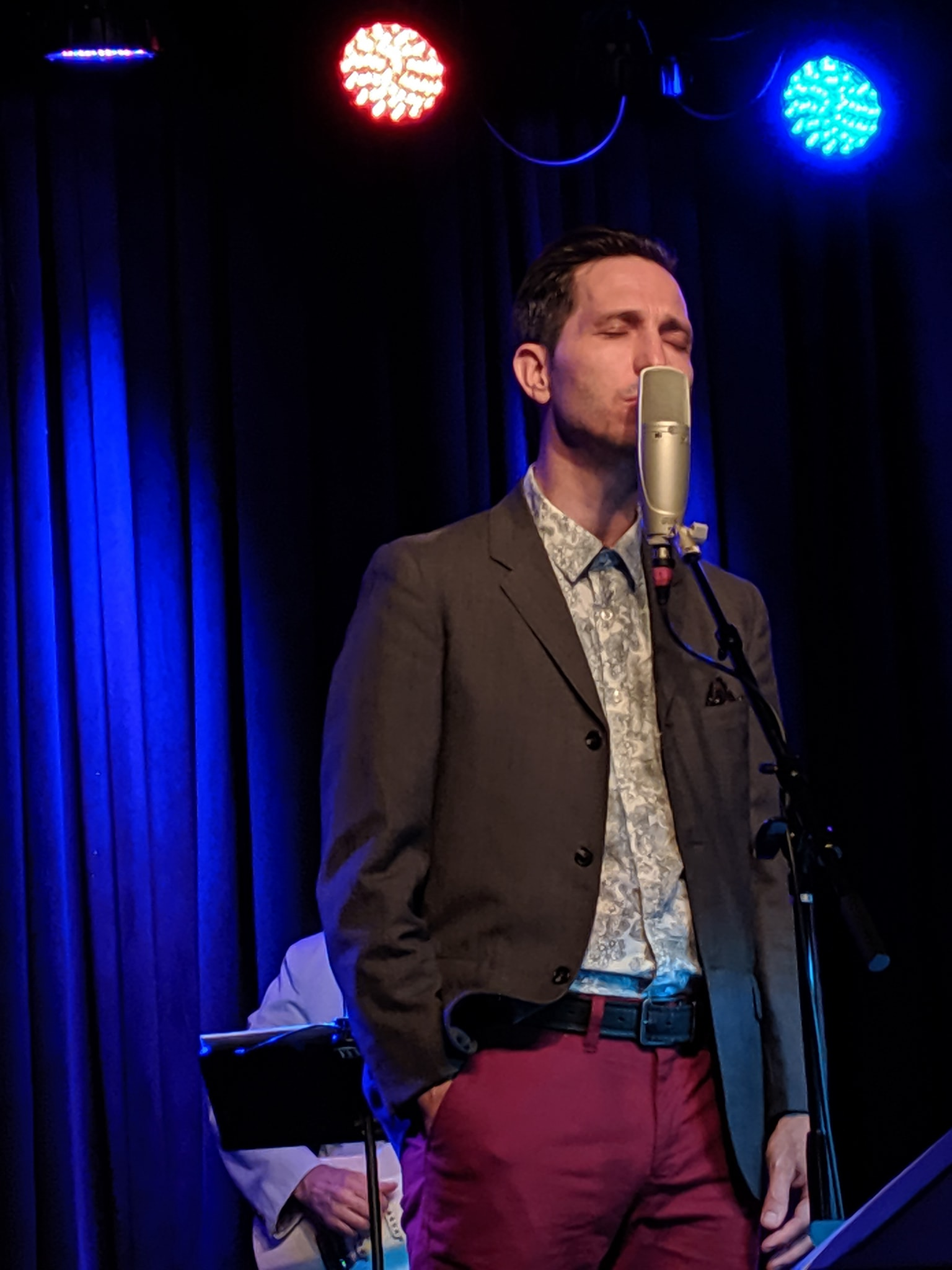
Django Haskins – August 2019 – Cat's Cradle, Carrboro, NC

Djángo Haskins (born November 19, 1973) is a North American singer-songwriter. He is named after jazz musician Django Reinhardt. Originally from Florida, Haskins now resides in North Carolina where he is the frontman of pop-noir musical group The Old Ceremony. Though primarily identified as a guitarist and vocalist, Haskins also plays piano and violin.

== Early life and musical beginnings ==
Haskins was born in Gainesville, Florida. His family's love for music exposed him to the likes of Cole Porter, The Beatles, Bob Dylan, Motown, Gershwin, Thelonious Monk, The Replacements and Elvis Costello, familiarising him with pop music and its many forms. Haskins himself was involved in many middle/high school bands including The Music Butchers, Bloody Awful and The Robot Bunnies from Hell.

He moved north to study literature at Yale before relocating to Hangzhou, China, where he taught English and continued his musical adventure, playing songs he had written to audiences at the local pub who often could not understand a word of what he was playing, gaining him a larger insight to the finer points of song writing. "It takes away all opportunities for in-references, clever lyrics, etc." Django recalls, "and boils it down to melody, rhythm, feel, and sound".

== Solo career ==
In 1996, Django returned to America, setting up base in New York City, releasing his first album, Folding Stars, in 1998, and performing in a number of successful solo shows in various downtown New York institutions.

He formed a band which went on to develop into The Regulars, with bassist and Texas enthusiast Byron Isaacs, and drummer Neil Nunziato, with whom he recorded his second album, Django and The Regulars' Laying Low and Inbetween. It achieved substantial critical acclaim and radio play, resulting in its being picked up by NYC indie label ModMusic Records for national distribution and use in several TV & film projects.

Haskins' third album, Over Easy Smoke Machine, a mix of his solo work and tracks featuring the Regulars, was recorded in NYC and his adopted hometown of Chapel Hill, NC, and released in 2003.

Haskins composed the theme music for The State of Things on North Carolina Public Radio. He currently plays with his pop-noir band, The Old Ceremony, as well as continuing his successful solo shows.

In 2013, Haskins figured prominently in the formation of the progressive musical organization the NC Music Love Army, an activist group of artists co-founded by solo artist and producer Jon Lindsay and Caitlin Cary, of Whiskeytown.

In 2018, Haskins released Shadowlawn, his first solo effort in fifteen-plus years.

== International Orange ==
In 2003, Haskins formed International Orange alongside Robert Sledge (ex-bassist for Ben Folds Five), Britt "Snuzz" Uzzell (former member of Bus Stop) and drummer Jason Fagg (under various alternative aliases). The band played over 100 shows across North America, consisting of songs written by each of the 3 song-writing members (Django, Robert and Britt) before and after the formation of the band. The band released one recording, a six track EP – Spoon Box – in 2004, which featured 2 Django compositions – Folding Stars opener "Hand to Mouth" and new song "Alone". The band parted company in early 2005 to pursue separate projects, though Britt and Robert continued to play together with drummer Eddie Walker in NC cover band Walrus until later that year. The band parted on good terms and are still in touch and it has been suggested that a CD compiled of their many live recordings may someday be released.

== The Old Ceremony ==
While he was still playing with International Orange, Haskins also founded pop-noir extravaganza, The Old Ceremony. Described as a "mini orchestra", The Old Ceremony has been known to consist of up to 12 members, including singer-songwriter Django on vocals and guitar, pianist James Wallace, drummer Dan Hall, Mark Simonsen on the vibes/organ, bassist Matt Brandau, violinists Gabriele Pelli and Daniel Hart, and Josh Starmer on cello. Other members have included Jil Christensen on the accordion, Vamsi Tadepalli on sax, Will Caviness on trumpet, and Harmony Keeney on vocals.

The Old Ceremony released their first recording – a self-titled, 12 track album, featuring fan favorites including "American Romeo", "Ole" and "Blood and Oil" – in 2005. In October 2006, released a new album called Our One Mistake. Songs on this album include "Poison Pen", "Reservations" and "Bao Qian" (a song written almost entirely in Mandarin Chinese). Our One Mistake was released by NYC indie label sonaBLAST! Records (headed by Gill Holland). They have subsequently toured extensively and released four other albums, including two on Yep Roc Records.

== Au Pair ==
In 2013, Django met The Jayhawks' Gary Louris while performing the music of Big Star in Chicago. They hit it off and soon thereafter began co-writing, eventually forming a duo called Au Pair. They released an album, One-Armed Candy Bear, in 2016 on the Nashville label, Thirty Tigers, and played shows in NYC, DC, LA, Chicago, MPLS, Chapel Hill, ATL, and (with Wilco) WV's Mountain Stage. A second album is reportedly in the works.

== Discography ==
=== Solo ===
- Folding Stars (album)|Folding Stars (1998)
- Over Easy Smoke Machine (2003)
- Shadowlawn (2018)

=== Django and the Regulars ===
- Laying Low and Inbetween (2001)

=== International Orange ===
- Spoon Box (EP) (2004)

=== The Old Ceremony ===
- The Old Ceremony (album)|The Old Ceremony (2005)
- Our One Mistake (2006)
- Walk On Thin Air (2009)
- Tender Age (2010)
- Fairy Tales And Other Forms Of Suicide (2012)
- Sprinter (2015)
- Earthbound (2024)

=== Au Pair ===
- One-Armed Candy Bear (2016)

=== Other releases ===
- Boy Gone Wrong (with Pete Galub and the Annuals)
