= Benjamin Arthur =

Benjamin Arthur may refer to:

- Benjamin Arthur (animator) (born 1982), American animator
- Benjamin Arthur (actor) (fl. 2000s–2020s), Canadian actor
- Benjamin Arthur (born 1979) of the Arthur baronets
- Benjamin Arthur (footballer) (born 2005), English footballer
- Ben Arthur, mountain
- Ben Arthur (musician) (born 1973), American singer-songwriter
