= Brooks Young Band =

American rock and blues band

- Origin: Boston, Massachusetts
- Genres: Rock, Blues
- Years active: 2001-2024
- Labels: Currently Unsigned
- Members: Brooks Young; Mike Liane; Chaz Mitchell

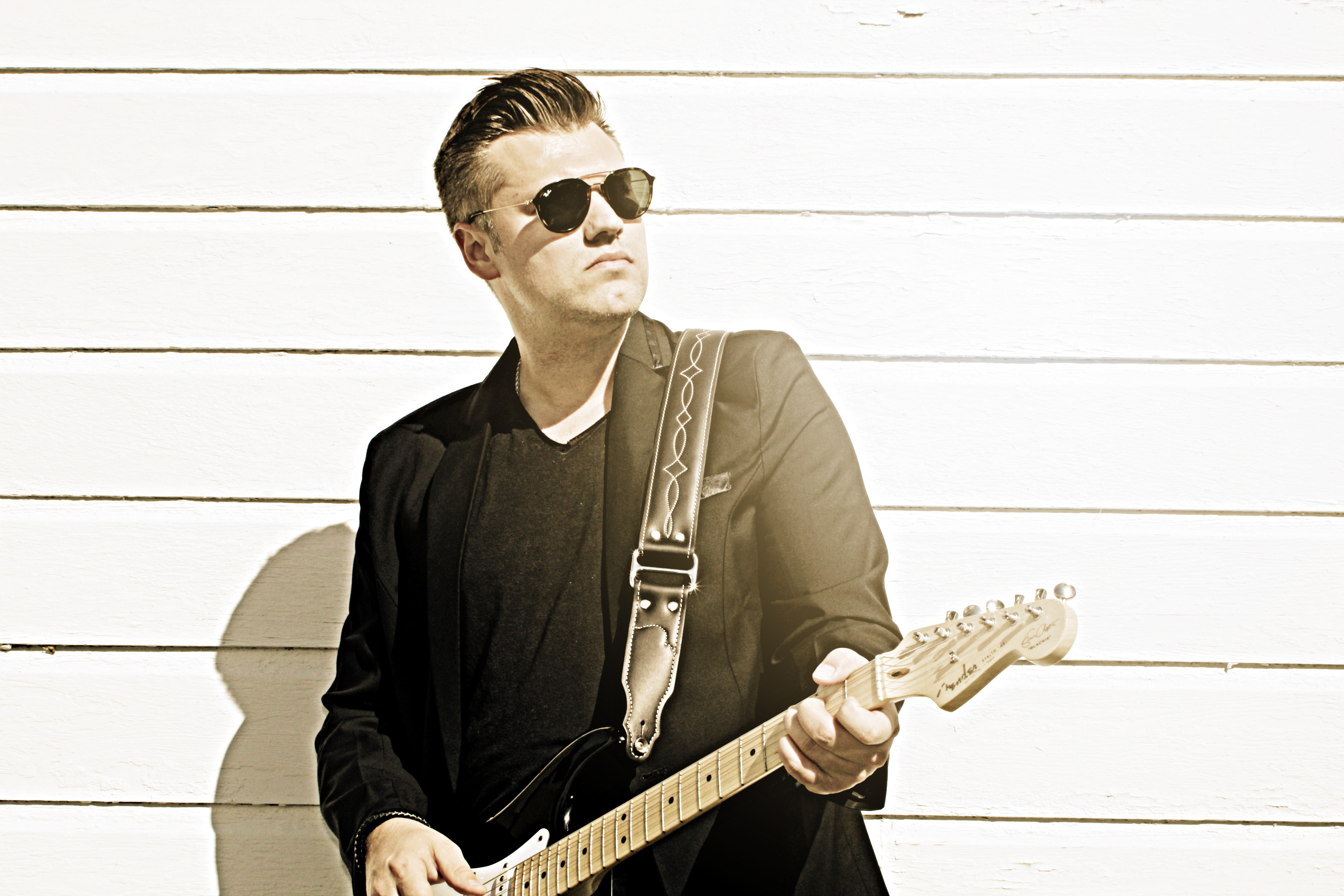
Brooks Young Band

Brooks Young Band is a New England–based rock and blues band from Concord, New Hampshire fronted by lead vocalist/lead guitarist Brooks Young. Current band members include, guitar/backing vocals Mike Liane and bass guitar/backing vocals Charles (Chaz) Mitchell.

In April 2010, the Brooks Young Band released their first full-length studio album entitled Counting Down featuring the guitar work of Gibson Signature Artist Johnny A. on the title track of the album. The album was recorded at Rocking Horse Studio in Pittsfield, New Hampshire.

The Brooks Young Band has performed with notable acts including Grammy Award Winning, King of the Blues B. B. King, blues legend James Cotton, blues harmonica player James Montgomery, Violinist Boyd Tinsley of Dave Matthews Band and multicultural American funk and soul band Robert Randolph and the Family Band, J. Geils of The J. Geils Band, Huey Lewis and the News, Southside Johnny & The Asbury Jukes, Barry Goudreau of Boston and Michael Carabello of Santana.

In 2017 Brooks has added to that list such artists as Blues Great Robert Cray, George Thorogood & The Destroyers, 70's legends 3 Dog Night and Badfinger as well as Woodstock alum 10 Years After."

== Discography ==
=== "What The Night Knows" ===
Released in 2016

1. "We Were Young"
2. "Losing Game"
3. "Make It Through The Night"
4. "Restless"

=== "Time To Fly" ===
Released in 2014

1. "Hero of the Day"
2. "Talk It Up"
3. "Never Thought I'd See You"
4. "You Too"
5. "Dance Alone"
6. "Wasting My Life"
7. "First Slow Dance"
8. "You Don't Know Why"
9. "Breaking Glass"
10. "Hold On to Your Heart"

=== Counting Down ===
Released in 2010

1. "I Believe"
2. "Here For You"
3. "Counting Down"
4. "Back On The Ground"
5. "Last September"
6. "Pushing Up"
7. "Dream Away"
8. "Wake Up Molly"
9. "By My Side"
10. "Forever Now"
11. "Jumpin Jack Flash"

=== Back On The Ground EP ===
Released in 2009

1. "Back On The Ground"
2. "Wake Up Molly"
3. "Dream Away"
4. "Picture"
5. "Last September"

== Death of Brooks Young ==
On Friday, November 8, 2024, Brooks Young was killed in a car crash in Alton, New Hampshire.
