= Gill Holland =

American entrepreneur and film producer

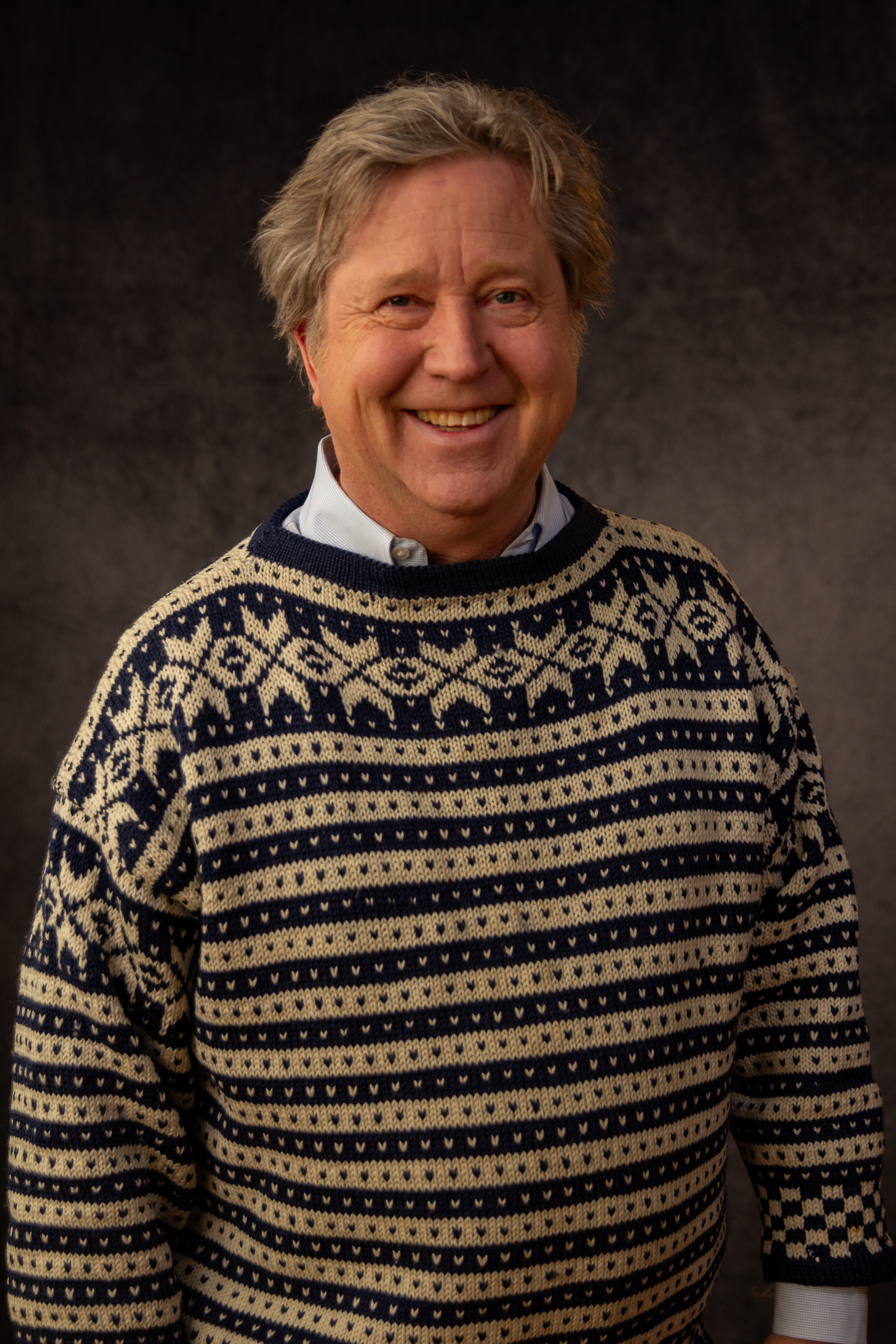
- Holland at the 2025 Sundance Film Festival
- Born: November 7, 1964 (age 61); Chapel Hill, North Carolina, U.S.
- Education: University of North Carolina
- Occupations: Entrepreneur; film producer
- Spouse: Augusta Brown Holland

John Gill Holland Jr. (born November 7, 1964) is an American entrepreneur and film producer. He is the co-developer of The Green Building in Louisville, Kentucky. In 2016 and 2017, Holland was voted Best Entrepreneur in Louisville's LeoWeekly Readers' Choice Awards. In 2017, Louisville Business First honored him with the Excellence in Leadership Award for his successful NuLu redevelopment in the East Market District and current efforts in the Portland neighborhood.

== Early life and education ==
Holland was born in Chapel Hill, North Carolina and raised in Davidson, North Carolina. His father was born in Lynch, Kentucky and grew up in Lynchburg, Virginia. Holland's mother was born in Norway. He was an Eagle Scout and graduated from Episcopal High School in 1983. Holland went on to be a Morehead Scholar and graduated from the University of North Carolina (B.A., 1987; J.D., 1991). He spent his junior year at Paul Valéry University of Montpellier and one semester of law school with Pace University at University College London.

== Career ==
=== Film production ===
Holland moved to New York City in the early 1990s, and after a brief stint at October Films, worked for three years at Unifrance. He later founded cineBLAST! Productions, which The Hollywood Reporter in 1999 and 2000 named one of the top ten production companies in New York City before he sold the company in 2001 at the height of the tech boom.

Holland has served on many film festival panels and juries, including the 1999 Sundance Film Festival short film jury, the Norwegian International Film Festival for the Amanda Award, and the Student Academy Awards (2002 and 2003). He has owned The Group Entertainment since 2005, an independent film production company, which formerly included a talent management business.

Holland has produced more than 150 indie feature films, including Hurricane Streets, which in 1997 became the first film to win three awards at the Sundance Film Festival. Other notable films include Cannes Film Festival selection Inside/Out, the Independent Spirit Awards winner Sweet Land and nominee Dear Jesse (also nominated for an Emmy), the Gotham Awards nominee Spring Forward, FLOW: For Love of Water, which was short-listed for an Academy Award, and 2017 SXSW winner Most Beautiful Island.

=== Record label ===
Holland is the founder of sonaBLAST! Records, an independent record label established in New York City in 2002, which moved with him to Louisville in 2006. The label features Ben Sollee, Nerves Junior, Cheyenne Marie Mize, The Old Ceremony, and Irish singer-songwriter Mark Geary, whose 2004 release Ghosts featuring backing vocals by Josh Ritter and Glen Hansard approached gold status and received critical acclaim in Ireland and the United States. Holland also worked with Jack Harlow on his 2020 EP Sweet Action, whose single "What's Poppin" reached the top 10 on the Billboard Hot 100.

=== Louisville development ===
Together with his wife, Augusta Brown Holland, Holland developed The Green Building. This renovation of a historic building opened in the fall of 2008 in the area that he dubbed "NuLu" in the East Market District. They then went on to landmark and develop almost a block of neighboring historic buildings. Holland is the author of two fundraising art books for children, "Louisville Counts" and "L is for Louisville". Louisville Magazine named him its 2009 Person of the Year.

Holland was named the "Mayor of NuLu" by Louisville magazine NFocus for his efforts in the East Market District, where he also served as president of the NuLu Business Association from 2012 until 2016. In 2013, he turned his attention to the historic Portland neighborhood in western Louisville, where he is working on rehabilitating historic shotgun houses and developing several mixed-use spaces.

By 2020, his Portland Investment Initiative had spent over six years and $35 million constructing new residences and renovating warehouses dating back to the 19th and 20th centuries. Holland offered his own COVID relief to local businesses and tenants by waiving and deferring rent in an effort to keep businesses flourishing in NuLu and Portland.

=== Other ventures ===
Holland is a minority owner of the Forecastle Festival, Louisville City FC, and the famed music recording studio La La Land in Louisville. He is a partner at Harlan County Beer Company in Harlan, Kentucky.

Past and present board and commission service includes Actors Theatre of Louisville, Louisville Film Society, Fund for the Arts, Speed Art Museum, Olmsted Parks Conservancy, Louisville Public Media, Kentucky Film Commission, Governor's School for the Arts, International Bluegrass Music Museum, the Americana Community Center, and the Muhammad Ali Center.

=== Politics ===
Holland ran unsuccessfully for Louisville Metro Council in 2016. He also ran unsuccessfully for Lieutenant Governor of Kentucky with running mate Adam Edelen in the Kentucky gubernatorial election in 2019.

== Selected filmography ==
- Hurricane Streets (1997)
- Inside/Out (1997)
- Desert Blue (1998)
- Dear Jesse (1998)
- Spring Forward (1999)
- Martin & Orloff (2002)
- Dot the I (2003)
- David & Layla (2005)
- Loggerheads (2005)
- Nicky's Game (2005)
- Sweet Land (2005)
- Just Like the Son (2006)
- Mentor (2006)
- Mountaintop Removal (2007)
- Adventures of Power (2008)
- FLOW: For Love of Water (2008)
- Were the World Mine (2008)
- Asylum Seekers (2009)
- The War Boys (2009)
- Bass Ackwards (2010)
- Beautiful Darling (2010)
- The Catechism Cataclysm (2011)
- Big Star: Nothing Can Hurt Me (2012)
- Mariachi Gringo (2012)
- An Honest Liar (2014)
- Most Beautiful Island (2017)
- 7 Splinters in Time (2018)
- Yomeddine (2018)
- Freeland (2020)
- La Restauración (2020)
- Grasshoppers (2021)
- The Unknown Country (2022)
- Last Straw (2023)
- Chaperone (2024)
