= End of Love (band) =

American power pop band

End Of Love
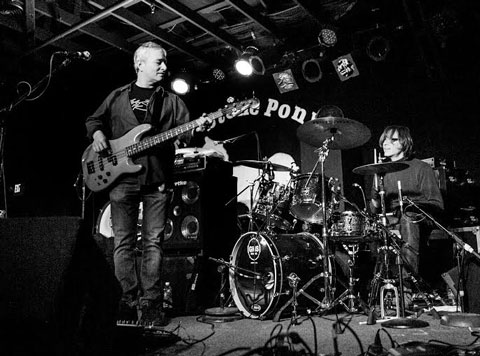
- End Of Love performing at the Stone Pony in Asbury Park, New Jersey

Background information
- Origin: New York City, New York, U.S.
- Genres: power pop, Americana, Indie
- Years active: 2002–2004, 2013- present
- Members: Jody Stephens; Irwin Menken; Jay Deegan
- Website: www.endofloveband.com

End Of Love is a collective of musicians brought together to bring to life the compositions of Jay Deegan, Irwin Menken and Jody Stephens.

== History ==
The project began when Jody Stephens and Irwin Menken met in Europe, Jody was touring with his band Big Star Third and Irwin was on the road with Lee Ranaldo from Sonic Youth. A year later they joined forces and added New York City based guitarist Jay Deegan.

The music reflects their love of straight up Big Star influenced pop songs, the alt- country feel of bands like Uncle Tupelo and add the art rock/noise elements practiced by Sonic Youth and others. Their forthcoming album “Ghosts on the Radio” incorporates all of these elements and draws upon friendships with and admiration for the talented group of musicians who joined them in making this record.

Lead vocals are shared by Skylar Gudasz of Big Star Third, Django Haskins of Old Ceremony, Karlie Bruce of Escort, and Elisa Peimer. Guitar parts are by Jay Deegan and a group of guitarists including Nels Cline of Wilco, Lee Ranaldo of Sonic Youth with additional contributions by Abe Seiferth of Phonograph and Chris Stamey of the dB’s among others. Mikael Jorgensen of Wilco added synth and John Stirratt also of Wilco added backing vocals. The album is produced by Ted Young with assistance from Irwin Menken, Chris Stamey and John Stirratt.

== Project Contributors ==
- Jody Stephens
- Irwin Menken
- Jay Deegan
- Skylar Gudasz
- Django Haskins
- Karlie Bruce
- Elisa Peimer
- Nels Cline
- Lee Ranaldo
- Chris Stamey
- John Stirratt
- Mikael Jorgenson
- Guy Licata
- Abe Seiferth
- Ted Young

== Discography ==
Studio albums

- Ghosts On The Radio (2015; Devise Records)
