= Jamie Block =

American singer-songwriter

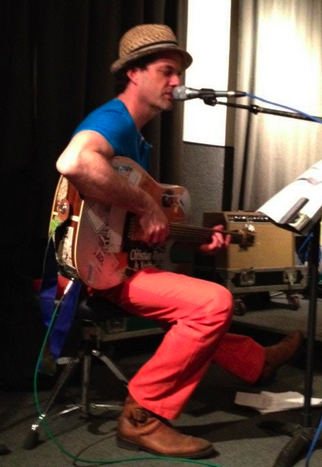

Background information
- Also known as: camsdad1974
- Born: March 13, 1974 (age 51)
- Origin: Long Island, New York; resides New York City
- Genres: Anti-folk, Rock, Indie rock, alternative rock
- Instruments: Vocals, guitar, piano
- Years active: 1996–present
- Labels: SonaBLAST! Records, Capitol Records, Java Records, Zensor

Jamie Block (born March 13, 1974) is a New York City-based musician, known for being a prominent member of New York's anti-folk movement.

== Style and Lyrics ==
Block has been considered one of the early participants in New York's anti-folk movement, a raw and subversive form of folk music that is inspired heavily by punk rock and indie rock. Block includes a multitude of instruments and sounds within each album, including elements of punk rock, electronica, jazz and hip hop. Lyrically, Block focuses heavily on personal experiences and observations living in New York City.

== Early career ==
Block grew up on Long Island, New York. He went to college to study English in Chapel Hill, North Carolina, but dropped out and relocated to New York City, where he began his music career as a subway busker. In 1996, Block self-released his debut album, Lead Me Not into Penn Station, which was well received by critics. In reviewing the album, Laurel Bowman of Alternative Press wrote that Block "practices the alchemy of melodious discord: pretty enough to draw you in, rough enough to keep you listening." The CD included CD-ROM content, including video clips, song lyrics, photos and a New York City guide. Block released a music video for the album song "Rhinoceros," which was broadcast on cable network MTV2.

== Timing Is Everything ==
The positive reception for Penn Station helped Block book tours opening for The Brian Setzer Orchestra, Bob Mould, and They Might Be Giants, garnering notice from producer Glen Ballard. In 1998, Ballard, (known for co-writing and producing Alanis Morissette's album Jagged Little Pill) started the Capitol Records imprint Java, and chose Block to be the first signed artist. Java released Block's second album, Timing is Everything, on October 6, 1998. The album was generally very well received by critics, with Karen Iris Tucker of Time Out New York calling the album "stellar" and Matthew S. Robinson of The Boston Globe stating that the album is "tight, important and definitely well-timed." Following the album's release, Block toured with a full band, including Mark Hutchins on drums and John Abbey on bass.

Several songs from the album appeared in feature films. "Rhinoceros" was featured in the 1999 romantic comedy Blast from the Past, "I Used to Manage PM Dawn" was featured in the 1999 Mary Lambert film Clubland, and Block's cover of the Perry Como song "Catch a Falling Star" was used in the opening credits for the 1999 romantic comedy Never Been Kissed.

== Departure and Reemergence ==
Despite being well received critically, the album did not sell as much as expected, and Block was dropped from Java records. He ended up pursuing a career on Wall Street, getting a job as a financial advisor at a Manhattan investment firm. In the mid-2000s, he reportedly got interested in making music again after hearing one of his songs on Fordham University's non-commercial radio station WFUV. He connected with and was interviewed by WFUV DJ Claudia Marshall, who inspired him to record new material.

In March 2006, Block released this third album, The Last Single Guy, on indie label SonaBLAST! Records. Like his previous albums, it was critically well-received, with Jo-Ann Greene of Allmusic calling the album "enthralling" and noting that "like a bedside book, this album can be played in one sitting, but so much better to dip in and out of it over time, letting one's mood determine one's favorites for the day." Claudia Marshall of New York-based noncommercial radio station WFUV included the album in her "Best of 2006" list.

== Whitecaps on the Hudson ==
In February 2013, Block released his fourth full-length album Whitecaps on the Hudson. The album was produced by Dean Sharenow and was recorded at New York City recording studios Excello and Steel Cut Audio. Featured musicians include bassist Byron Isaacs of New York-based folk band Ollabelle, guitarist Erik Della Penna who has recorded with Natalie Merchant and Joan Baez, and bassist Jeff Hill who was recorded with Rufus Wainwright.

The album has generally been praised by critics. In a positive review, critic Nick DeRiso stated that songs on the album "blend the brutal, hard-won spoken-word honesty of Lou Reed with a rootsy, rattling cadence" and said that Block is a "vocalist capable of subtle, deeply emotional complexity." Journalist Steven P. Marsh noted the personal nature of the songwriting, stating that the songs on the album "are perfectly crafted stories of a man whose life has had some twists and turns."

Block has announced a tour of the Northeastern United States to support the album's release.

== Abby Singer-Songwriter ==
In 2015, Block starred in, and co-wrote the feature film, Abby Singer-Songwriter, in a collaboration with the independent filmmaker Onur Tukel.

In "Abby Singer/Songwriter," Jamie Block plays himself, as a divorced stockbroker has-been who was once an indie-rock star signed to Capitol Records who meets Onur Tukel, a hapless middle-aged filmmaker who has just moved to Brooklyn. In this coming-of-middle-age story, Onur persuades Block to sink his money into a series of increasingly absurd music videos to promote his comeback as a musician. Desperate to impress his two beautiful, nonchalant teenaged daughters, Block casts them in the videos, which then play on multiple screens throughout this hallucinatory film. As tension mounts between director and musician Block's bank account and grip on reality dwindle.

Bedford and Bowery called the film, a "No-Budget, Poor Man's Birdman," while The New York Times' and Brooklyn Magazine named Abby Singer-Songwriter as a "Highlight" and "Best Bet" for the 2015 Brooklyn Film Festival.

The film premiered internationally at the 2015 CIMMFest, had its East Coast premiere at the 2015 Brooklyn Film Festival, and had an extended festival run at festivals including Northside Festival, Lighthouse International Film Festival, and Buffalo International Film Festival where it won Special Jury Prize for Festival Feature.

== Discography ==
Albums
Title	Album details
Lead Me Not into Penn Station	Released: 24 September 1996; Self-released
Timing Is Everything	Released: 6 October 1998; Label: Capitol Records, Java Records
The Last Single Guy	Released: 14 March 2006; Label: SonaBLAST! Records
Whitecaps on the Hudson	Released 19 February 2013; Self-released

== Filmography ==
Year	Film	Credited Producer	Credited screenWriter	Credited Actor	Credited Role	Notes
2015	Abby Singer-Songwriter	Yes	Yes	Yes	Jamie Block	
2017	Black Magic for White Boys	Yes		Yes	Magician's Assistant	
