= East Market District, Louisville =

Area of Louisville, Kentucky, United States

Coordinates: 38°15′11″N 85°44′17″W

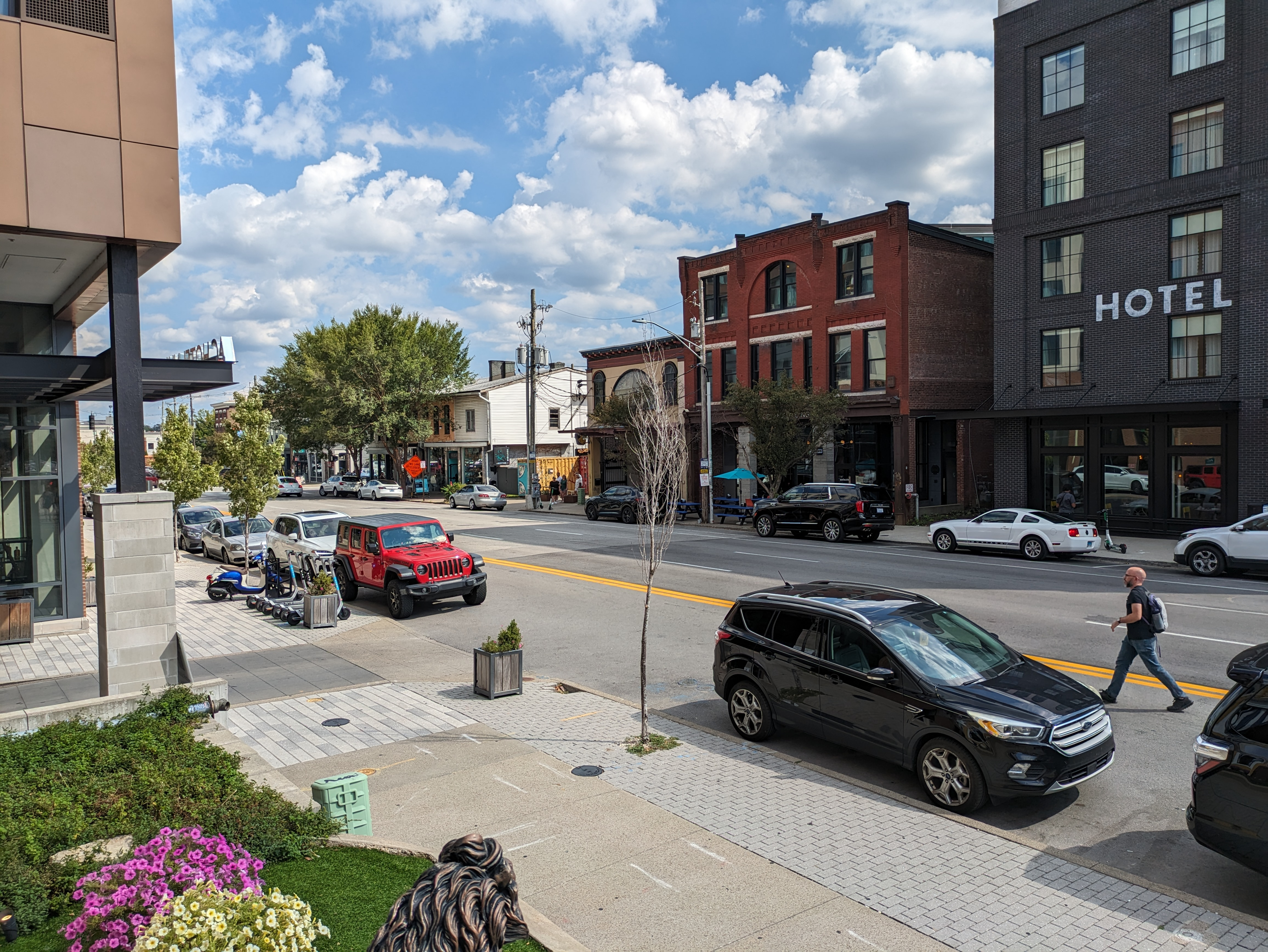
East Market District

The East Market District, colloquially referred to as NuLu (a portmanteau of "New" and "Louisville"), is an unofficial district of Louisville, Kentucky, situated along Market Street between downtown to the west, Butchertown to the north, Phoenix Hill to the south, and Irish Hill to the east. The area is home to schools, churches, large and small businesses and some of the city's oldest homes and businesses. A destination since Louisville's founding, Market Street has played host to a variety of businesses throughout the city's history that have drawn Louisvillians for generations to its addresses.

The district is today well known for its galleries showcasing local, regional and national artists, unique specialty stores, antique shops and a growing number of upscale restaurants. While multiple art galleries are located in Louisville, they are especially concentrated in this district. Keeping with the sustainable culture of NuLu, many of its restaurants offer organic and locally sourced ingredients. The district also houses numerous architecture firms, antique stores, advertising and media agencies, a record label, film production group, publishing company, designers and more.

== History and architecture ==
The area that is now NuLu was originally part of a 1,000-acre (4.0 km^{2}) Royal land grant to Col. William Preston for his service during the French and Indian War. In 1827, the area was annexed by the city of Louisville under the name of "Uptown". Around 1832, Market Street's eastern terminus was occupied by the Woodland Gardens, a green oasis of amusement and entertainment in the growing city that became a favorite gathering spot with German immigrants. The gardens themselves gave way to the Bourbon Stockyards when it closed in 1880, which helped fuel early growth of meat purveyors, tanners and other industries associated with the livestock trade, including the establishment of five Market Houses that populated the street. Two of these could be found in today's East Market District: the Shelby Market, between Campbell and Shelby Streets, and the Preston Market between Preston and Floyd Streets.

From the early 1960s until the early 2000s, ten buildings on the 800 block of East Market area were owned by Wayside Christian Mission and used as the main housing campus for homeless women and families (men are still housed at a location on Jefferson Street). Eventually businesses in the area, led by antiques dealer Joe Ley, put pressure on the homeless shelter by opening a hearing process for Wayside's buildings to be added to the historic register, forcing Wayside to halt necessary renovations to its buildings. After months of stalled construction, Wayside Christian Mission sold its Market Street property and moved to a new location at 2nd and Broadway. Investors bought the ten properties for renovation, and hearings to add the buildings (some built as recently as the 1980s) to the historic register were called off.

=== Haymarket ===
The Haymarket area, which occupied most of the blocks around Jefferson, Market, Floyd and Preston streets, had a long and ethnically rich history, says University of Louisville archivist Dr. Tom Owen. "Dating as far back as the late 1800s an open-air market was operated here by vendors of varied national heritage," he says. "At that time the Haymarket extended from Preston Street to Second Street and was the center for the majority of the produce traded in the city." The first blow to the Haymarket's produce-market predominance came in 1955, when several fruit vendors and produce companies, including Horton Fruit, Al Campisano Fruit, and the Hill and Sloan, S&S, and Clarence Mayfield produce companies formed the Louisville Produce Association and moved from East Liberty Street to Bishops Lane. The original Haymarket buildings were demolished in the late 1950s as part of an urban renewal initiative, but a new Haymarket was constructed in the 1960s and expanded several times over the next two decades.

=== Architecture and design ===
The creator of New York City's Central Park and father of Louisville's original parks system, Frederick Law Olmsted, designed two parks that replaced the original Market Houses, with the mini-parks themselves later replaced by traffic lanes.

Designated in 1983 as part of the Phoenix Hill National Register Historic District, the area has a rich blend of architectural styles, ranging from pre-Civil War federal style town-homes and shotgun houses, to Italianate and Victorian residential and commercial structures, as well as large pre and turn of the 20th century buildings built to house Louisville's thriving businesses during the boom following the Civil War. Many of these buildings are today home to the many galleries, shops, restaurants and residents in the district. This includes Louisville's first commercial building seeking national LEED platinum certification as a green structure, known as The Green Building, located in a 110-year-old former dry goods store.

What may be called the flagship building of NuLu is The Green Building. It was originally built in 1891 by Sternau's Dry Goods and was used as a dry goods store until it closed in 1949. It has since been used as a Goodwill Thrift Store (1956–1977) and a photography warehouse (1977–2006). In 2006, Gill and Augusta Holland purchased the building and began a dramatic renovation to try to achieve LEED Platinum Certification. The Green Building earned LEED Platinum Certification in 2010, becoming Louisville's first commercial LEED Platinum structure and Kentucky's first LEED Platinum adaptive reuse structure. Holland coined the term NuLu.

== Events ==
Galleries, museums and other businesses in the East Market District as well as the West Main District are prominently featured during the monthly First Friday Hop, where free buses circle the downtown area with stops at most galleries and museums along its route.

The NuLu East Market Festival is an annual event designed to showcase what the neighborhood and city of Louisville have to offer. Originally held September 26, 2009, the festival featured local vendors, food booths, beer and wine sales and a musical lineup featuring Ben Sollee.

== In popular culture ==
Market Street often played host to Academy Award winning pioneer movie director, D. W. Griffith, a native of nearby Oldham County, Kentucky, whose family had moved to Louisville where D.W. began work for the Meffert Stock Company. This touring theater group was led by William H. Meffert, whose family had lived and worked in the 800 block of East Market Street from the 1850s through the 1960s. Writer and director Cameron Crowe chose the East Market District to shoot scenes for his 2005 film Elizabethtown, starring Orlando Bloom and Kirsten Dunst.

== See also ==
- West Main District, Louisville
- List of attractions and events in the Louisville metropolitan area
