= Phoenix Hill Tavern =

Defunct Kentucky music venue

Coordinates: 38°14′40.6″N 85°43′40.8″W

The Phoenix Hill Tavern was a live music venue located in Phoenix Hill, Louisville, Kentucky. It won LEO Weekly's "Best of Louisville" award for eight consecutive years. Opened in 1976, the club closed in 2015, and was demolished in 2017. The tavern began as one room in a rundown warehouse, eventually expanding to 25,000-square-foot facility. In the 1980s, WLRS-FM would arrange special Christmas season broadcasts for its Bridge the Gap drive for the needy. Phoenix Hill Tavern hosted famous artists from many different genres, including Meat Loaf, Miley Cyrus, Blues Traveler, Foghat, Tori Amos, Kansas, Blue Öyster Cult, the Jesus Lizard and the Kelley Deal 6000.
