= Meteor Shower (play) =

Play by Steve Martin

- Written by: Steve Martin
- Genre: Comedy
- Setting: 1993

Premiere
- Date premiered: August 2016
- Place premiered: Old Globe Theatre, San Diego, California

Meteor Shower is a 2016 play written by Steve Martin. The play, a comedy, is set in 1993 in Ojai, California. It premiered on Broadway in 2017. Amy Schumer received the production's sole Tony Award nomination.

== Plot ==
In 1993, a meteor shower occurs in Ojai, California. Corky and her husband Norm invite another couple for dinner, Gerald and Laura. Over the course of the evening, Gerald and Laura are belligerent and aggressive.

== Cast and characters ==
Character	San Diego debut	Broadway Debut
Character	2016	2017
Corky	Jenna Fischer	Amy Schumer
Gerald	Josh Stamberg	Keegan-Michael Key
Laura	Alexandra Henrikson	Laura Benanti
Norm	Greg Germann	Jeremy Shamos

== Productions ==
The play had its world premiere at the Old Globe Theatre, San Diego, California in August 2016. The director was Gordon Edelstein with the cast that featured Alexandra Henrikson, Josh Stamberg, Greg Germann as Norm, and Jenna Fischer as Corky. The play then ran at the Long Wharf Theatre, New Haven, Connecticut in October 2016. The director was again Gordon Edelstein, with the cast that featured Arden Myrin as Corky, Patrick Breen as Norm, Josh Stamberg, and Sophina Brown.

The play premiered on Broadway on November 1, 2017, in previews, officially on November 29, 2017, at the Booth Theatre. Direction is by Jerry Zaks, with scenic design by Beowulf Boritt, costumes by Ann Roth and lighting by Natasha Katz. The original Broadway cast features Keegan-Michael Key as Gerald, Amy Schumer as Corky, Laura Benanti as Laura, and Jeremy Shamos as Norm. This marks Schumer and Key's Broadway debuts. The play closed on January 21, 2018.

== Response ==
=== Critical reviews ===
Charles McNulty, reviewing the play at the Old Globe, San Diego, wrote: "Meteor Shower plunges into the absurd without establishing a philosophical grounding for the mania. It's sitcom Ionesco crossed with a Saturday Night Live parody of Edward Albee's Who's Afraid of Virginia Woolf?".

Allison Adato of Entertainment Weekly reviewer wrote of the Broadway production that Meteor Shower is "a very funny play. Keening-like-a-howler-monkey funny. Design-a-new-cry-laughing-emoji funny. What it is not, however, is a substantial play...All four actors enjoy a share of the silliness, which they put over ably in black-out scenes that tell and retell variations of the evening’s events. But the night belongs to Schumer, her timing, her mugging, her deftness with some extremely ridiculous gags."

== Awards and nominations ==
2018 Original Broadway Production

Year	Award	Category	Nominee	Result
2018	Drama League Awards	Outstanding Production of a Broadway or Off-Broadway Play		Nominated
2018	Drama League Awards	Distinguished Performance Award	Laura Benanti	Nominated
2018	Drama League Awards	Distinguished Performance Award	Amy Schumer	Nominated
2018	Tony Awards	Best Actress in a Play	Amy Schumer	Nominated
