= Builder of the House =

American folk pop band, founded 2011

- Origin: Portland, Maine, United States
- Genres: Folk pop, indie folk
- Years active: 2011–present
- Labels: sonaBLAST! Records
- Members: Rob Cimitile; Elliot Heeschen
- Website: builderofthehouse.com

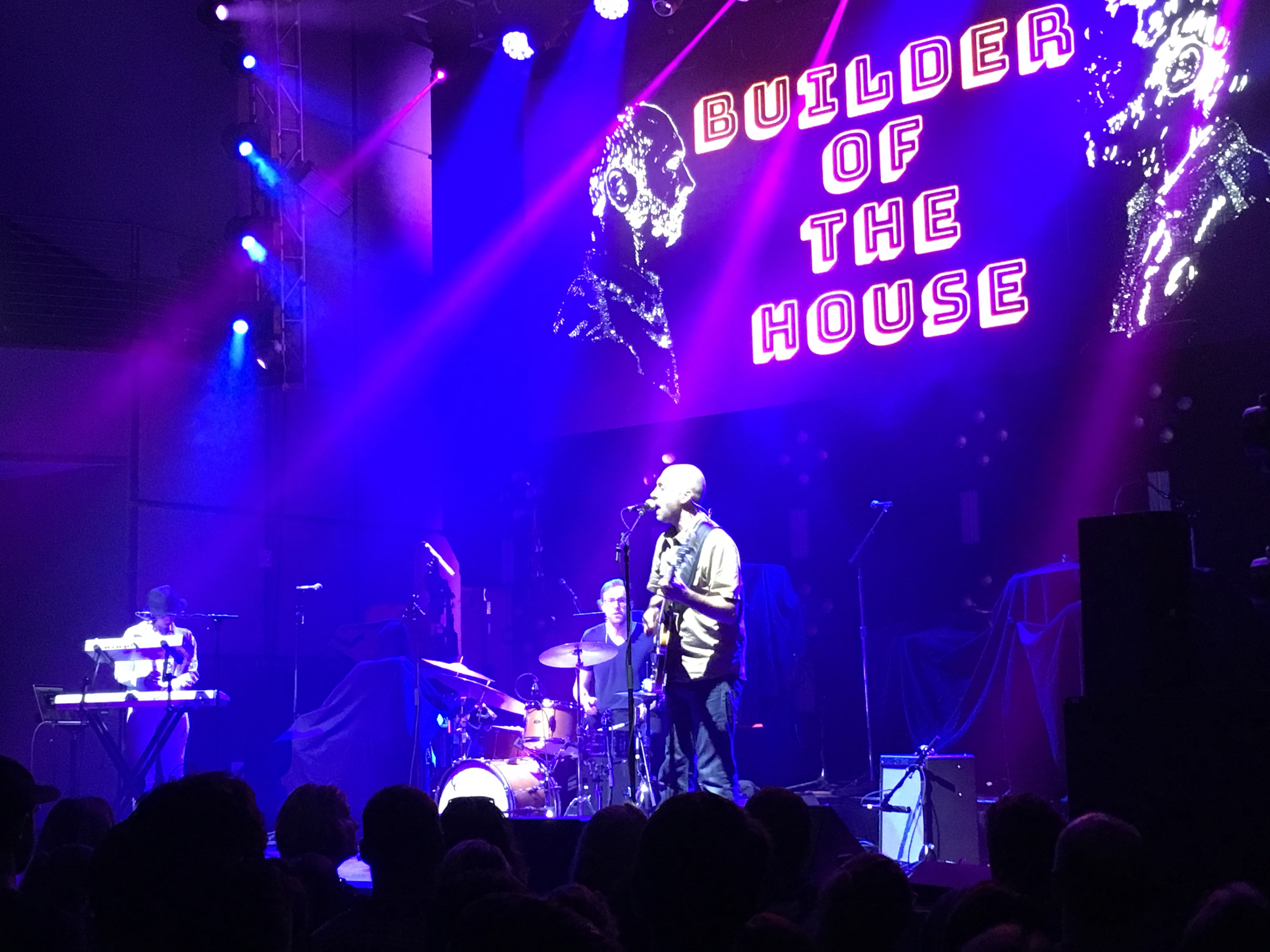
American Folk Pop band Builder of the House performing at Aura in Portland, ME

Builder of the House is an American folk pop band formed in Portland, Maine, in 2011, consisting of lead vocalist and guitarist Rob Cimitile and drummer Elliot Heeschen. Cimitile began performing under the name Builder of the House in 2010, but the group was cemented after Rob and Elliot met as members of a Zimbabwean marimba band. The band's musical style includes elements of Americana, roots, folk, and African music in a modern pop idiom augmented with electronic sounds.

In performance, the band utilizes live looping, samples, and synthesizers, as well as acoustic instruments. The band has opened for Kaleo (band), Dylan LeBlanc, Pearl and the Beard, and Kristeen Young.

According to Rob Cimitile, the band's name is derived from a Buddhist parable about the root of human suffering.

Since the release of two EP's and their first full-length album, Ornaments (sonaBLAST! Records 2017), the band's music has been featured several films including Don't Think Twice, Better Start Running, and Totem.

Music videos for the songs "There Is No Hourglass, Only Sand" and "Look at the Man" have received acclaim at music award shows and domestic and international film festivals.

== Discography ==
Album	Year released	Label	Notes
I Am a Tidal Wave	2012		All songs written, recorded and produced by Rob Cimitile. Claps in "My New Eyes" recorded at Rocking Horse Studio. Mixed by Noah Cole/Artifex Studio and Brian Coombes/Rocking Horse Studio. Mastered by Alan Douches/West West Side Music.
Hourglass	2015	SonaBLAST! Records	Recorded and mixed at Acadia Recording Company; mastered by Jack Murray at Odds Are Studios
Ornaments	2017	SonaBLAST! Records	Recorded and mixed at Acadia Recording Company; mastered by Pat Keane Mastering

== Press ==
Featured artist on SoundCloud and ReverbNation.

CD Baby DIY Musician Blog.
