= Laura Benanti =

American actress and singer (born 1979)

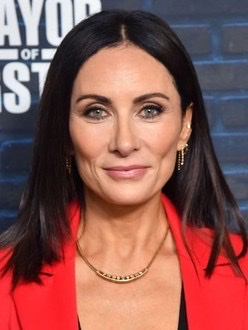
- Benanti in 2025
- Born: Laura Ilene Vidnovic; July 15, 1979 (age 47); New York City, New York, U.S.
- Occupations: Actress, singer
- Years active: 1998–present
- Notable credits: Gypsy; Women on the Verge of a Nervous Breakdown
- Spouses: Chris Barron (m. 2005; div. 2006); Steven Pasquale (m. 2007; div. 2013); Patrick Brown (m. 2015)
- Children: 2
- Website: www.laurabenanti.com

Laura Ilene Benanti (née Vidnovic; born July 15, 1979) is an American actress and singer.

Benanti made her Broadway debut as an ensemble member and later as Maria von Trapp in the 1998 revival of The Sound of Music. Benanti went on to win the Tony Award for Best Featured Actress in a Musical playing Louise in the revival of Gypsy (2008). She was Tony-nominated for her roles in Swing! (2000), Into the Woods (2002), Women on the Verge of a Nervous Breakdown (2010), and She Loves Me (2016). Her other notable Broadway roles include Nine (2003), In the Next Room (2009), Meteor Shower (2017), and My Fair Lady (2018).

On television she has had roles as Lauren Bennett on the NBC sitcom Go On (2012–2013), Sadie Stone in the ABC musical drama series Nashville (2014–2015), Alura and Astra in the CBS series Supergirl (2015–2016), Edie Randall in the TBS comedy The Detour (2017–2019), Kiki Hope in the HBO Max revival Gossip Girl (2021–2023), and as Susan Blane in the HBO drama series The Gilded Age (2023).

From 2016 to its 2026 end, she had a recurring role as First Lady Melania Trump on The Late Show with Stephen Colbert.

== Early life ==
Benanti was born in New York City to Linda Wonneberger, a vocal coach and former actress, and Martin Vidnovic, a Broadway actor and singer. She is of Serbian, German, and Irish heritage. Her parents divorced when she was young. She soon moved to Kinnelon, New Jersey, with her mother and stepfather Salvatore Benanti, a psychotherapist, whose name she took and refers to as her father.

Benanti remembers being "very serious" and "a bit of an ugly duckling" as a child; she was intensely interested in musical theatre, saying she "came out of the womb as a 40-year-old". She was particularly interested in the music of Stephen Sondheim at an early age and distanced herself from other children. In 2008, Benanti told The New York Times that she drew on this loneliness in her portrayal of the neglected Louise in Gypsy. Though her parents refused to let Laura audition for professional theatre, Laura appeared in several high school and community productions, including Evita (as Perón's mistress), Follies (as Young Heidi), and Into the Woods (as Cinderella). At 16, Benanti played the title role in her high school production of Hello, Dolly! and won a Paper Mill Playhouse Rising Star Award for Outstanding Actress in a high school production. She graduated from Kinnelon High School in 1997.

== Career ==
=== 1998–2006: Broadway debut and early roles ===
In 1998, Paper Mill's then-artistic director Robert Johanson recommended Benanti for the role of Liesl in a Broadway revival of The Sound of Music. She auditioned for the show's producers and was considered too mature-looking to play Liesl, but, after several call-backs, was signed at the age of 18 to play one of the nuns and to understudy Rebecca Luker as Maria. Benanti played the role for two weeks while Luker was on vacation, and, at 19, took over the role when Luker left the production. Michael Buckley of Playbill later wrote that Benanti "was an absolutely wonderful Maria ... As do others, I believe that had she opened in the show, Benanti would have been an overnight sensation." When she was cast in The Sound of Music, Benanti had attended New York University for two weeks; the dean recommended she go on leave to take the job.

In 1999, Benanti appeared in the Broadway revue Swing!, for which she received a Tony nomination for Best Performance by a Featured Actress in a Musical. In 2000, she co-starred with Donna Murphy in the critically acclaimed New York City Center Encores! concert production of the Leonard Bernstein-Betty Comden-Adolph Green musical Wonderful Town. Benanti can be heard on the original cast albums of each of her Broadway roles, as well as compilation albums of Stephen Schwartz and Maury Yeston. She participated in a studio cast recording of Rodgers and Hammerstein's Allegro, which was released by Sony Classics in February 2009. She also appears as a guest artist on the Gay Men's Chorus of Washington, D.C.'s live album, You've Got to Be Carefully Taught: The Songs of Hammerstein & Sondheim, taken from a 2002 performance at the Kennedy Center. A songwriter and guitarist, Benanti has written songs privately since at least the early 2000s; in 2005, she said that she was working on a folk-rock solo CD, though "Musical theatre is my first love[...]I want to take my music and orchestrate it in a kind of old fashioned style, and take some standards and 'popularize' them—do a true crossover. I'm working on it."

In 2002, Benanti played Cinderella (a role she had played as a teenager) in the Broadway revival of Into the Woods and received both a Tony nomination for Best Performance by a Featured Actress in a Musical and a Drama Desk nomination for Outstanding Featured Actress in a Musical. During a mid-performance pratfall in Into the Woods, Benanti fractured her neck, herniating two discs directly onto her spinal cord and cutting off spinal fluid, a condition that sometimes leads to paralysis. The injury was misdiagnosed, and Into the Woods producers asked Benanti not to mention her injury; when she began missing performances due to neck problems, rumors spread that Benanti was behaving unprofessionally, something that she called "really hurtful". She said, "I had a serious injury and there was absolutely no way I could have done the show. I tried to. I tried to go back and do it but I physically couldn't." Benanti was eventually replaced in the show by Erin Dilly. Eight months after her initial injury, Benanti was rediagnosed and received surgery that could have damaged her voice but was successful, though as of 2005 she still experienced neck pain and myelopathy.

Three weeks after undergoing spinal surgery, Benanti started previews in March 2003 for the Broadway revival of Nine, in which she played Claudia, a movie star who inspires Guido, a director played by Antonio Banderas. She left the show in September 2003. Benanti appeared in the World AIDS Day concerts of Pippin, Children of Eden, and The Secret Garden. From April to December 2006, she played Julia Sullivan in the Broadway musical The Wedding Singer. In addition to stage roles, Benanti was a regular on the short-lived FX sitcom Starved (2005), which received mixed reviews, but Benanti described it as "a good experience. I got a lot of camera experience, which was something I just hadn't had." In 2006, she appeared in two films: Take the Lead, in which she reunited with her Nine co-star Antonio Banderas, and Falling for Grace as Princess Alexandra. In 2008, Benanti had a recurring role on the ABC television series Eli Stone. She appeared in the pilot for the TV show as well.

=== 2007–2015: Gypsy and acclaim ===
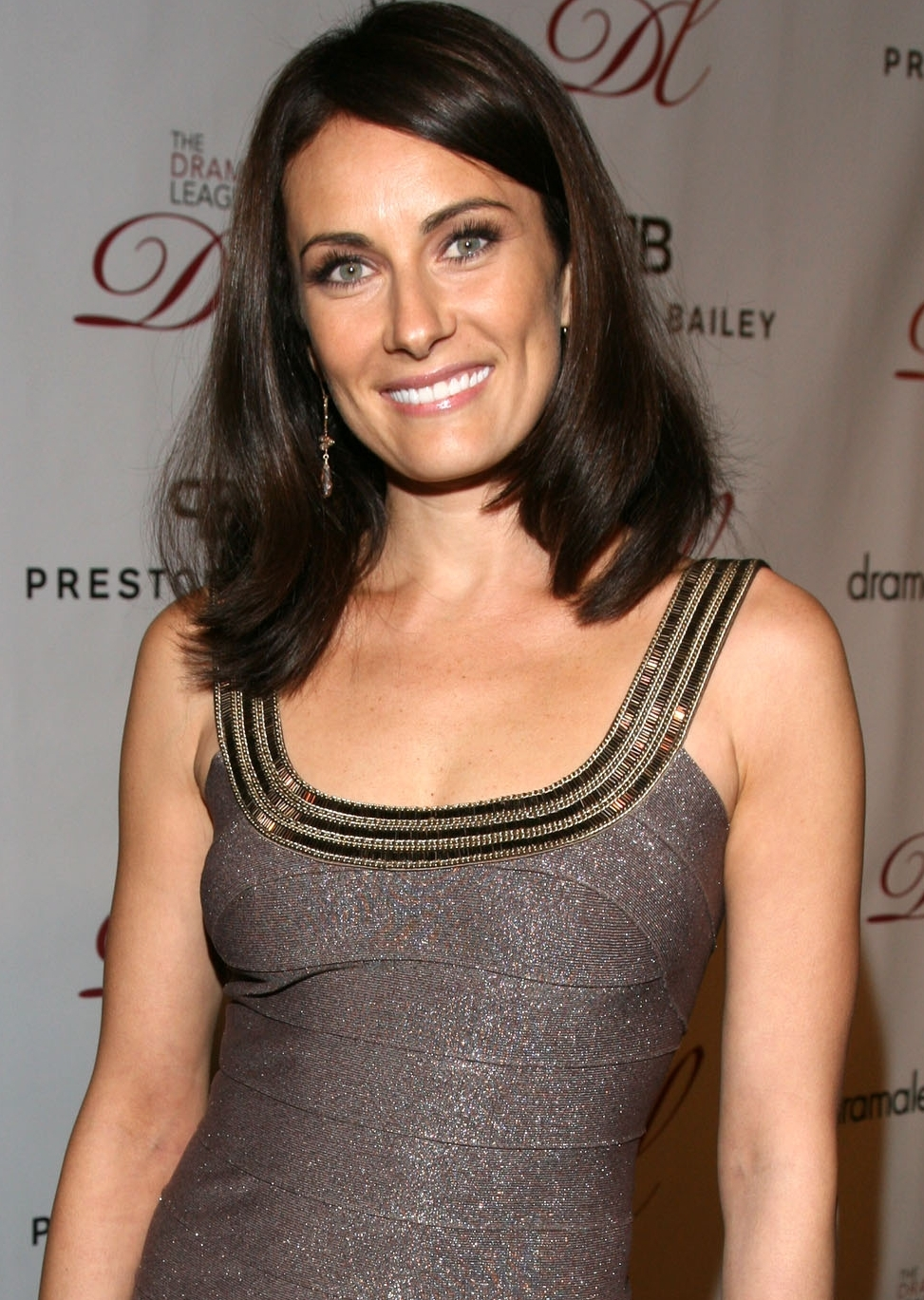
Benanti in 2012 Drama League Benefit Gala

In July 2007, Benanti played in a three-week limited run of the musical Gypsy in the Encores! staged concert production at the New York City Center as Louise, alongside Patti LuPone as Rose and Boyd Gaines as Herbie. In March 2008, the production transferred to Broadway, where it ran until January 2009 and received widespread critical acclaim. Benanti's performance as Louise was praised, with The New York Times's Ben Brantley declaring it "the performance of her career". She won several awards, including a Tony Award for Best Featured Actress in a Musical, a Drama Desk Award for Outstanding Featured Actress in a Musical, and an Outer Critics Circle Award for Outstanding Featured Actress in a Musical.

Benanti appeared in The Public Theater's world-premiere production of Christopher Durang's play Why Torture Is Wrong, And the People Who Love Them from April 6 to 26, 2009. She next appeared in the Lincoln Center Theater's production of Sarah Ruhl's In the Next Room (or The Vibrator Play) beginning previews on October 22, 2009, and opening on November 19, 2009, at the Lyceum Theatre. Benanti appeared in the new musical Women on the Verge of a Nervous Breakdown on Broadway from October 8, 2010, until January 2, 2011. She received a Tony nomination and won the Drama Desk and Outer Critics Circle Awards for Best Featured Actress in a Musical for her performance. In 2011, she was cast in the NBC series The Playboy Club, which was canceled after three episodes. Benanti played the wife of Dr. Atticus Sherman on Episode 11 of Season Two of The Big C, entitled "Fight Or Flight". In 2011 and 2012, Benanti had a recurring role on Law & Order: Special Victims Unit as Detective Nick Amaro's wife. Benanti played the role of Lauren Bennett, a leader of a support group, on the NBC series, Go On. Go On was canceled in May 2013 after one season.

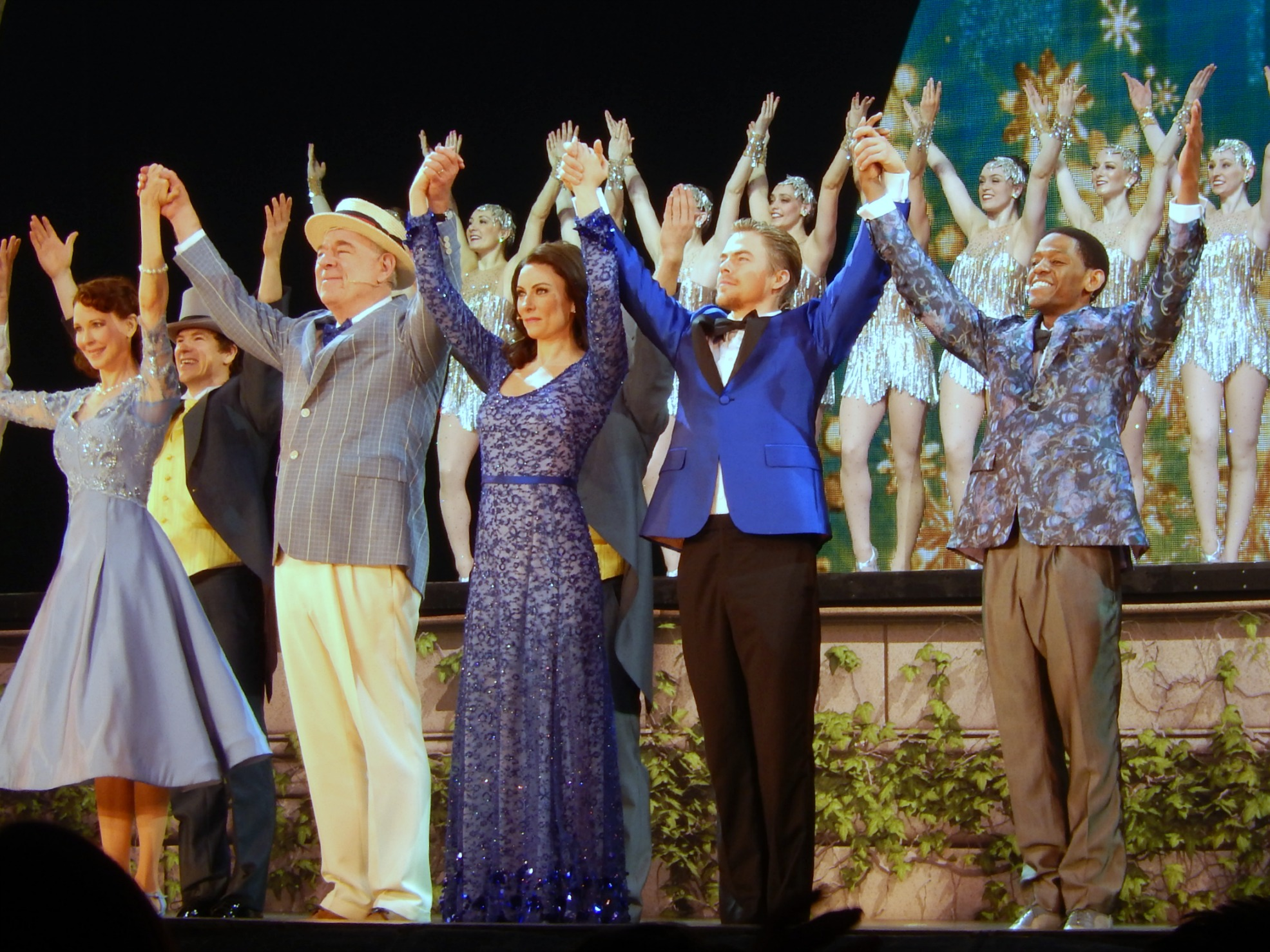
Benanti with Derek Hough and Jared Grimes at the Radio City Music Hall Spring Spectacular in 2015

In June 2013, Benanti performed as the soprano soloist in the San Francisco premiere of Andrew Lippa's oratorio, I Am Harvey Milk. She played Goddess in The Public Theater's musical adaptation of The Tempest, which was presented at the Delacorte Theatre from September 6 through 8, 2013. She had a recurring role on the USA series Royal Pains. On October 17, 2013, Benanti appeared in an episode of Elementary on CBS. She also appeared in Nurse Jackie and The Good Wife. On December 5, 2013, Benanti played Elsa Schräder in the NBC production of The Sound of Music Live! In Constant Search of the Right Kind of Attention, a live recording of Benanti's concert engagement at 54 Below, was released by Broadway Records in September 2013. In 2014, she was cast as country singer Sadie Stone in the ABC musical drama series Nashville for its third season, recording and performing several songs during her arc. From April 2 through 6, 2014, Benanti starred as Rosabella in the New York City Center Encores! staged concert production of Frank Loesser's The Most Happy Fella alongside Shuler Hensley, Cheyenne Jackson, Jay Armstrong Johnson, and Heidi Blickenstaff.

In 2015, she joined the cast of Supergirl, where she has a recurring role as Alura In-Ze, Zor-El's wife and mother of Kara and Alura's twin sister General Astra, who wants to take over Earth as its new ruler and destroy her niece Kara. In July 2017, it was announced that Benanti would not return to the series for its third season due to her work schedule and that Erica Durance would assume the role of Alura. Benanti guest-starred as Edie, a United States Postal Service inspector, in the second season of The Detour and was later promoted to a series regular for season three. On February 16, 2015, Benanti played Lucille Frank in the Manhattan Concert Productions presentation of Parade at Avery Fisher Hall, alongside Jeremy Jordan as Leo Frank. She appeared in New York Spring Spectacular at Radio City Music Hall from March 12 through May 7, 2015.

=== 2016–present ===
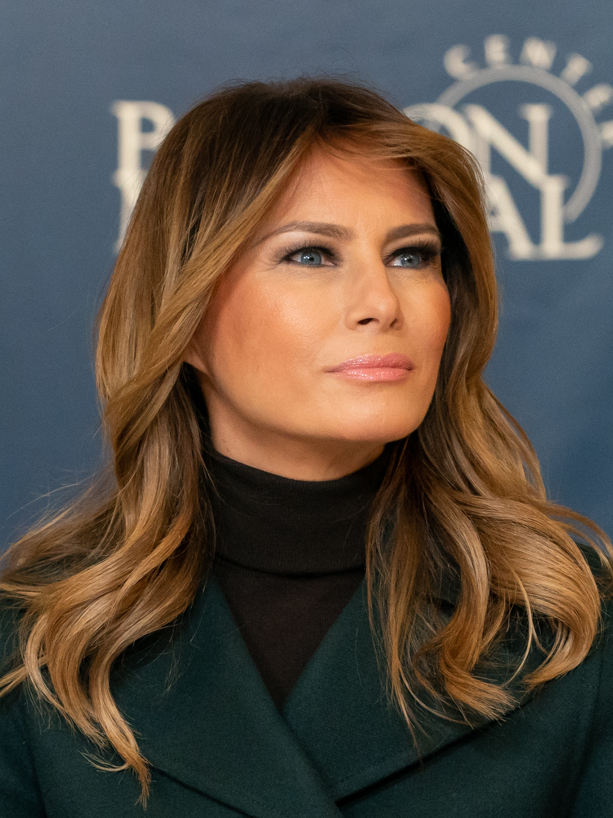
Benanti has portrayed Melania Trump (pictured) in skits on The Late Show with Stephen Colbert.

Benanti starred in the lead role of Amalia Balash in the 2016 Roundabout Theatre Company Broadway revival of She Loves Me opposite Zachary Levi. The production began previews at Studio 54 on February 19, 2016, and opened on March 17 for a limited engagement through July 10. She received a nomination for Tony Award for Best Actress in a Musical for this role. On July 19, 2016, Benanti first impersonated Melania Trump on The Late Show with Stephen Colbert during the run-up to that year's U.S. presidential election, a role she reprised in subsequent appearances on that show. In 2017, Benanti once again acted on Broadway in Steve Martin's comedic play Meteor Shower, along with Keegan-Michael Key as Gerald, Amy Schumer as Corky, and Jeremy Shamos as Norm. The play premiered on Broadway on November 1, 2017, in previews, officially on November 29, 2017, at the Booth Theatre. The play closed on January 21, 2018.

In March 2017, Tangled: Before Ever After, she voiced the character Lady Caine, serving as the film's main antagonist, leading a pirate gang. She reprised the role in Rapunzel's Tangled Adventure, from 2017 to 2019, where Lady Caine was a recurring character. Caine's character was praised for her appearance, with the character also described as "fierce", "devious", and a "total badass."

Benanti replaced Lauren Ambrose as Eliza Doolittle in the Broadway Lincoln Center Theater revival of My Fair Lady, beginning October 23, 2018, for a limited run through February 17, 2019, except for Tuesday nights with Kerstin Anderson in the role. Benanti extended her appearance in the musical to July 7, 2019. In 2019, she joined the cast of Younger, playing the role of businesswoman and author Quinn Tyler. Benanti released her self-titled first solo album in 2020. In 2021, Benanti played the role of Francine in the film Here Today, co-written and directed by Billy Crystal, starring Crystal and Tiffany Haddish. In 2023, she played the role of Allison Becker in No Hard Feelings, which starred Jennifer Lawrence. In 2025, she also starred in season 4 of Mayor of Kingstown, as a prison guard and love interest of the main character.

== Personal life ==
Benanti met Chris Barron, lead singer of the Spin Doctors, in the early 2000s. They married on July 25, 2005, but by the end of that year were in the process of a divorce, which was finalized in 2006. At the 2005 World AIDS Day "dream cast" concert of The Secret Garden, she met actor Steven Pasquale. They married in September 2007 and mutually filed for divorce in July 2013.

On June 12, 2015, she became engaged to Patrick Brown. They married on November 15, 2015. In 2017, they had a daughter, Ella. A second daughter, Louisa, was born via surrogate in 2022. On April 7, 2023, Benanti announced that she had suffered a miscarriage while on stage on a Broadway themed cruise. Knowing she was having the miscarriage, she continued to perform saying that "if it had been our first loss, or even our second, I likely wouldn't have been able to go on […] but unfortunately I am not a stranger to the pain and emptiness of losing a pregnancy".

In September 2026, Benanti appeared on Ashlyn Harris' podcast Wide Open and shared that she is sexually attracted to Brandi Carlile. She said that growing up in New Jersey in the 80s and 90s, she didn't realise attraction to women was an option.

== Acting credits ==
=== Film ===
Year	Title	Role	Notes
2006	Take the Lead	Tina	
2006	Falling for Grace	Alexandra	
2010	Meskada	Allison Connor	
2016	She Loves Me	Amalia Balash	Recorded live on Broadway, airing in cinemas
2020	Worth	Karen Abate	
2021	Here Today	Francine Burnz	
2021	Tick, Tick... Boom!	Judy Wright	
2023	No Hard Feelings	Allison Becker	
2023	The Shade	Renee Beckman	
2024	Goodrich	Naomi Goodrich	
2025	Kinda Pregnant	Daisy's Mom	
2025	Everything's Going to Be Great	Tallulah Bankhead	

=== Television ===
Year	Title	Role	Notes
2005	Starved	Billie Frasier	7 episodes
2008	Eli Stone	Beth Keller	5 episodes
2009	Life on Mars	Denise Carling	Episode: "Home Is Where You Hang Your Holster"
2010	Open Books	June	Television film
2011	The Big C	Gia Sherman	Episode: "Fight or Flight"
2011	The Playboy Club	Carol-Lynne Cunningham	6 episodes
2011–2014	Law & Order: Special Victims Unit	Maria Grazie	9 episodes
2012–2013	Go On	Lauren Bennett	22 episodes
2013	It Could Be Worse	Kendra	Episode: "What's Your Secret?"
2013	Royal Pains	Shelby Shackleford	8 episodes
2013	Elementary	Anne Barker / Abigail Spencer	Episode: "Poison Pen"
2013	The Sound of Music Live!	Elsa Schrader	Television special
2014	Nurse Jackie	Mia Peyton	7 episodes
2014–2015	The Good Wife	Renata Ellard	2 episodes
2014–2015	Nashville	Sadie Stone	15 episodes
2015–2016	Supergirl	Alura Zor-El / Astra In-Ze	10 episodes
2016–2026	The Late Show with Stephen Colbert	Melania Trump	Recurring
2017	Tangled: Before Ever After	Lady Caine (voice)	Television film
2017–2019	The Detour	Edie Randall	21 episodes
2017–2019	Tangled: The Series	Lady Caine (voice)	2 episodes
2018	Beat Bobby Flay	Herself	Guest host; Episode: "Stealing the Spotlight"
2018–2021	Younger	Quinn Tyler	18 episodes
2020	At Home with Amy Sedaris	Pipper	Episode: "Babies"
2020	Homeschool Musical: Class of 2020	Herself	Documentary special; also executive producer
2021	Ziwe	Jane / Fake Ziwe	2 episodes
2021–2023	Gossip Girl	Kiki Hope	11 episodes
2022	Inside Amy Schumer	Laura	2 episodes
2022	Would I Lie to You?	Herself	Episode: "Show Goat"
2022–2024	Life & Beth	Jane	12 episodes
2023	The Gilded Age	Susan Blane	3 episodes
2024–2026	Elsbeth	Nadine Clay	4 episodes
2025	Mayor of Kingstown	Cindy Stephens	Recurring

=== Theater ===
Year	Title	Role	Notes
1998	The Sound of Music	A Postulant	Broadway
1998–1999	The Sound of Music	Maria Von Trapp	Broadway replacement
1999	Swing!	Performer	Broadway
2000	Wonderful Town	Eileen Sherwood	Encores!
2002	Into the Woods	Cinderella / Cinderella's Mother	Ahmanson Theatre
2002	Into the Woods	Cinderella / Cinderella's Mother	Broadway
2003	Nine	Claudia Nardi	Broadway
2003	The Violet Hour	Rosamund Plinth	Broadway (Withdrawn during rehearsals)
2004	A Little Night Music	Anne Egerman	Los Angeles Opera
2004	Pippin	Catherine	World AIDS Day Benefit
2005	The Secret Garden	Lily Craven	World AIDS Day Benefit
2006	The Wedding Singer	Julia Sullivan	Broadway
2007	Gypsy	Louise Hovick	Encores!
2008–2009	Gypsy	Louise Hovick	Broadway
2009	Why Torture Is Wrong, And The People Who Love Them	Felicity	Off-Broadway
2009–2010	In the Next Room (or The Vibrator Play)	Catherine Givings	Broadway
2010–2011	Women on the Verge of a Nervous Breakdown	Candela	Broadway
2013	I Am Harvey Milk	The Soprano	San Francisco
2013	The Tempest	Goddess	Off-Broadway
2014	The Most Happy Fella	Rosabella	Encores!
2015	Parade	Lucille Frank	Avery Fisher Hall
2015	New York Spring Spectacular	Jenna	Radio City Music Hall
2016	She Loves Me	Amalia Balash	Broadway
2017–2018	Meteor Shower	Laura	Broadway
2018–2019	My Fair Lady	Eliza Doolittle	Broadway replacement
2021	Freestyle Love Supreme	Guest Performer (one night only)	Broadway
2023	Love Letters	Melissa Gardner	Irish Repertory Theatre
2023	Gutenberg! The Musical!	Guest Producer (one night only)	Broadway

== Awards and nominations ==
Year	Award	Category	Nominated work	Result
2000	Tony Award	Best Featured Actress in a Musical	Swing!	Nominated
2002	Tony Award	Best Featured Actress in a Musical	Into the Woods	Nominated
2002	Drama Desk Award	Outstanding Actress in a Musical	Into the Woods	Nominated
2002	Outer Critics Circle Award	Outstanding Featured Actress in a Musical	Into the Woods	Nominated
2003	Drama League Award	Distinguished Performance	Nine	Nominated
2003	Outer Critics Circle Award	Outstanding Featured Actress in a Musical	Nine	Nominated
2008	Tony Award	Best Featured Actress in a Musical	Gypsy	Won
2008	Drama Desk Award	Outstanding Featured Actress in a Musical	Gypsy	Won
2008	Drama League Award	Distinguished Performance	Gypsy	Nominated
2008	Outer Critics Circle Award	Outstanding Featured Actress in a Musical	Gypsy	Won
2010	Drama League Award	Distinguished Performance	In the Next Room (or The Vibrator Play)	Nominated
2010	Outer Critics Circle Award	Outstanding Actress in a Play	In the Next Room (or The Vibrator Play)	Nominated
2011	Tony Award	Best Featured Actress in a Musical	Women on the Verge of a Nervous Breakdown	Nominated
2011	Drama Desk Award	Outstanding Featured Actress in a Musical	Women on the Verge of a Nervous Breakdown	Won
2011	Drama League Award	Distinguished Performance	Women on the Verge of a Nervous Breakdown	Nominated
2011	Outer Critics Circle Award	Outstanding Featured Actress in a Musical	Women on the Verge of a Nervous Breakdown	Won
2016	Tony Award	Best Actress in a Musical	She Loves Me	Nominated
2016	Drama Desk Award	Outstanding Actress in a Musical	She Loves Me	Nominated
2016	Drama League Award	Distinguished Performance	She Loves Me	Nominated
2016	Outer Critics Circle Award	Outstanding Actress in a Musical	She Loves Me	Nominated
2016	Saturn Awards	Best Guest Starring Role on Television	Supergirl	Nominated
2018	Drama League Award	Distinguished Performance	Meteor Shower	Nominated

== Discography ==
Year	Title	Record label
2013	In Constant Search of the Right Kind of Attention	Broadway Records
2020	Laura Benanti	Masterworks Broadway

Singles

- "I Like Musicals" (2016)

Broadway recordings

- The Sound of Music (1998 Broadway Revival Cast Recording)
- Swing! (1998 Original Broadway Cast Recording)
- Into the Woods (2002 Broadway Revival Cast Recording)
- Nine (2003 Broadway Revival Cast Recording)
- The Wedding Singer (2006 Original Broadway Cast Recording)
- Gypsy (2008 Broadway Revival Cast Recording)
- Women on the Verge of a Nervous Breakdown (2011 Original Broadway Cast Recording)
- She Loves Me (2016 Revival Cast Recording)
- Songs From My Fair Lady (2019 Revival EP Recording)

Studio and concert recordings

- The Stephen Schwartz Album – 1999 Studio Recording
- The Maury Yeston Songbook – 2003 Studio Recording
- NEO (New, Emerging... Outstanding!) – 2003 Concert Recording
- You've Got To Be Carefully Taught: The Songs of Sondheim & Hammerstein – 2003 Gay Men's Chorus Of Washington D.C. Recording
- Hair – 2004 Concert Recording
- Wall to Wall Stephen Sondheim – 2006 Concert Recording
- Allegro – 2008 Studio Recording
- A Little Princess – 2010 Studio Recording
- Songs from Amberland: Edie's Reckoning – 2022 Single Recording

Soundtracks

- The Sound of Music Live: Music from the NBC Television Event – 2013 Soundtrack
- The Music of Nashville: Season 3, Volume 1 — 2014 Soundtrack (contributed 3 tracks: "Can't Help My Heart" with Will Chase, "Sad Song" and "Novocaine" with Jonathan Jackson)
- The Music of Nashville: Season 3, Volume 2 – 2015 Soundtrack (contributed 1 track: "Gasoline and Matches" with Connie Britton)
