= The Regulars =

2022 folk musical

- Initial key art by Rebecca Pitt
- Music: Will Shishmanian
- Lyrics: Will Shishmanian
- Book: Will Shishmanian; Miss Hazel Jade (developed by)
- Productions: 2022 Manchester Concert

The Regulars is a folk musical with music, lyrics, and book by Will Shishmanian. It follows the story of Mark Howard, a trans man who has just moved away from his childhood home to a rural, upstate town, where he befriends Dani Thompson, a Black queer woman who's opening her own gay bar. The production is developed and directed by Miss Hazel Jade.

== Development ==
While Shishmanian began developing the original version of the musical sometime in 2017–2018, it wasn't until October 2020 during the height of the second wave of the COVID-19 pandemic when he asked his friend and once-collaborator, Miss Hazel Jade, to take a look at the material that the two began to rework it as a commercial musical. She immediately joined, and some of the material from the new version of the musical, developed and directed by Miss Hazel, was presented live in concert at Hope Mill Theatre in Manchester, England, during their annual Turn On Fest.

Ahead of the Manchester concert, and along with a digital single, a music video was released through WhatsOnStage and Playbill, featuring Broadway & film/TV Actor, Laura Benanti, and the musical's composer, Will Shish.

== Musical numbers ==
Full Show

Act I

- "Amberland Prelude" – The Band
- "Starting Line" – Mark, Dani & Townspeople
- "Who Am I?" – Mark & Ensemble
- "Job Interview" – Mark & Tom
- "Spinning the Plates" – Derrick & Stockroom Guys
- "Do My Own Job" – Dani & Betsy
- "Is She Picking Something Up?" – Mark
- "Picture This" – Dani
- "Trying" – Mark, Dani & Families
- "Golden Glow" – Townspeople & The Band
- "Lay Low" – Brandon & Mark
- "Spinning the Plates (Reprise)" – Tom
- "A Song Bird" – Characters – Brandon
- "Autumn Haze" – Townspeople & The Band
- "Harvest Festival Sequence" – Mayor Dixon & Company

Act II

- "Entr'acte" – The Band
- "In The Outlands" – Jax, Dani & Bar Patrons
- "Do My Own Job (Reprise)" – Betsy
- "Right On Track" – Brandon & Bar Patrons
- "Here Together" – Jax, Dani & Ensemble
- "You Got Me" – Betsy, Dani & Ensemble
- "All I Wanted" – Mark
- "Learn to Trust" – Mark & Dani
- "Edie's Reckoning" – Edie & Mark
- "Golden Glow (Reprise)" – Amberland Trio & The Band
- "Finally Ready" – Dani
- "Finally Ready (Ann's Reprise)" – Dani & Ann
- "The Place That I Call Home" – Callie, Mark, Dani & Friends

2022 Manchester Concert

- "Amberland Prelude" – The Band
- "Who Am I?" – Mark & Company
- "Spinning the Plates" – Derrick & Stockroom Guys
- "Do My Own Job" – Dani & Betsy
- "Is She Picking Something Up?" – Mark
- "Picture This" – Dani
- "Trying" † – Mark & Dani
- "All I Wanted" † – Mark
- "Right On Track" – Brandon & Ensemble
- "The Intruders" – The Band
- "Here Together" † – Jax & Dani
- "You Got Me" – Betsy, Dani & Ensemble
- "Golden Glow 1" – Ensemble Trio
- "Finally Ready" – Dani
- "Golden Glow 2" – Full Company

† Removed from the final concert

=== Recordings ===
On 14 January 2022, a single was released digitally, featuring Laura Benanti and Will Shish, of a song from the show: "Songs from Amberland: Edie's Reckoning".

== Cast and characters ==
	Private Reading (2021)	Manchester Concert (2022)
Mark Howard	Jeff A. Miller	Will Shish
Dani	Kathryn Allison	Aiesha Pease
Betsy	Emily Hudson	Natalie Paris
Brandon Isaac	Darron Hayes	Marcus Collins
Jax	Kat Griffin	Teddy Hinde
Alex	Annika Chavez	—
Callie	Michelle Cosentino	—
Derrick	TJ Nelson	Matthew Facchino
Hunter	Rew Garner	Mark Lockhart
Tom	Chris Citera	—
Ensemble	—	Amy Fleur; James Markham; Jordan Walker
