= Nerves Junior =

American indie rock band

- Origin: Louisville, Kentucky, US
- Genres: Indie rock, rock
- Years active: 2009–2015
- Members: Brennon Staples; Christopher Snow; Zackary O'Renick; DeBreyon McCoy
- Past members: Cory Wayne; Stuart Phelps; Jason Buckanaga; Isaiah Tichenor; Hunter B. Rose

Nerves Junior were an American indie rock band based in Louisville, Kentucky. Over its six-year life, the band released a full-length album, As Bright As Your Night Light in September 2011 to favorable reviews. An EP Craters EP was released in 2013, before the band came to an end in May 2015.

== History ==
The group Nerves Junior formed in 2009 sharing a love for fringe garage rock and pop. Their music has been described as expansive, eclectic, experimental psychedelic rock. The band has garnered comparisons to Radiohead with "effects-heavy lead guitar and the adventurous electronic beats".

Their sonaBLAST! Records 2011 release As Bright As Your Night Light was Pretty Much Amazing's Best Reviewed Album of the Year for 2011.

== Discography ==
=== Studio albums ===
- As Bright As Your Night Light, 2011

=== EPs ===
- Craters EP,2013
