= Haymarket (Louisville) =

Defunct market in Louisville, Kentucky

The Haymarket in 1920

The Haymarket referred to an outdoor farmers' market in Louisville, Kentucky. The market occupied the block between Jefferson, Liberty, Floyd and Brook streets. A small section extended south down Floyd Street. It was established in 1891 on the site of the city's earliest rail station, belonging to the Louisville and Frankfort Railroad. The site had been cleared after the station relocated to First Street in 1881.

== 1891–1962 ==
Local truck farmers used the spot informally in the 1880s to sell goods directly to consumers. A municipal market house on Market Street closed in 1888, the last of such houses on the street. In 1891 some of the farmers formed a stock company to purchase the former rail station space permanently. Despite the name, the Haymarket did not actually sell hay in any meaningful quantities.

By the end of the 1890s, city regulations allowed hucksters of fruits, vegetables and other products to use three feet of sidewalk to sell their goods. Many of the purchasers were grocers who would arrive at daybreak to buy goods for resale in their neighborhood stores. Consumers who ventured to Haymarket directly were called "curb buyers". While buying directly at the Haymarket required much more haggling than in a grocery, better deals could be had. Many of the early vendors were Italian and Lebanese immigrants.

In the 1920s open sheds were built as cover from the weather for sellers and buyers. The Haymarket started to decline in the 1940s with the rise of chain groceries. Many vendors left for a suburban, rail-connected market in 1962. A few vendors attempted to hang on at the original site, but a ramp to Interstate 65 was built through the site and Haymarket closed after 71 years on September 1, 1962.

== 1989–mid 2000s ==
An enclosed Haymarket was in place later at a different location from 1989 to the mid-2000s, which dissolved after "it was replaced by the Nucleus Building".

== See also ==
- East Market District, Louisville
