= Rocking Horse Studio =

American production company

Rocking Horse Studio is an audio, video and multimedia production company located in Pittsfield, New Hampshire, United States. The studio was established in 2003 by Brian Coombes of Tristan Park and his wife Michelle Coombes of Waking in the Blue, and designed by acoustician Michael Blackmer. Dave Pierog joined the company as Vice President and Head of Client Services in 2004. Since its establishment it has been house to musicians such as Another Animal, The Double Yellow, Theodore Treehouse, The Lucid, Godsmack guitarist Tony Rombola, singer/songwriter Christian Cuff, guitarist/songwriter Joe Mazzari, and singer/songwriter Will Kindler.

In 2009, Mix magazine selected Rocking Horse Studio for inclusion in its "Class of 2009" feature, which showcases the best new studios to open over the previous 12 months. (Rocking Horse had its official grand opening in April 2008.)

== Owners ==
=== Brian Coombes ===
Brian Coombes is the producer and in-house recording engineer at Rocking Horse Studio. Prior to starting Rocking Horse, he was a founding member of the progressive rock band Tristan Park. The band recorded four CDs and toured extensively in Europe and North America before going into hiatus in 1998. He is currently a member of Waking in the Blue, a modern progressive pop band. In 2010, Coombes became the sole owner and operator of Rocking Horse Studio.

Brian holds an MA in Professional Communications from Northeastern University and an MBA from Southern New Hampshire University.

=== Michelle Coombes ===
Michelle Coombes is married to Brian, whom she met in 1991, and co-founder of Rocking Horse Studio. She grew up in Nashua, New Hampshire, and is vocalist and songwriter for the band Waking in the Blue. ("Waking in the Blue" comes from a poem by Robert Lowell.)

=== David Pierog ===
David Pierog joined the company as a partner in 2004. Prior to his time with the studio, Pierog founded and operated a design drafting business, supplying 2D and 3D technical graphics to the civil, mechanical, architectural, and structural engineering fields. Pierog left Rocking Horse Studio in 2010. He is an accomplished drummer, currently performing in Tractor Trailer.

== Artists who have recorded at Rocking Horse Studio ==
The studios have been used by musicians such as Greg Hawkes from Boston rock group The Cars, American Idol star Alex Preston (singer), Pat & the Hats, Tristan Omand, Anna Madsen, Godsmack guitarist Tony Rombola, Godsmack drummer Shannon Larkin, Builder of the House, Christian Cuff, the Adam Ezra Group, Sweden's Gustav & the Seasick Sailors, guitarist/producer Duke Levine, Tractor Trailer, Steve Blunt, Will Kindler, and Chris Peters.
