= Ben Arthur (musician) =

American musician

Ben Arthur (born May 20, 1973, in Charlottesville, Virginia) is an American singer-songwriter and novelist. He has released multiple full-length recordings and novels, and shared stages with several notable acts.

Arthur is the creator and host of SongWriter, a podcast that turns stories into songs. The show has featured David Gilmour of Pink Floyd, Roxane Gay, Steve Earle Joyce Carol Oates, Amanda Shires, George Saunders, Ted Leo, Gary Shteyngart, Michael Ian Black, and Cheryl Strayed.

Arthur is also a producer and the host of the songwriting video series SongCraft Presents. He has written songs for the show with My Brightest Diamond, Turin Brakes, John Wesley Harding (singer), Ben Sollee, and others. The PBS pilot of the half-hour television episode of the show was nominated for a regional Emmy. In 2015 SongCraft Presents produced a multi-format project in collaboration with the syndicated radio program Acoustic Café that was sponsored by the Ford Motor Company. Featured artists included My Brightest Diamond, Lera Lynn, and others.

His 1997 debut, Curses and Rapture, featured performances from Boyd Tinsley and Tim Reynolds, the fiddler and guitarist respectively for Dave Matthews Band. His second album — Gypsyfingers — was covered by several notable media outlets, including Rolling Stone, Marie Claire, Fox News, Performing Songwriter, and CMJ, among others.

In 2004, he released a new album, Edible Darling on the Bardic record label, for which he received coverage in several respected magazines including Rolling Stone and CMJ.

In 2008 Arthur released a new studio album entitled Mouth Feel. The album features a duet with Rachael Yamagata entitled Sun Also Rises. For this album he was interviewed on the internationally syndicated radio program Acoustic Cafe and the song "On a Sunday" from this album was National Public Radio's "Song of the Day", and XM Satellite Radio broadcast a half-hour program featuring interviews and live performances. Arthur also licensed several songs from this album to ABC's Anne Heche vehicle Men in Trees.

Arthur's 2012 album If You Look for My Heart was a combination album and novel of the same name. The album featured performances from rapper Aesop Rock and Arthur's longtime collaborator Rachael Yamagata, and was released by Louisville-based independent label sonaBLAST! Records.

Arthur lives in New York City.

== Touring ==
Notable artists Arthur has opened for include (but not limited to):

- Tori Amos
- Shawn Colvin
- Bruce Hornsby
- Sophie B. Hawkins
- Toots & the Maytals
- Old 97's
- Dave Matthews Band

In 2005, Arthur performed on the 'Modern Trobadours' tour alongside Teitur, Abra Moore, and Vienna Teng. The event was covered by World Cafe.

== Collaborations ==
- Michael Shipley was in charge of mixing Edible Darling
- On two albums Arthur performs a duet with singer-songwriter Rachael Yamagata
- Arthur's work has been remixed by Junior Vasquez

== Discography ==
- Curses and Rapture (1997)
- Gypsyfingers (2001)
- Edible Darling (2004)
- Mouth Feel (2008)
- If You Look for My Heart (2012)
- Call and Response (2014)
- American Castles (2017)
- Perspective (2018)
- Collision (2020)
- Transmission (2021)
