= The Green Building (Louisville, Kentucky) =

- Location within Kentucky

General information
- Location: East Market District ("NuLu"), 732 E Market St, Louisville, Kentucky, United States
- Coordinates: 38.253°N 85.7385°W
- Opened: September 27, 2008

Technical details
- Floor area: 10,170 ft^{2}

Renovating team
- Renovating firm: (fer) studio
- Structural engineer: BTM Engineering

Website
- http://www.thegreenbuilding.net/

The Green Building is a building located in the East Market District (NuLu) of Louisville, Kentucky. It is Louisville's first commercial Platinum LEED certified building, and Kentucky's first Platinum LEED adaptive reuse structure. The building, designed by Los Angeles architecture firm (fer) studio, was awarded Platinum certification in 2010. Design principals, Doug Pierson and Chris Mercier, are both former senior project architects with Frank Gehry's Los Angeles office, Gehry Partners LLP.

The building is home to a contemporary music venue, bar and cafe called Galaxie.

== History ==
In 1774 the area that is now NuLu, and home of The Green Building, was part of a 1,000-acre (4.0 km^{2}) Royal land grant to Col. William Preston of Virginia for his service in the French and Indian War. Preston's son, Maj. William Preston inherited the property and moved from Virginia to Louisville in 1815. In 1827, the city of Louisville annexed the property, known at the time as 'Uptown', that now includes NuLu as well as the Phoenix Hill and Butchertown neighborhoods.

The neighborhood since 1885 has been home to a variety of establishments, including bakeries, magistrates' and constables' offices, saloons, an apothecary, grocers, tailors, a jewelry store, the Great Western Tea & Coffee Co., and others. The building's first commercial use, between 1890 and 1893, was as a dry goods store operating under the name Sternau's Dry Goods. It would remain so for more than half a century. After Sternau's closed, the building housed a mill supply between 1950 and 1955 and a Goodwill between 1956 and 1977. In the 1970s the area saw a stark increase in vacancies, including 732 E. Market which was either used for storage or simply sat idle. The area would remain downtrodden until its recent renaissance.

Rehabilitation of the 114-year-old building began in 2007, after Gill Holland and Augusta Brown Holland purchased it with the intent of rescuing it from decades of misuse. The project included resuscitating the structural masonry shell and infusing it with a modern core, including a 40-foot (12 m)-high lobby, expansive natural lighting, eco-friendly materials, and renewable energy systems.

== Key features ==
The atrium's floor is made of wood salvaged from a barn in Georgia. The majority of exposed wood is original to the structure. During the rehabilitation process, the wood was removed, corn-blasted (a more environmentally friendly than sandblasting), and retrofitted to become flooring or support beams. The exposed brick and mortar walls were also corn-blasted. Most of the new wood that was brought into the building is Sustainable Forestry Initiative-certified – collected only from sustainable forests.

The cinder blocks throughout the building's structure are 'mineshaft' cinder blocks: solid masonry blocks made of slag and fly-ash, byproducts of coal production and steel making. The entire building is insulated using recycled denim.

Over the course of a year, The Green Building is 73% self sustainable in terms of energy production. The building is powered by 81 solar panels: a photovoltaic 15-kilowatt solar power system. 12 vertical geothermal wells located under the parking lot make up a closed-loop geothermal system. Its green roof, planted with native sedum, mitigates water run off, insulates and reduces the 'heat-island' effect. The building houses a 1,100 gallon 'ice chest' with 3,000 plastic liquid-filled balls that freeze nightly during the lowest usage time on the energy grid. Throughout the day, cool air from the chest is circulated throughout the building.
