= The Old Ceremony =

- Origin: Chapel Hill, North Carolina, United States
- Genres: Pop-noir, rock
- Years active: 2004–present
- Labels: sonaBLAST! Records, Yep Roc Records, Alyosha Records
- Members: Django Haskins; Dan Hall; Mark Simonsen; Gabriele Pelli; Jeff Crawford
- Past members: Josh Starmer; Daniel Hart; James Wallace; Matt Brandau
- Website: theoldceremony.com

The Old Ceremony is a Chapel Hill, North Carolina pop-noir musical group fronted by Django Haskins. Formed in 2004, the group has released five full-length albums, Our One Mistake, on sonaBLAST! Records; The Old Ceremony, Walk On Thin Air, and Tender Age on the Durham, NC label, Alyosha Records; and Fairytales and Other Forms Of Suicide on Yep Roc Records. They have also produced a live album and an album of "remixes" of their first record, produced by bassist Matt Brandau. Their fifth album, "Fairytales and Other Forms of Suicide," was released by Yep Roc Records in August 2012. Through unique live performances, radio airplay, and positive critical reviews, the group has risen to regional prominence, touring extensively throughout the US, Canada and Europe.

== Formation of the group ==
In the summer of 2004, Django Haskins, then a member of North Carolina rock supergroup International Orange, decided to form a 'mini-orchestra' to explore music that would be difficult to play in a traditional rock band. For this effort, Haskins gathered numerous musical luminaries from the NC Triangle region and the result was dubbed 'The Old Ceremony,' after Leonard Cohen's 1975 album, New Skin for the Old Ceremony.

The fledgling group was soon granted an extended residency at Chapel Hill's West End Wine Bar, where they worked to develop their unique sound and refine their musical skills. These residency performances became popular due to the group's unusual instrumentation and on-stage presence (all band members wore suits) and the group soon gained a local following. Several months after their first residency, the group recorded and released their first full-length album, The Old Ceremony.

== Members ==
- Django Haskins - lead vocals, guitar
- Mark Simonsen - vibraphone, marimba, organ, piano, backing vocals
- Gabrielle Pelli - violin, keyboards, guitar, backing vocals
- Dan Hall - drums, backing vocals
- Shane Hartman - bass guitar

== Touring and the second album ==
Soon after releasing their first album, the group embarked upon a tour of North Carolina and the Eastern US, playing venues such as Joe's Pub and IOTA. At one of their New York performances, the group attracted the attention of filmmaker Gill Holland, who offered the group a contract on his record label, sonaBLAST! Records. The contract was accepted, and in 2006, the group released their second album, Our One Mistake, on this record label. Our One Mistake was chosen by Paste Magazine as one of the 'Top 100 Albums of 2007.'

== Walk on Thin Air, Tender Age, Ed Asner, and more touring ==
TOC continued to perform all over the US and Canada, appearing with Chuck Berry, Cake, Polyphonic Spree, Avett Brothers, Poi Dog Pondering, Dex Romweber and Squirrel Nut Zippers, among others. Their third full-length album came out in Feb 2009, garnering positive press from Pitchfork Media, Allmusic and Daytrotter. The video for "Til My Voice is Gone," from Walk on Thin Air, starred Ed Asner and Eileen Ryan. It was produced by Sharon Lawrence and Andrew Carlberg, and directed by longtime TOC videographer Sam Griffith. In Sept 2010, the full-length "Tender Age" was released to the usual critical acclaim. The band composed the soundtrack to the Ed Asner film (2011 release date), "Elephant Sighs," which was directed by Ed Simpson. Most recently, the group contributed to a compilation album, Guilt by Association Vol. 3, released by Engine Room Recordings November 15, 2011. On the album the group have a cover of Whitesnake's "Here I Go Again".

== European touring ==
In 2011, TOC undertook their first extended European tour, performing in festivals and clubs in the Netherlands, Germany, France, Switzerland, and the Czech Republic. The tour was booked by Marieke Jarvis of Berlin-based Sara Bjorklund Agency. TOC bandleader returned to Europe in May 2012 to perform solo and with members of Big Star, R.E.M., The dB's, and others in the UK and Spain.

== Discography ==
=== Albums ===
- The Old Ceremony (Alyosha Records, 2005)
- Our One Mistake (sonaBLAST! Records, 2006)
- Walk On Thin Air (Alyosha Records, 2009)
- Tender Age (Alyosha Records, 2010)
- Fairytales and Other Forms of Suicide (Yep Roc Records, Aug 2012)
- Sprinter (Yep Roc Records, 2015)
- Earthbound (2024)

=== Compilation albums ===
- Here I Go Again (Whitesnake cover from Guilt by Association Vol. 3 (2011).
