= SonaBLAST! Records =

American record label

sonaBLAST! Records
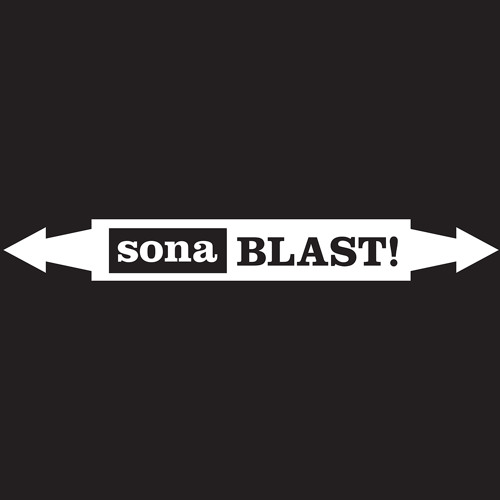
- Founded: 2002
- Founder: Gill Holland
- Genre: Various
- Country of origin: United States
- Location: Louisville, Kentucky
- Official website: www.sonablast.com

sonaBLAST! Records is a Louisville, Kentucky-based independent record label founded by film producer Gill Holland in 2002.

== Artist roster ==
- Andrew T. Hunt
- Bastion
- Beady
- Belushi Speed Ball
- Ben Arthur
- Ben Sollee
- Blair Gun
- Broken Chord
- The Broken Spurs
- Builder of The House
- Block
- Builder of the House
- Carousel Beach
- Ceiri Torjussen
- Cheyenne Marie Mize
- Chives
- Collider
- Corrina Repp
- The Debauchees
- Et Tu Brucé
- The Fervor
- GRLwood
- Heidi Howe
- Hoots And Hellmouth
- The Instruction
- Jack Harlow
- JAMIEEE
- James Lindsey
- Jamie Barnes
- Jaxon Lee Swain
- Joel Henderson
- John Grover
- Jonathan Glen Wood
- Justin Paul Lewis
- Kelley McRae
- Kyle James Hauser
- Leigh Ann Yost
- Love Jones
- Lucky Pineapple
- Mark Geary
- Max Gabriel
- Michael Whitis
- Mickey Clark
- Misha Feigin
- Nerves Junior
- The Old Ceremony
- The Pass
- Peter Searcy
- Phourist & The Photons
- Pleaser
- Quiet Hollers
- Roy Ruiz Clayton
- The Seedy Seeds
- Shannon Brackett
- Teddy Abrams ft. Jim James
- Ted Stevens
- Teneia Sanders
- Tim Krekel
- The Veldt
- WOKE
- Workers

== Soundtracks and compilations ==
- Loggerheads (2005)
- Mentor (2006)
- The War Boys (2009)
- The Catechism Cataclysm (2011)
- Belle 100: Steamboat Songs (2014)
- Maidentrip (2014)
- From Baghdad to Brooklyn (2015)
- Lazy Eye (2016)
- The Big Sick (2017)

== See also ==
- Lists of record labels
