= John Bell (Scottish actor) =

Scottish actor

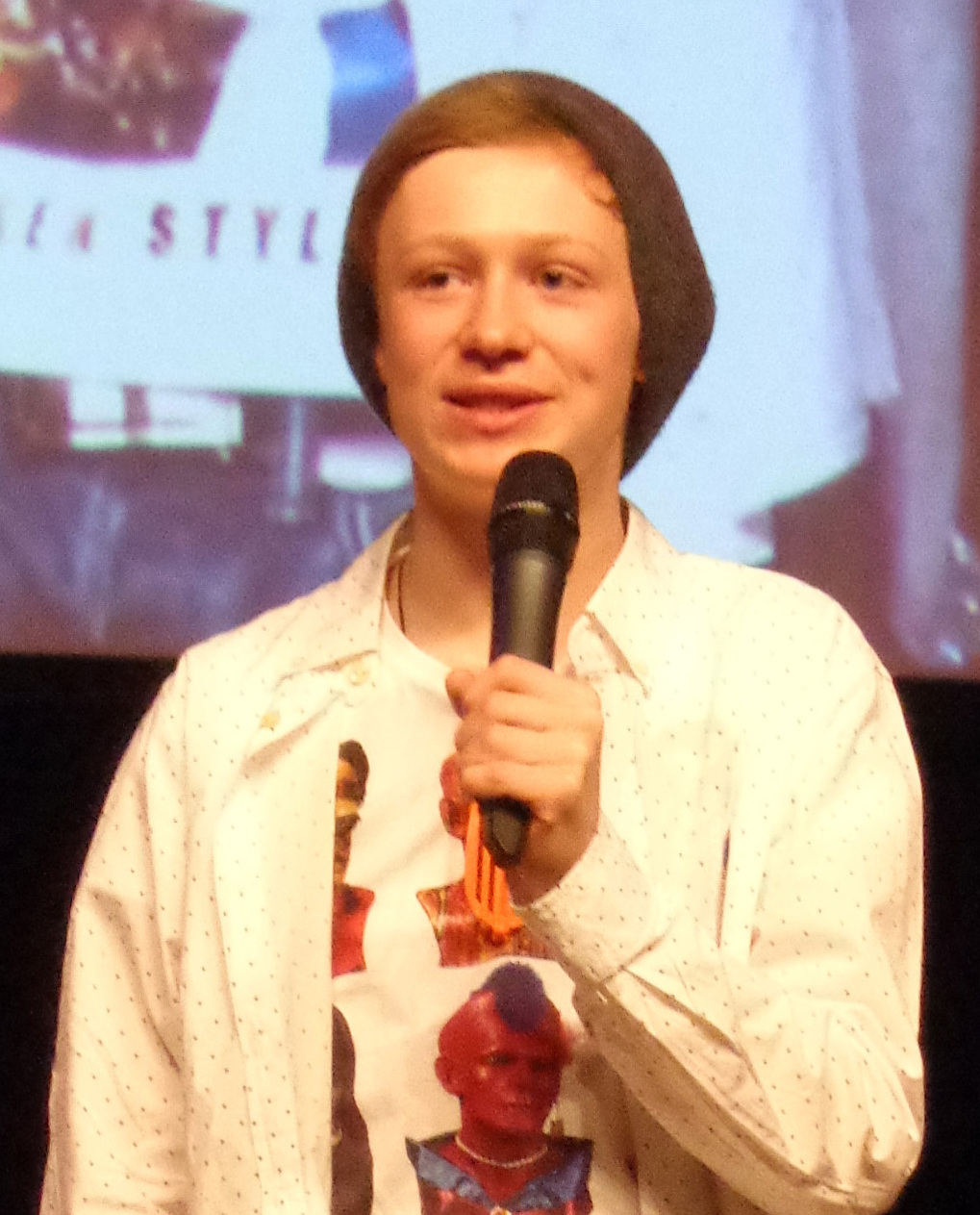
- Bell in 2015
- Born: 20 October 1997 (age 28); Paisley, Renfrewshire, Scotland
- Occupation: Actor
- Years active: 2007–present

John Hunter Bell (born 20 October 1997) is a Scottish actor. He has played Bain in two instalments of The Hobbit film series, "Young Ian" Murray in the Starz television series Outlander, Angus in Battleship, Helius in Wrath of the Titans and Toby Coleman in Tracy Beaker Returns.

== Career ==
Bell made his television debut as Creet in Doctor Who's 2007 episode "Utopia", after he won the role in a Blue Peter competition. Two years later he portrayed the lead role of Connor in award winning director Chris Roche's short film Transit. That same year Bell would star as young orphan Tomas in his first feature length film A Shine of Rainbows. From 2009 to 2010 he portrayed Anthony Weaver in BBC One's comedy series Life of Riley and from 2010 to 2011 he starred as Toby Coleman in the BAFTA winning children's television series, Tracy Beaker Returns.

In 2011 Bell appeared in BBC's made for TV movie Hattie as Robin Le Mesurier. In July 2011 he was named, by the now defunct youth casting website Screenterrier, as one of the top 12 British rising stars. The next year he portrayed Helius in the fantasy film Wrath of the Titans and Angus in the science fiction war film Battleship. He then appeared as Billy Bempsy in the History Channel's mini series Hatfields & McCoys. 2013 saw Bell portray Bain, son of Bard the Bowman, in Peter Jackson's epic adventure fantasy films The Hobbit: The Desolation of Smaug. He would revive the role in 2014's The Hobbit: The Battle of the Five Armies, the final instalment of Jackson's interpretation of J.R.R. Tolkien's novel The Hobbit. Between the two films, he would portray Jamie Carr in a 2013 episode of ITV's long running series Midsomer Murders. Bell also portrayed Niki in Evergreen Production's 2015 post WWII drama The Man in the Box, though the film has yet to be released.

Bell portrays Ian Murray in Starz's time travel series Outlander. His character first appeared in episode six of season three entitled "A. Malcolm".

In early 2022 Bell headlined the revival of Obie winner David Drake's Off-Broadway one-man show The Night Larry Kramer Kissed Me. The play, set amidst the AIDS epidemic in America, is set to run through February 2022 at London's New Wimbledon Theatre.

== Personal life ==
Bell is gay. As a child actor, he worked alongside celebrated gay male actors, which helped him feel accepted in the industry.

== Filmography ==
=== Film ===
Year	Title	Role	Notes
2009	Transit	Connor	Short film
2009	A Shine of Rainbows	Tomas	
2012	Wrath of the Titans	Helius	
2012	Battleship	Angus	
2013	The Hobbit: The Desolation of Smaug	Bain	
2014	Tracks	Ed	Short film
2014	The Hobbit: The Battle of the Five Armies	Bain	
2015	Billy the Kid	Billy	Short film
2015	The Man in the Box	Niki	In post production
2017	T2 Trainspotting	Young Spud	

=== Television ===
Year	Title	Role	Notes
2007	Doctor Who	Creet	Episode: "Utopia"
2009–2010	Life of Riley	Anthony Weaver	7 episodes
2010–2011	Tracy Beaker Returns	Toby Coleman	25 episodes
2011	Hattie	Robin Le Mesurier	Television film
2012	Hatfields & McCoys	Billy Dempsey	3 episodes
2013	Midsomer Murders	Jamie Carr	Episode: "The Sicilian Defence"
2017	Into the Badlands	Gabriel	5 episodes
2017–2026	Outlander	Ian Murray	Series regular, 49 episodes

=== Theatre ===
Year	Title	Role	Director	Theatre
2022	The Night Larry Kramer Kissed Me	Performer	Steven Dexter	New Wimbledon Theatre

=== Audio drama ===
Year	Title	Role	Notes
2015	The Extraordinary Adventures of G.A. Henty: The Dragon And The Raven	Young Harold	
