= Friday Night Dinner =

British television sitcom (2011–2020)

- Main title screen
- Genre: Sitcom; Dark comedy; Farce
- Created by: Robert Popper
- Written by: Robert Popper
- Directed by: Steve Bendelack; Martin Dennis; Robert Popper
- Starring: Tamsin Greig; Paul Ritter; Simon Bird; Tom Rosenthal; Mark Heap
- Opening theme: "Animal (Punks Jump Up Remix)" by Miike Snow
- Composers: Little Boots ("Meddle"); Casiokids ("Fot i hose"); Phoenix ("1901"); Deerhoof ("Believe E.S.P.")
- Original language: English
- No. of series: 6
- No. of episodes: 37 (list of episodes)

Production
- Executive producers: Nira Park; Caroline Leddy; Kenton Allen
- Producer: Robert Popper
- Production location: London
- Editors: Lucien Clayton; Pete Drinkwater; Paul Machliss
- Camera setup: Single-camera
- Running time: 21–25 minutes
- Production companies: Popper Pictures; Big Talk Productions

Original release
- Network: Channel 4
- Release: 25 February 2011 – 1 May 2020

Related
- Dinner with the Parents

Friday Night Dinner is a British farcical sitcom created by Robert Popper that aired on Channel 4 from 25 February 2011 to 1 May 2020. Starring Tamsin Greig, Paul Ritter, Simon Bird, Tom Rosenthal, and Mark Heap, it follows the regular Friday night dinner experience of the Jewish middle-class Goodman family in Mill Hill, a north London suburb. Following the conclusion of the sixth series and Ritter's death in 2021, it was announced that the show would not return.

Friday Night Dinner received generally favorable reviews and received two BAFTA nominations in 2012. The first series was nominated for Best Situation Comedy, while Greig was nominated for Best Female Comedy Performance. In 2021, for his performance in the final series of the show, Ritter received a posthumous BAFTA nomination for Best Male Comedy Performance.

== Premise ==
Friday Night Dinner depicts Shabbat dinner in the middle-class secular Jewish Goodman family, reflecting series creator Popper's own secular Jewish upbringing. It is set and filmed in suburban North London, with recording taking place in Mill Hill.

The family consists of mother Jackie, father Martin, elder son Adam, and younger son Jonny. The episodes follow the family as the sons arrive at the family home and proceed to their dinner, which is often interrupted by numerous things. Although some episodes are centred around Jackie's eccentricities, she is usually the straight character who tries to run a normal household but is disrupted by the rest of the family. Dinner is usually disrupted by Adam and Jonny pranking each other (for example, putting salt in each other's drinking glasses) or Martin's strange habits, such as walking around the house shirtless or eating out-of-date food. When something goes wrong, Martin is often heard shouting his catchphrase "shit on it". They are frequently interrupted by their strange but good-hearted neighbour Jim Bell, who is attracted to Jackie and visits them due to his loneliness; he is usually accompanied by his dog, Wilson, of whom he is afraid. After Wilson's death in series 5, Jim adopts a new dog, whom he names Milson in the first episode of series 6. In series 4, Jim briefly takes care of a cat named Watson owned by his brother.

Jackie's neurotic best friend Valerie Lewis, known as "Auntie Val" to Adam and Jonny, is a frequent visitor; Jackie's mother Nellie "Grandma" Buller also visits. Occasional guest appearances were made by Martin's mother Cynthia Goodman, nicknamed "Horrible Grandma" by the boys due to her cruel and condescending treatment of the family. Other guest appearances featured Nellie's suitor Mr. Morris, who appeared in three episodes while Val's husband Larry briefly appears in two episodes.

== Cast ==
=== Main ===
- Tamsin Greig as Jacqueline "Jackie" Goodman
- Paul Ritter as Martin Goodman
- Simon Bird as Adam Goodman
- Tom Rosenthal as Jonathan "Jonny" Goodman
- Mark Heap as Jim Bell

=== Recurring ===
- Frances Cuka as Nellie Buller ("Grandma"), Jackie's mother.
- Tracy-Ann Oberman as Valerie "Val" Lewis ("Auntie Val"), Jackie's best friend.
- Harry Landis as Lou Anthony Morris ("Mr Morris"), Grandma's boyfriend.
- Rosalind Knight as Cynthia Goodman ("Horrible Grandma"), Martin's mother.
- Steve Furst as Larry Lewis, Val's ex-husband.
- Paul McNeilly as Lawrence, the barman at the local pub, the Black Boy.
- Lesley Vickerage (series 2) as Liz, Jonny's girlfriend and boss.

== Episode list ==
Series	Episodes	Originally released		Average UK viewers (millions)
Series	Episodes	First released	Last released	Average UK viewers (millions)
1	6	25 February 2011	8 April 2011	—N/a
2	6	7 October 2012	11 November 2012	—N/a
Special		24 December 2012	—N/a	1.54
3	6	20 June 2014	25 July 2014	1.45
4	6	22 July 2016	26 August 2016	1.66
5	6	4 May 2018	8 June 2018	2.09
6	6	27 March 2020	1 May 2020	4.70

== Reception ==
=== Critical reception ===
On Metacritic, Friday Night Dinner holds a weighted average score of 72 out of 100, based on 5 critics, indicating "generally favorable" reviews.

Initial reaction to Friday Night Dinner was slow, with The Guardian commenting in March 2011 that it was met with "almost universal disapproval". Among the early criticisms was that its premise of a Jewish family gathering was too similar to contemporary BBC sitcom Grandma's House, that its pace was too slow, and that Simon Bird's acting was too similar to his role on The Inbetweeners. The same publication called the first episode "particularly underwhelming" and compared it negatively to Grandma's House. Reviews began to improve in the second series, as critics noted a shift to slapstick and surrealism.

The show was praised for its unique blend of familial chaos and comedic timing, though some critics pointed out its over reliance on repetitive slapstick humour. Micheal Hogan of The Telegraph commended the series for its consistent delivery of "warm, daft escapism". Throughout its time on air, Friday Night Dinner maintained a dedicated fan base and became a staple of British comedy television, with its portrayal of family dynamics resonating with many viewers.

=== Ratings ===
The first series premiered on 25 February 2011 in which it received 2.31 million views in its debut week. According to Digital Spy, the third episode of the first series received 1.06 million views. The fourth episode saw a rise in viewership, to 1.5 million viewers. In the sixth and final series, its debut episode had an audience of 4.29 million in its first week.

=== Awards ===
Friday Night Dinner received four nominations at the British Comedy Awards, three nominations from the British Academy of Film and Television Arts, one nomination from the Broadcasting Press Guild Awards, one award from the Rose d'Or Light Entertainment Festival, and one nomination and one award from the Royal Television Society.

- Nomination for Best TV Comedy Actress, (Tamsin Greig), British Comedy Awards 2011
- Nomination for Best TV Sitcom, British Comedy Awards 2011
- Nomination for Best Comedy Breakthrough Artist, (Tom Rosenthal), British Comedy Awards 2011
- Nomination for Best New Comedy Programme, (Robert Popper), British Comedy Awards 2011
- Winner for Best Tape and Film Editing: Entertainment and Situation Comedy, (Lucien Clayton), Royal Television Society 2011
- Nomination for Best Writer - Comedy, (Robert Popper), Royal Television Society 2011
- Winner for Best Sitcom, (Robert Popper), Rose d'Or 2012
- Nomination for Best Female Performance in a Comedy Programme, (Tamsin Greig), BAFTA Awards 2012
- Nomination for Best Situation Comedy, (Robert Popper, Steve Bendelack, Kenton Allen, Caroline Leddy), BAFTA Awards 2012
- Nomination for Best Comedy, Broadcasting Press Guild Awards 2021
- Nomination for Best Male Performance in a Comedy Programme, (Paul Ritter), BAFTA Awards 2021

== Legacy ==
For the 10th anniversary of the show, a special 90-minute documentary episode aired on Channel 4 on 28 May 2021, entitled Friday Night Dinner: Ten Years and A Lovely Bit of Squirrel. The documentary was dedicated to Paul Ritter, who had died of a brain tumour seven weeks earlier.

== American version ==
In September 2011, Deadline Hollywood announced that Greg Daniels, who had adapted The Office for American television, would spearhead an American remake of the series for the broadcast network NBC. The remake was picked up for a pilot, written by Daniels and directed by Ken Kwapis and starring Allison Janney and Tony Shalhoub as the parents and Gary Anthony Williams as Jim (now renamed Mark). The pilot did not go to series.

In 2014, CBS bought an adaptation of the British show for the American market, as a "put pilot".

In 2016, a third attempt at an American remake was under development by CBS, with the title Sunday Night Dinner.

In July 2022, Amazon Freevee ordered an American remake of the sitcom, with the title Dinner with The Parents. It starred Dan Bakkedahl, Michaela Watkins, Carol Kane, Daniel Thrasher, and Henry Hall. The series premiered on 18 April 2024, received poor to mixed reviews and was canceled in December 2024.
