= Tim Kirkman =

American screenwriter and director

- Education: North Carolina State University (BA) The New School (MA)
- Occupations: Screenwriter; director; professor
- Years active: 1998–present
- Employer: Transylvania University
- Website: https://www.timkirkman.com/

Tim Kirkman is an American screenwriter and director.

Kirkman's feature film debut, Dear Jesse, was released theatrically by Cowboy Pictures in 1998. A documentary film about the political and personal parallels between the gay filmmaker and the notoriously anti-gay U.S. Senator Jesse Helms, Dear Jesse, made its cable television debut on HBO/Cinemax's Reel Life series and was nominated for an Emmy Award in the News/Documentary Writing category in 2000. The TV broadcast version of the film featured an interview with Matthew Shepard, a college student whose murder called attention to gay-bashing and hate crimes.

His second film, the performance documentary The Night Larry Kramer Kissed Me, David Drake's solo off-Broadway hit play about writer Larry Kramer, was released by FilmNext in 2000. He also directed 2nd Serve, written by James Markert and starring Josh Hopkins, Cameron Monaghan, Alexie Gilmore, Sam McMurray, Guillermo Diaz, Kevin Sussman and Dash Mihok.

Kirkman's narrative feature debut, Loggerheads, which he wrote and directed, premiered at the 2005 Sundance Film Festival where it was nominated for the Grand Jury Prize for Best Dramatic Feature and won prizes at several film festivals across the United States, including the Grand Jury Prize at Outfest. The film, which stars Tess Harper, Bonnie Hunt, Michael Kelly, Michael Learned, Kip Pardue, Chris Sarandon and Robin Weigert, was released by Strand Releasing in October 2005.

One of Kirkman's most recent film, Lazy Eye, which he wrote, directed, and produced (with Todd Shotz) was released in 2017 and stars Lucas Near-Verbrugghe, Aaron Costa Ganis, and Michaela Watkins. It was first released in theaters; it was then released on Netflix after it screened at various festivals around the world.

== Early life ==
Tim Kirkman graduated from NC State University's College of Design with a degree in graphic design and a minor in Journalism. He then earned an M.A. in Media Studies at The New School in New York City.

== Career ==
For ten years, Kirkman was a graphic designer at Miramax.

Kirkman has previously taught at the University of Southern California's School for Cinematic Arts, UCLA's School of Theater, Film and Television, and Hunter College, among others.

Kirkman's production company is T42 Production Company, which he runs along with Todd Shotz. The company started in 2017, and its goal is to make LGBTQ+ voices heard. Kirkman currently hosts the podcast Reel Lives.

Billy Porter joined Kirkman's most recent work, Freeman Vines, as executive producer. Freeman Vines is distributed by Switchboard Magazine. Freeman Vines is a short film, serving as a dedication to an 82-year-old guitar designer and enthusiast from rural North Carolina. This film highlights the passion, artistry and hard work of a business owner living off of what they love despite challenges surrounding them.

Tim received the Alfred P. Sloan Award for the development of a screenplay named "Kitty Hawk" in 2010. This was a biopic about Wilbur and Orville Wright, who were American Aviation Pilots. They invented and flew the first successful airplane. He also completed "Mr. Fix It", which was an original screenplay about the events before the 1964 presidential election.

== Filmography ==
- Dear Jesse (1998) - Writer/director (documentary)
- The Night Larry Kramer Kissed Me (2000) - Director
- Loggerheads (2005) - Writer/director
- 2nd Serve (2013) - Director
- Lazy Eye (2016) - Writer/director
- Freeman Vines (2025) - Director

== Awards and nominations ==
Dear Jesse was nominated for an Emmy Award in the News/Documentary Writing category in 2000 and the Open Palm Award at the Gotham Awards. The film was named as a runner-up for best documentary in 1998 by the Boston Society of Film Critics.

Kirkman's narrative feature debut, Loggerheads, which he wrote and directed, premiered at the Sundance Film Festival where it was nominated for the Grand Jury Prize for Best Dramatic Feature and won prizes at several film festivals across the United States, including the Grand Jury Prize at Outfest.

Year	Award	Category	Nominated work	Result
1998	Frameline Film Festival	Best Documentary	Dear Jesse	Won
1999	Gotham Awards	Open Palm Award	Dear Jesse	Nominated
1999	Independent Spirit Awards	Truer than Fiction Award	Dear Jesse	Nominated
2000	Emmy Awards	Outstanding Achievement in a Craft in News and Documentary Programming	Dear Jesse	Nominated
2005	Sundance Film Festival	Grand Jury Prize	Loggerheads	Nominated
2005	Nashville Film Festival	Best Feature	Loggerheads	Won
2005	L.A. Outfest	Outstanding American Narrative Feature	Loggerheads	Won
2025	Montclair Film Festival (MFF)	Documentary Shorts Competition	Freeman Vines	Nominated
