= Dinner with the Parents =

- Genre: Sitcom
- Created by: Jon Beckerman
- Based on: Friday Night Dinner by Robert Popper
- Showrunner: Jon Beckerman
- Directed by: Sam Leifer; Tristram Shapeero
- Starring: Michaela Watkins; Dan Bakkedahl; Henry Hall; Daniel Thrasher; Carol Kane; Jon Glaser
- Country of origin: United States
- Original language: English
- No. of seasons: 1
- No. of episodes: 10

Production
- Production companies: CBS Studios; Big Talk Studios

Original release
- Network: Amazon Freevee
- Release: April 18 – May 9, 2024

Dinner with the Parents is an American television sitcom. Adapted by Jon Beckerman from the British sitcom Friday Night Dinner, the series centers on the Shabbat dinners of the Langer family. The series ran for one season of ten episodes on Amazon Freevee, from April 18 to May 9, 2024.

The series stars Michaela Watkins, Dan Bakkedahl, Henry Hall, Daniel Thrasher and Carol Kane as members of the Langer family, and Jon Glaser as their nuisance neighbor Donnie. Though inspired by Friday Night Dinner, Beckerman based the characters on his own family from Pittsburgh, including the addition of a live-in grandmother. The series was produced by CBS Studios and Big Talk Studios and filmed in England. Critical reception was largely negative, with reviewers noting differences from Friday Night Dinner in characterization and humor.

== Premise ==
The Langers, a secular Jewish family, meet for Shabbat dinner on Friday night. Elder son David (Henry Hall) is a math professor who has returned to the area after his studies. His middle-aged parents Harvey (Dan Bakkedahl) and Jane (Michaela Watkins) live with his unemployed younger brother, Gregg (Daniel Thrasher). His grandmother, a heavy vaper with an Eastern European accent, also lives at the family home. Neighbor Donnie (Jon Glaser), a Pittsburgh Steelers fan with a dog named after Jack Lambert, is attracted to Jane.

The show's setting is deliberately not mentioned, but adapter Jon Beckerman said that it is based on Squirrel Hill in Pittsburgh, where he grew up.

== Episodes ==
No.	Title	Directed by	Written by	Original release date
1	"Pizza and Wings"	Tristram Shapeero	Jon Beckerman	April 18, 2024
David's girlfriend breaks up with him on the night she was going to meet his parents.
2	"#IGoThere"	Sam Leifer	Ryan Walls	April 18, 2024
Jane competes for attention against her sister, a social media personality.
3	"Sip for Sip"	Tristram Shapeero	Jon Beckerman	April 18, 2024
David's attempts with a girl are hampered by Jane and Harvey's interactions with her parents.
4	"Operation Thingus"	Tristram Shapeero	Dana Klein	April 18, 2024
David unwittingly delivers an unfitting Valentine's Day gift and the family must retrieve it.
5	"Shiva"	Tristram Shapeero	Arthur Meyer	April 25, 2024
The Langers hold a shiva for Uncle Reuben.
6	"Koi Story"	Tristram Shapeero	Ryan Walls	April 25, 2024
David and Gregg advertise the house on Airbnb while their parents are away.
7	"Music Under the Stars"	Sam Leifer	Luke Fujimoto Jensen	May 2, 2024
David and Jenny are distracted by Harvey's garage band practice.
8	"Music Under the Stars"	Sam Leifer	Carol Kolb	May 2, 2024
Jenny's mother invites the Langers to dinner, but David lies that only he is available.
9	"Eureka"	Sam Leifer	Ritza Bloom	May 9, 2024
Gregg distracts David when he is about to solve a mathematical problem.
10	"The Langer Games"	Sam Leifer	Jon Beckerman	May 9, 2024
The Langers' resentment of one another culminates on Passover.

== Production ==
=== Background ===
Friday Night Dinner, written by Robert Popper, ran for six seasons on the UK's Channel 4 between 2011 and 2020. The series concluded after the death of actor Paul Ritter in 2021. Attempts at an American remake began in 2011 with Greg Daniels making a pilot for NBC with actors Allison Janney and Tony Shalhoub. CBS attempted to adapt the series in 2014 and 2016.

In July 2022, Dinner with the Parents was announced. The series was produced by CBS Studios and Big Talk Studios, the latter being a subsidiary of ITV Studios in the UK.

=== Development and filming ===
Beckerman enjoyed Friday Night Dinner, observing that the adult characters acted like teenagers when they returned to their parents' home, which reminded him of his own family life. He named the characters after the middle names of corresponding members of his family, with himself as elder brother David. The live-in grandmother, absent from Friday Night Dinner, was based on his own family. Some elements of characters are based on several members of his family; the father's love of Steely Dan comes from Beckerman's own middle-aged interests, not those of his father.

The series was filmed in Winnersh, in Berkshire, England. Glaser, of Detroit, struggled to do a Pittsburgh accent, and used what Beckerman called an "unholy marriage" of the two cities' accents. Of the main cast, Watkins, Kane and Glaser are Jewish, and Hall has Jewish ancestry through his mother Julia Louis-Dreyfus.

It was announced in November 2024 that Amazon Freevee would shut down, and its content would be moved to Amazon Prime Video. In December, Dinner with the Parents was canceled.

== Reception ==
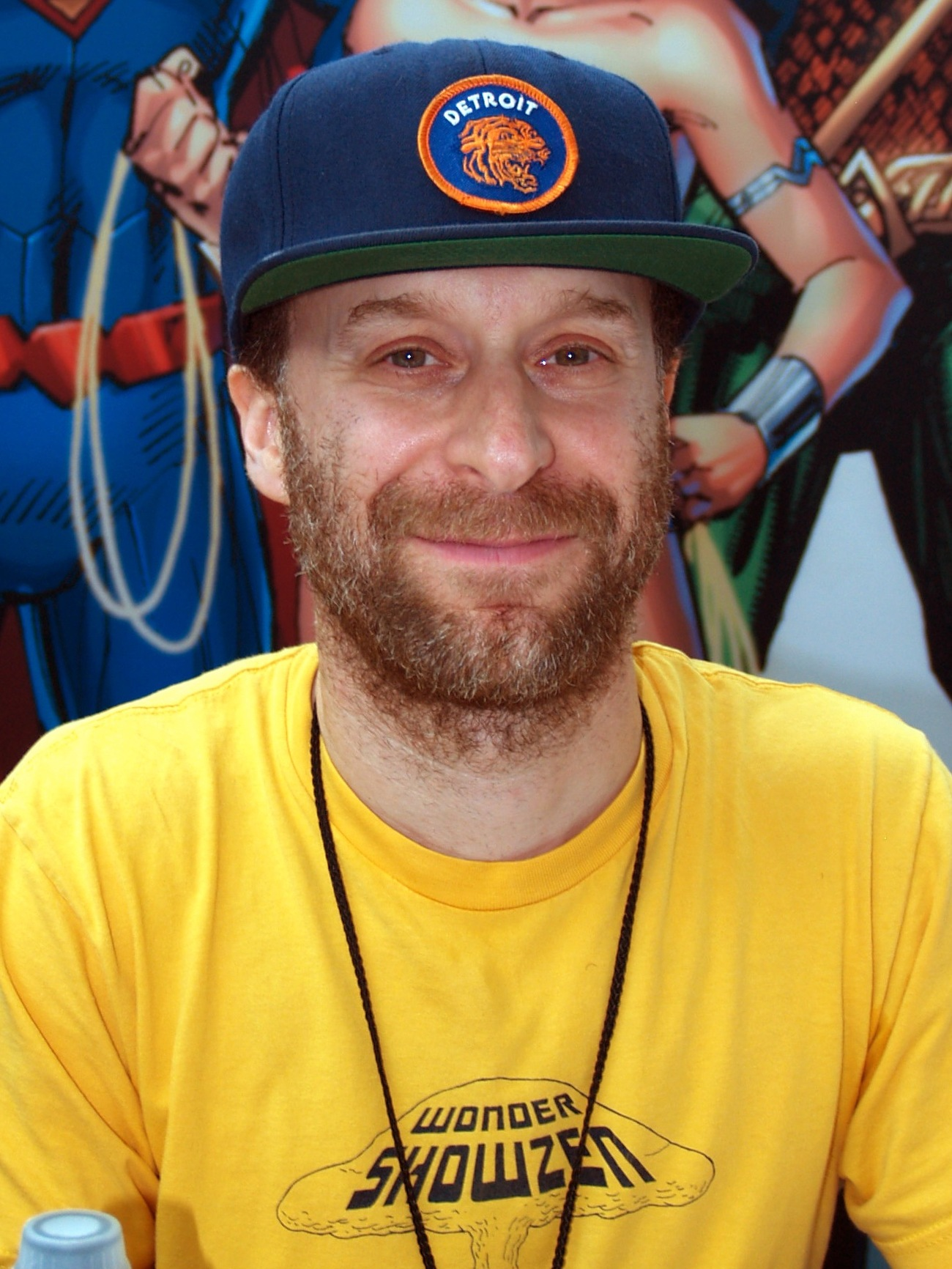
Critics compared the characters played by Dan Bakkedahl (left) and Jon Glaser (right) negatively to their equivalents on Friday Night Dinner.

The father and neighbor in Dinner with the Parents received criticism for their differences from their counterparts in Friday Night Dinner. In the British series, Martin Goodman has several unusual and obsessive habits, while the American Harvey Langer is loud and outgoing. The British neighbor Jim is meek and unsettling, while the American neighbor Donnie is a womanizer and a sports fan. Jon O'Brien of IndieWire said that he could believe why the Goodmans of Friday Night Dinner would accommodate Jim, but could not understand why the Langers did so with Donnie.

In the American Jewish press, Dan Friedman of J. The Jewish News of Northern California had high hopes due to the greater prominence of Jewish humor in the United States compared to the United Kingdom. He found that the American series had tired jokes about suburban life, while the British original had "satire and strangeness". Nate Bloom of The American Israelite in Cincinnati wrote "I was almost never amused by the show’s wacky humor".

Tara Ariano wrote in Cracked that the series was "too dirty and violent" for family viewing and recommended fellow Amazon Freevee series Primo instead. She criticized the use of British actors for supporting characters. On Decider, Joel Keller praised the cast for elevating mediocre material, but considered them to be playing typecast roles. He believed that the show's domestic setting led to inconsistent quality of episodes. Bruce R. Miller of the Arizona Daily Star praised the series, particularly the sibling rivalry.
