= Mark Geary =

Irish singer

- Born: Mark Geary; 31 January 1971 (age 55)
- Origin: Dublin, Ireland
- Genres: Folk, indie rock, folk rock
- Occupations: Musician, songwriter, singer, actor
- Instruments: Vocals, guitar, drums
- Years active: 1992–present
- Label: SonaBLAST!
- Website: Official Mark Geary Site

Mark Geary is an Irish singer-songwriter born in Dublin, Ireland. In 1992 he emigrated to New York City. His brother is Karl Geary.

== Career ==
When Geary arrived in New York he had the chance to jump right in at the famous Sin-é bar. However, he felt a little intimidated at that early stage in his career. "It was a huge amount of pressure," said Geary. "I walked in and saw Jeff Buckley, Katell Keineg, Sinéad O'Connor." So Geary began to seek out gigs at less exalted local spots. He built a reputation playing at Sidewalk Café and won a regular slot at the Pink Pony. Eventually, working his way back to Sin-é, where he found himself on a regular bill sandwiched between Keineg and Buckley. Geary also worked and regularly performed in the popular New York bar The Scratcher.

In 2002, his debut album, 33 1/3 Grand Street was released on SonaBLAST! Records.

His second album, Ghosts, released in 2004, brought him critical acclaim in Ireland and the States and was voted Album of the Year (2005) by the Irish Voice. The album also features songs with guest vocalists Glen Hansard and Josh Ritter. The album came in at number 68 in the HotPress readers' poll for the Top 100 Greatest Irish Albums.

In August 2005, Geary played at the Kennedy Center.

Geary's third studio recording, Opium, was released in 2008. Following this, Geary released a live recording Live, Love, Lost It – NYC that took him back to his New York roots and features songs recorded at various shows performed in the summer of 2009.

Geary subsequently released a fourth album, Songs about Love, Songs about Leaving, in 2012 and features vocals by Glen Hansard and Jenna Nichols.

Geary's fifth studio album, The Fool, came out in October 2017.

Geary has supported major artists all over the world throughout his career. In 2008 he supported the Oscar-winning duo, The Swell Season on their European tour. In 2010 he supported Glen Hansard on Hansard's European solo tour. Other acts he has played with include, Josh Ritter, Bell X1, The Frames, Coldplay, Elvis Costello, The Pretenders and Joe Strummer.

Plus extensive headlining tours in Europe, the US and more recently in Switzerland where he received critical acclaim.

The single "The Forest" was released in May 2020, followed by "Spectre" in December 2020. Ruth O'Mahony-Brady [ROMY] produced both The Forest and Spectre.

=== Movie & TV soundtracks ===
Geary has composed the full score to three films:

2005 Loggerheads

2006 Steel City.

2010 Sons of Perdition which featured at the 2010 Tribeca Film Festival and chosen as one of the first films included in the OWN: Oprah Winfrey Network Documentary Club.

Geary's songs have been featured in various films including the 2006 movie, The End of Silence. The film features Geary's song "Hold Tight" over the closing credits. More recently Mark's song "Don't Break" from The Fool was in the 2019 movie Before/During/After. His songs have been used on many television programmes including the One Tree Hill, which featured his songs "South" (season 2) and "Angel" (season 6).

== Discography ==
=== Studio albums ===
- 33 1/3 Grand Street (2002)
- Ghosts (2004)
- Opium (2008)
- Songs about love, songs about leaving (2012)
- The Fool (2017)

=== Live albums ===
- Live, Love, Lost It – NYC (2009)
- Songs Vienna
- Mark Geary - Live in Fagagna (2019)

=== Singles & EPs ===
- America (revisited) (2003)
- Tuesday (2008)
- Christmas Biscuits (2013) duet with Glen Hansard
- The Forest (2020)
- Spectre (2020)
- Hollow (2023)

=== Compilations ===
- Even Better Than the Real Thing, Vol. 3 (2005), "All I Want is You"
- Independent Music for Independent Coffee Drinkers Vol. 1 (2007), "Here's to You"

=== Soundtracks ===
==== Full movie scores ====
- Loggerheads (2005) including "Facing The Fall" & "All For Nothing"
- Steel City (2006) including "Volunteer"
- Sons of Perdition (2010) including "They Want Heaven"

==== Movies with featured songs ====
- The Tavern (1999) "Gingerman", "Adam and Eve", "Obi's Chair", "South"
- Vito After (2005)
- The Hermit of Manana (2006)
- Mentor (2006) "South" and "Hold Tight"
- The End of Silence (2006) "Hold Tight"
- Ben's Plan (2007)
- Toxic Soup (2009)
- Break-Up Artist (2009)
- Tanner Hall (2009) "Suzanne" & "Ghosts"
- The Dish & the Spoon (2011) "Songs my mother taught me"
- Angel (2012) "Wake Up"
- Second Serve (2012) "Cali Solo"
- Body Swap (2019) "Frostbite"
- Swallow (2019) "Cali Solo"
- Before/During/After (2020) "Don't Break"

==== Television soundtracks ====
- One Tree Hill (2 episodes, 2005–2009)
  - "Angel", Episode: Show Me How to Live (2009)
  - "South", Episode: Between Order and Randomness (2005)
- Bones (1 episode, 2005)
  - "Hold Tight", Episode: The Girl in the Fridge

== Acting credits ==
- The Eternal (1998)
- Lock 'N Load (Dennis Leary)
- Human File #752 (2007)
