= Lazy Eye (film) =

2016 film by Tim Kirkman

- Official promotional poster
- Directed by: Tim Kirkman
- Written by: Tim Kirkman
- Produced by: Todd Shotz; Tim Kirkman
- Starring: Lucas Near-Verbrugghe; Aaron Costa Ganis; Michaela Watkins
- Cinematography: Gabe Mayhan
- Edited by: Caitlin Dixon
- Music by: Steven Argila
- Production companies: T42 Entertainment; Sugarloaf Productions; Shawn & John Productions; 5 Child Productions
- Distributed by: Breaking Glass Pictures
- Release dates: June 17, 2016 (PIFF); November 11, 2016 (United States)
- Running time: 87 minutes
- Country: United States
- Language: English

Lazy Eye is a 2016 American romantic comedy-drama film written, directed, and co-produced by Tim Kirkman. It stars Lucas Near-Verbrugghe, Aaron Costa Ganis, and Michaela Watkins. It follows a graphic designer who, after experiencing problems with his eyesight, reconnects with an ex-boyfriend he hasn't seen or heard from in 15 years.

== Synopsis ==
At the same time that Dean, a successful graphic designer in Los Angeles, notices a sudden change in his vision due to middle age, an ex-lover from 15 years earlier contacts him unexpectedly in hopes of rekindling their relationship. When the two meet at a vacation house in the desert near Joshua Tree, secrets are revealed and passions rekindled that threaten to upend both of their lives. Forty-eight hours later, neither will ever be the same.

== Cast ==
- Lucas Near-Verbrugghe as Dean
- Aaron Costa Ganis as Alex
- Michaela Watkins as Mel
- Drew Barr as Optometrist
- Debbie Jaffe as Bartender
- Michael Rubenstone as Bar Manager
- Harrison Givens as Chatty Grad
- Renée Willett as Waitress

== Production ==
Lazy Eye was produced by Todd Shotz and Tim Kirkman through their company T42 Entertainment, in collaboration with Sugarloaf Productions, Shawn & John Productions, and 5 Child Productions. John Ainsworth, Gill Holland, Zvi Howard Rosenman, and Leesa Wagner served as executive producers. The original score was composed by Steven Argila.

The film was shot in Los Angeles and Joshua Tree, California in 12 days.

== Release ==
Lazy Eye premiered at the Provincetown International Film Festival on June 17, 2016. In August 2016, Breaking Glass Pictures acquired North American distribution rights to the film, and released it in theaters on November 11.

== Reception ==
=== Critical response ===
On the review aggregator website Rotten Tomatoes, 62% of 13 critics' reviews are positive, with an average rating of 6.7/10. Metacritic, which uses a weighted average, assigned the film a score of 39 out of 100, based on 5 critics, indicating "generally unfavorable" reviews.

David Rooney of The Hollywood Reporter called Lazy Eye "tedious" and wrote, "The locations are certainly pretty, as are the actors with their tidy matching beards, lounging about in tasteful nude scenes with lots of meticulous crotch-masking. Some of those moments are almost Austin Powers-worthy. But Kirkman's characters are not the least bit distinctive." Rooney also described it as a "drippy, cliché-ridden movie."

Owen Gleiberman of Variety gave a positive review, stating that the film "is so well-written and acted you feel like you're eavesdropping" and "is voyeuristic, but in a far more refined and emotionally sophisticated way." Gleiberman also opined that it "is a small-scale movie, but there are far bigger dramas that don’t leave this kind of afterglow."

Stephen Holden of The New York Times concluded his review by writing, "Lazy Eye has realistic dialogue and believable performances by its stars. But unless you consider subjects like saltwater swimming pools and the movie Harold and Maude fascinating topics, Lazy Eye has little to say. On a more personal level, the conversation touches on issues like monogamy and raising children, but what is said is merely superficial; yada, yada, yada."

Katie Walsh of the Los Angeles Times called the film "sexy and emotional" and commented that "Kirkman and cinematographer Gabe Mayhan capture the sun-dappled beauty of the landscape, and the central performances both anchor and lift the film." Walsh also wrote, "A couple of flashbacks color in their history but feel unnecessary, as the script and actors ably express the complicated history between the two men."
