= Loggerheads (2005 film) =

- Movie poster
- Directed by: Tim Kirkman
- Written by: Caitlin Dixon; Tim Kirkman
- Produced by: Gill Holland
- Starring: Kip Pardue; Michael Kelly; Tess Harper; Bonnie Hunt; Chris Sarandon; Robin Weigert; Michael Learned
- Cinematography: Oliver Bokelberg
- Edited by: Caitlin Dixon
- Music by: Mark Geary
- Distributed by: Strand Releasing
- Release date: January 2005
- Running time: 95 minutes
- Country: United States
- Language: English

Loggerheads is an independent film written and directed by Tim Kirkman, produced by Gill Holland and released in the United States by Strand Releasing in October 2005. The film stars Bonnie Hunt, Tess Harper, Michael Kelly, Chris Sarandon, Kip Pardue and Michael Learned and also stars Robin Weigert, Ann Owens Pierce, Valerie Watkins, Trevor Gagnon, Kelly Mizell, Craig Walker, Michael Esper and Joanne Pankow.

== Plot ==
Inspired by true events, Loggerheads tells the story of an adoption "triad" — birth mother, child, and adoptive parents — each in three interwoven stories in the days leading up to Mother's Day over the course of three years, and each in one of the three distinctive geographical regions of North Carolina: Appalachian Mountains, Piedmont (a broad, gently hilly plateau) and Atlantic Coastal Plain.

In mountainous Asheville, Grace (Bonnie Hunt), an airport car-rental agent living with her mother (Michael Learned), quits her job and embarks on a long-delayed quest: facing the legal barriers that keep her from finding the son she gave up for adoption when she was a teenager. Across the state in Kure Beach, Mark (Kip Pardue), a young man obsessed with saving loggerhead sea turtles, meets George (Michael Kelly), a friendly motel owner, who offers him a place to stay. In the center of the state is the small town of Eden, where a minister's wife (Tess Harper) struggles to confront her conservative husband (Chris Sarandon) over their estrangement from their son.

== Production ==
Irish singer-songwriter and composer Mark Geary wrote the original score as well as two songs for the film. The music of singer-songwriter Patty Griffin is also featured prominently, and sonaBLAST! Records released the soundtrack.

Loggerheads was filmed on location primarily in Wilmington, North Carolina in May 2004.

== Accolades ==
After its debut at the 2005 Sundance Film Festival, where it was nominated for the Grand Jury Prize, Loggerheads screened at festivals throughout the U.S. and abroad. The film won the Audience Award at both the Nashville Film Festival and the Florida Film Festival, and took the top prize at Outfest, the Los Angeles Gay and Lesbian Film Festival.
