= Peoria Babylon =

1997 film

- Directed by: Steven Diller
- Written by: Steven Diller
- Produced by: Michael Caplan
- Starring: David Drake; Ann Cusack; The Lady Bunny; Matthew Pestorius; Paul Adelstein; Marilyn Pittman; Deane Clark
- Cinematography: Erick Bergstrom
- Edited by: Erick Bergstrom
- Music by: Bradley Parker Sparrow Joanie Pallatto
- Distributed by: Culture Q Connection
- Release date: November 1997
- Running time: 90 minutes
- Country: United States
- Language: English

Peoria Babylon is a 1997 American comedy directed by Steven Diller. It premiered at the Chicago Lesbian and Gay International Film Festival in November 1997. The cast features David Drake and Ann Cusack.

== Plot ==
Candy and her gay friend Jon are owners of a financially troubled art gallery in Peoria, Illinois. After exhausting their savings, they concoct a devious scheme in order to save the gallery in this screwball comedy.

They team up with a hunky con artist, the mob and a lesbian porn queen, but at the end little is left standing but their friendship.

== Cast ==
- David Drake as Jon Ashe
- Ann Cusack as Candy Dineen
- Matthew Pestorius as Matthew Perretti
- Paul Adelstein as Brad Kessler
- The Lady Bunny as Octavia DiMare
- Marilyn Pittman as Doris Kessler
- Dan Turek as Bill
- Deane Clark as Raul Kessler
- Michael Hagedorn as Ted Jamison
- William McGough as Detective Dillon
- Andrew Carrillo as Cop
- Anna Markin as Tina Rotblatt
- David Gould as Stanley
- Tom Ciappa as Private Dick
- William Graham Cole as Swensen
- Helen Caro as Adele
- Kel Mitchell as Beave
- Jeff Kenny as Willie
- Sam Perry as Minister
- Hank Donat as Poet
- Nikki Lewis as Sandy
- Lou Wynhoff as Museum Guard
- Ted Lyde as Wayne
- Wendy Lucker as Reporter
- Tom Holycross as Cop #2
- Dan Callahan as Drag Queen
- M.J. Loheed as German Tourist
- Aja as Drag Queen #2
- Tom Phisella as Hick Man
- Rita Symons as Hick Woman
- Phyllis Diller as Painting Owner
- Lora Adams as Angry Art Patron

== Reception ==
The Chicago Tribune called it "…wonderfully funny…charming all the way around." (November 7, 1997) and the Chicago Sun-Times said that it was "Wacky and witty." (November 14, 1997).

In Media Audiences and Identity: Self-Construction in the Fan Experience, Steve Bailey states that "Peoria Babylon, aims its satire at the world of high art and the peculiarities of the international art market".
