= Dear Jesse =

- Cover art of 2006 DVD
- Directed by: Tim Kirkman
- Written by: Tim Kirkman
- Produced by: Mary Beth Mann; Mike Morley
- Edited by: Joe Klotz
- Release date: 2006
- Running time: 82 minutes
- Country: United States
- Language: English

Dear Jesse is a 1998 American documentary film by Tim Kirkman that was released theatrically by Cowboy Pictures in 1998.

Using a first-person narrative style in the form of a "letter" to Senator Jesse Helms (R-NC), the filmmaker explores the parallels and differences between himself — an openly gay man — and the staunchly anti-gay rights public servant. The film also features interviews with Helms' foes and fans, community activists, novelists Lee Smith and Allan Gurganus, openly gay Carrboro mayor Mike Nelson, and people in the street, including a brief interview with Matthew Shepard, then a student at Catawba College.

== Production ==
Dear Jesse was produced by Mary Beth Mann and executive produced by Gill Holland. It was edited by Joe Klotz, with music by John Crooke and cinematography by Norwood Cheek.

== Reception ==
=== Critical reception ===
On review aggregator Rotten Tomatoes, the film holds an approval rating of 86% based on 7 reviews, with an average rating of 6.8/10.

=== Awards and nominations ===
In 1998, the film won the Audience Award at Frameline, the San Francisco Gay and Lesbian Film Festival, and was nominated for an Independent Spirit Award and was named Best Documentary of the Year (runner-up) by the Boston Society of Film Critics. After the film aired on the HBO/Cinemax “Reel Life” series, Kirkman was nominated for an Emmy Award (Documentary Writing Category).
