= List of Friday Night Dinner episodes =

Friday Night Dinner is a British sitcom which aired on Channel 4 from 2011 to 2020. It is about the Goodmans, a secular middle-class Jewish family who live in suburban London and is centred on them gathering for Shabbat dinner. They are often interrupted by their neighbour.

== Series overview ==
Series	Episodes	Originally released		Average UK viewers (millions) (Note: The average rating for the first three series have been calculated using 7-day viewing figures, while the ratings for the latter three series use 28-day viewing figures.)
Series	Episodes	First released	Last released	Average UK viewers (millions)
1	6	25 February 2011	8 April 2011	—N/a
2	6	7 October 2012	11 November 2012	—N/a
Special		24 December 2012		1.54
3	6	20 June 2014	25 July 2014	1.45
4	6	22 July 2016	26 August 2016	1.66
5	6	4 May 2018	8 June 2018	2.09
6	6	27 March 2020	1 May 2020	4.70

== List of episodes ==
=== Series 1 (2011) ===
The first series premiered on 25 February 2011.

Friday Night Dinner series 1
No. overall	No. in series	Title	Directed by	Written by	Original release date	U.K. viewers (millions) (Note: 7-day viewing figures for Channel 4 and HD, not including the Channel 4+1 rating.)
1	1	"The Sofabed"	Steve Bendelack	Robert Popper	25 February 2011	2.31
Mum and Dad are having a clear-out of their garage, but Dad is reluctant to throw away his many old New Scientist magazines. He ropes in younger son, estate agent Jonny, to secretly hide the stash of magazines that he is supposedly throwing out at his flat. Mum is excited because it is the final of MasterChef; elder son Adam and Jonny however, are not interested in the programme. Mum is trying to cook dinner. Their strange, lonely, middle-aged neighbour Jim, who is attracted to Mum and is accompanied by his Belgian Shepherd dog Wilson which he is afraid of – frequently interrupts them to use their toilet as he has broken his own. Dad tells Adam that he has ordered fifty copies of New Scientist from 1965 to be sent to him. Dad wrongly believes that Chris Parker (Matthew Holness) is coming to pick up their old sofa bed tomorrow. Adam and Jonny prank each other by spiking each other's drinks with salt. Chris arrives, surprising Dad, who was mistaken about the date. Chris wants it for when his ill father comes to stay with him. The sofabed becomes stuck between the banister and the wall while it is being carried downstairs. Mum sees Jonny put the magazines in his car, as well as the receipt for the back copies which Dad gave to Adam. Chris receives a call on his mobile phone informing him of his father's sudden death. Chris is horrified when drinking from a mug and a glass which have salt in them, and leaves. Jim tells Mum who has won MasterChef and the sofabed falls, breaking the balusters. First appearances of Adam, Jackie, Jim, Jonny, Martin and Wilson
2	2	"The Jingle"	Steve Bendelack	Robert Popper	4 March 2011	1.80
Adam and Jonny come home to see, through the window of the front room, Dad peering into his underpants with a magnifying glass. They are puzzled as to exactly what he is looking at. Mum is just trying to have a nice Friday night, but Jim, with Wilson, interrupts their meal. Dad takes Adam – who is single – into the toilet to have a private chat about "females". Soon the whole family are in the lavatory quizzing Adam, and Jonny is enjoying Adam's embarrassment. They pressure Adam into looking at Jewish dating sites on the Internet with Dad. Adam is disappointed when he hears the radio advertisement which he contributed music to and finds out that it only features a few notes of the tune. Mum questions Dad about his frequent use of the magnifying glass. He gradually admits that he was looking at a bee sting on his penis which was inflicted whilst he was urinating in the garden.
3	3	"The Curtains"	Steve Bendelack	Robert Popper	11 March 2011	N/A
Grandma (Frances Cuka) visits. Mum is delighted with the new set of curtains she has bought, which she says are cream. Mum is angry when Grandma and the boys say they hate them and that they are yellow, which does not suit the room. Dad drops Mum's beef casserole over the kitchen floor. It looks disgusting, yet Dad scoops it back into the dish. Adam spikes Jonny's water with gin. At the dinner table, Grandma spills something on her crotch. The doorbell rings, and the boys answer: it is Jim and Wilson. Jim does not say what he wants; Wilson licks Grandma's crotch. Back in the house, Grandma gives the boys each a wallet containing a pound coin each, Dad a wallet and Mum a yogurt. Jonny deliberately scares Adam by hiding in a black bin bag and jumping out of it, causing him to drop Mum's favourite dish that he is holding. Mum argues with Grandma about the curtains and how they speak to each other. Mum criticises Jonny for not bringing his girlfriend Alison to the house. Jonny leaves in a huff to go to the pub, The Black Boy, with Adam following him. Due to having very little cash on them, they share a half-pint of lager. They are disappointed when Jim arrives and joins them. Jim buys Wilson a pint of lager; it makes Wilson too drunk to walk. The boys carry Wilson home, accompanied by Jim. At home, Mum and Grandma are not talking, so Adam tells Mum and Grandma to apologise to each other to resolve the argument. Adam hides in a black bin bag to try and scare Jonny, but instead jumps out on Grandma by mistake, who collapses in shock. Mum comes to the realisation that the curtains do look yellow. First appearance of Grandma
4	4	"The Dress"	Steve Bendelack	Robert Popper	25 March 2011	1.59
When Mum finds out that Dad did not throw away his old boxes of science magazines during their clear-out, she is angry; so Dad builds a bonfire in the back garden and says that he will burn them all. Dad is pretending to burn them whilst squirrelling the boxes off to his shed. Jim calls at the front door with Wilson and returns bathroom scales that he had borrowed, after taking his shoes off and weighing himself at the door. Wilson walks off with the shoes and goes missing, leaving Jim distraught. After Mum calls Wilson, he returns with the shoes. Mum is pleased when her friend, Val (Tracy-Ann Oberman), visits with Val's new dress for her son Neil's wedding. She looks very similar to Mum: hair and clothes. Mum is disappointed when Jonny tells her that Alison will not be attending the wedding. She and Val try to get Tanya Green to go as Adam's guest, even though he does not want Tanya. Val tries on the dress and later it falls into a box of the magazines. Mum finds out that the magazines have not been burnt. Mum makes Dad burn the magazines and everyone is horrified when they notice that the dress is burning with them. First appearance of Val
5	5	"The Mercedes"	Steve Bendelack	Robert Popper	1 April 2011	1.79
It is Adam's birthday. As he opens the door of his Nissan car outside the house, a Mercedes almost hits him and his car. Inside it is a narcissistic middle-aged acquaintance of theirs, Sheila Bloom (Frances Barber), whom the Goodmans dislike and call Bitchface; her husband Eddie is driving. Bitchface is intensely proud of her Mercedes, and after some catty remarks, she speeds off. Mum reveals that Dad once dated Bitchface before his relationship with Mum, which the boys are puzzled by. Dad is cooking dinner for the family (including Grandma) because Mum is "crippled" (in the commotion of a jellyfish sting, she sprained an ankle, leaving both of her legs damaged). Adam is disappointed by his presents: a microwave oven, an electric knife sharpener, a miniature vacuum cleaner and – most controversially – a book about the SS. Jim calls at the house with Wilson, annoying the Goodmans. Jonny falsely claims to Jim that it is traditional to give a big basket of green fruit to the eldest son of a Jewish family on his birthday. Dad cooks and serves Adam's birthday dinner, but the Goodmans are horrified by his "prison food": beef that was overcooked to a dry black lump and a few very small potatoes. The family therefore abandon it and go to a Chinese restaurant, driven by Dad in their Saab car. They are horrified to see that Bitchface is there. An awkward chat ensues between Mum and Bitchface. As they leave, Dad and Eddie accidentally take each others' coats, so Dad drives the family to Bitchface's house to exchange them. After being vague all evening about how far he went sexually with Bitchface, Dad reveals whilst parked outside Bitchface's house that he kissed her breasts. He knocks on Bitchface's front door and they exchange the coats. He then accidentally reverses into Bitchface's Mercedes, horrifying her and amusing the Goodmans. Jim remembers Jonny's misinformation and brings Adam a wicker basket full of green fruit, much to Adam's confusion.
6	6	"The Date"	Steve Bendelack	Robert Popper	8 April 2011	1.54
Adam comes home surprised to find the house looking immaculate, with classical music playing in the living room, Mum's posh bowls on the dinner table, Dad wearing a smart suit, and – most mysteriously – the table set for five. The doorbell rings and in walks Tanya Green (Tuppence Middleton), a pretty girl who lives in Elstree and whom Mum has been trying to fix up with Adam for months. During dinner, Dad embarrasses everyone with his inappropriate conversation. Jonny tricks Tanya into thinking Adam has wet himself by pouring water on his trousers. He then accidentally gives Adam a nosebleed whilst trying to open a pickle jar. Adam and Tanya go to the shops to buy milk, a ruse by Jackie to bring them together. They become more friendly, then Tanya receives a text from Jackie's phone asking her to buy condoms for Adam – which had been sent by Jonny. Later Adam sees Tanya and Jonny passionately French kissing outside the house in the garden. Jim, who has been locked out of his house because Wilson has swallowed his keys, tries to give Adam advice about girls.

=== Series 2 (2012) ===
Unlike the first series, the second series was broadcast on Sunday nights and began airing on 7 October 2012. A Christmas special aired on Christmas Eve 2012.

Friday Night Dinner series 2
No. overall	No. in series	Title	Directed by	Written by	Original release date	U.K. viewers (millions)
7	1	"Buggy"	Martin Dennis	Robert Popper	7 October 2012	N/A
When Jonny finds Adam's old diary, he learns a secret: when Adam was eleven, he secretly dumped Jonny's beloved "Pandy" panda bear teddy in the wheelie bin, never to be seen again. This unleashes a war between the brothers, with Jonny threatening to destroy Adam's equally beloved old rabbit soft toy, "Buggy". Fights break out in every room, with Mum and Dad unable to control their two adult sons, who are acting childishly and maniacally. Desperate to hide his precious comfort toy from his angry brother, Adam unwisely asks Jim to look after Buggy. Jim later grows attached to Buggy and is reluctant to return him. He then somehow loses Buggy in a lake. Martin repeatedly sneezes on things. When dinner is served, Martin sneezes all over the food and Jackie's delicious Friday night dinner is ruined. He sneezes whilst holding an electric lawn mower, causing it to shred Buggy.
8	2	"Mr Morris"	Martin Dennis	Robert Popper	14 October 2012	N/A
The boys are excited, because 78-year-old Grandma is coming for dinner, and is bringing her new lover, whom Mum describes as her 'male companion'. 82-year-old Lou Anthony Morris (Harry Landis) is a selfish, angry, aggressive, arrogant, married man. He sports a trilby hat, a toothbrush moustache, and is obsessed with cleanliness; wiping his hands on the bathroom curtains when there is no hand towel. He is a very bad driver, parking his battered old car right up against the front doorstep, smashing an indicator. He also has a strong dislike of dogs, including Jim's dog, Wilson. And he is also married to a 93-year-old woman. The Goodmans hate him and cannot understand what Grandma sees in him; Dad hides in his shed. Lou and the boys go to a garage, where Lou buys bulbs for his car indicator and condoms. When Adam and Jonny try to take the condoms out of Lou's pocket whilst he is sleeping, Lou loses his temper. Lou rips a light fitting out of the wall and his shirt and tries to provoke Adam, Jonny and then Dad into physically fighting him. The family stand in the drive, locking Lou inside until he has another (his 4th) heart attack. First appearance of Mr Morris
9	3	"The Loft"	Martin Dennis	Robert Popper	21 October 2012	N/A
To get out of cleaning the loft with Dad and Adam, Jonny says that he has dislocated his right shoulder, and wears a sling. When Adam discovers that he is lying, he threatens to tell Mum immediately. Jonny tells him that if he does so, he will tell her about Adam disliking his date with Val's niece Hayley Posner, whom Adam did not call back, because she smelled like Mum. Mum is holding a grudge against Dad, but the boys do not know why. Val comes round for dinner to lend Mum moral support. Dad and the boys go to The Black Boy; Mum and Val arrive soon after, and the barman ejects Mum and Dad for arguing. After Adam injures Jonny's left shoulder, forcing the family to take him to hospital, Adam and Jonny reveal each other's secrets. Dad reveals that the reason Mum is being hostile to him is that he dreamt about having a milk bath with Diana, Princess of Wales.
10	4	"The New Car"	Martin Dennis	Robert Popper	28 October 2012	N/A
Martin is very excited to have bought a new fax machine. The boys do not understand the point of using a fax machine when you have email. He likes the machine because you do not have to read everything off a screen. Jonny, who is an estate agent, has been given the use of a company car. It has an estate agent-themed, fake brick roof on top. Mum believes that Jonny bagged the car because he has been having a fling with his boss, 43-year-old Elizabeth "Liz" (Lesley Vickerage). Mum is not happy, and an awkward scene arises when the family bump into Liz outside Jonny's office. Mum has put Dad on a diet – "no chocolate, no cheese, no cakes" – for two weeks (he compares the diet to living in Nazi Germany); but he has made the boys smuggle in food for him, which he keeps hidden in the downstairs toilet. Jim pops round with his dog Wilson. He is drunk and celebrating the birthday of Wilson, who is 4 or 9. Jim has made Wilson a birthday cake. Later, returning from a 'family spin' in Jonny's car, the family find a window open, and that a burglar has stolen only the fax machine, but Jim reassures Dad that he can have one of his 5 fax machines. They phone the police and Jim tells them that the burglar pretended to be a cousin who had lost his key, and that Jim helped him get through the window. After the police leave, Jim tells the family that there was a second burglar, who is still in the house and the Goodmans and Jim unintentionally scare him off. He drives off in Jonny's car. First appearance of Liz
11	5	"The Yoghurts"	Martin Dennis	Robert Popper	4 November 2012	N/A
Jonny wants to split up with Liz, but is too scared to do so – especially because it is her birthday tomorrow. Adam, meanwhile, is happy to keep teasing him about her age. Grandma brings 36 yogurts, and advises him to take Liz out dancing, before showing him how to dance in the kitchen. While they dance to the music on the radio, it transpires that it is the music for the news headlines, and before long, Jonny and Grandma are dancing to the news. Dad is drying fish in the understairs cupboard. Dad tries to fix the lock on the boot of Adam's car, at which point Grandma climbs in the boot to retrieve her yogurts. Dad closes the boot, accidentally locking her in. Jim tells them that his friend Mike is a locksmith, but that he does not have his phone number. They drive to Mike's house, where he informs them that he is a town planner, not a locksmith. Whilst parked outside Mike's house, the car is towed away. The Goodmans retrieve the car and Grandma, then the family go home. Liz turns up at the house, where Dad bores her with conversation, Grandma mistakes her for a man due to Liz having recently cut her hair short. Jonny ends their relationship, which Liz reacts to by crying. However, the Goodmans then reconcile and laugh when Dad tries to break up a fight against Adam and Jonny when Adam locks Jonny out the house, the episode ends with Grandma asking Liz if she wants a yoghurt, shocking and embarrassing her. Last appearance of Liz
12	6	"The Mouse"	Martin Dennis	Robert Popper	11 November 2012	N/A
The boys come home to find the house in a bad state. Builders have been in, and have left a lot of mess. On top of this, there is a mouse in the house, due to which, Mum is in the shed, because she is scared of mice. Dad – who is clueless in the kitchen – is in charge of dinner. Dad tells Mum that he killed the mouse and broke it into two pieces, after which Mum returns to the house. Jim visits to see if he can help around the house and is electrocuted when he touches wires which Dad is trying to fix. Mum revives him with the kiss of life. Out of guilt, Mum asks Jim to have dinner with them – which Dad and the boys are horrified at. They decide to pretend that Mum did not make apple crumble. The mouse is alive in the dining room. Jim is delighted to have his first ever dinner with the Goodmans. Jim behaves bizarrely: he is wearing a yarmulke which he made by cutting a circular piece out of the shirt he is wearing and he throws a plate against the wall, smashing it. He asks if Martin and the boys are circumcised. The mouse climbs onto Jim's plate, which Mum reacts to by screaming and running out of the room. They continue eating in the shed. As Jim and the Goodmans are walking through the house and Jim is about to leave, Wilson finds the crumble in a cupboard in the kitchen. Jim and the Goodmans sit in another downstairs room, which is being decorated and Wilson eats Jim's bowl of crumble. Jim tilts a stepladder which has a large open can of red oil-based paint on top of it – spilling the paint on himself, the television, the floor and the wall. The paint on his face prevents him from seeing and he spreads paint on other walls and the banisters with his hands. After showering, he deliberately electrocutes himself in order to again receive the kiss of life from Jackie.

=== Special (2012) ===
Friday Night Dinner 2012 special
No.	Title	Directed by	Written by	Original release date	U.K. viewers (millions)
13	"Christmas"	Martin Dennis	Robert Popper	24 December 2012	1.54
It is Christmas Day, so Mum has made Christmas dinner. The boys are pleased that Grandma is coming round, but horrified that Dad's mother – Horrible Grandma (Rosalind Knight) – is coming too. Horrible Grandma arrives with her chronically ill dog, Boudacea which has to wear an oxygen mask. Horrible Grandma hates Mum's turkey because it is very dry due to being overcooked, and Mum feels insulted when Horrible Grandma brings her own turkey with her to eat. Dad and the boys are jealous, as they too secretly hate Mum’s turkey. Mum embarrasses Jonny by making him wear a childish jumper with a dragon on it. Adam chokes on the turkey and Dad makes a bad attempt at administering the Heimlich manoeuvre, then puts the oxygen mask on him. After dinner, the grandmas argue and pull each others' hair. Dad breaks them up by pouring water over their heads. Jim turns up three times; on the third occasion, he is dressed as Father Christmas. After this, Boudacea dies. First appearance of Horrible Grandma. One of three episodes that did not take place on Friday night.

=== Series 3 (2014) ===
The third series saw the show return to its Friday night timeslot and began airing on 20 June 2014.

Friday Night Dinner series 3
No. overall	No. in series	Title	Directed by	Written by	Original release date	U.K. viewers (millions)
14	1	"The Girlfriend"	Martin Dennis	Robert Popper	20 June 2014	1.56
Mum is pleased when Adam finally brings a girl, Emma (Sophia Di Martino), home for dinner. They have been dating for nine weeks. The evening is ruined when the family suddenly have to babysit eight-year-old Katie, who has a major crush on Adam and is determined to become Adam's girlfriend. She is a daughter of Susan, a neighbour who is visiting Katie's grandmother in hospital. Emma's sister Helen sends Adam photos of herself in a bikini on his mobile phone. Katie insults Emma and Jonny, then grabs Adam's phone. She tells Adam that she saw the photos of Helen on his phone and will tell Emma about them if he does not hold her hand, spend a lot of time playing with her and let her put make up on his face. Emma is annoyed at Dad's boring and inappropriate conversation and Adam frequently looking at his phone. Jim arrives and Jonny tricks Jim into thinking that Katie is Adam's girlfriend. Emma is angry at Adam for devoting his time to Katie, and decides to leave, causing Adam to snap at Katie. Adam falls over and Emma goes to his room to get him his asthma inhaler, and is horrified to see that the walls are covered with pictures of scantily-clad young women, which Jonny had put there earlier that evening. She goes downstairs, hands him his inhaler and looks at his phone. She angrily leaves.
15	2	"The Fox"	Martin Dennis	Robert Popper	27 June 2014	1.44
Mum is training to become a counselor and Adam is annoyed when he thinks she is practising on him. The boys find out that Dad has been secretly hiding a dead fox in the outside chest freezer because he wants to have it stuffed. Mum needs to use the freezer, so Dad pays the boys in a desperate attempt to hide the fox from her. This involves moving it several times and lying to Mum, then later to Val. When Jim visits, Dad tells Mum that Jim is on drugs and that he has been lending money to Jim. Mum tries to counsel him, and is puzzled that he has not been taking drugs. Dad then claims that he has been acting strangely due to having a surprise for her. Whilst he and the boys prepare to give her a box of chocolates, Wilson drags the fox out of the understairs cupboard.
16	3	"Mr Morris Returns"	Martin Dennis	Robert Popper	4 July 2014	1.18
Jim collects money for charity, while dressed in a full dog costume, to which he has attached genitals and Martin has become obsessed with his calculator. The family are distraught when 80-year-old Grandma tells them that she is in love with 85-year-old Lou and invites him to the house. She tells them that his wife died aged 94. She has him read an apology for his behaviour when he last visited. She wrote it for him and he reads it out half-heartedly. She tells the family that he is much better than he used to be and that when he becomes angry, he goes to his car, where he screams – something he then does in reaction to Jonny saying that he dislikes coffee. Grandma and Lou have been back together for six months, and it is clear that he is still awful and they are horrified when he proposes to her and she accepts, believing that he has changed. He wrongly believes that there are punk rockers everywhere, and when he takes the family to a bowling alley, he complains to a member of staff about the punk rockers there, despite none being present. Jim is at the bowling alley, and when Lou thinks that Grandma and Jim are flirting with each other, he attacks Jim and tries to start a fight with him. Martin tries to break it up, losing his calculator in the process but is relieved when he is carrying a spare calculator.
17	4	"The Anniversary"	Martin Dennis	Robert Popper	11 July 2014	1.57
Mum and Dad's wedding anniversary goes badly. Dad gives Mum a portrait of her that he painted that looks more like Margaret Thatcher than her. Mum is horrified by Jonny's new tattoo on his outer upper right arm which is of a skull accompanied by the phrase live fast die young in Latin. Jonny tells Mum, Dad and Adam that he has lost his job. Jim visits the house whilst very drowsy due to having mistakenly swallowed Wilson's sleeping tablets. He subsequently sleepwalks around their house, during which he urinates on the portrait – just after Grandma arrives.
18	5	"The Piano"	Martin Dennis	Robert Popper	18 July 2014	1.34
Dad mistakenly ordered huge quantities of some items when online shopping. He has bought a piano. A very sarcastic, blind piano tuner, Mr Greencock, visits to tune it. He frequently exploits his condition to guilt-trip the family. The family dine in a restaurant; whilst there, they see Val apparently on a date with a man (Renton Skinner). Val tells the Goodmans – who are surprised to see her with a man other than her husband Larry (Steve Furst) – that he is her distant cousin, then cries and leaves. The Goodmans arrive home to be told by Greencock that Jim is present due to a fire in his house. Mum throws Greencock out after he jokes that the house is on fire; in revenge, he enters the house through the unlocked side door and repeatedly smashes the piano's keys with a hammer. Larry accuses Val of having an affair and visits the Goodmans' house, trying to find the other man – incorrectly assuming it to be Greencock, Martin and Jim. First appearance of Larry
19	6	"The Big Day"	Martin Dennis	Robert Popper	25 July 2014	1.63
Grandma and Lou's wedding is to take place today at a synagogue. The family attend, but are distraught at her bringing Lou into their family. When the rabbi (Paul Kaye) asks her if she will take him for her husband, she suddenly collapses and an ambulance is called which drives her and her family towards hospital. During the journey, she tells them that she faked being ill in order to avoid marrying a horrible man. The whole Goodman family is ecstatic. Last appearance of Mr Morris. One of three episodes that did not take place on Friday night.

=== Series 4 (2016) ===
The fourth series began airing on 22 July 2016.

Friday Night Dinner series 4
No. overall	No. in series	Title	Directed by	Written by	Original release date	U.K. viewers (millions) (Note: 28-day viewing figures, including Channel 4+1.)
20	1	"The Two Tonys"	Martin Dennis	Robert Popper	22 July 2016	1.80
Dad accidentally invites someone whom he hates round for dinner: Tony Michaels (Jason Watkins), an annoying man who has a very bad sense of humour and blinks slowly – having mistaken him for another man named Tony (Tony Sampson) whom he likes. Dad tries to get rid of him by falsely claiming that Grandma died very recently in Florida, leading to the whole family having to spend the evening pretending to mourn her death. Tony finds out she is alive when she walks into the house. After Tony's departure, the family find out he is a habitual thief and has stolen several of their possessions. Martin then attacks Tony and attempts to shove a pineapple up his anus.
21	2	"The Carpet Cleaner"	Martin Dennis	Robert Popper	29 July 2016	1.80
Val is at the house because of an argument with Larry. The boys don't want Val to stay for dinner and are ecstatic when Larry calls her saying he is parked outside and about to take her to Paris on the Eurostar. It is Dad's annual hinge-oiling evening but when he accidentally spills oil on his and Mum's bedroom carpet, he tries to clean it up himself. When that fails, he secretly hires a cleaner (John Sessions). To allow the cleaner to work on the carpet, Dad takes Mum and the boys to Mario's restaurant, where a young pretty waitress whom Adam is attracted to works. At the restaurant, Jonny tricks Mum and Dad into thinking that the waitress in question is one who is plain and considerably older, until Adam corrects them. Arriving home, the family find Val on their doorstep, crying that she has had another argument with Larry, this time about the Euro. itself. Martin is pleased to find that the oil spill has been successfully removed, but then the boys find the cleaner lying dead on the floor. Jackie enters the room and to avoid her seeing the dead cleaner, Martin suggests that they should go to Paris by Eurostar. Jim is taking care of his brother's cat, Watson, while he is in "well, not prison", as Jim puts it, and it is revealed that he is scared of cats as well. Wilson is absent from this episode.
22	3	"Congratulations"	Martin Dennis	Robert Popper	5 August 2016	1.57
The family are due to celebrate Adam winning an award for his musical talent. However, it is overshadowed when Jonny arrives home from a holiday in Las Vegas, bringing his new American wife Lisa (Skye Bennett). The family are shocked at his marriage, because he had not mentioned it – or her – prior to his return, while Grandma is more happy for the couple. The couple – who barely know each other – split up. It is Jim's birthday. Last physical appearance of Grandma
23	4	"The Pyjamas"	Martin Dennis	Robert Popper	12 August 2016	1.51
Adam has been staying at Mum and Dad's all week. Mum's constant fussing over him has made him start behaving like a little boy. Martin is frustrated that he has to keep driving over to Grandma's house to return things. Jim passes his driving test on his 15th attempt. Soon after, Jonny takes Adam out of the house to give Grandma her glasses. Jonny gives Adam a wedgie, which then tears his pyjama bottoms and wraps Jonny's shirt around him after threatening to rub his penis on him. The boys are left half-naked, but they see Jim in his new car (which is covered in paint). They end up at a shop and Martin has to drive 50 miles to pick them up after Adam left his keys in his car. As they return Mum lets them know that Grandma did not need her glasses after all as she was "busy". The family sit down and eat hot drinks and meringues.
24	5	"The Funeral"	Martin Dennis	Robert Popper	19 August 2016	1.51
It is the funeral of Uncle Saul, who was in his late eighties. His sister 'Horrible Grandma' arrives for the funeral: she is demanding, breaks a cabinet and is arrested after damaging a hairdressing salon. Auntie Val arrives at the police station to do Horrible Grandma's hair, only for her to insist on wearing a hat. Jim and Wilson arrive at the cemetery with black balloons soon after the family. Dad, who knew nothing about Saul, gives an awful speech, mainly about Saul's defective anus. The coffin is accidentally dropped as it is being taken to the grave, causing the lid to break. Wilson, whom Jim has put on a vegetarian diet, runs over and begins to eat the corpse. Jonny wants to watch the Monaco Grand Prix on TV and is disappointed that the funeral is happening at the same time. One of three episodes that did not take place on Friday night.
25	6	"For Sale"	Robert Popper	Robert Popper	26 August 2016	1.79
The boys arrive home horrified to find a 'For Sale' sign in front of the house. They try to stop Mum and Dad from selling what has been the family home for 28 years. One of the people who views the house is Jim, who uses a ladder to look at the roof in the dark. The ladder falls, damaging Dad's car and leaving Jim hanging off the front of the house. The boys learn where they were “formed”: Adam was “formed” in the car and Jonny was “formed” in the alley behind the butcher’s. Mum and Dad change their minds about selling the house.

=== Series 5 (2018) ===
The fifth series began airing on 4 May 2018.

Friday Night Dinner series 5
No. overall	No. in series	Title	Directed by	Written by	Original release date	U.K. viewers (millions)
26	1	"The Other Jackie"	Martin Dennis	Robert Popper	4 May 2018	2.60
Mum and Dad buy a hot tub. Dad has added toilet cleaner to the water. Jim visits the Goodmans. He insists that they take Wilson in and pretend that he is theirs. He says that is necessary because his sister Jackie (Rosie Cavaliero), who is scared of dogs, is visiting him. Wilson causes a lot of damage to the Goodmans' furniture. Jonny and Adam go to pick up food they had ordered, and find out that Jim and his 'sister' are on a date in the same restaurant, where Jim accidentally sets fire to the tablecloth, setting off their sprinkler. They go back to the Goodmans' house, where Jim says that he is locked out of his house because he accidentally dropped his keys into a drain after he slipped on a worm. He admits that she is a date whom he met online, rather than his sister. The two have a very uncomfortable dinner with the family. Despite her annoying laugh and boring conversation, they warm to her when it becomes clear that she is bonding with Jim, but she then offends them by saying that she disliked her colleagues when she was a legal secretary because they were Jews, and they throw her out, and ask Jim and Wilson to go as well. Later the boys reluctantly agree to go in the hot tub with them – until they find Jim naked in it doing his 20,000 shaloms penance in the "Jewish bath".
27	2	"The Tin Of Meat"	Martin Dennis	Robert Popper	11 May 2018	2.22
Val, who is divorcing Larry, moved in ten days ago. She has taken over, which Dad is resentful of and the boys are puzzled by. Jonny's boss Nick (Kiell Smith-Bynoe) is coming round to pick up some keys. Mum and Val are very keen to meet him, much to Jonny's annoyance. Adam pranks Jonny by swapping the keys, causing Jonny to give Nick the wrong key twice. Val repeatedly refuses to let Larry have their car. Later during the meal, Larry drives off with the car. Val takes out revenge by covering the car with crumble, and Larry retaliates by covering Jonny and Dad's cars with curry. Dad is hiding a tin of meat in the shed which expired in September 1996, claiming it brings good luck. Val hides it away, prompting Dad to search the house for it. When he finds it in Val's handbag, he opens it and eats it, claiming that it is still edible. He quickly becomes ill with food poisoning; and is taken away in an ambulance to hospital However, Jim reassures the boys that he, himself, eats 30-year-old meat. Last appearance of Larry
28	3	"The Surprise"	Martin Dennis	Robert Popper	18 May 2018	1.89
Jim knocks on the door and gives Jackie a book which is for her but was delivered to his house. He had opened the book, which is about the menopause. Jackie intends to give it to Val, who wants the fact that she is menopausal to be a secret. It is Mum's birthday and she is having a surprise party for 44 guests. She has secretly organised it herself. The party is a failure – Dad accidentally gives the invitees the wrong date and gets 6 people – one of whom is Sarah (who did the curtains 5 years ago) whom Jackie does not remember – to come the house. Jim gives Jackie the nightgown that his mother lived and died in. Dad invites 'Horrible Grandma', despite no-one liking her. Val is angry and upset with Jackie because Jackie knew about her own surprise party in advance and for letting people know that she is going through the menopause. All the guests – except Horrible Grandma – leave. The family go to a Chinese restaurant, and Adam receives a phone call from Horrible Grandma, telling them that the kitchen is flooded. Jackie gives her the nightgown. Adam's car bonnet is abnormally hot. The front of the car later bursts into flames and has to be towed away, much to Adam sadly saying "My lovely terrible car".
29	4	"Lord Luck"	Robert Popper	Robert Popper	25 May 2018	2.02
The smoke alarm on the kitchen ceiling is faulty, but Dad refuses to have it fixed. When it goes off, he turns it off using a large carrot instead of a wooden spoon. Jonny's friend Ben visits for dinner. He is upset and depressed because his fiancée Lucy recently ended their relationship at his stag do. The family and Ben, a vegetarian, are horrified at Dad having killed a crow by beating it with a hammer and having put it in the kitchen bin. Jonny finds Dad's old ventriloquist dummy Lord Luck in the loft. Dad is delighted that it has been found after twenty years. He annoys Ben and his family and terrifies Jim with it. Its face is accidentally melted when it is put on the cooker while it is hot, making him look like The Elephant Man. This cheers up Ben, who laughs as he takes the taxi home.
30	5	"The Violin"	Martin Dennis	Robert Popper	1 June 2018	2.02
Dad annoys the family by repeatedly using his megaphone (Jonny found it when he was clearing out a flat) in the house. He frequently looks at hair under his microscope, and infuriates his family by plucking or attempting to pluck their hairs out. The police knock on the Goodmans' door and tell that there has been a burglary nearby. The family learn that Jim is the victim. Another burglary happens later during the night. Adam is expected to play his violin for Grandma, so he is delighted when she cannot visit due to her having had a fall. Jonny invites Val and her son Spencer (who the boys claim cheated in his medical exams, although it was never proven) to the house – from Mum's mobile phone – in order to annoy Adam. Adam is not happy when he is forced to play his violin to an audience of the family, Val and Spencer – whilst Grandma is listening via the phone before she commences in defrosting the freezer. Jonny is relishing every moment of Adam's embarrassment. However, things end badly for Jonny when Adam injures Jonny’s nose with the megaphone, leaving him at the hands of Spencer much to Adam’s satisfaction. Last appearance of Grandma (as a voice on the phone)
31	6	"Wilson"	Martin Dennis	Robert Popper	8 June 2018	1.78
The boys are threatened by their parents with no crumble if they do not help to assemble a wooden shelf. Martin forgets to put any apple in the crumble. Jim's dog Wilson frequently defecates in the Goodmans' flowerbed and later dies in their front garden. At Jim's request, Wilson is buried in the flowerbed by Adam and Jonny. To Mum's horror, Jim constructs and plants a cross, which is several feet tall, in Wilson's grave. Adam is awaiting an important phone call from work in regard to an American client. Jonny repeatedly rings Adam's phone, making him think the call is from work – until Adam smashes Jonny's phone with a hammer. Adam's phone rings from Wilson's grave, Jonny having put it there during the burial. Last appearance of Wilson

=== Series 6 (2020) ===
The sixth and final series began broadcasting on 27 March 2020.

Friday Night Dinner series 6
No. overall	No. in series	Title	Directed by	Written by	Original release date	U.K. viewers (millions)
32	1	"The Caravan"	Martin Dennis	Robert Popper	27 March 2020	5.36
Jonny and Adam arrive to see workmen carrying out repairs in the street. Parked in the drive is an old caravan which is in a terrible condition and is standing on bricks. Mum tells them that Dad bought it several days ago and has dinner in it alone every evening. Mum and the boys hate it and brand it a "shithole", angering Dad; she refuses to go inside it. Dad talks to Mum, the boys – and later, Jim – via the "talkie-walkie". The boys tell Mum that they have new girlfriends, both of whom are named Lucy. She is delighted about them being in relationships, but disappointed that her sons do not want them to meet the girls. Jim introduces his new dog, Milson, to the Goodmans. Dad takes the cooked chicken from the kitchen; Adam and Jonny bring it back in the house. Jim’s house is badly flooded by sewage and workmen are repairing the damaged pipe which caused it. He asks to eat some of their chicken in the caravan, which the Goodmans allow. The caravan's toilet is full of excrement; Jim brings its septic tank in to the house. He accidentally drops it, spilling its contents onto the floor of the Goodmans' dining room. The Goodmans start to eat in the caravan, but are interrupted by it falling from its bricks and crashing into the house. They exit the caravan, which then catches fire. First appearance of Milson
33	2	"The Plastic Bag"	Martin Dennis	Robert Popper	3 April 2020	4.68
Dad is obsessed with trying to remove a plastic bag from a nearby tree. He assembles a 'rake device thing' to get it down, but smashes Adam's car windscreen in the process. Adam talks about an interview he gave for a magazine; Mum is angry with him because he talked about the family as well as Val – but not her. Jonny has a silver puffer jacket that is frequently made fun of for looking like a space suit. Val visits and is horrified that Adam did not mention Mum in the interview and spanks his bottom several times because of his refusal to say "I love you" to her. Dad hires a man and a cherry picker for £300 to remove the bag. After he does, Mum and Adam have the man put the jacket into the top of the tree.
34	3	"The Au Pair"	Martin Dennis	Robert Popper	10 April 2020	4.40
Gibby (Sally Phillips) – an overemotional middle-aged Swiss woman who was the boys' au pair for a year when Adam was four and Jonny was a baby – surprises the Goodman family by arriving at the house. She is upset that the boys cannot remember her. Jim visits, wanting a plaster for a tiny cut on his finger. He is strongly attracted to Gibby, which she reciprocates. He asks her to apply the plaster. After Jim leaves and Gibby uses the downstairs toilet, she asks if they can all go for cream teas together. When Mum says no, Gibby starts crying, leading to Mum changing her mind. Dad bumps into Neville, whom he was at school with, but mistakenly calls him Bradley. Dad is surprised that Neville does not have a left arm and asks him how he lost it; offended, Neville replies that he was born without it. Jim follows the Goodmans to the hotel where the family and Gibby are going to have cream teas; Jim joins them and has tea with a lot of cream in it. Gibby is upset by the cream tea not being as good as she remembers, and locks herself in the downstairs toilet. Jim helps her feel better by dancing and singing. The Goodmans return home after Neville burst the family car’s tyres. Mum and Dad cannot cope with Gibby, so they try to find her a hotel room. Jim returns to the Goodman house. Mum and Dad leave the house in Adam’s car to escape Gibby for a few nights. After the boys concede that they will have to look after her, she tries to seduce Jim. However, when she takes off her scarf and cardigan, he is scared by the wolf on her shirt and runs home screaming.
35	4	"Dad’s Birthday"	Martin Dennis	Robert Popper	17 April 2020	4.55
Jonny arrives in his car as Adam arrives after running and is sweating. They enter the house and give Dad presents, but he is unhappy. He is disappointed after reading an article on the news says that people will be able to go to Mars in 2050. He realises that he is unlikely to live until then and tells Mum and the boys when – according to a website's calculations – they will die. Jim visits and fails in his attempt to perform magic. They intend to leave, but Horrible Grandma arrives unexpectedly so they stay in the house. She deliberately throws red wine on the chairs and walls, then insults them all – so they make it clear that they hate her. She tells them that she is staying at the house to make them unhappy. Jim visits again and annoys them with more magic attempts; his last trick is to make her disappear. Like all the other tricks, it does not work – but she dies suddenly. Dad briefly cries, then laughs loudly. Last appearance of Horrible Grandma
36	5	"The Cage"	Martin Dennis	Robert Popper	24 April 2020	4.66
The boys arrive at home, only to discover Val on her own – Mum has had a "women's procedure" at hospital, so Val will be cooking instead. However, even as Mum and Dad arrive back home, Val is distracted as she has arranged a Tinder date with Colin aka LoverBoy309 – whom she has stalked for months – that evening at the Goodmans. As a result, the family eat their food quickly, even when the date is apparently cancelled. Everyone is soon distracted with the arrival of a dog cage made out of extra-strong, galvanized steel, Jim having had it posted to the Goodmans and then set up in their living room as so to avoid attracting Milson's attention. Val becomes upset at the date being cancelled and her previous breakup from Larry, as she serves the family her notoriously disgusting rice pudding. Because everyone hates it, they trick Jim into eating all of it under the guise of it being a high honour for a gentile to eat 'Jewish rice pudding'. Jim eats all four bowls, vomits out the window and leaves the house. Colin changes his mind and comes to the house, sending Val into a frenzy at the expense of a sore Mum – resulting in Adam and Jonny, after playing pranks on each other with their phones using Dad's new duct tape, taping Val's phone to the inside of the dog cage. Mum locks Val in as a joke, but accidentally pulls the handle off just before Colin arrives. The Goodmans decide to leave Val and Colin to talk as they get some ice cream, only for Jim to arrive to collect the cage – which he tells them is for him. He walks into the house, unaware of Val and Colin's presence. Last appearance of Val
37	6	"The Females"	Martin Dennis	Robert Popper	1 May 2020	4.54
Arriving at home with their new girlfriends, both called Lucy, an anxious Adam and Jonny go into the house whilst the Lucys are in the car in order to lay some ground rules for their parents regarding how to behave that evening. Dad tells the boys that he accidentally dropped glass shards into the chicken soup and to not tell Mum. The boys quickly tell the girls; the Lucys and Dad distract Mum to stop her drinking the soup. She is annoyed and thinks that the Lucys dislike her cooking. Next, a horrified Dad discovers glass is also in the roast chicken. The Lucys, not wanting Mum to think her food is awful, tell her about the glass. They are about to eat the crumble, only for Dad to accidentally smash a glass over it; seeing Mum lose the last of her patience, the girls both reveal they are pregnant in an attempt to defuse the situation. Adam is pleased that he will become a father, but Jonny is shocked at his fatherhood. Mum is delighted at becoming a grandmother; Dad is pleased to a lesser extent. Within all of this, Jim pays visits with Milson who vomits onto the Goodmans' drive and then down the side of the house. He later tells them that Milson has given birth to seven puppies, which he shows them. After Adam and Jonny talk about how they both now need to grow up now that they are expectant fathers, Mum gets everyone to take part in a boogie celebration, which Jim joins. Dad picks up the radio, then drops and breaks it. A tribute to Frances Cuka, who played Grandma, is in the end credits. Last appearances of Jackie, Martin, Adam, Jonny, Milson & Jim.

== Home media ==
Series	Episodes	Release date	Box-Set releases
Series	Episodes	Region 2	
1	6	31 May 2013	—N/a
2	6 (+1 special)	31 December 2013	Series 1–2
3	6	23 November 2015	Series 1–3
4	6	5 September 2016	—N/a
5	6	16 July 2018	Series 1–5
6	6	18 May 2020	Series 1–6
