= Daniel Thrasher =

American internet personality (born 1993)

- Thrasher in 2024

Background information
- Born: Daniel Cole Thrasher; February 24, 1993 (age 33); Roanoke, Virginia, U.S.
- Occupations: YouTuber; actor; comedian; filmmaker; multi-instrumentalist
- Instruments: Vocals; piano; guitar; ukulele; bagpipes; theremin; sousaphone
- Years active: 2007–present

Twitch information
- Channel: thrasherplus
- Years active: 2022–present
- Followers: 20.7 thousand

YouTube information
- Channels: Daniel Thrasher; Daniel Thrasher Plus
- Genres: Music; sketch comedy; Let's Play; vlogs
- Subscribers: 6 million (main channel); 6.89 million (combined) (Note: Subscribers, broken down by channel: 6 million (Daniel Thrasher) 896 thousand (Daniel Thrasher Plus))
- Views: 2.6 billion (main channel); 2.79 billion (combined) (Note: Views, broken down by channel: 2.6 billion (Daniel Thrasher) 193 million (Daniel Thrasher Plus))
- Last updated: November 11, 2026

Daniel Cole Thrasher (born February 24, 1993) is an American YouTuber, actor, comedian, filmmaker, and multi-instrumentalist. He is known for writing, directing, and starring in his piano-based sketch comedy videos to his self-titled YouTube channel (@danielthrasher). As of November 2026, his main YouTube channel has accumulated more than 2.6 billion views with more than 6 million subscribers.

== Personal life ==
Daniel Cole Thrasher was born on February 24, 1993 in Roanoke, Virginia, United States. He is the youngest of four children, having an older brother and two older sisters.

== Career ==
Thrasher went to Pinellas County Center for the Arts, a magnet school.

Thrasher created his main YouTube channel, then titled muffinman3000, on January 5, 2007, with the first video being uploaded on December 1, 2011.

On November 13, 2012, Thrasher uploaded a video titled "How I Accidentally Wrote The Office Theme Song," in which he explains how, after he got a new piano, he was testing a chord progression that sounded familiar, before he realized it was the theme song of The Office. A few years later, when Thrasher was in college, the video went viral, and as of April 2024 has over 22 million views and is the fourth most-viewed video on his channel.

In 2015, Thrasher graduated from Savannah College of Art and Design with Bachelor of Fine Arts in Performing Arts.

In 2019, Thrasher quit his job as a barista to pursue YouTube as a full-time career. By that point, he had accrued over one million subscribers. During the COVID-19 lockdowns, Thrasher continued to post videos. As a result, he almost tripled his amount of subscribers. He was able to increase the size of his operation to a four-person team.

In 2021, American comedy duo Rhett & Link of Good Mythical Morning announced that a fund called the Mythical Creator Accelerator was created to invest over $5 million into creators, through their production company Mythical Entertainment. Thrasher was the second beneficiary of the fund in April 2022.

On December 1, 2021, Thrasher performed a one-day show at the Palace Theatre in Los Angeles, entitled Daniel Thrasher: Laugh or Die. He also embarked on a five-show tour in August 2022, entitled Daniel Thrasher Live, traveling to three states across the Midwest. In October of the same year, he received a nomination for the Craft Award for Writing at the 12th Streamy Awards.

Thrasher attended as a featured creator at VidCon in June 2023; in May of the same year, it was revealed that he was set to feature in the US remake of British television sitcom Friday Night Dinner, titled Dinner with the Parents, which premiered on Amazon Freevee on April 18, 2024.

== Awards and nominations ==
Year	Organization	Award	Result
2022	Streamy Awards	Writing	Nominated

== Discography ==
=== Solo albums ===
- Quick and Sketchy (2019)

=== Singles ===
- "Once Upon a Paradise" (2018)
- "The After" (2021)
- "When You Make a Musical Promise" (2022)
- "I Play Piano Too" (2022)
- "Shiny Object Syndrome" (2022)
- "Igowallah" (2023)
- "The Wiener Song" (2023)
- "Leinad's Waltz" (2024)
- "Need to Calm Down" (2025)
- "Stay Up" (2025)

== Filmography ==
=== Film ===
Year	Title	Role	Notes
2018	Song of Back and Neck	Alex	

=== Television ===
Year	Title	Role	Notes
2016	The Millionaires	Daniel	4 episodes
2024	Dinner with the Parents	Gregg Langer	Main
2026	Scrubs (2026 TV series)	Dustin	

=== Web ===
Year	Title	Role	Notes
2022	God of Work	Chris	6 episodes
