= The Night Larry Kramer Kissed Me =

Semi-autobiographical, one-man show, written by David Drake

The Night Larry Kramer Kissed Me is a semi-autobiographical, one-man show, written by Obie-winning actor and playwright David Drake. Broken up into a series of stories, Drake abstractly documents a gay man's journey of self-discovery, while also addressing the AIDS crisis that plagued the community in the 1980s.

== Characters ==
Not only is The Night Larry Kramer Kissed Me a one-man show, but it also appears to follow the journey of just one character. Despite its autobiographical nature, this nameless character is referred to only as "performer" in the script.

The performer is portrayed at many different stages in life, from childhood, to adolescence, to adulthood, and travels through his personal timeline, from past, to present, to future. Many other characters from the performer's life are mentioned, and sometimes briefly mimicked, but only as they relate to the stories of the performer.

== Summary ==
=== The Birthday Triptych ===
==== "Somewhere…" ====
In Part One of The Birthday Triptych, the performer recounts his first experience with the theater on the night of his sixth birthday, the same night of The Stonewall Riots, June 27, 1969. He recalls sitting on the edge of his seat during a community theater performance of West Side Story, rapt by the excitement unfolding before him.

==== "Out There in the Night" ====
In this story's second chapter, the performer describes his 16th birthday, attending a downtown Baltimore performance of A Chorus Line with another boy, Tim. He alternates from describing his admiration for Tim and his admiration for the show, eventually recounting the car ride home, during which he cries as he explains to Tim that he is like "that Puerto Rican boy in the show". After coming out to Tim, they kiss, but are caught by the performer's parents. Part Two ends with parental accusations of whether or not the performer's sexuality is a phase, as he eventually concludes that New York is the only place for people like him.

==== "The Night Larry Kramer Kissed Me" ====
The triptych ends with a retelling of the performer's 22nd birthday. On June 27, 1985, he attends a performance of The Normal Heart, the autobiographical play by activist and playwright Larry Kramer. The performer explains that the kiss he intended to witness, the performed, on stage kiss, was not the "kiss" he walked away with. Instead, this "kiss" was the igniting of a passion and anger that was ever-present during the AIDS crisis of the time. He recalls this "kiss" as the motivation of his in-the-streets activism, his finally joining the fight against AIDS, and against the world that was not addressing it themselves.

=== Owed to the Village People, Part One ===
This story begins with the performer portraying his 8-year-old self, praying at the foot of his bed. He begins addressing God formally, but eventually, after checking that his parents have gone to bed, moves about the space and addresses God in a formal manner. He sets off on a tangent, first about the paperweight he has bought his father for Christmas, then about catching lightning bugs with a friend, Janis, and playing with her Barbie Dream House, only to be interrupted by her bully older brother, Brad. Eventually, after more tangentializing about butterfly hunting, he describes shopping for his mother's gift, a Village People record which he chose for his mother's love of music after hearing it while getting a haircut. He then begins to question the masculinity of the men in the Village People in response Janis saying that Brad called them "fairies", and that he would know, because he's in a band. The performer is confused by this - he thinks they look tough and manly. He postulates that the Village People met at a community pool or the YMCA before starting a band, and fantasizes about being "big and tough like the Village People" and dominating his bullies. The scene ends with the performing picking up the aforementioned paperweight, and ragefully screaming at it the word "fairy".

=== Why I Go to the Gym ===
In Why I Go to the Gym, the performer moves about the features of a gym - a locker room, and various workout stations. He carries with him a pole that serves as various parts of various gym features. Through his exploration of this space, he chronicles his experience at the gym as a gay man. It's often sexually charged, critiquing the ever-looming masculinity through interactions with other men, both straight and gay. Soon, it transforms into a self-critical chant, as the performer exercises while enforcing the importance of gaining muscle and endurance. Soon, the cadence of his speech begins to resemble that of a military drill, and his words become aggressive, visualizing the war against homosexual people as violent and immediately threatening. By the end of the piece, he's carrying the pole like a rifle over one shoulder.

=== 12" Single ===
This story begins with the performer preparing for a night out in front of a full-length mirror. Like in Why I Go to the Gym, most dialogue is an internal narration of the character's actions and thoughts. It is also set to a recorded composition, and has roots in rap, though is not a musical number. In this piece, the performer explores the strict, intricate structure of being a gay man on the dating scene. Most of it takes place in a bar, where the character is searching for a potential partner, relishing in the music and the surrounding gay men. As he browses, he labels each man methodically, calling them by descriptive nicknames such as "Upbeat & Positive", "Cute & Cuddly", and "Gladiator Guppie". He goes on to describe them in detail, as if on a dating profile, first starting with an acronym, either GWM (gay white male) or GBM (gay black male), then moving on to their age, height, and weight. He further describes other details like color of their hair, their body type, and lastly, what they are looking for. Each man is not only a very specific type, but also seeks another, very specific type. Though the piece begins as lighthearted and vibrant, after the performer snorts drugs it quickly escalates to an aggressive, slurred-filled tirade, directed at a soldier in the back of the audience. Towards the end, the slurs become violent and the performer pulls a hunting knife out of his pocket, according to the stage directions not as a weapon necessarily, "but rather as an abstract symbol of violence".

=== Owed to the Village People, Part Two ===
Less than a page long, Owed to the Village People, Part Two takes the form of a prayer. It begins with the traditional prayer of "Now I Lay me Down to Sleep…", and continues with the performer blessing his parents, family, and pets. However, this time, he ends with the words, "And God? Bless the Village People."

=== A Thousand Points of Light ===
This piece serves as a remembrance of all those taken by AIDS. It is set at a candlelight vigil on a New York City street, and begins with the performer lighting a candle, which he carries throughout the rest of the piece. He begins to recall the names of those passed, asking "where did you go?".

First, he remembers his old neighbor, Gary, who used to bring him old belongings: a leather baseball cap, a beach towel, a picnic basket, a box of Gordon Merrick paperbacks, and many, many, tapes. The performer describes visiting Gary at the hospital to deliver his mail and meeting his lover, Harlow. He then recalls the nights following Gary's return home, when he'd press his ear to the wall to hear Gary singing along to his records before going to sleep. One night, Harlow knocked on his door, offering up Gary's old shoes, and then inviting the performer out to eat. Upon returning, they discover that Gary has passed away. The performer then describes Harlow's sickness, and death that soon follows.

Next, he remembers Paul, an ex-lover who feared commitment, but constantly called from motel rooms while on tour. Soon, Paul disappeared for two months, and only saw the performer again after a phone call made by Paul's sister. The performer describes his anger with Paul, his frustration with his actions, and then Paul's passing as he sat with him. He concludes Paul's story with the week spent with his family during the funeral, who argued over whether the speaker was Paul's friend or lover.

Will, an ACT UP activist is remembered next. The performer recalls Will introducing him to the movement after coincidentally meeting him at a bank machine. He introduces him to their passionate world of stickers and slogans and sit-ins and activism, and then eventually takes him home for the night. The performer mentions a seemingly magical performance by drag queen Ethyl Eichelberger, and the intimate night that followed. He concludes with demanding to know where Will left to, and where he is now.

The performer's questions escalate as he fails to make sense of the tragedy surrounding him. He suddenly locates a star, which he speaks of as a guiding light. He eventually answers his original questions, saying, "I know where you went. We're all here in the night."

The performer proceeds to extend his honor to every person taken by AIDS, not just the ones he once knew. He extends his light, and his love, ending the piece with a literal moment of silence for all of the lost stars.

=== "... and The Way We Were" ===
The conclusion of the play is set in the future - New Year's Eve, 1999, 10 minutes before midnight. It serves as a beacon of hope for what the world might look like if the activism encouraged throughout the play is successful, including possible cultural references of a future in which homosexuality is more widely recognized and respected. The performer's line in this scene are addressed to either his lover, offstage, or the audience, in a casual breaking of the fourth wall. The performer and his lover have just returned from a new remake of The Way We Were, starring Tom Cruise and Jason Streisand, and directed by "Barbra" (presumably Barbra Streisand).

He goes on to mention that this night marks the one-year anniversary of his Domestic Partnership with his lover, who he calls "Button". He then goes on to recall a period of militant gay activism, including a ‘96 Pentagon Action, a Together We'll Take Manhattan Action, the Queer War of ‘96, which concludes with the assassination of Rush Limbaugh. He also mentions the imprisonments of AIDS researcher Robert Gallo, antifeminist Phyllis Schafly, and conservative congressman William Dannemeyer, in addition to Ed Koch and Anthony Fauci's South American exile. He moves onto mention a new National Holiday, and the production of a Queer Cultures Wing on the Smithsonian.

The performer continues to reminisce, but then fantasizes about the future, punctuating each hope with "you'll see". He promises the legal success of Joseph Steffan in his suit against the Annapolis Naval Academy. He swears that the new Census Report will have a "Sexual Orientation" column, and that the results will be higher than Alfred Kinsey's estimate of 10%. He continues to predict that movie and television stars will begin to come out of the closet, or else be replaced by homosexual people.

The story, and play, ends with a simple fantasy - the freedom of people like the performer to walk hand in hand with their lovers on the street of any American city "without condemnation, restrictions, compromises, or closets", but instead a freedom to love.

== Historical Context ==
Throughout American history, aggression and discrimination against the LGBT community has taken many forms. In the 1950s, it took the form of The Lavender Scare, a firing and distrust of homosexual people who worked for the U.S. government. Paralleling MCarthyism, a persecution of communists and communist sympathizers, gay and lesbian people were deemed security risks because they supposedly were targets of blackmail because society forced them to lead closeted lives. With this precedent, the climate in America toward the gay community remained hostile. Still, homosexual people - gay men in particular - started demanding rights, and began to gain them in cities such as San Francisco and New York. They flocked to these cities, loving openly and living as they chose (http://hab.hrsa.gov/livinghistory/issues/gaymen_1.htm). In the midst of this, the gay and lesbian population of America was struck with tragedy - the AIDS virus, which became an epidemic in the 1980s.

Though very real and pressing within the gay community, the US Government's response to the crisis was underwhelming. President Ronald Reagan failed to address the issue until six years after the first case of AIDS was identified, though the rapid spread of the virus made it clear that the homosexual population was in crisis.

Many people soon became enraged by this lack of attention to a virus killing thousands of Americans. Activists and politicians called out the clear homophobia in ignoring AIDS. Writing in The Washington Post in late 1985, Rep. Henry Waxman, D-Los Angeles, stated: "It is surprising that the president could remain silent as 6,000 Americans died, that he could fail to acknowledge the epidemic's existence. Perhaps his staff felt he had to, since many of his New Right supporters have raised money by campaigning against homosexuals."

With too-little action from the government, the work was left to grassroots activists in major cities where AIDS was rampant. One of the major AIDS activist groups was ACT UP (The AIDS Coalition to Unleash Power), founded in 1987, after an impassioned speech by playwright and activist Larry Kramer, demanding political action to fight AIDS.

The group was controversial, but effective at drawing attention to the epidemic. In Michelangelo Signorille's foreword to The Night Larry Kramer Kissed Me, he theorizes that "perhaps ACT UP's greatest impact was its most subtle," as "a sort of finishing school for [those] who, through magazines, books, films, arts and theater, would take its powerful message far and wide in the years to come." He explains how, "like Tony Kushner with his Broadway hit Angels in America, and like Kramer himself with his 1992 critically acclaimed play The Destiny of Me, David Drake is one of those who took that message to the stage."

Using the anger and frustration that dominated this movement, and the first passionate moments of activism after seeing Larry Kramer's The Normal Heart, David Drake wrote his own piece of theatrical activism, The Night Larry Kramer Kissed Me.

== Performances ==
=== Debut ===
David Drake starred in his play's 1992 debut, which opened just a few days before Drake's birthday and the anniversary of the Stonewall riots. It closed the night of the anniversaries in 1993. According to Thomas Long, in his book AIDS and American Apocalypticism, this timing was part of Drake's concern with constructing "a myth of origins: Stonewall as the birth of ‘modern' gay activism; a production of West Side Story by queer composer Berstein as the consecratory moment of Drake's queerness, etc.

The play premiered at New York's Perry Street Theater, and played for a full year off-Broadway, making it one of the longest running solo shows in New York.

=== Additional performances ===
The Night Larry Kramer Kissed Me has been performed independently nearly 100 times worldwide, in the US, England, South Africa, Australia, Argentina, Brazil, France, New Zealand, and has also been translated into Greek, Spanish, Portuguese, and French

In 1995, The New Heights Theatre in Houston, TX opened with a production of The Night Larry Kramer Kissed Me. It starred Joe Kirkendall, was directed by Ron Jones with choreography by Jim Williams.

On May 20, 2013, The Night Larry Kramer Kissed Me returned to New York as a benefit for Broadway Cares/Equity Fights AIDS and Sero Project, in celebration of the play's 20th anniversary. Taking place at John Jay college, this re-imagination directed by Robert La Fosse utilized an ensemble of actors rather than just one. After raising over $66,000, Tom Viola, executive director of Broadway Cares/Equity Fights AIDS, remarked that "the 20th anniversary performance was a moving, exhilarating success."

In 2026 the production was revived in the UK, starring Gabriel Clark. The production was nominated for Best Solo Performance and Best Director at the Fringe Theatre Awards. The production was celebrated as "an extraordinary solo performance" with reviewers noting an "outstanding performance from Gabriel Clark." Alongside the show Clark interviewed various activists and prominent LGBT+ figures, including activists from ACT UP New York, Russell T Davies, ACTUP Manchester, and Dan Glass from ACT UP London.

=== Film adaptation ===
In 2000, The Night Larry Kramer Kissed Me was adapted into a film by David Drake himself. Drake also starred in this version, directed by Tim Kirkman.

This film received praise from multiple publications, including The New York Times's Lawrence Van Gelder calling Drake "rivetingly angry, intense, frenetic, frank and touching" and the Village Voice's Jessica Winter praising his "impossible balance between mordant wit and articulate bewilderment".

== Awards ==
David Drake won several awards for his writing and performance of The Night Larry Kramer Kissed Me, including an Obie Award for performance in 1993, and two Dramalogue Awards in the same year. He was also nominated for a Lambda Literary Award the following year.
