= David Drake (actor) =

American playwright, stage director, actor and author

- Born: David Drakula; June 27, 1963 (age 63); Edgewood, Maryland, U.S.
- Occupations: Playwright, stage director, actor, author
- Writing career
- Notable work: The Night Larry Kramer Kissed Me
- Notable awards: Village Voice Obie Award, Drama-Logue Award for "Outstanding Solo Performance", Robbie Stevens Frontiers Magazine Award for "Outstanding Solo Performance"

David Drake (born June 27, 1963) is an American playwright, stage director, actor and author. He is best known as the author and original performer of The Night Larry Kramer Kissed Me, for which he received a Village Voice Obie Award, a 1994 Drama-Logue Award for "Outstanding Solo Performance," and a Robbie Stevens Frontiers Magazine Award for the same. Nominations include a 1994 LA Weekly Theater Award and a Lambda Literary Award nomination for "Best New Play of 1994" (published by Anchor Books).

== Biography ==
Born as David Drakula in Edgewood, Maryland, and raised in Baltimore, he later began going by the name David Drake. He has Romanian roots. Drake has contributed articles to the Advocate, TheaterWeek, and Details. One of the longest one-actor plays in Off Broadway history, Larry Kramer has received over thirty productions in nearly a dozen countries, and the published version was nominated for a Lambda Literary Award.

In 2000 Drake starred in a movie version of The Night Larry Kramer Kissed Me. The movie was directed by Tim Kirkman and was filmed at Baltimore Theatre Project.

David Drake has appeared in the feature film Philadelphia and on the stage in Vampire Lesbians of Sodom, Pageant, The Boys in the Band, and A Language of Their Own.

He now lives in Provincetown, MA, where he is artistic director of The Provincetown Theater.

== Credits ==
=== Print ===
- The Night Larry Kramer Kissed Me, New York : Anchor Books, 1994, 112 pages, ISBN 0-385-47204-8

=== Stage ===
- Pageant
- Vampire Lesbians of Sodom
- The Night Larry Kramer Kissed Me, Summer 1992
- Son of Drakula

As a director, David has directed Eric Bernat's Starstruck, That Woman: Rebecca West Remember, starring Anne Bobby, and The Be(a)st of Taylor Mac, written and performed by Taylor Mac, which won a Herald Angel Award, A Latest Award, and an Argus Angel Award. In May 2009, his production of James Edwin Parker's 2 Boys in a Bed on a Cold Winter's Night played to sold-out houses and rave reviews as part of the Dublin Gay Theatre Festival. He is currently working on directing Songs My Mother Never Taught Me, written and performed by Deborah Karpel, which premiered at the Ruhrfestspiele in Recklinghausen, Germany, in June 2009.

In July 2009 he participated in the Sundance Institute Theatre Lab, workshopping Taylor Mac's five-act musical Lily's Revenge. This was his second trip to Sundance, having directed the workshop of Edmund White's Terre Haute in 2005.

He is a frequent collaborator of New York producer Paul Lucas, for whom he has directed that Woman, The Be(a)st of Taylor Mac, Stand Up/Lie Down, and Songs My Mother Never Taught Me.

He is currently the artistic director of the Provincetown Theater.

=== Film ===
Genre	Year	Title	Role	Episodes	Notes
Film	1989	Longtime Companion	GMHC Volunteer		
TV series	1992	Law & Order	Voorman	"Star Struck"	3 episodes total
Film	1993	Naked in New York	Waiter		
TV series	1993	Bob	Patrick	"Whose Card Is It Anyway?"	
TV film	1993	Out There	Himself		
Film	1993	Philadelphia	Bruno		
Film	1994	It's Pat	Gunther		
TV series	1995	New York Undercover	Mizek Rezami	"Young, Beautiful and Dead"	
Short film	1996	Cater-Waiter	Gary		14 minutes
Film	1997	David Searching	Mark		
Film	1997	Peoria Babylon	Jon Ashe		
Short film	1998	Black Olung	The Tea Lover		10 minutes
Short film	1998	Tree Shade	Santa Claus		30 minutes
Short film	1999	15 Minutes	The Artist		25 minutes
Film	1999	Hit and Runway	Michael		
Short film	1999	The Trey Billings Show	Trey Billings / Dodie Day		30 minutes; writer; actor
Film	2000	The Night Larry Kramer Kissed Me			writer; actor filmed in 1999, also on DVD and video, 2002
Short film	2001	Cruise Control	Gary		7 minutes
Short film	2001	Jeffrey's Hollywood Screen Trick	Voice of Gay Men		voice actor; 11 minutes
TV series	2001	Law & Order	Mr. Aldrich	"Soldier of Fortune"	3 episodes total
TV series	2003	Law & Order: Criminal Intent	Jason	"Suite Sorrow"	
Film	2007	Night Falls Fast	Guy		
TV series	2008	Law & Order	Herbert Wiggins	"Bottomless"	3 episodes total
Film	2008	We Pedal Uphill	Andy		
Film	2010	BearCity	Dr. Straube		
TV series	2012	The Good Wife	Jacques	"Blue Ribbon Panel" "Pants on Fire"	
Film	2017	After Louie	William Wilson		

== See also ==
- Charles Busch
