= Michaela Watkins =

American actress (born 1971)

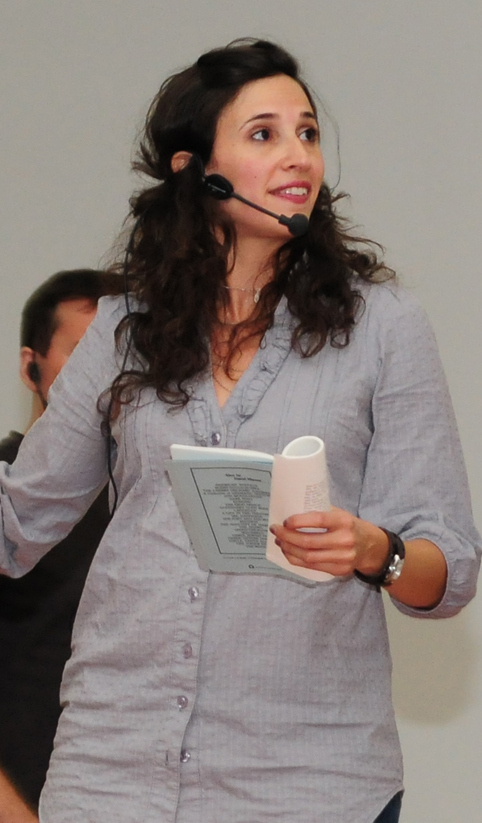
- Watkins in January 2010
- Born: December 14, 1971 (age 54); Syracuse, New York, U.S.
- Education: Boston University (BFA)
- Occupations: Actress, comedian
- Years active: 1998–present
- Known for: Saturday Night Live; Trophy Wife; Casual; The Unicorn
- Spouse: Fred Kramer (m. 2013)

Michaela Watkins (born December 14, 1971) is an American actress and comedian. After several years performing with the Los Angeles comedy troupe The Groundlings, Watkins achieved widespread attention for her brief stint as a featured player on the NBC sketch comedy series Saturday Night Live during its 34th season between 2008 and 2009. Since leaving SNL, she has starred on the Hulu series Casual and on the short-lived sitcoms The Unicorn and Trophy Wife. Watkins has also had recurring and supporting roles on television series such as The New Adventures of Old Christine, Catastrophe, Enlightened, Search Party, The Dropout, and Hacks. She has appeared in films such as The Back-up Plan (2010), Wanderlust (2012), Enough Said (2013), Sword of Trust (2019), and Suze (2023).

== Early life ==
Watkins was born in 1971 in Syracuse, New York, the daughter of former Latin teacher mother Myrna Watkins and Syracuse University mathematician father Mark Watkins. She has two sisters, Rebecca Kent and Sarah Fitts.

Watkins was raised in DeWitt, New York, a suburb of Syracuse, in a Jewish family. After her parents' divorce, Watkins' mother obtained a marketing degree and relocated the family to Boston when Watkins was 15.

Watkins attended Moses DeWitt Elementary School in DeWitt and Wellesley High School in Wellesley, Massachusetts. She graduated from Boston University, where she studied theater and acting. Watkins auditioned for a part in a British farce at a community theater when she was 15, and got the part. Joan Rivers was one of her inspirations to go into show business.

== Career ==
=== Theater ===
After theater school, Watkins lived and worked in New York City for a year but struggled to build her career. She moved with a friend to Portland, Oregon. She lived there from 1996 to 2000 and appeared onstage with Portland Center Stage and the defunct improv group Toad City Productions. She traveled around the country doing regional theater, then decided to move to Los Angeles.

She was active in Los Angeles Theatre for many years, taking on roles with Circle X Theatre and 2100 Square Feet.

==== Regional theater ====
- Portland Center Stage: Hamlet (1999), Rosencrantz & Guildenstern are Dead (1999), Bus Stop (2000)
- Portland Repertory Theatre: Arcadia
- Artist Repertory Theatre: The Misanthrope, How I Learned To Drive as well as Merchant of Venice, The Winter's Tale
- triangle productions: Angels in America, The Food Chain
- Circle X Theatre: Laura Comstock's Bag Punching Dog (2002) – LA Weekly award, Sperm (2004)
- Vineyard Playhouse: Fighting Words by Sunil Kuruvilla (2003)

=== Improv ===
She became a regular performer at The Groundlings, where she was discovered by Saturday Night Live. Watkins said the appeal of sketch work is that she can write her own material.

=== Television ===
==== Saturday Night Live ====
In November 2008, Watkins joined the cast of Saturday Night Live (SNL). Watkins said (at that time) that she was the oldest woman they ever hired. Watkins has since been surpassed by Leslie Jones, who was 47 when she joined SNL. Watkins made her first major appearance on the show as Arianna Huffington on the November 22nd Weekend Update. Watkins remained on SNL as a featured player throughout the rest of the 2008–2009 season, up to the season finale on May 16, 2009.

However, while SNL was on summer hiatus, the news broke in early September 2009 that Watkins, along with fellow castmate Casey Wilson, were both to be let go from the show and would not be returning for the 2009–10 season.

===== Recurring character on SNL =====
- Angie Tempura: A geeky, iced coffee-drinking computer nerd who snarks on celebrities and movies and is the creator of the snarky website "Bitch Pleeze" (www.bitchpleeze.com, which redirects to the SNL site). Though she insults celebrities, Angie was revealed to have a crush on Zac Efron.

==== Later TV credits ====
She recurred as Lucy opposite Julia Louis-Dreyfus and Hamish Linklater in the sitcom The New Adventures of Old Christine, as well as appearing in recurring roles in the comedy programs Enlightened, New Girl, and Anger Management. She has also made guest appearances on shows such as Hung, Childrens Hospital, Kroll Show, Key & Peele, Curb Your Enthusiasm, and Modern Family.

Watkins also starred alongside Malin Åkerman, Bradley Whitford, and Marcia Gay Harden in the short-lived, but well-received ABC sitcom Trophy Wife. The series aired for one season from September 2013 to May 2014.

In 2015, it was announced that Watkins would star in the Hulu series produced by Jason Reitman called Casual, which would be executive produced by Liz Tigelaar.

In 2018, she recurred on season two of the Amazon Prime series Catastrophe, playing the sister of lead character Rob Norris (Rob Delaney). From 2019 to 2021, she has co-starred on the CBS sitcom The Unicorn.

In June 2026, she joins the Amazon Prime series, The Probability of Miracles, as Elaine.

==== Producing, writing ====
Watkins co-created (with writing partner and fellow Groundling, Damon Jones) the short-lived 2014 USA Network comedy series Benched. The series starred Eliza Coupe and Jay Harrington and premiered on October 28, 2014. Watkins and Jones were also executive producers on the show.

=== Film ===
Watkins has appeared in supporting roles in films such as Enough Said, In a World..., Afternoon Delight, The Back-Up Plan, Wanderlust, They Came Together and Lazy Eye.

In 2023, Watkins starred in Suze.

=== Podcasts ===
In 2020, Watkins appeared in the supporting role of Irene O'Connor in the musical podcast In Strange Woods.

== Personal life ==
Watkins is married to Fred Kramer, who is a founding partner of Reason Ventures and General Manager of Critical Mass Studios, Inc. Kramer used to be Executive Director of the Jewish World Watch organization, a Los Angeles-based anti-genocide non-profit, focused on the situations in Sudan and Congo.

== Filmography ==
=== Film ===
Year	Film	Role	Notes
1998	Inconceivable	Marcy	
2008	Yoga Matt	Jill Goering	Short film
2010	The Back-up Plan	Mona	
2010	The Prankster	Miss LaFleur	
2010	Welcome to the Jungle Gym	Principal Gilly	Short film
2010	Worst Enemy	Wooly	Short film
2011	Una Hora Por Favora	Elissa	Short film
2012	Wanderlust	Marisa Gergenblatt	
2012	Thanks for Sharing	Marney	
2013	In a World...	Dani	
2013	Afternoon Delight	Jennie	
2013	iSteve	Melinda Gates	
2013	Bunion	Therapist	Short film
2013	Enough Said	Hillary	
2014	They Came Together	Habermeyer	
2016	Donald Trump's The Art of the Deal: The Movie	Ivana Trump	
2016	Punching Henry	Mara	
2016	Lazy Eye	Mel	
2017	Person to Person	The Widow	
2017	Brigsby Bear	Louise Pope	
2017	The House of Tomorrow	Mrs. Whitcomb	
2017	How to Be a Latin Lover	Gwen	
2017	The House	Raina Theodorakis	
2018	Dude	Jill	
2018	Ibiza	Sarah	
2018	Under the Eiffel Tower	Tillie	
2018	Antiquities	Dolores Jr.	
2019	Brittany Runs a Marathon	Catherine	
2019	Sword of Trust	Mary	
2019	Good Boys	Saleswoman	
2019	Modern/Love in 7 Short Films	Jane	
2020	The Way Back	Beth	
2020	Bad Therapy	Judy Small	
2020	For Madmen Only: The Stories of Del Close	Narrator	
2021	Werewolves Within	Trisha Anderton	
2023	You Hurt My Feelings	Sarah	
2023	The Young Wife	Lara	
2023	Paint	Katherine	
2023	Suze	Suze	
2024	The American Society of Magical Negroes	Masterson	
2025	Heart Eyes	Crystal Cane	

=== Television ===
Year	Title	Role	Notes
2001	Charmed	Andrea	Episode: "Death Takes A Halliwell"
2003	Without a Trace	Marla	Episode: "Maple Street"
2003	Miss Match	Susan Scott	Episode: "Divorce Happens"
2004	Strong Medicine	Julia	Episode: "Bleeding Heart"
2006	Medium	Clerk	2 episodes
2006	Modern Men	Amanda	Episode: "Pilot"
2006	Grey's Anatomy	Nikki Ratlin	Episode: "Superstition"
2006	Malcolm in the Middle	Receptionist	Episode: "Hal's Dentist"
2006	7 Deadly Hollywood Sins	Jennifer	4 episodes
2007	Revenge	Mary-Louise	Unsold TV pilot
2008	Man Stroke Woman (American version)	Various	Unsold TV pilot
2008	Frank TV	Julia Roberts	Episode: "#2.1"
2008	Californication	Executive	2 episodes
2008–09	Saturday Night Live	Various	15 episodes
2008–09	The New Adventures of Old Christine	Lucy	7 episodes
2009	Eli Stone	Judge Leigh Rappaport	Episode: "Sonoma"
2010	Parenthood	Lucy Estman	Episode: "Team Braverman"
2010	Miami Medical	Carla	Episode: "Time of Death"
2011	Mad	Samus Aran / Sam Puckett / Mom (voice)	Episode: "The Straight A-Team/Gaming's Next Top Princess"
2011	Curb Your Enthusiasm	Saundra	Episode: "The Safe House"
2011	Hung	Judy	Episode: "Don't Give Up on Detroit or Hung Like a Horse"
2011	Private Practice	Laura Martin	Episode: "Deal with It"
2011–13	Enlightened	Janice Holm	9 episodes
2011–15	New Girl	Gina	5 episodes
2012	The Life & Times of Tim	Homeless Woman (voice)	Episode: "Pudding Boy/The Celebrity Who Shall Remain Nameless"
2012	Bent	Carol	Episode: "HD"
2012	Childrens Hospital	Detective Lacey Briggs	Episode: "The Return of the Young Billionaire"
2012	Key & Peele	Mary Magdalene	2 episodes
2012	Modern Family	Susan	Episode: "Schooled"
2012–22	Robot Chicken	Nerd's Mom / various (voice)	8 episodes
2013	NTSF:SD:SUV::	Beth	Episode: "Extra Terrorist-rial"
2013	Comedy Bang! Bang!	Amber	Episode: "Gillian Jacobs Wears a Red Dress with Sail Boats"
2013	Anger Management	Lisa	2 episodes
2013–14	Trophy Wife	Jackie Fisher	22 episodes
2013–14	Kroll Show	Various	2 episodes
2014–15	Married	Stacey	2 episodes
2014–16	Drunk History	Nurse / Julia Child	2 episodes
2014–19	Transparent	Connie / Yetta	6 episodes
2015	Marry Me	Janet L'Amour	Episode: "Dead Me"
2015	The Goldbergs	Señora Taraborelli	2 episodes
2015	Veep	Patti	Episode: "East Wing"
2015	The Comedians	Wendy Myers	Episode: "Partners"
2015	Wet Hot American Summer: First Day of Camp	Rhonda	6 episodes
2015–18	Casual	Valerie Meyers	36 episodes
2016	Pickle and Peanut	Pickle's Mom / various (voice)	Episode: "What Lies Beneath/The Rat King Moves In"
2016	Another Period	Brothel Madam	Episode: "Joplin"
2016–17	Angie Tribeca	Melanie Burke	2 episodes
2016–21	American Dad!	Various voices	5 episodes
2016–21	Family Guy	Girl Pulling Train (voice)	2 episodes
2017	Speechless	Becca	Episode: "O-s-Oscar P-a-Party"
2017	Nobodies	Herself	Episode: "Not the Emmys"
2017	Idiotsitter	Windy	2 episodes
2017	Danger & Eggs	Various voices	Episode: "Finding Cheryl/The Trio"
2017	Playing House	Dr. Laura Meredith	Episode: "You Wanna Roll with This"
2017	The Guest Book	Phyllis	2 episodes
2017	The Mick	Trish	Episode: "The Friend"
2017	Do You Want to See a Dead Body?	Herself	Episode: "A Body and Some Pants"
2017	Easy	Karen Treska	Episode: "Conjugality"
2017	No Activity	Erin	Episode: "Golden Age of Tunnels"
2017–20	Big Mouth	Cantor Dina Reznick (voice)	6 episodes
2019	Wayne	Maureen McNulty	3 episodes
2019	Catastrophe	Sydney	2 episodes
2019	Schooled	Ms. Taraborelli	Episode: "CB Likes Lainey"
2019	Get Shorty	Ali Egan	6 episodes
2019–21	The Unicorn	Delia	Main cast
2020	Search Party	Polly Danzinger	6 episodes
2020	Make It Work!	Herself	Television special
2021	Close Enough	Brienne Bishop (voice)	Episode: "Where'd You Go, Bridgette?/The Erotic Awakening of A.P. LaPearle"
2021	Archer	Hijacker (voice)	Episode: "Lowjacked"
2022	The Dropout	Linda Tanner	3 episodes
2023	History of the World, Part II	Israeli Ambassador	Episode: "VII"
2023	Tiny Beautiful Things	Amy Adler	2 episodes
2024	Dinner with the Parents	Jane Langer	Main
2024	Abbott Elementary	Miss Barco	Episode: "Smith Playground"
2024	Law & Order	Judge Madeleine Bennett	Episode: "Truth and Consequences"
2025	Hacks	Stacey	7 episodes
2025	Will Trent	Susan Barno	Episode: "Love Takes Time"
2026	The Night Agent	Freya Myers	3 episodes
TBA	The Probability of Miracles	Elaine	Recurring role

=== Podcasts ===
Year	Title	Voice role
2020–21	In Strange Woods	Irene
