= Non-high school district =

Type of school district in the United States

A non-high school district is an American form of public school district which does not provide a high school itself, but instead reimburses nearby public districts with high schools for the education of students in the non-high district. At least two states in the United States, Illinois and Washington, still have districts designated as non-high school districts. Another state, Kentucky, does not use the term, but has four districts that do not operate high schools.

Illinois
Non-high districts have existed since 1917 and are still provided for by statute. An Illinois non-high district is a special form of high school district consisting of the portion of a county not in any high school district or unit school district. It is separate from any local grade school district. It pays the tuition of eighth grade graduates to nearby high schools, and may provide for their daily transportation. Only one remains: Chester Non-High School District 122, whose territory is in and around Prairie du Rocher in Randolph County. More recent Illinois laws allow a unit school district to deactivate either its elementary schools or its high schools and pay the tuition for their students of the appropriate level to attend nearby districts' schools. There were 13 such deactivations between 1984 and 2010.
Washington
All school districts in the state of Washington are either "high school districts" or "nonhigh school districts". Nonhigh school districts select "serving" high school districts, for which the nonhigh district also contributes to building funds, but any high school with more than a third of the nonhigh district's students is always a "serving" district. Students may attend a serving or non-serving district.
Kentucky
State law considers all districts to be either "county school districts" or "independent school districts", with the latter defined as a district whose boundaries do not follow a county line, and does not legally distinguish districts by the grades that they choose to teach. However, four districts, all independent, operate only a single K–8 school.
- Anchorage: A district whose boundaries mostly coincide with those of Anchorage, a semi-independent city within the merged city–county government of Louisville. The district has agreements in place with the surrounding Jefferson County Public Schools and the nearby Oldham County Schools that allow Anchorage students to attend high school in either district free of tuition.
- East Bernstadt: A rural district centering on the community of East Bernstadt. The surrounding Laurel County district treats high school students in the East Bernstadt district as its own students, who can attend either of the county district's two high schools.
- Science Hill: Another rural district, this one centering on the small city of Science Hill. The Science Hill district has agreements with the surrounding Pulaski County district, as well as the Somerset independent district, that allow Science Hill students to attend any of the county's three public high schools. Most Science Hill students choose to attend the Somerset school.
- Southgate: Centered on the city of Southgate, this district has agreements in place with multiple districts in surrounding Campbell County and nearby Boone and Kenton Counties that allow its students to attend high school in any of the cooperating districts, with parents responsible for any tuition fees that the receiving district may charge. The majority of Southgate high school students choose the Fort Thomas district, with most of the remainder opting for the Newport district.

== See also ==
- Sending/receiving relationship
