= List of school districts in Kentucky =

This is a list of school districts in Kentucky, which has two types of public school districts. The first type, county school districts, typically cover all or a large part of a county, and are generally styled "XXXX County (Public) Schools." The second type, "independent" districts, usually encompass cities or groups of cities. These have several different styles, but with one detail in common—"County" is nowhere to be found in the district name. All independent districts operate within a single county, with the following exceptions:

- Burgin, which mainly serves a single city in Mercer County, but also includes a very small part of Boyle County.
- Caverna, which serves two adjoining cities on separate sides of the boundary between Barren and Hart Counties
- Corbin, which serves a single city divided between Whitley and Knox Counties.
- Eminence, which mainly serves a single city in Henry County, but also includes a very small part of Shelby County.

All county districts operate schools from kindergarten through 12th grade. Most independent districts also do so; however, four do not operate high schools. These districts have agreements in place with one or more nearby school districts to allow their students to attend high schools in the other district(s). If a district does not operate high schools, the district(s) that its students will go to at that level will be noted below it.

All school districts organized under Kentucky law are independent governments. There are no public school systems under Kentucky law dependent on another layer of government like a county government or a municipal government.

The Department of Defense Education Activity (DoDEA) operates schools for military dependents at two major United States Army bases in Kentucky, Fort Campbell and Fort Knox. DoDEA has organized a Kentucky-specific district to administer the schools on those bases (although some of the Fort Campbell schools are physically located in Tennessee).

== Multi-County ==
- Central Kentucky Education Cooperative
- Green River Regional Educational Cooperative
- KEDC Special Education Cooperative
- Kentucky District, DoDEA Americas
- Kentucky Educational Development Corporation
- Kentucky Tech Schools (16 schools)

== Barren County ==
- Barren County Schools
- Caverna Independent School District
- Glasgow Independent Schools

== Bell County ==
- Bell County Schools
- Middlesboro Independent Schools
- Pineville Independent School

== Boone County ==
- Boone County Schools
- Walton-Verona Independent Schools

== Bourbon County ==
- Bourbon County Schools
- Paris Independent Schools

== Boyd County ==
- Ashland Independent School District
- Boyd County Public Schools
- Fairview Independent Schools

== Boyle County ==
- Boyle County Schools
- Burgin Independent Schools (a tiny portion)
- Danville Schools

== Bracken County ==
- Augusta Independent Schools
- Bracken County Schools

== Breathitt County ==
- Breathitt County Schools
- Jackson Independent School District

== Breckinridge County ==
- Breckinridge County Schools
- Cloverport Independent Schools

== Calloway County ==
- Calloway County Schools
- Murray Independent School District

== Campbell County ==
- Bellevue Independent Schools
- Campbell County Schools
- Dayton Independent Schools
- Fort Thomas Independent Schools
- Newport Independent Schools
- Southgate Independent Schools
  - The Southgate district does not operate a high school. It has reciprocal agreements with most, if not all, other districts within Boone, Campbell, and Kenton Counties to allow Southgate students to attend high school in those districts. According to a 2015 report by the Legislative Research Commission, the research arm of the Kentucky General Assembly, most Southgate high school students in the 2013–14 school year attended Highlands High School in the Fort Thomas district, with a large minority attending Newport High School in that city's district. Six other Southgate students were attending high school in five other districts.

== Daviess County ==
- Daviess County Public Schools
- Owensboro Public Schools

== Franklin County ==
- Frankfort Independent Schools
- Franklin County Public Schools

== Fulton County ==
- Fulton County Schools (Kentucky)
- Fulton Independent Schools (Kentucky)

== Grant County ==
- Grant County Schools
- Williamstown Independent Schools

== Graves County ==
- Graves County Schools
- Mayfield Independent Schools

== Greenup County ==
- Greenup County Schools
- Raceland-Worthington Independent Schools
- Russell Independent Schools

== Hardin County ==
- Elizabethtown Independent Schools
- Hardin County Schools

== Harlan County ==
- Harlan County Public Schools
- Harlan Independent Schools

== Hart County ==
- Caverna Independent School District
- Hart County Schools

== Henry County ==
- Eminence Independent Schools
- Henry County Schools

== Hopkins County ==
- Dawson Springs Independent Schools
- Hopkins County Schools

== Jefferson County ==
- Anchorage Independent Schools
  - The Anchorage district does not operate a high school. It has reciprocal agreements with both Jefferson County Public Schools and Oldham County Schools that allow Anchorage students to apply for admission to any high school in either district.
- Jefferson County Public Schools

== Johnson County ==
- Johnson County School District
- Paintsville Independent School District

== Kenton County ==
- Beechwood Independent School District
- Covington Independent Public Schools
- Erlanger-Elsmere Schools
- Kenton County School District
- Ludlow Independent Schools

== Knox County ==
- Barbourville Independent Schools
- Knox County Public Schools

== Laurel County ==
- East Bernstadt Independent School
  - The East Bernstadt district does not operate a high school. It has a reciprocal agreement with Laurel County Public Schools that allows East Bernstadt students to attend either of the Laurel County district's two high schools.
- Laurel County Public Schools

== Letcher County ==
- Jenkins Independent Schools
- Letcher County Public Schools

== Logan County ==
- Logan County Schools
- Russellville Independent Schools

== Madison County ==
- Berea Independent Schools
- Madison County Schools

== McCracken County ==
- McCracken County Public Schools
- Paducah Public Schools

== Mercer County ==
- Burgin Independent Schools
- Mercer County Schools

== Nelson County ==
- Bardstown City Schools
- Nelson County School District

== Perry County ==
- Hazard Independent Schools
- Perry County Schools

== Pike County ==
- Pike County Schools
- Pikeville Independent Schools

== Pulaski County ==
- Pulaski County Schools
- Science Hill Independent Schools
  - The Science Hill district does not operate a high school. It has reciprocal agreements with the Pulaski County and Somerset districts that allow Science Hill students to attend high school in either district. According to the aforementioned Legislative Research Commission report, almost all Science Hill students choose to attend the Somerset district's high school.
- Somerset Independent Schools

== Taylor County ==
- Campbellsville Independent Schools
- Taylor County Schools

== Warren County ==
- Bowling Green Independent School District
- Warren County Public Schools

== Whitley County ==
- Corbin Independent School District
- Whitley County School District
- Williamsburg Independent Schools

== Single-District Counties ==
- Adair County Schools
- Allen County Schools
- Anderson County Schools
- Ballard County Schools
- Bath County Schools
- Bullitt County Public Schools
- Butler County Schools
- Caldwell County Schools
- Carlisle County Schools
- Carroll County Public Schools
- Carter County Schools
- Casey County Schools
- Christian County Public Schools
- Clark County Schools
- Clay County Schools
- Clinton County Schools
- Crittenden County Schools
- Cumberland County Schools
- Edmonson County Schools
- Elliott County Schools
- Estill County Schools
- Fayette County Public Schools
- Fleming County Schools
- Floyd County Schools
- Gallatin County Schools
- Garrard County Schools
- Grayson County Schools
- Green County Schools
- Hancock County Schools
- Harrison County Schools
- Henderson County Schools
- Hickman County Schools
- Jackson County Public Schools
- Jessamine County Schools
- Knott County Schools
- LaRue County Schools
- Lawrence County Schools (Kentucky)
- Lee County School District
- Leslie County Schools
- Lewis County Schools
- Lincoln County Schools
- Livingston County Schools
- Lyon County Schools
- Magoffin County Schools
- Marion County Schools (Kentucky)
- Marshall County Schools
- Martin County Schools
- Mason County Schools
- McCreary County Schools
- McLean County Schools
- Meade County Schools
- Menifee County Schools
- Metcalfe County Schools
- Monroe County School District
- Montgomery County Schools
- Morgan County Schools
- Muhlenberg County Schools
- Nicholas County Schools
- Ohio County Schools
- Oldham County Schools
- Owen County Schools
- Owsley County Schools
- Pendleton County Schools
- Powell County Schools
- Robertson County Schools
- Rockcastle County Schools
- Rowan County Schools
- Russell County Schools
- Scott County Schools
- Shelby County Public Schools (Note: While a tiny part of Shelby County is served by the Eminence district, otherwise in Henry County, said area is so small that Shelby County for all practical purposes has a single district.)
- Simpson County Schools
- Spencer County Schools
- Todd County Schools
- Trigg County Public Schools
- Trimble County Schools
- Union County Public Schools
- Washington County Schools
- Wayne County Schools
- Webster County Schools
- Wolfe County Schools
- Woodford County Schools

== See also ==
- List of high schools in Kentucky
- List of middle schools in Kentucky
