= Kentucky Route 393 =

State highway in Kentucky, United States

Kentucky Route 393
- KY 393 highlighted in red

Route information
- Maintained by KYTC
- Length: 10.056 mi (16.184 km)

Major junctions
- South end: KY 1818 near Centerfield
- KY 22 near Centerfield I-71 near Buckner KY 146 in Buckner
- North end: US 42 near Buckner

Location
- Country: United States
- State: Kentucky
- Counties: Oldham

Highway system
- Kentucky State Highway System; Interstate; US; State; Parkways
← KY 392	→ KY 394

Kentucky Route 393 (KY 393) is a 5.325-mile-long (8.570 km) state highway in Oldham County, Kentucky, that runs from Kentucky Route 1818 southeast of Centerfield to U.S. Route 42 north of Buckner.

== Route description ==
Its northern terminus is US 42. From there it continues 5.5 miles (8.9 km) south to a 0.04-mile (0.064 km) overlap with KY 146 in Buckner. It then splits south to continue for 2.5 miles (4.0 km) where it junctions KY 22 near Centerfield. It follows KY 22 east for 1-mile (1.6 km) until it splits to the south. It continues 1.5 miles (2.4 km) south and then terminates at Mount Zion Road. There are no low clearances or weight limits on this particular state route. As of 2009, this route has been relocated and improved. From the interchange of Interstate 71, it has been widened to three lanes with a center turn lane. It has been improved to the junction of State Route 22.

== Major intersections ==
The entire route is in Oldham County.

Location	mi	km	Destinations	Notes
	0.000	0.000	KY 1818 (Mt. Zion Road)	Southern terminus
	2.562	4.123	KY 22 east	South end of KY 22 overlap
	3.517	5.660	KY 22 west	North end of KY 22 overlap
	4.916	7.912	KY 2856 east (Elder Park Road) / Firethorn Drive	Western terminus of KY 2856
Buckner	5.442– 5.566	8.758– 8.958	I-71 – Louisville, Cincinnati	I-71 exit 18
Buckner	6.132	9.868	KY 146 east	South end of KY 146 overlap
Buckner	6.353	10.224	KY 146 west	North end of KY 146 overlap
	11.232	18.076	US 42	Northern terminus
1.000 mi = 1.609 km; 1.000 km = 0.621 mi: Concurrency terminus
