= Matt Rhymer =

American football coach (born c. 1985)

Current position
- Title: Head coach
- Team: Whitley County HS (KY)

Biographical details
- Born: c. 1985 (age 40–41); Harlan, Kentucky, U.S.
- Education: University of the Cumberlands (2007, 2012)

Playing career
- 2003–2006: Cumberlands (KY)
- Position: Linebacker

Coaching career (HC unless noted)
- 2007–2008: Cumberlands (KY) (GA)
- 2009–2011: Cumberlands (KY) (DL)
- 2012: Oneida HS (TN) (OL/DB)
- 2013: South Laurel HS (KY)
- 2014–2021: Cumberlands (KY)
- 2022 (spring): Tennessee HS (TN)
- 2022: Whitley County HS (KY) (DC)
- 2023–present: Whitley County HS (KY)

Head coaching record
- Overall: 50–31 (college); 10–15 (high school)
- Tournaments: 1–2 (NAIA playoffs)

Matt Rhymer (born c. 1985) is an American football coach. He is the head football coach for Whitley County High School, a position he has held since 2023. He was the head football coach for South Laurel High School in 2013, the University of the Cumberlands from 2014 to 2021, and Tennessee High School in the spring of 2022. He also coached for Oneida High School. He played college football for Cumberlands (KY) as a linebacker.

== Head coaching record ==
=== College ===
Year	Team	Overall	Conference	Standing	Bowl/playoffs	NAIA^{#}
Cumberlands Patriots (Mid-South Conference) (2014–2021)
2014	Cumberlands	3–7	2–4	T–4th (East)		
2015	Cumberlands	7–3	4–1	2nd (East)		
2016	Cumberlands	4–6	3–3	T–4th (East)		
2017	Cumberlands	6–4	3–3	T–3rd (Appalachian)		
2018	Cumberlands	10–2	5–1	2nd (Appalachian)	L NAIA First Round	12
2019	Cumberlands	10–2	6–1	2nd (Bluegrass)	L NAIA Quarterfinal	7
2020–21	Cumberlands	4–3	4–3	3rd (Bluegrass)		
2021	Cumberlands	6–4	3–4	5th (Bluegrass)		
Cumberlands:		50–31	30–20			
Total:		50–31				

=== High school ===
Year	Team	Overall	Conference	Standing	Bowl/playoffs
South Laurel Cardinals () (2013)
2013	South Laurel	3–7	0–5	6th	
South Laurel:		3–7	0–5		
Whitley County Colonels () (2023–present)
2023	Whitley County	5–6	1–2	3rd	
2024	Whitley County	2–2	0–0		
Whitley County:		7–8	1–2		
Total:		10–15			
