= Donta Smith =

American basketball player (born 1983)

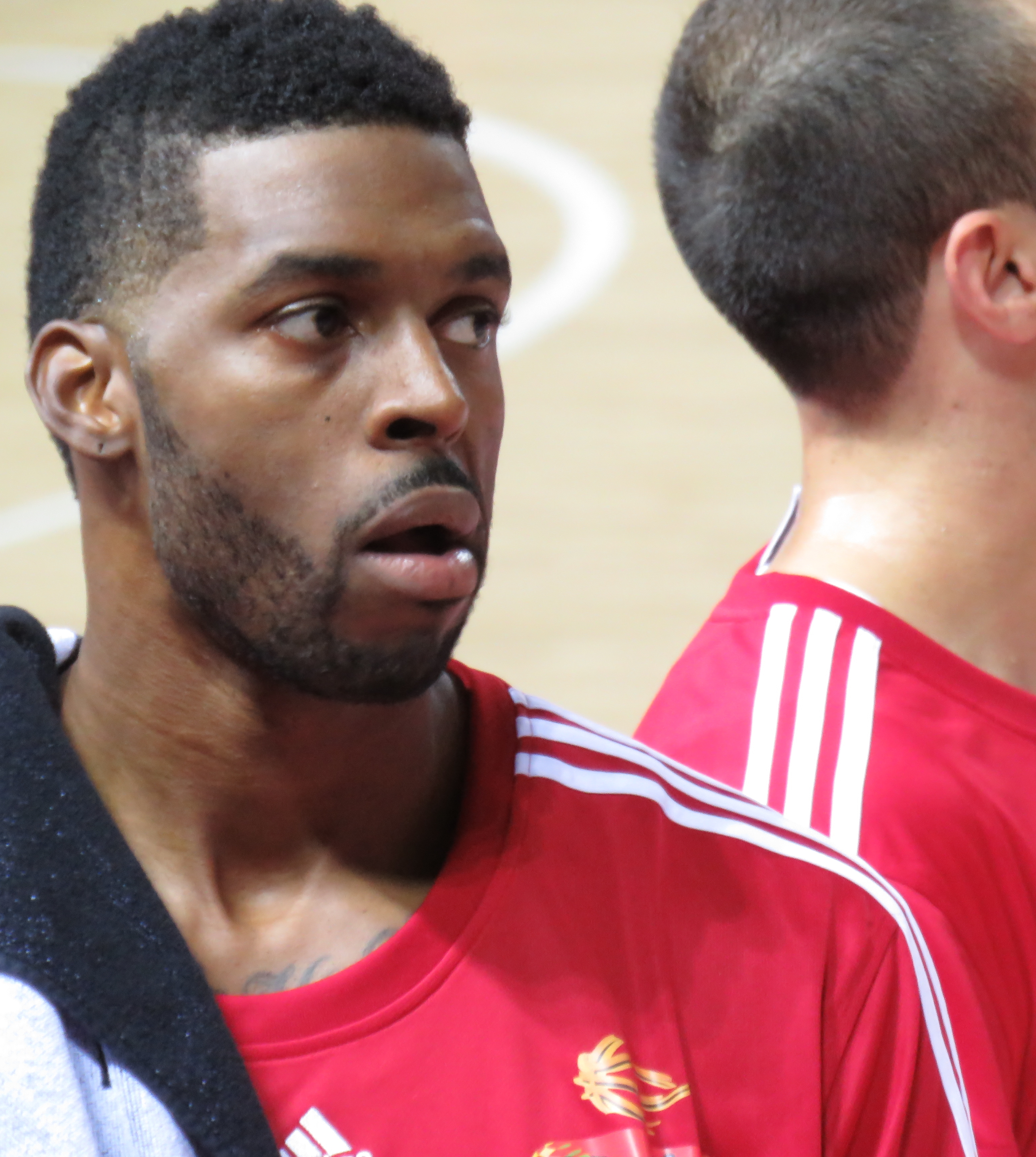
- Smith with Hapoel Jerusalem in 2015

No. 0 – Trotamundos de Carabobo
- Position: Small forward
- League: Superliga Profesional de Baloncesto

Personal information
- Born: November 27, 1983 (age 42) Louisville, Kentucky, U.S.
- Listed height: 6 ft 7 in (2.01 m)
- Listed weight: 220 lb (100 kg)

Career information
- High school: Oldham County (Buckner, Kentucky)
- College: Southeastern Illinois (2002–2004)
- NBA draft: 2004: 2nd round, 34th overall pick
- Drafted by: Atlanta Hawks
- Playing career: 2004–present

Career history
- 2004–2006: Atlanta Hawks
- 2005–2006: →Arkansas RimRockers
- 2007: Academic Sofia
- 2008: Shanxi Zhongyu
- 2008–2009: South Dragons
- 2009: Gigantes de Carolina
- 2009–2010: Shanxi Zhongyu
- 2010: Marinos de Anzoátegui
- 2010: Vaqueros de Bayamón
- 2010: Espartanos de Margarita
- 2010–2011: Liaoning Dinosaurs
- 2011: Marinos de Anzoátegui
- 2011: Fuerza Regia
- 2012: Indios de Mayagüez
- 2012–2014: Maccabi Haifa
- 2014–2016: Hapoel Jerusalem
- 2017: Bucaneros de La Guaira
- 2017: Piratas de Quebradillas
- 2017–2018: Brindisi
- 2018: Santeros de Aguada.
- 2018–2019: Élan Béarnais Pau-Orthez
- 2019–2020: Levallois Metropolitans
- 2020–2021: Maccabi Haifa
- 2021: Cangrejeros de Santurce
- 2023–present: Trotamundos de Carabobo

Career highlights
- 2× LPB champion (2011, 2021); LPB Grand Final MVP (2011); All-LPB Second Team (2021); Israeli Super League MVP (2014); 2× Israeli Super League Quintet (2014, 2016); 2× Israeli Super League champion (2013, 2015); BSN champion (2012); BSN Most Valuable Player (2012); BSN First Team (2012); BSN Defensive First Team (2012); BSN All-Star (2012); NBL champion (2009); NBL Grand Final MVP (2009); First-team NJCAA All-American (2004)
- Stats at NBA.com
- Stats at Basketball Reference

Donta Lamont Smith (born November 27, 1983) is an American-Venezuelan professional basketball player for Trotamundos de Carabobo of the Venezuelan Superliga Profesional de Baloncesto (SPB). Playing for Maccabi Haifa, he was named the 2014 Israeli Basketball Premier League MVP.

== High school ==
Smith played his high school basketball at Oldham County High School, in Buckner, Kentucky, where he was a standout forward on the high school team, and also a record-setting wide receiver on the football team. He also played on the Kentucky (high school) All-Stars in their annual two-game series against the Indiana All-Stars.

== College career ==
After two years of playing junior college basketball at Southeastern Illinois College, Smith was rated as one of the top JUCO prospects, and he committed to play NCAA Division I college basketball for Rick Pitino at the University of Louisville, with the Louisville Cardinals. However, Smith backed out of the commitment, and entered the 2004 NBA draft instead.

== Professional career ==
Smith was taken by the Atlanta Hawks in the second round of the 2004 NBA draft, after playing JUCO college basketball at Southeastern Illinois College, and he averaged 3.3 points per game for the Hawks during his two-season stint. On December 2, 2005, the Hawks assigned Smith to their NBA Development League affiliate, the Arkansas RimRockers.

In January 2007, Smith signed a one-month contract with Bulgarian champions Academic Sofia, which could possibly be extended to five months. On December 24, 2008, Smith signed with the South Dragons of the Australian National Basketball League. He had previously been with the Chinese Basketball Association's Shanxi Zhongyu but was waived to make roster space available for Bonzi Wells.

In 2009, Smith went on to win the 2009 NBL championship with the South Dragons, and was named Finals MVP after starring for the team in the 5-game series. After one season with the South Dragons, Smith would return to the Shanxi Zhongyu for the 2009–10 season. In December 2010 he signed with the Liaoning Dinosaurs.

In 2011, Smith signed with Fuerza Regia in Mexico. He later played for the Indios de Mayaguez of Puerto Rico, and Maccabi Haifa of Israel.

Smith led Haifa to its first Israeli Super League title ever during the 2012–13 season, his first with his team, along with teammate Gal Mekel. In the following season, 2013–14, Smith was awarded the Israeli Basketball League's Most Valuable Player Award, after leading Haifa to the finals for the second time in a row. Haifa, however, could not win the title again, after losing the finals to EuroLeague superpower Maccabi Tel Aviv. In 2014, he was chosen the MVP of the Israeli All-Star game.

In June 2014, after two successful seasons with Haifa, Smith signed a three-year contract with Israeli team Hapoel Jerusalem. In his first season with the team, he was instrumental in its winning its first ever national championship. He left Hapoel Jerusalem in July 2016 after losing the opportunity for a second title to Maccabi Rishon LeZion BC.

On November 23, 2017, Smith signed with New Basket Brindisi for the rest of the 2017–18 LBA season.

On June 4, 2018, Smith signed with Santeros de Aguada for the rest of the 2018 BSN Season.

On July 9, 2018, Smith signed with the French team Élan Béarnais Pau-Lacq-Orthez for the 2018–19 season.

On August 31, 2019, he has signed 3-months deal with Levallois Metropolitans of the LNB Pro A. Smith averaged 8.7 points, 4.4 rebounds and 4.6 assists per game.

On July 15, 2020, he signed with Maccabi Haifa of the Israeli Premier League. On March 8, 2021, he was released by the team. In 2020-21 he was third in the Israel Basketball Premier League in three-point field goal percentage (46.0 per cent), but third in turnovers per game (3.0).

On September 23, 2021, Smith signed with Cangrejeros de Santurce of the Baloncesto Superior Nacional.

== National team career ==
In August 2013, Smith was naturalized as a Venezuelan, in order for him to be able to play with the Venezuelan national basketball team. He played with Venezuela at the 2013 FIBA Americas Championship.
