= Dean Kiekhefer =

American baseball player (born 1989)

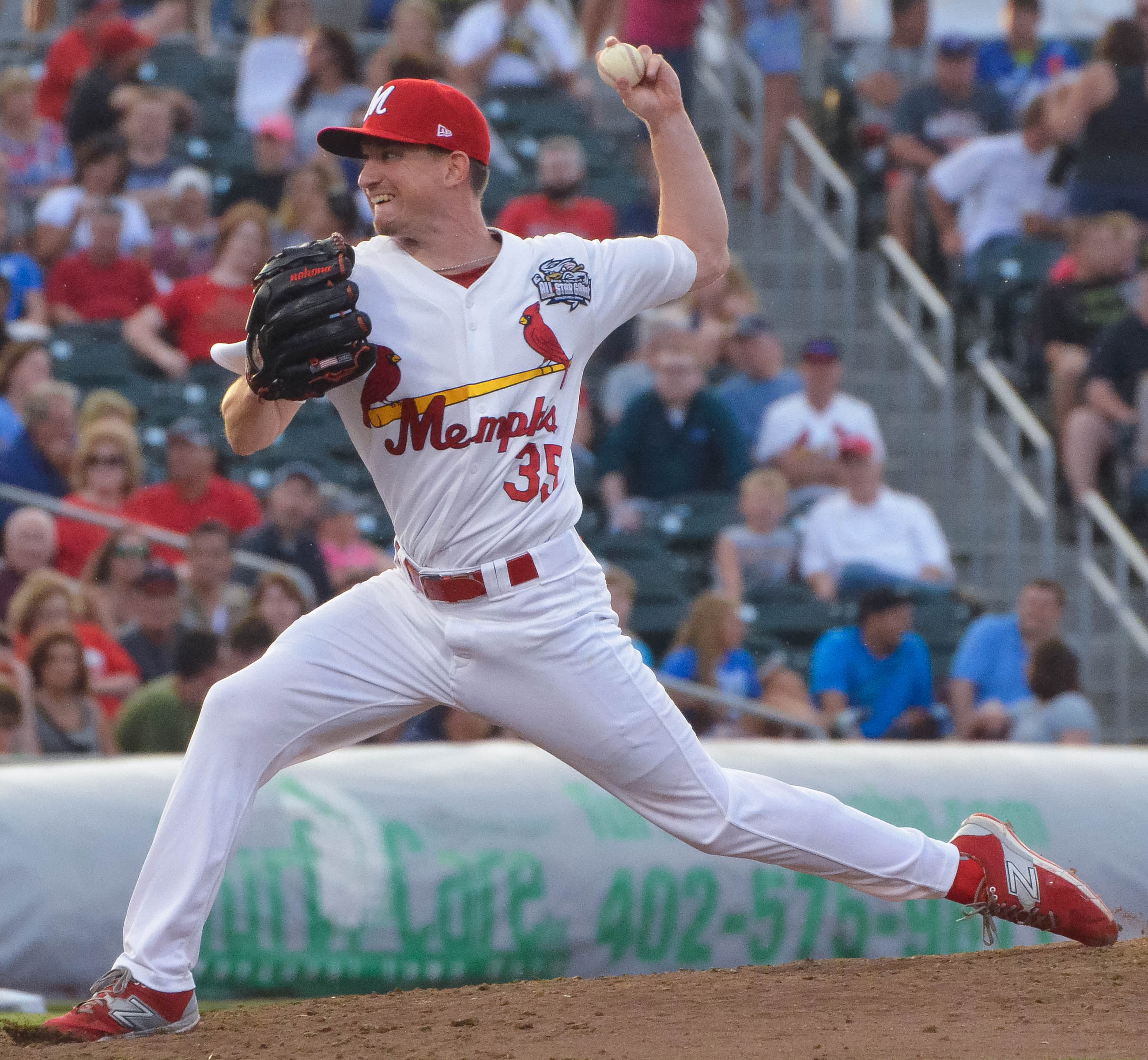
- Kiekhefer at the 2015 Triple-A All-Star Game
- Pitcher / Coach
- Born: June 7, 1989 (age 37); Louisville, Kentucky, U.S.
- Batted: Left Threw: Left

MLB debut
- May 14, 2016, for the St. Louis Cardinals

Last MLB appearance
- September 28, 2018, for the Oakland Athletics

MLB statistics
- Win–loss record: 0–0
- Earned run average: 6.38
- Strikeouts: 15
- Stats at Baseball Reference

Teams
- As player: St. Louis Cardinals (2016); Oakland Athletics (2018); As coach: St. Louis Cardinals (2024–2025)

Dean Allen Kiekhefer (born June 7, 1989) is an American professional baseball coach and former pitcher. He played in Major League Baseball (MLB) for the St. Louis Cardinals and Oakland Athletics from 2016 to 2018.

== Playing career ==
=== Amateur career ===
Kiekhefer attended Oldham County High School in Buckner, Kentucky. The Cleveland Indians selected him in the 37th round of the 2007 Major League Baseball draft. He did not sign with the Indians and played college baseball at the University of Louisville. In 2009, he played collegiate summer baseball with the Wareham Gatemen of the Cape Cod Baseball League.

=== St. Louis Cardinals ===
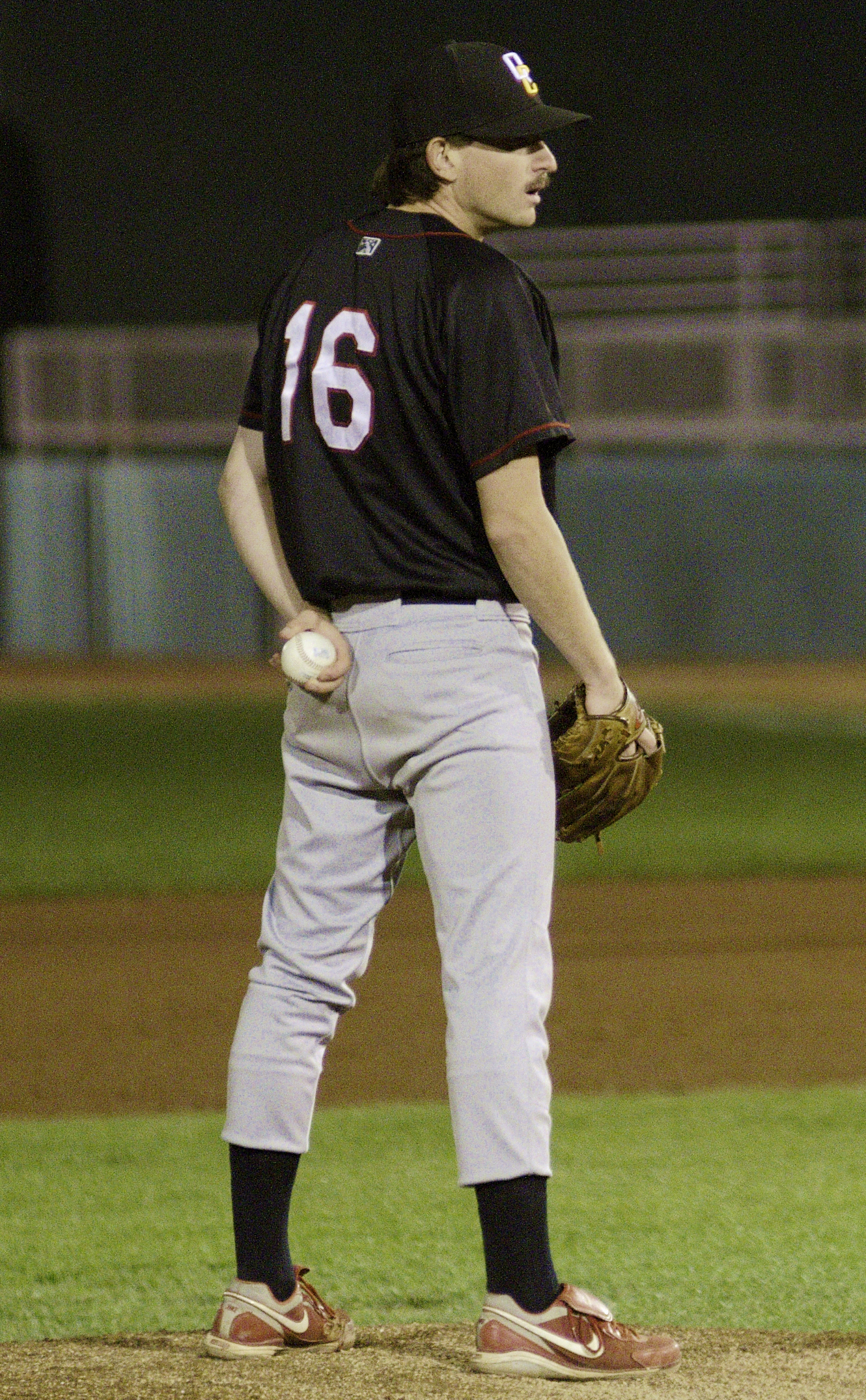
Kiekhefer with the Quad Cities River Bandits in 2011

The St. Louis Cardinals selected Kiekhefer in the 36th round of the 2010 Major League Baseball draft and he signed After signing, Kiekhefer was assigned to the Johnson City Cardinals, and after one game, was promoted to the Quad Cities River Bandits where he finished the season with a 5.14 ERA in 28 innings pitched out of the bullpen. In 2011, he returned to Quad Cities where he pitched to a 4–1 record and 1.26 ERA in 57 relief innings, and in 2012 he played for the Palm Beach Cardinals where he was 2–2 with a 2.24 ERA in 46 relief appearances. He spent 2013 with Palm Beach and the Springfield Cardinals where he was a combined 4–5 with a 3.43 ERA in 36 games between both teams, 2014 with Springfield and the Memphis Redbirds where he posted a combined 2–5 record and 2.90 ERA in 55 relief appearances, and 2015 with Memphis where he was 2–1 with a 2.41 ERA in 50 games.

The Cardinals added him to their 40-man roster after the 2015 season. He began 2016 with Memphis.

The Cardinals called Kiekhefer up to the major league roster on May 13, 2016. The following day, he made his major league debut in Los Angeles in the sixth inning against the Dodgers, allowing no walks and striking out four in 1 2/3 innings. The only hit and run charged to him—both firsts of his career—was a home run to Corey Seager. He was optioned to Memphis and recalled to St. Louis multiple times during the season before being recalled for the remainder of the season on August 29. In 29 appearances for Memphis he was 6–1 with a 2.08 ERA, and in 22 innings pitched for St. Louis he compiled a 5.32 ERA.

=== Seattle Mariners ===
Kiekhefer was claimed off waivers by the Seattle Mariners on November 4, 2016. On December 9, Kiekhefer was removed from the 40-man roster and sent outright to the Triple-A Tacoma Rainiers. He spent all of 2017 with Triple–A Tacoma, where he pitched to a 3–3 record with a 4.47 ERA, 42 strikeouts, and three saves in 49 games. Kiekhefer elected free agency following the season on November 6, 2017.

=== Cincinnati Reds ===
On February 17, 2018, Kiekhefer signed a minor league contract with the Cincinnati Reds. In eight appearances for the Double-A Pensacola Blue Wahoos, recording a 1.13 ERA with 10 strikeouts over eight innings of work. Kiekhefer was released by the Reds organization on April 30.

=== Oakland Athletics ===
On May 2, 2018, Kiekhefer signed a minor league contract with the Oakland Athletics. He began the season with the Double–A Midland RockHounds before being promoted to the Triple–A Nashville Sounds. He was promoted to the major leagues on September 1. Kiekhefer elected free agency on October 15.

On October 18, 2018, Kiekhefer re–signed with the Athletics organization on a minor league contract. In six appearances split between Las Vegas and the rookie–level Arizona League Athletics, he struggled to a 12.79 ERA with 6 strikeouts across 6 1/3 innings pitched. Kiekhefer elected free agency following the season on November 4, 2019.

== Post-playing career ==
Kiekhefer announced his retirement from professional baseball on Twitter on November 7, 2019.

He returned to the Cardinals organization in 2020 as pitching coach of the Class A Short Season State College Spikes before the minor league season was cancelled due to COVID-19. For the 2021 season, he was promoted to pitching coach of the Single-A Palm Beach Cardinals. In the offseason, he served as the Glendale Desert Dogs pitching coach in the Arizona Fall League. For the 2022 season, he became the Cardinals' minor league assistant pitching coordinator.

For the 2024 season, Kiekhefer was promoted to the major league staff as an assistant pitching coach. After the 2025 season, he was reassigned to a strategist role in the organization.
