= Crestwood Elementary School =

Crestwood Elementary School can refer to:

- Crestwood Elementary School, part of the Visalia Unified School District in Visalia, California
- Crestwood Elementary School, part of the Oldham County Schools of Oldham County, Kentucky
- Crestwood Elementary School, part of the Clark County School District in Las Vegas, Nevada
- Crestwood Elementary School, part of the Chesterfield County Public Schools of Chesterfield County, Virginia
- Crestwood Elementary School, part of the Fairfax County Public Schools of Springfield, Virginia
