= North Oldham High School =

Location
- 1815 South Hwy 1793; Goshen, Kentucky 40026; United States
- 38.395°N 85.585°W

Information
- Type: Public Secondary
- Established: 2003
- School district: Oldham County Schools
- Principal: Rush Sullivan
- Grades: 9–12
- Enrollment: 983 (2023-2024)
- Campus: North Oldham
- Colors: Teal, black, and gray
- Nickname: Mustangs
- Newspaper: The North Star
- Website: nohs.oldham.kyschools.us

North Oldham High School is a public school that opened in 2003 to alleviate the overcrowding at Oldham County High School and South Oldham High School. The school is on the North Oldham Campus in Goshen, Kentucky, alongside North Oldham Middle School and Harmony Elementary School. North Oldham High School has been one of the top scoring high schools in Kentucky on the KSA assessments and was awarded a Silver Medal Top High School by U.S. News & World Report.

== Athletics ==
North Oldham is a member of the KHSAA and participates in many sports such as baseball, boys' and girls' basketball, boys' and girls' cross country, field hockey, football, boys' and girls' golf, lacrosse, boys' and girls' soccer, fast pitch softball, swimming, boys' and girls' tennis, boys' and girls' track, volleyball, cheerleading, and wrestling. Their mascot is the Mustang and their school colors are teal, black, and gray.
