= Centerfield, Kentucky =

Unincorporated community in Kentucky, United States

Centerfield is an unincorporated community in Oldham County, Kentucky, United States. It is a small suburban community that lies approximately 4 miles northeast of Crestwood on KY Route 22 and approximately 6.5 miles southwest of La Grange.

Nearby schools are Centerfield Elementary, Locust Grove Elementary and East Oldham Middle School. The two closest high schools are Oldham County High School in Buckner and South Oldham High School in Crestwood.

Residential services are provided by Louisville Gas & Electric, Oldham County Water Company and Spectrum Cable. Fire and police services are provided by the South Oldham Volunteer Fire Department and the Ballardsville Fire Department as well as the Oldham County Police Department.

Businesses include one gas station, one food service facility, and one liquor store.

D. W. Griffith is buried at Centerfield's Mount Tabor Methodist Church cemetery.

== Geography ==
Centerfield is located at 38°21′2.35″N 85°24′26.56″W.
