= East Bernstadt, Kentucky =

Census-designated place in Kentucky, United States

- Census-designated place
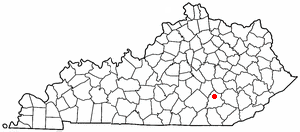
- Location of East Bernstadt, Kentucky
- Coordinates: 37°11′30″N 84°07′55″W
- Country: United States
- State: Kentucky
- County: Laurel

Area
  - Total: 2.12 sq mi (5.50 km^{2})
  - Land: 2.11 sq mi (5.47 km^{2})
  - Water: 0.012 sq mi (0.03 km^{2})
- Elevation: 1,211 ft (369 m)

Population (2020)
  - Total: 809
  - Density: 382.9/sq mi (147.84/km^{2})
- Time zone: UTC-5 (Eastern (EST))
  - Summer (DST): UTC-4 (EDT)
- ZIP code: 40729
- Area code: 606
- FIPS code: 21-23284
- GNIS feature ID: 2402421

East Bernstadt is a census-designated place (CDP) and coal town in Laurel County, Kentucky, United States. As of the 2020 census, East Bernstadt had a population of 809.

== Geography ==
East Bernstadt is located in northern Laurel County. U.S. Route 25 passes just to the southwest of the community, leading southeast 4 miles (6 km) to London, the county seat, and northwest 12 miles (19 km) to Livingston. Interstate 75 also passes to the southwest of East Bernstadt, but without any direct access, the closest being from the Hal Rogers Parkway in London.

According to the United States Census Bureau, the East Bernstadt CDP has a total area of 2.1 square miles (5.5 km^{2}), of which 0.01 square miles (0.03 km^{2}), or 0.46%, are water.

== Tornado ==
During the evening of March 2, 2012, tornado that was rated EF-2 intensity by the National Weather Service (NWS) survey struck the community.

The tornado touched down at approximately 7:05pm EST about 4.3 miles (6.9 km) west of East Bernstadt and traveled for 6.3 miles (10.1 km) before lifting about 3.6 miles (5.8 km) north-northeast of East Bernstadt at approximately 7:12pm EST. The tornado was approximately 310 yards wide and killed six people.

The tornado appears to have been the strongest near location 1, with estimated sustained winds of 125 miles per hour (201 km/h). This is also roughly the area in which several homes were heavily damaged or destroyed, and where the five fatalities took place.

This tornado was just one of many associated with the outbreak that took place across the Ohio and Tennessee Valley region on Friday, March 2, 2012.

== Education ==
Two public school districts serve K-12 students in East Bernstadt. East Bernstadt Independent School District operates a single K-8 school. High school students in the district may attend either high school in Laurel County Public Schools.

== Demographics ==
Historical population
Census	Pop.	Note	%±
2000	774		—
2010	716		−7.5%
2020	809		13.0%
U.S. Decennial Census

As of the census of 2010, there were 716 people, 312 households, and 237 families residing in the CDP. The population density was 371.6 inhabitants per square mile (143.5/km^{2}). There were 350 housing units at an average density of 168.0 per square mile (64.9/km^{2}). The racial makeup of the CDP was 95.22% White, 3.49% African American, 0.26% from other races, and 1.03% from two or more races. Hispanic or Latino of any race were 0.90% of the population.

There were 312 households, out of which 32.4% had children under the age of 18 living with them, 59.6% were married couples living together, 11.2% had a female householder with no husband present, and 24.0% were non-families. 21.8% of all households were made up of individuals, and 7.4% had someone living alone who was 65 years of age or older. The average household size was 2.48 and the average family size was 2.87.

In the CDP, the population was spread out, with 24.4% under the age of 18, 8.3% from 18 to 24, 33.2% from 25 to 44, 24.3% from 45 to 64, and 9.8% who were 65 years of age or older. The median age was 35 years. For every 100 females, there were 95.0 males. For every 100 females age 18 and over, there were 91.8 males.

The median income for a household in the CDP was $62,300.00, and the median income for a family was $28,162. Males had a median income of $25,227 versus $15,625 for females. The per capita income for the CDP was $21,592.00. About 16.2% of families and 19.9% of the population were below the poverty line, including 23.4% of those under age 18 and 23.9% of those age 65 or over.

== Notable people ==
- Robert Goforth, former Kentucky state representative, former Republican candidate for governor
- Carl Hurley, nationally recognized comedian, author and lecturer
- Joe Reaves, retired professional basketball player who played for the Phoenix Suns in the 1973–74 season of the National Basketball Association
