= Shane Andrus =

American football player (born 1980)

No. 8, 3, 9
- Position: Placekicker

Personal information
- Born: October 2, 1980 (age 46); Murray, Kentucky, U.S.
- Listed height: 5 ft 10 in (1.78 m)
- Listed weight: 190 lb (86 kg)

Career information
- College: Murray State
- NFL draft: 2003: undrafted

Career history
- Indianapolis Colts (2006–2007)*; → Hamburg Sea Devils (2007); New York Giants (2008)*; Indianapolis Colts (2008)*; Tampa Bay Buccaneers (2009)*; Indianapolis Colts (2009); Tampa Bay Buccaneers (2009); San Francisco 49ers (2009–2010)
- * Offseason or practice squad member only

Awards and highlights
- World Bowl champion (XV)

Career NFL statistics
- Field goals (%): 2–5 (40%)
- Extra points (%): 13–13 (100%)
- Touchbacks: 2
- Stats at Pro Football Reference

Shane Andrus (born October 2, 1980) is an American former professional football player who was a placekicker in the National Football League (NFL). He was signed by the Indianapolis Colts as an undrafted free agent in 2006. He played college football at Murray State.

Andrus was also been a member of the New York Giants, Tampa Bay Buccaneers, and San Francisco 49ers.

== Early life ==
Andrus attended Murray High School where he played competitive football and baseball. In football, Andrus was an all-state selection as a placekicker and punter, 1st team all region as a wide receiver and defensive back and he gained over 1,700 yards and scored 18 touchdowns in 2 years playing. In baseball, Andrus was an all-state performer as a shortstop and pitcher, participating in the KY state all-star game while hitting over .500 his senior season with 9 home runs, also striking out over 100 batters with a career-high 16 strikeouts in one game. Andrus set a Kentucky state record by hitting a home run in five consecutive at bats. He worked out for professional baseball scouts during his high school summer and decided to focus on football in college.

== College career ==
Andrus attended Murray State University and was a Marketing Major and a letter-man in football & baseball. In football, as a sophomore, he was named an All-American by the AP and second-team sports network all American in 2001. As a junior, he helped his team to a co-Conference Title by going 11–14 and kicking 7 field goals over 45 yards long. He was named first-team ALL-OVC 2 years in a row, both sophomore and junior seasons.

For his career at Murray State, Andrus was 26–36 on field goals and 61–62 on extra points. His only missed PAT came on his final attempt. Andrus hit a school record 52-yard field goal against Eastern Illinois as time expired to secure Murray State a spot in the NCAA Division I-AA playoffs. The victory also gave Murray State a share of the conference championship.

He did not play football his senior season, as he transferred to the University of Kentucky; but he participated in baseball after transferring from Kentucky during the spring.

== Professional career ==
=== Indianapolis Colts (first stint) ===
Andrus was undrafted in the 2003 NFL draft, but was not signed until joining the Indianapolis Colts on February 8, 2006. He was waived on August 14, only to be re-signed two days later on August 18. Andrus was waived again on September 2 and spent the rest of the season out of football.

Andrus was re-signed by the Colts on February 13, 2007, and was allocated to NFL Europa, where he won World Bowl XV playing for the Hamburg Sea Devils. He scored the last point in NFL Europa history by kicking an extra point late in the game. For the season, Andrus was successful on 14 of his 17 field goals, with two of his misses coming from greater than 50 yards.

The Colts waived Andrus on August 28, 2007, and he again spent the regular season out of football.

=== New York Giants ===
Andrus signed with the New York Giants on January 9, 2008, but was waived on February 13.

=== Indianapolis Colts (second stint) ===
After being waived by the Giants, Andrus was claimed off waivers by the Indianapolis Colts on February 14, 2008. However, he was waived prior to training camp on June 11 and spent the rest of the year out of football.

=== Tampa Bay Buccaneers (first stint) ===
Andrus was signed by the Tampa Bay Buccaneers on January 8, 2009, only to be waived on March 11.

=== Indianapolis Colts (third stint) ===
Andrus was re-signed by the Indianapolis Colts on June 9, 2009. He played his first regular season game for them in the 2009 season opener, filling in for Adam Vinatieri, who was recovering from knee and hip surgery. He was waived after that game on September 16. out of football.

=== Tampa Bay Buccaneers (second stint) ===
Andrus was signed on October 5 after the Buccaneers released placekicker Mike Nugent. After going 0-for-1 on field-goal attempts and a perfect 7–7 in extra points in five games with the miss being a block, the Buccaneers waived Andrus in favor of Connor Barth.

=== San Francisco 49ers ===
Andrus had in-season workouts for the Atlanta Falcons, New York Giants, Cleveland Browns, Washington Redskins and Dallas Cowboys in 2009, but was not signed. He was signed by the San Francisco 49ers on January 2, 2010, after injuries to placekickers Joe Nedney and Ricky Schmitt prior to the regular season finale. Andrus resigned with the 49ers on November 17, 2010, to fill-in for injured Joe Nedney after spending the 2010 offseason with the team.

Andrus was released on December 1, 2010, because of a serious ankle injury that forced him to retire. The 49ers signed former Pittsburgh Steeler kicker Jeff Reed.
