= Southeastern Illinois College =

Community college in Harrisburg, Illinois, U.S.

Coordinates: 37°45′9″N 88°26′8″W

- Motto: Succeed. Inspire. Connect.
- Type: Public community college
- Established: June 21, 1960; 66 years ago
- Accreditation: HLC (2019)
- President: Karen Weiss
- Faculty: 90 full-time, 50 part-time (spring 2021)
- Students: 1,379 (Fall 2022)
- Location: Harrisburg, Illinois, U.S.
- Campus: Rural, 90 acres (36.4 ha)
- Newsletter: Falcon Flyer
- Colors: Blue and gold
- Nickname: Falcons
- Sporting affiliations: NJCAA - Great Rivers Athletic Conference; USCAA
- Mascot: Freddie Falcon
- Website: www.sic.edu

Southeastern Illinois College is a public community college between Harrisburg and Equality in Saline County, Illinois. The college was founded in 1960 and offers associate degrees. A secondary campus, the David L. Stanley White County Center, is in Carmi, White County. Approximately 1,379 students are enrolled.

== Academics ==
Southeastern Illinois College confers Associate of Arts, Associate of Science, Associate of Engineering Science, Associate of Applied Science, and Associate in Liberal Studies degrees. The college also supports students who wish to pursue bachelor's degrees. Southeastern has Business & Computer Information Systems, Education and Applied Science, Humanities, Mathematics & Science, Nursing, Occupational Skills and Social Science departments.

== Athletics ==
The college's sports teams are the Falcons. There are men's basketball, women's basketball, men's baseball, women's softball and cross country teams. They compete both in NJCAA Division I and USCAA. Donta Smith, a Southeastern student, played for the National Basketball Association's Atlanta Hawks.

== Campus facilities ==
The George T. Dennis Visual and Performing Arts Center houses an art gallery which carries monthly exhibitions featuring a variety of artists. The Arts center also has a theater which features performances by the college's theater department. The Melba Patton Library contains 40,000 volumes and maintains 250 periodical subscriptions. The Mary Jo Oldham Center for Child Study serves as a daycare and as a place for behavioral studies of children. Southeastern has 20 student clubs, including 3 fraternities (Phi Beta Lambda, Phi Theta Kappa and Theta Sigma Phi).

== "Little Egypt" and Southeastern ==
Southeastern Illinois College is located in an area of Southern Illinois called "Little Egypt". The name may derive from settlers seeing a similarity between their wagon trains and the ancient Israelites, or from the similarity of the Egyptian pyramids and the Mississippian mounds in the area. The college's original 1960 seal had a sphinx on it, and a later logo featured a pyramid. The college's mascot, the falcon, is related to the Egyptian god, Horus. There are many more small things that reflect "Little Egypt" on Southeastern's campus.

== Notable alumni ==
- Donta Smith, former NBA guard/forward, professional basketball player for Maccabi Haifa, 2014 Israeli Basketball Premier League MVP

== See also ==
- List of community colleges in Illinois
