= Anchorage, Kentucky =

Anchorage
- City
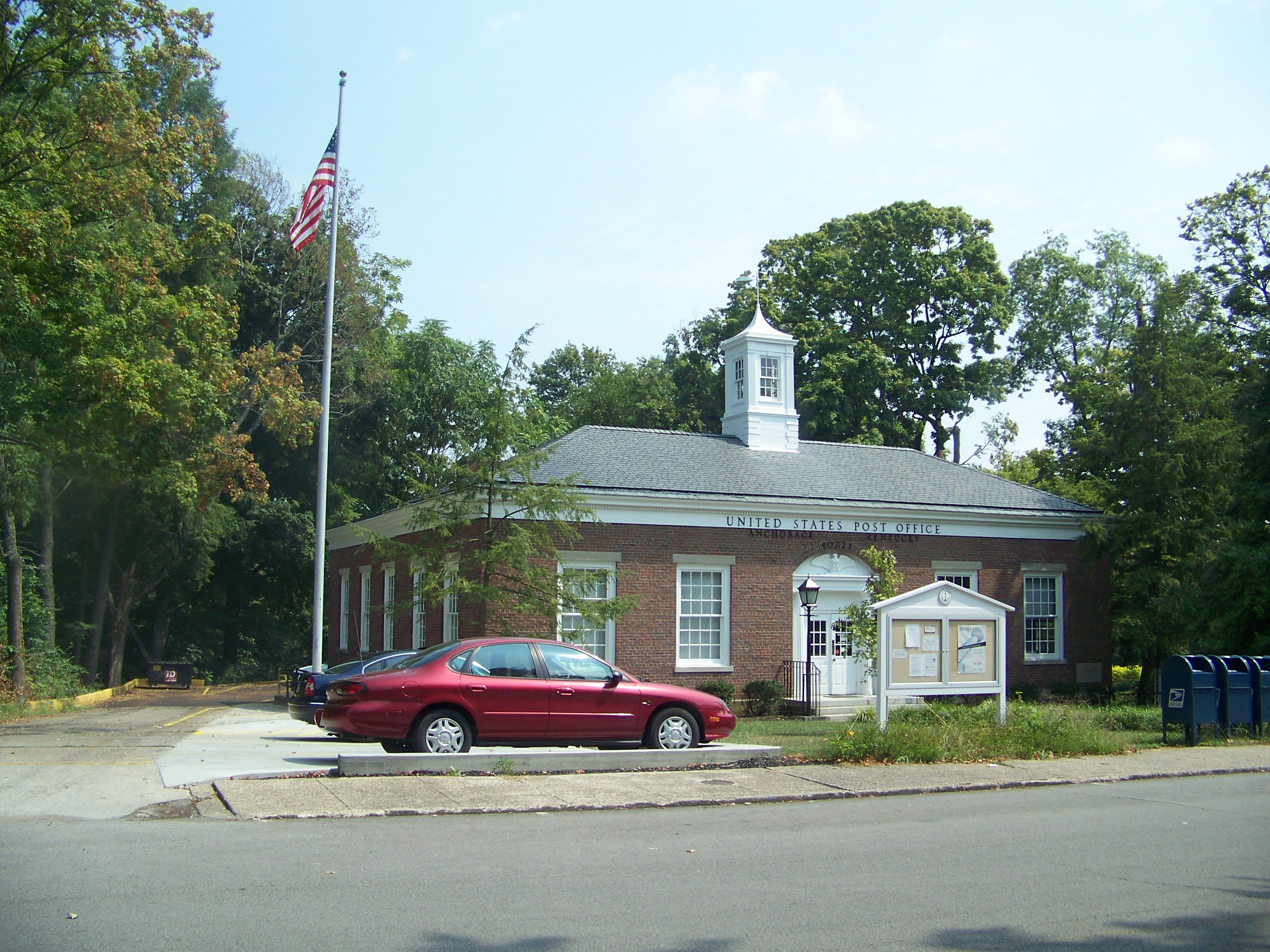
- Anchorage Post Office

- Location of Anchorage in Jefferson County, Kentucky

- Location within the state of Kentucky Anchorage (the United States)
- Coordinates: 38°16′08″N 85°32′11″W
- Country: United States
- State: Kentucky
- County: Jefferson

Area
  - Total: 2.97 sq mi (7.69 km^{2})
  - Land: 2.96 sq mi (7.66 km^{2})
  - Water: 0.012 sq mi (0.03 km^{2})
- Elevation: 728 ft (222 m)

Population (2020)
  - Total: 2,500
  - Density: 844.9/sq mi (326.22/km^{2})
- Time zone: UTC-5 (Eastern (EST))
  - Summer (DST): UTC-4 (EDT)
- ZIP code: 40223
- Area code: 502
- FIPS code: 21-01504
- GNIS feature ID: 2403096
- Website: cityofanchorage.org

Anchorage is a home rule-class city in eastern Jefferson County, Kentucky, United States. The population was 2,500 as of the 2020 census, up from 2,348 at the 2010 census and an estimated 2,432 in 2018. It is an independent municipality surrounded by Louisville Metro and is one of the wealthiest communities in Kentucky.

== History ==
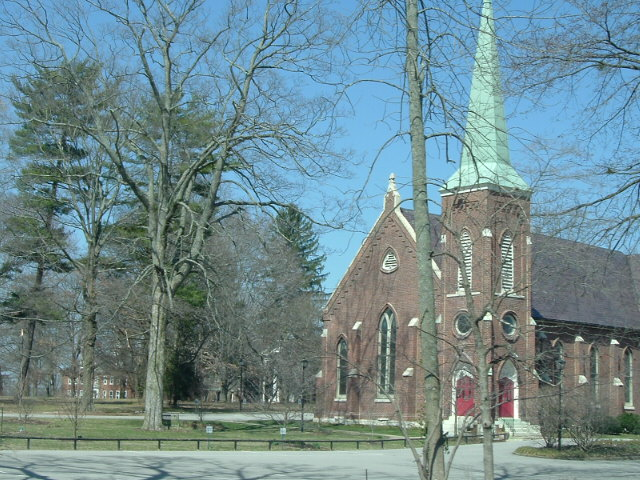
Anchorage Presbyterian Church, est. 1799

The land that is now Anchorage was a part of Isaac Hite's 1773 land grant, which awarded most of the land in today's Jefferson County to officers in the Virginia militia, in exchange for their service in the French and Indian War. Early maps refer to the area as "Hite's Mill", and it has also been known as "Hobbs Station". Part of Hite's original grant now makes up the grounds of Central State Hospital and E. P. "Tom" Sawyer State Park.

The nautical name is a bit odd, considering the city is over 12 miles (19 km) from the Ohio River. The origin is The Anchorage, the estate of riverboat captain and early resident James W. Goslee, and was chosen to honor him when the city incorporated in 1878, three years after his death. Tradition says that an anchor hanging inside the rim of a locomotive wheel at the center of town was taken by Goslee from his ship, the Matamora.

The Louisville and Frankfort Railroad (later purchased by the Louisville & Nashville Railroad) was built through the area in 1849. The development of an interurban rail line in 1901 allowed faster travel between Anchorage and Louisville, as well as other towns in the area.

The heavily shaded city, with temperatures often noticeably cooler than in Downtown Louisville, became a popular location for summer homes for wealthy Louisvillians. One such resident was brewing magnate Isaac Wolfe Bernheim, still remembered locally for his philanthropy. In 1914, Bernheim commissioned the firm of Frederick Law Olmsted to design a plan for Anchorage, which would incorporate stone bridges and triangle intersections, similar to Olmsted's plans for Louisville's park system.

The city has long been known as home of some of the area's wealthiest citizens, though the large old estates have mostly been divided up and many new, still upscale, houses have been built in the area, especially since 1977. Part of the city is designated as the Anchorage Historic District, which was listed on the National Register of Historic Places in 1982.

Papa John's Pizza founder John Schnatter is a resident and owns about 6% of the land in Anchorage, including much of the city center. He restored an interurban rail station, three historic buildings and built a fourth in a similar style in the city's center, with plans to build a bank, an upscale restaurant, and a 2.1 mile walking trail, which opened as the Anchorage Trail in June 2008. He says that his goal was purely to "preserve the city's character".

== Geography ==
Anchorage is located in northeastern Jefferson County. It is bordered to the south by Middletown. Downtown Louisville is 15 miles (24 km) to the west. Interstate 265 passes north and east of Anchorage, with access from Exits 29 (Old Henry Road) and 30 (Kentucky Route 146).

According to the United States Census Bureau, the city has a total area of 3.0 square miles (7.7 km^{2}), of which 0.01 square miles (0.03 km^{2}), or 0.38%, are water.

== Government and public safety ==
Anchorage is managed by a mayor and six councilmen. Council members are elected on an independent ballot for terms that last for a total of two years, while the mayor is elected for terms that last for a total of four years. Public safety is provided by the Anchorage Police Department, a 24/7 on-duty police agency with 10 full-time, sworn officers certified by the Commonwealth of Kentucky. Anchorage is home to a historic fire station and is under the jurisdiction of Anchorage-Middletown Fire and EMS.

Since 2024, Neil Ramsey has served as the mayor of Anchorage. As July 2026, the other council members include:

- Diane Cook
- Matt Delehanty
- Patrick McMahon
- Karin Tyrer
- Bill Wetherton
- T. Hunter Wilson

== Demographics ==
Historical population
Census	Pop.	Note	%±
1880	967		—
1900	421		—
1910	384		−8.8%
1920	447		16.4%
1930	564		26.2%
1940	690		22.3%
1950	883		28.0%
1960	1,170		32.5%
1970	1,477		26.2%
1980	1,726		16.9%
1990	2,082		20.6%
2000	2,264		8.7%
2010	2,348		3.7%
2020	2,500		6.5%
U.S. Decennial Census

=== 2020 census ===
As of the 2020 census, Anchorage had a population of 2,500. The median age was 41.3 years. 32.3% of residents were under the age of 18 and 16.7% of residents were 65 years of age or older. For every 100 females there were 104.9 males, and for every 100 females age 18 and over there were 100.8 males age 18 and over.

100.0% of residents lived in urban areas, while 0.0% lived in rural areas.

There were 784 households in Anchorage, of which 46.9% had children under the age of 18 living in them. Of all households, 81.6% were married-couple households, 5.7% were households with a male householder and no spouse or partner present, and 9.8% were households with a female householder and no spouse or partner present. About 10.1% of all households were made up of individuals and 5.4% had someone living alone who was 65 years of age or older.

There were 810 housing units, of which 3.2% were vacant. The homeowner vacancy rate was 0.9% and the rental vacancy rate was 7.9%.

Racial composition as of the 2020 census
Race	Number	Percent
White	2,230	89.2%
Black or African American	38	1.5%
American Indian and Alaska Native	0	0.0%
Asian	93	3.7%
Native Hawaiian and Other Pacific Islander	0	0.0%
Some other race	10	0.4%
Two or more races	129	5.2%
Hispanic or Latino (of any race)	40	1.6%

=== 2000 census ===
As of the census of 2000, there were 2,264 people, 729 households, and 643 families residing in the city. The population density was 744.0 inhabitants per square mile (287.3/km^{2}). There were 750 housing units at an average density of 246.5 per square mile (95.2/km^{2}). The racial makeup of the city was 97.13% White, 0.84% Black or African American, 1.33% Asian, 0.27% from other races, and 0.44% from two or more races. Hispanic or Latino of any race were 0.75% of the population.

There were 729 households, out of which 52.4% had children under the age of 18 living with them, 81.9% were married couples living together, 3.7% had a female householder with no husband present, and 11.7% were non-families. 10.6% of all households were made up of individuals, and 4.8% had someone living alone who was 65 years of age or older. The average household size was 3.09 and the average family size was 3.33.

In the city, the population was spread out, with 35.0% under the age of 18, 4.0% from 18 to 24, 20.8% from 25 to 44, 32.2% from 45 to 64, and 8.0% who were 65 years of age or older. The median age was 40 years. For every 100 females, there were 99.1 males. For every 100 females age 18 and over, there were 95.5 males.

The median income for a household in the city was $133,969, and the median income for a family was $147,050. Males had a median income of $100,000 versus $47,188 for females. The per capita income for the city was $63,988. About 1.1% of families and 1.87% of the population were below the poverty line, including 1.2% of those under age 18 and 2.5% of those age 65 or over.

== Education ==
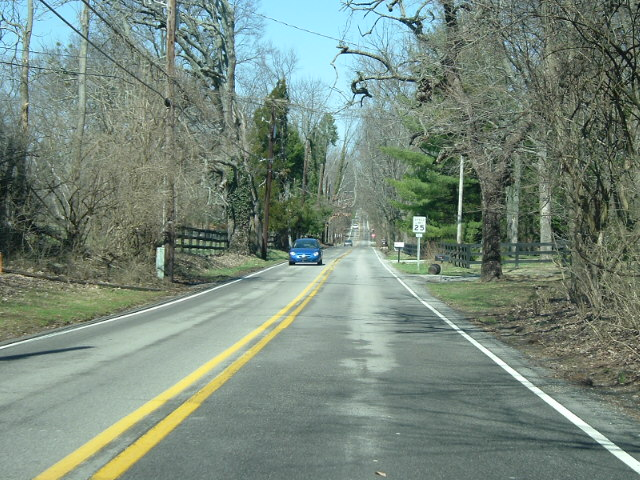
Evergreen Road in Anchorage

Almost all of Anchorage is zoned to Anchorage Public School (K–8), a part of Anchorage Independent Schools. For high school, Anchorage district residents may attend Jefferson County Public Schools (JCPS) or Oldham County Schools. A very small portion is zoned to JCPS for grades K–12.

As of 2024 Sharla Six is the interim Superintendent of Schools.

== Notable people ==
- George Madden Martin (pen name of Mrs. Attwood R. Martin), writer
- Morgan McGarvey, U.S. Representative from Kentucky's 3rd congressional district
- David C. Novak, CEO of Yum! Brands
- Joan Osborne, singer-songwriter
- Virginia Pearson, silent movie star
- John Schnatter, founder and former CEO of Papa John's Pizza

== Climate ==
The climate in this area is characterized by hot, humid summers and generally mild to cool winters. According to the Köppen Climate Classification system, Anchorage has a humid subtropical climate, abbreviated "Cfa" on climate maps.

== See also ==
- National Register of Historic Places listings in Anchorage, Kentucky
