= Anchorage Independent Schools =

School district in Kentucky, United States

Anchorage Independent Board of Education dba Anchorage Public School

Address
- 11400 Ridge Rd. Anchorage, Kentucky, 40223; United States

District information
- Grades: K–8
- Established: 1911
- Superintendent: Sharla Six
- NCES District ID: 2100090

Students and staff
- Enrollment: 365
- Student–teacher ratio: 9.66

Other information
- Website: www.anchorage-school.org

Anchorage Public Schools is a public school district in Jefferson County, based in Anchorage, Kentucky.

== District boundaries ==
The district boundaries almost exactly coincide with those of the city of Anchorage, with small portions of the city lying outside the district. Tiny portions of the district lie within the city of Middletown, and even smaller portions within what the United States Census Bureau calls the "Louisville/Jefferson County balance"—the area where the only local government is the merged government of Louisville and Jefferson County.

== Schools ==
The Anchorage Public School District has one K-8 elementary school. Of the state's current 51 independent school districts, roughly defined by state law as those whose service area does not cover most or all of an entire county, Anchorage is one of four that do not operate a high school (the others being East Bernstadt in Laurel County, Science Hill in Pulaski County, and Southgate in Campbell County).

=== Elementary school ===
- Anchorage Public Elementary School

=== Post-elementary arrangements ===
With the Anchorage district not operating a high school, students must continue their education outside the district. The Anchorage district has reciprocal arrangements with both the surrounding Jefferson County Public Schools and the nearby Oldham County Schools that allow Anchorage students to apply for admission to any high school in either district. The Anchorage district pays all tuition fees.

== See also ==
- Non-high school district
