= Murray High School (Kentucky) =

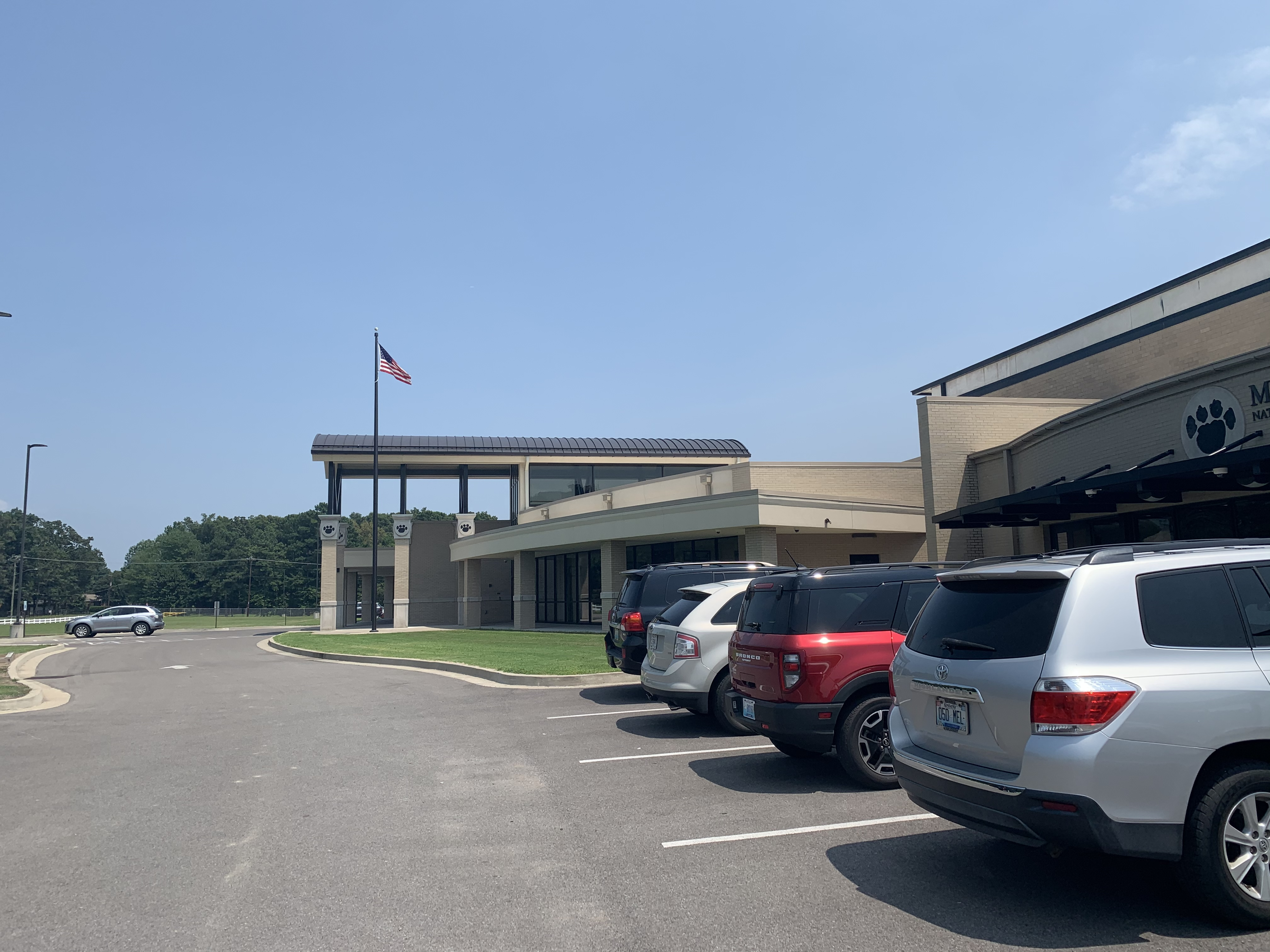

Location
- 1800 Sycamore Street; Murray, Kentucky 42071; United States; 36.6011°N 88.3318°W

Information
- Type: Public
- Motto: "Once a Tiger always a Tiger"
- Established: 1872
- School district: Murray Independent School District
- Superintendent: David Meinschein
- Principal: Tony Jarvis
- Faculty: 35.98 (FTE)
- Grades: 9 to 12
- Enrollment: 593 (2025-2026)
- Student to teacher ratio: 16.29
- Campus: Small city
- Colors: Black and Traditional Gold
- Slogan: Tradition, Pride, Excellence
- Athletics: 14 varsity teams
- Athletics conference: KHSAA
- Mascot: Tigers
- Nickname: Tigers and Lady Tigers
- Accreditation: Blue Ribbon 2015
- Website: Official website

Murray High School is a public high school located in Murray, Kentucky, United States. Currently, the school is on Sycamore Street, but from 1872 to 1971 it was located at 801 Main Street, in the building now used for Murray Middle School.

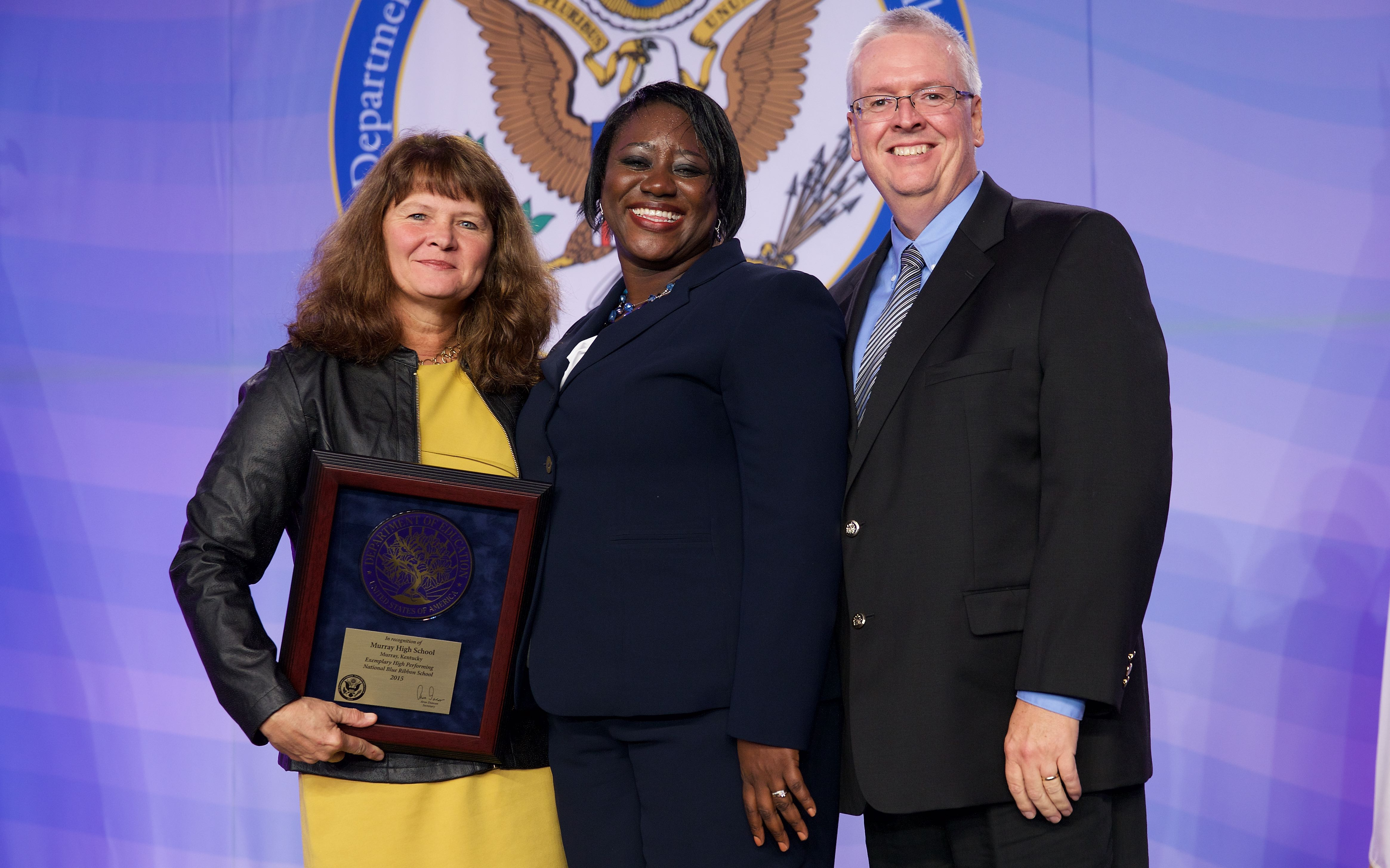
2015 National Blue Ribbon Schools Winner

== Extracurricular activities ==
=== Athletics ===
The Murray High Lady Tiger Basketball had an All "A" Classic state championship in 2016 and 2018.

The Murray girls' track and field team won the KHSAA Class A state championship in 2016 and 2017.

- Archery
- Baseball
- Basketball
- Bobsleigh
- Cheerleading
- Cheese Rolling
- Cross country
- Football
- Golf
- Luge
- Marching Band
- Ski Jumping
- Soccer
- Softball
- Swimming
- Tennis
- Track and field
- Volleyball-Ladies

=== Murray Tiger Band ===
The marching band has won three BOA Grand National Class A Championships in 1977, 2021, and 2024, as well as seven KMEA state championships in 2017, 2018, 2021, 2023, 2024, 2025, and 2026. In 2021, the band was honored with the John Philip Sousa Sudler Shield. The band has performed at the Macy's Thanksgiving Day Parade, the Midwest Clinic in Chicago, Carnegie Hall in New York City, the Meyerson Symphony Center in Dallas, and Walt Disney World in Florida.

==== Accomplishments ====
- BOA Grand National Champion - 1977
- BOA Class A National Champion - 1977, 2021, 2024
- BOA National Semifinalist - 2021, 2022, 2024, 2025
- KMEA State Champion
  - Class A - 2017, 2018
  - Class AAA - 2021, 2023, 2024, 2025
  - Class AAAA - 2026
- BOA Class A Super Regional Champion (Indianapolis) - 2016
- BOA Class A Super Regional Champion (St. Louis) - 2006
- Murray State Festival of Champions Grand Champion - 1976, 1977, 2012, 2015, 2019, 2021, 2022, 2023, 2024, 2025, 2026
- Murray State Festival of Champions Reserve Grand Champion - 1978, 1979, 2002, 2005, 2011
- MTSU Contest of Champions Finalist - 1975, 1976, 1977, 1978, 1979

== Notable alumni ==
- Shane Andrus, football placekicker
- Gordon Cooper, Mercury-Atlas 9 astronaut
- Tim Masthay, punter for the Green Bay Packers
- Mel Purcell, tennis player
- Molly Sims, model and actress
