= Chester Non-High School District 122 =

School district in Randolph County, Illinois, United States

Coordinates: 38°4′N 90°7′W

Address
- 107 East Mill Street Waterloo, Illinois; United States

District information
- NCES District ID: 1700333

Chester Non-High School District 122 is the only remaining non-high school district in Illinois; the district provides for the tuition and transportation of local eighth-grade school graduates to nearby high schools. The district is the western corner of Randolph County, containing the village of Prairie du Rocher, and is coextensive with Prairie du Rocher Community Consolidated School District 134.

Formation of non-high school districts were enabled by state legislation in 1917 and their provisions remain statute law in Illinois.

In the 2009–2010 school year, it had 1 part-time staff member, and sent an average of 44 students each day to nearby high schools. As of 2006, District 122 provided tuition for students to attend Red Bud High School in Red Bud and for a special education student to attend Waterloo High School in Waterloo, Illinois. The Red Bud students are picked up by bus in Prairie de Rocher each day. In addition, District 122 students who attend the private Gibault Catholic High School still have their driver's education paid by District 122 since Gibault students take driver's education at Waterloo High School. The sole paid staff member for 2009–2010 wrote his Ph.D. dissertation on this school district in 2006.

== See also ==
- Prairie du Rocher, Illinois
- Prairie du Rocher Precinct, Randolph County, Illinois
