= Sending/receiving relationship =

Term used in primary and secondary education

A sending/receiving relationship is one in which a public school district sends some or all of its students to attend the schools of another district. This is often done to achieve costs savings in smaller districts or continues after districts have grown as part of a historical relationship. The term is used in primary and secondary education in the states of New Jersey, Delaware, and Pennsylvania in the United States, although the concept exists in other states.

At times, the sending district may be granted representation on the receiving district's board of education. On the receiving district's board of education, the sending representative usually votes only on issues pertaining to the students received and district-wide issues. This is mainly to save money for the township and citizens who have to pay taxes for the school. In addition the sending representative is not allowed to vote on issues pertaining to transportation on the receiving district's board of education; transportation is handled by the sending district.

Demographic changes in either of the districts may cause the sending district to seek to end the relationship. Some districts have sought to gain local control of education methods and facilities by pulling out of existing sending relationships.

== See also ==
- Non-high school district
