= Oldham County High School =

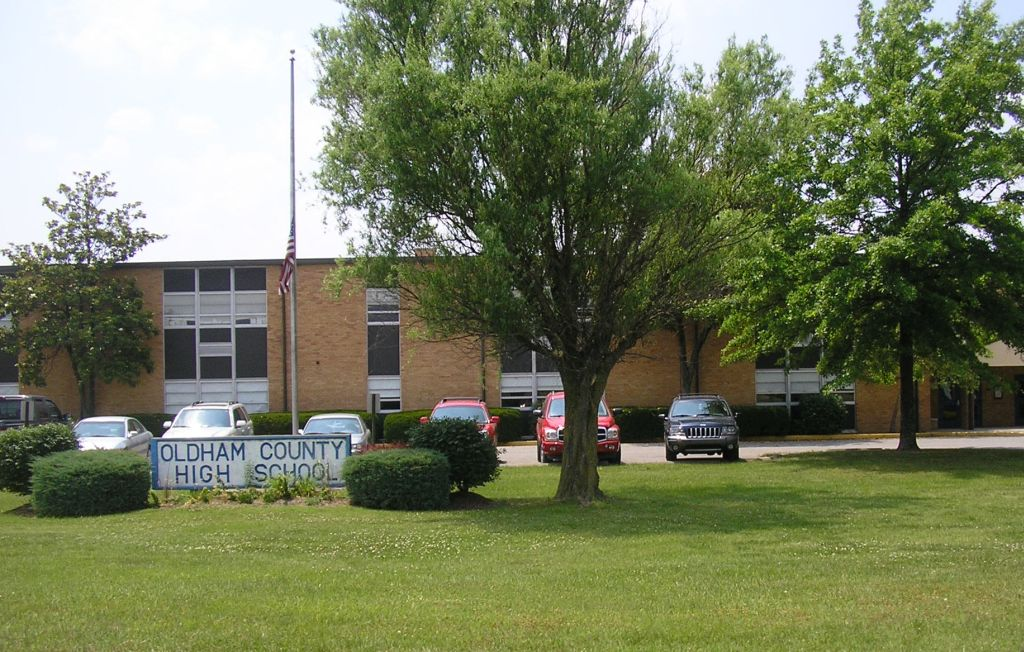

Location
- 1150 North Hwy. 393; Buckner, Kentucky 40010
- Coordinates: 38.388°N 85.437°W

Information
- Motto: "We bring learning to life."
- Established: 1953
- School district: Oldham County Schools
- Principal: Natalie Brown
- Staff: 77.56 (FTE)
- Grades: 9-12
- Student to teacher ratio: 21.07
- Colors: Blue and white
- Team name: Colonels
- Newspaper: The Clarion Colonel
- Information: (502) 222-9461
- Website: https://ochs.oldham.kyschools.us

Oldham County High School (OCHS) is a public high school in Buckner, Kentucky, United States. It was founded in 1953 and has a student body of approximately 1,600 students in grades 9–12. OCHS was given the National Blue Ribbon School of Excellence award in 1985 and 2002 respectively.

== History ==
In the early 20th century, high school classes in Oldham County were held in a two-room house in Centerfield. Oldham County had established the Oldham County Public High School by 1903, i a purpose-built high school building. It moved to North Hwy 393 in LaGrange in 1953. The old high school was converted into First Baptist Church of La Grange in the mid-1960s. The original building burned in the 1990s, replaced by a church.

In 1989 South Oldham High School opened due to overcrowding at Oldham, and in 2003 North Oldham High School opened as the community grew.

The school gained accreditation by the Southern Association of Colleges and Schools in 1960.

== Notable alumni ==
- Tom Blankenship, musician
- Kyra Elzy, basketball coach
- Dean Kiekhefer, baseball player
- David W. Osborne, Kentucky State Representative
- Jon Rauch, baseball pitcher
- Dallas Robinson, bobsledder
- Donta Smith, basketball player
