= Murray, Kentucky =

- City
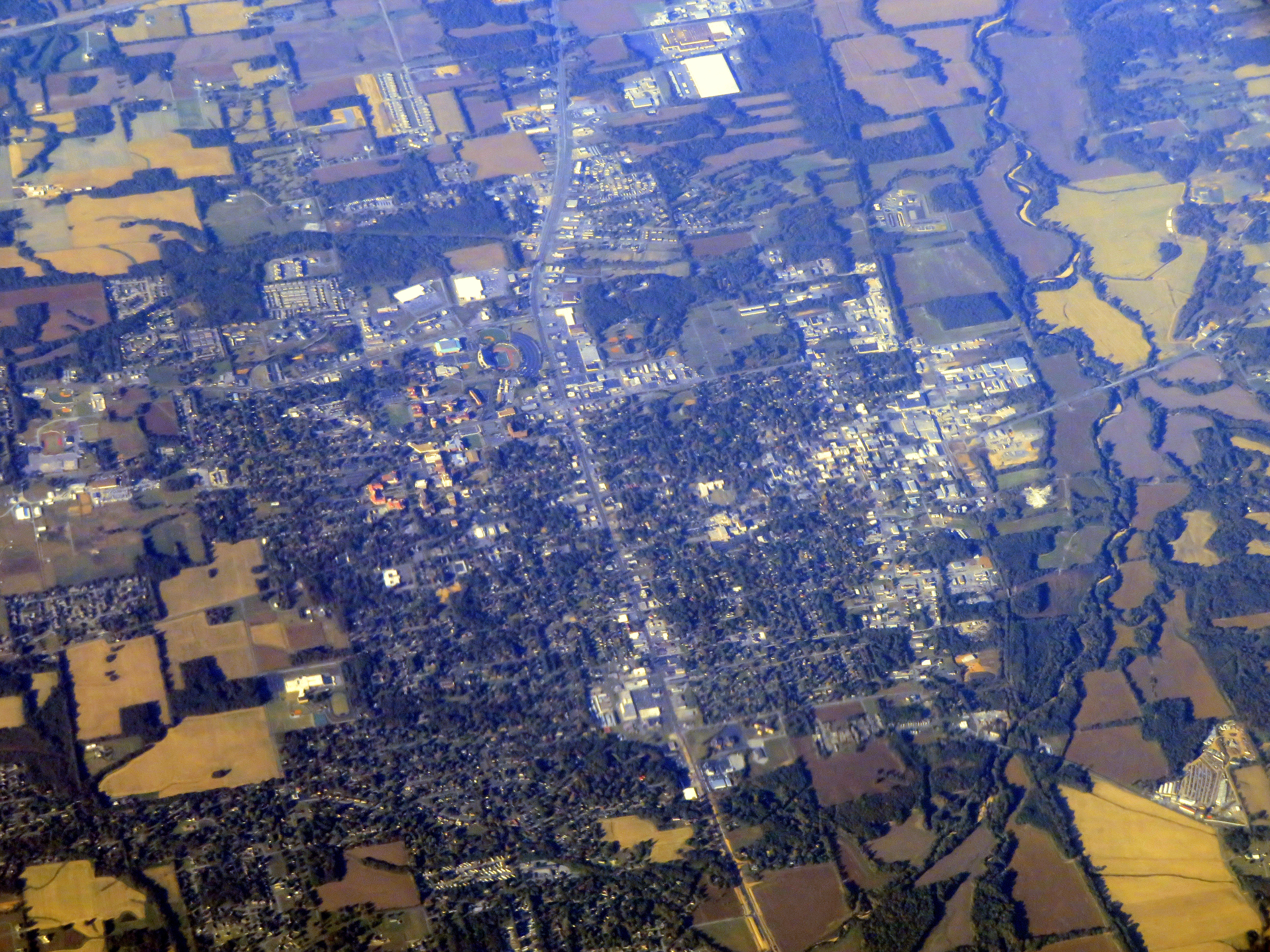
- An aerial view of Murray in 2020

- Location of Murray in Calloway County, Kentucky
- Coordinates: 36°36′34″N 88°18′56″W
- Country: United States
- State: Kentucky
- County: Calloway
- Founded: c. 1822
- Incorporated: January 17, 1844
- Named for: John L. Murray

Government
  - Mayor: Bob Rogers

Area
  - City: 11.68 sq mi (30.24 km^{2})
  - Land: 11.65 sq mi (30.17 km^{2})
  - Water: 0.027 sq mi (0.07 km^{2})
- Elevation: 535 ft (163 m)

Population (2020)
  - City: 17,307
  - Estimate (2025): 18,964
  - Density: 1,485.5/sq mi (573.57/km^{2})
  - Metro: 37,191
- Time zone: UTC−6 (CST)
  - Summer (DST): UTC−5 (CDT)
- ZIP Code: 42071
- Area codes: 270 & 364
- FIPS code: 21-54642
- GNIS feature ID: 0499118yky.
- Website: www.murrayky.gov

Murray is a home rule-class city in Calloway County, Kentucky, United States. It is the county seat of Calloway County and the 19th-largest city in Kentucky. The city's population was 17,307 during the 2020 U.S. census, and its micropolitan area's population is 37,191. Murray is a college town and is the home of Murray State University.

== History ==
=== Early history ===
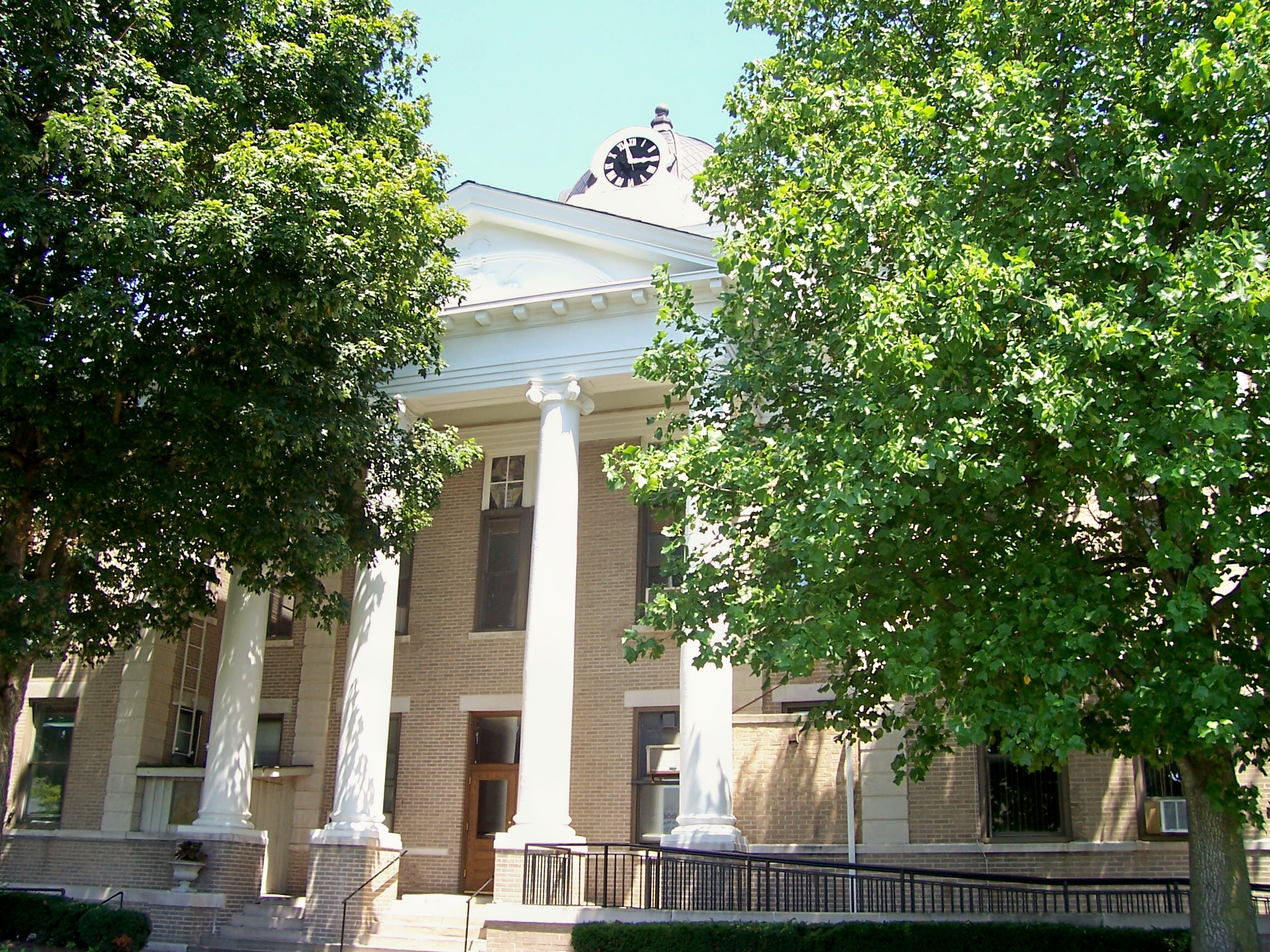
Calloway County courthouse on Murray's court square

The city now known as Murray began as a post office and trading center sometime in the early 1820s. It was at first called “Williston” in honor of James Willis, an early settler. Later, the name was changed to “Pooltown” after Robert Pool, a local merchant. The name was changed again to “Pleasant Springs” before its incorporation on January 17, 1844, when the present name was adopted to honor Rep. John Murray.

Murray was not the first county seat, which was at Wadesboro. Calloway County was then much larger than today. In 1842, however, the state legislature divided the area, creating Marshall County. It was felt that a more centrally located county seat was needed, and as the village of Murray was at the geographic center, it was chosen. A new courthouse was built along with a jail, and the town Murray was laid out on an 80-acre (320,000 m^{2}) plot subdivided into 137 business and residential lots divided by eight streets.

=== The Civil War era ===
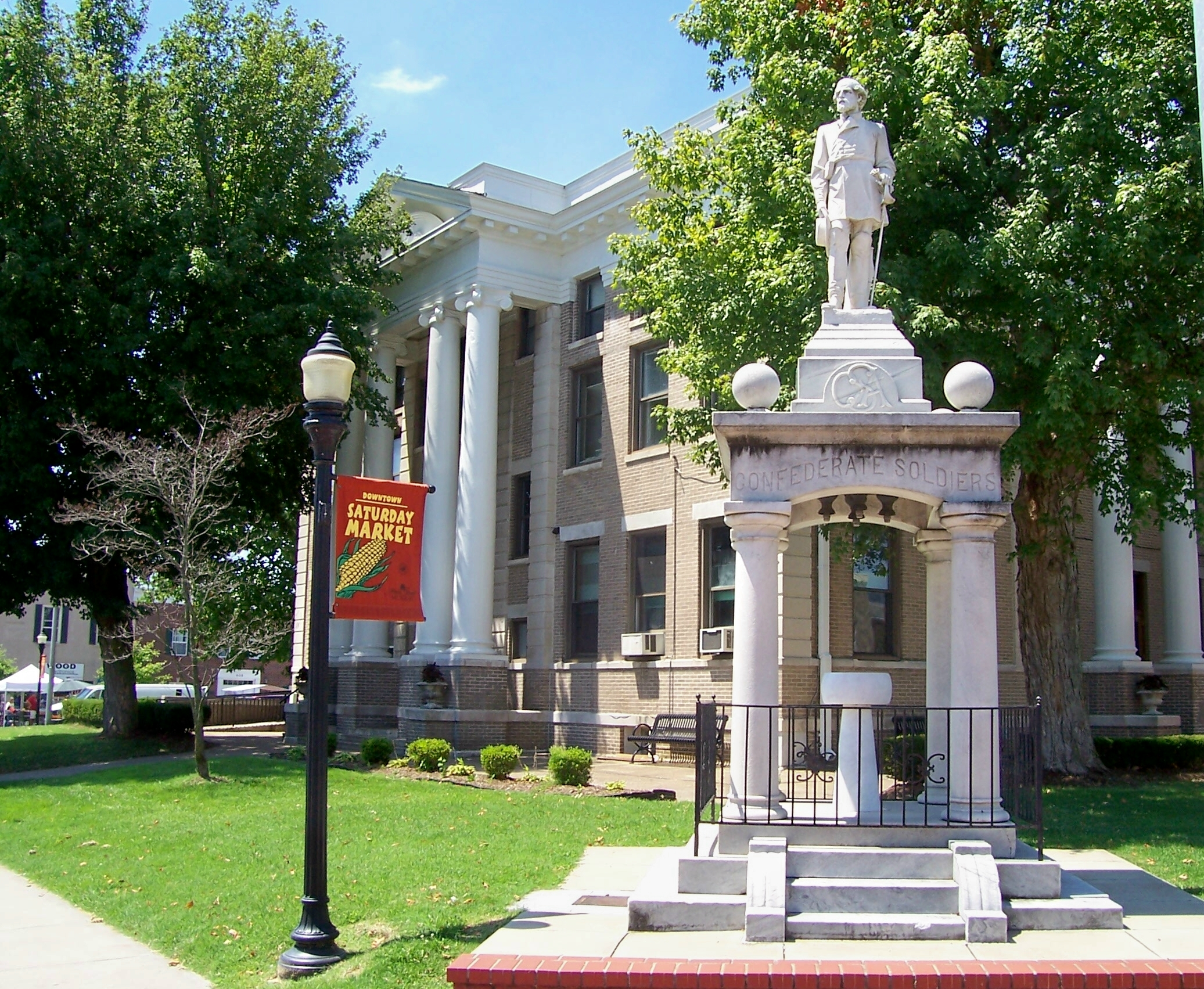
Monument honoring the Confederate soldiers on the northeast corner of the Murray court square

Kentucky did not officially secede from the Union at the start during the Civil War, instead declaring its neutrality, but both Murray and Calloway County were strongly pro-Confederate. Calloway County was one of the counties that sent a delegate to the Russellville Convention signing an Ordinance of Secession in which the Confederate government of Kentucky was formed and Kentucky was admitted into the Confederacy on December 10, 1861, with Bowling Green as the first capital. This region fell under Confederate control early in the war. No major battles were fought near the town, but guerrilla warfare sometimes took place nearby. In the spring of 1862, a Union force stationed in Paducah marched across the county to the Tennessee River, taking anything it wanted from the inhabitants without paying. Also, parts of Murray were burned on several occasions. Once, part of the town was burned by the Union Army in retaliation for its presumed support for the Confederate guerrillas. A diary kept by Josh Ellison of Murray tells that one night during the winter of 1864–65, a detachment of Union soldiers from Paducah torched every building on the east side of the court square, and three days later burned all those north of the square.

An estimated 800 men from the area joined in the Confederate Army, either as infantry in the Kentucky Orphan Brigade or in the cavalry. About 200 sided with the Union. Calloway County's Confederate veterans are honored by a monument on the northeast side of the court house square. The Confederate Monument was donated by the United Daughters of the Confederacy and has been subject to calls for removal most recently in 2020. The courthouse grounds on which the statue stands belongs to Calloway County, and the County Court voted unanimously in 2020 to keep the statue rather than relocate it from courthouse grounds.

== Demographics and geography ==
Murray is located at 36°36′34″N 88°18′56″W (36.609494, −88.315656), 7 miles (11 km) north of the Tennessee border. Benton is 19 miles (31 km) to the north, and Mayfield is 24 miles (39 km) to the northwest.

According to the United States Census Bureau, the city has a total area of 11.3 square miles (29.2 km^{2}), of which 0.29 square miles (0.75 km^{2}), or 0.26%, is water.

Murray is situated 15 miles (24 km) west of the 170,000 acres (690 km^{2}) of the Land Between the Lakes National Recreation Area, which offers hiking, elk and bison viewing, birding, 1850s historic buildings, a planetarium, a nature center, off-highway vehicle riding, fishing, boating, swimming, camping, and a large wildlife population.

=== Climate ===
Murray has a humid subtropical climate and four distinct seasons. The warmest month of the year is July, with an average high temperature of 90 °F (32 °C). The coldest month is January, with an average high temperature of 45 °F.

Climate data for Murray, Kentucky (1991–2020 normals, extremes 1926–present)
Month	Jan	Feb	Mar	Apr	May	Jun	Jul	Aug	Sep	Oct	Nov	Dec	Year
Record high °F (°C)	76 (24)	81 (27)	92 (33)	92 (33)	101 (38)	106 (41)	110 (43)	109 (43)	108 (42)	97 (36)	86 (30)	79 (26)	110 (43)
Mean maximum °F (°C)	66.3 (19.1)	71.6 (22.0)	79.4 (26.3)	85.2 (29.6)	89.5 (31.9)	94.4 (34.7)	96.5 (35.8)	96.9 (36.1)	92.8 (33.8)	85.6 (29.8)	75.8 (24.3)	67.2 (19.6)	98.2 (36.8)
Mean daily maximum °F (°C)	45.6 (7.6)	50.4 (10.2)	60.6 (15.9)	71.4 (21.9)	78.9 (26.1)	86.3 (30.2)	89.3 (31.8)	88.8 (31.6)	82.6 (28.1)	71.2 (21.8)	58.4 (14.7)	48.4 (9.1)	69.3 (20.7)
Daily mean °F (°C)	36.5 (2.5)	40.5 (4.7)	49.4 (9.7)	59.4 (15.2)	68.0 (20.0)	75.8 (24.3)	79.2 (26.2)	78.1 (25.6)	71.4 (21.9)	59.8 (15.4)	48.0 (8.9)	39.6 (4.2)	58.8 (14.9)
Mean daily minimum °F (°C)	27.4 (−2.6)	30.7 (−0.7)	38.2 (3.4)	47.5 (8.6)	57.0 (13.9)	65.4 (18.6)	69.0 (20.6)	67.4 (19.7)	60.3 (15.7)	48.4 (9.1)	37.6 (3.1)	30.7 (−0.7)	48.3 (9.1)
Mean minimum °F (°C)	10.1 (−12.2)	13.7 (−10.2)	21.5 (−5.8)	32.4 (0.2)	43.3 (6.3)	55.0 (12.8)	61.4 (16.3)	58.9 (14.9)	47.2 (8.4)	33.7 (0.9)	23.0 (−5.0)	15.3 (−9.3)	6.9 (−13.9)
Record low °F (°C)	−20 (−29)	−12 (−24)	−6 (−21)	20 (−7)	33 (1)	39 (4)	44 (7)	39 (4)	28 (−2)	21 (−6)	−1 (−18)	−13 (−25)	−20 (−29)
Average precipitation inches (mm)	4.24 (108)	5.17 (131)	5.54 (141)	5.58 (142)	5.76 (146)	5.31 (135)	4.73 (120)	3.60 (91)	3.86 (98)	4.14 (105)	4.63 (118)	5.53 (140)	58.09 (1,475)
Average snowfall inches (cm)	2.3 (5.8)	1.8 (4.6)	1.0 (2.5)	0.1 (0.25)	0.0 (0.0)	0.0 (0.0)	0.0 (0.0)	0.0 (0.0)	0.0 (0.0)	0.1 (0.25)	0.1 (0.25)	1.1 (2.8)	6.5 (17)
Average precipitation days (≥ 0.01 in)	10.6	10.0	11.5	11.1	11.7	9.9	9.0	7.8	6.8	8.1	9.4	11.2	117.1
Average snowy days (≥ 0.1 in)	1.4	1.2	0.5	0.1	0.0	0.0	0.0	0.0	0.0	0.1	0.1	0.6	4.0
Source: NOAA

==== Tornadoes and storms ====
Murray has had several tornadoes and storms in recent years and has been the site of two F4 tornadoes. On February 5, 2008, Kentucky and surrounding states were subject to many violent tornadoes with some of them in Western Kentucky. On June 30, 2009, a violent storm with winds of up to 90 miles per hour (140 km/h) ravaged trees and damaged buildings. On July 4, 2009, another tornado outbreak in Western Kentucky interrupted Independence Day celebrations throughout the region.

=== Cityscape ===
The architecture of Murray preserves its history throughout many of its downtown businesses. A commemoration was held on October 28, 2014, for the 150th Civil War anniversary of Fort Heiman in New Concord, Kentucky, which became a National Battlefield on October 30, 2006.

=== Census data ===
Historical population
Census	Pop.	Note	%±
1860	218		—
1870	179		−17.9%
1880	636		255.3%
1890	518		−18.6%
1900	1,822		251.7%
1910	2,089		14.7%
1920	2,415		15.6%
1930	2,891		19.7%
1940	3,773		30.5%
1950	6,035		60.0%
1960	9,303		54.2%
1970	13,537		45.5%
1980	14,248		5.3%
1990	14,439		1.3%
2000	14,950		3.5%
2010	17,741		18.7%
2020	17,307		−2.4%
2024 (est.)	18,567		7.3%
U.S. Decennial Census

=== 2020 census ===
As of the 2020 census, Murray had a population of 17,307. The median age was 28.3 years. 16.4% of residents were under the age of 18 and 15.6% of residents were 65 years of age or older. For every 100 females there were 85.6 males, and for every 100 females age 18 and over there were 83.1 males age 18 and over.

98.3% of residents lived in urban areas, while 1.7% lived in rural areas.

There were 6,759 households in Murray, of which 23.5% had children under the age of 18 living in them. Of all households, 33.3% were married-couple households, 23.0% were households with a male householder and no spouse or partner present, and 36.4% were households with a female householder and no spouse or partner present. About 39.9% of all households were made up of individuals and 13.6% had someone living alone who was 65 years of age or older.

There were 7,872 housing units, of which 14.1% were vacant. The homeowner vacancy rate was 2.6% and the rental vacancy rate was 12.4%.

Racial composition as of the 2020 census
Race	Number	Percent
White	14,332	82.8%
Black or African American	1,115	6.4%
American Indian and Alaska Native	24	0.1%
Asian	358	2.1%
Native Hawaiian and Other Pacific Islander	9	0.1%
Some other race	349	2.0%
Two or more races	1,120	6.5%
Hispanic or Latino (of any race)	798	4.6%

=== 2000 census ===
As of the 2000 census, there were 14,950 people, 6,004 households, and 2,869 families residing in the city. The population density was 1,541.5 inhabitants per square mile (595.2/km^{2}). There were 6,622 housing units at an average density of 682.8 per square mile (263.6/km^{2}). The racial makeup of the city was 88.16% White, 6.80% African American, 0.21% Native American, 2.75% Asian, 0.02% Pacific Islander, 0.68% from other races, and 1.38% from two or more races. Hispanic or Latino people of any race were 1.73% of the population.

There were 6,004 households, out of which 19.5% had children under the age of 18 living with them, 35.6% were married couples living together, 9.5% had a female householder with no husband present, and 52.2% were non-families. 39.1% of all households were made up of individuals, and 13.6% had someone living alone who was 65 years of age or older. The average household size was 2.02 and the average family size was 2.70.

In the city, the population was spread out, with 13.6% under the age of 18, 33.7% from 18 to 24, 20.7% from 25 to 44, 16.0% from 45 to 64, and 16.0% who were 65 years of age or older. The median age was 26 years. For every 100 females, there were 86.7 males. For every 100 females age 18 and over, there were 83.8 males.

The median income for a household in the city was $25,647, and the median income for a family was $41,331. Males had a median income of $30,266 versus $22,294 for females. The per capita income for the city was $15,389. About 11.2% of families and 22.1% of the population were below the poverty line, including 20.8% of those under age 18 and 9.9% of those age 65 or over.

=== Religion ===
The city of Murray is host to 75 religious assemblies within the surrounding area. Baptists are the most prominent faith in Murray, with 28 assemblies within the area.

== Culture ==
=== Museums and galleries ===
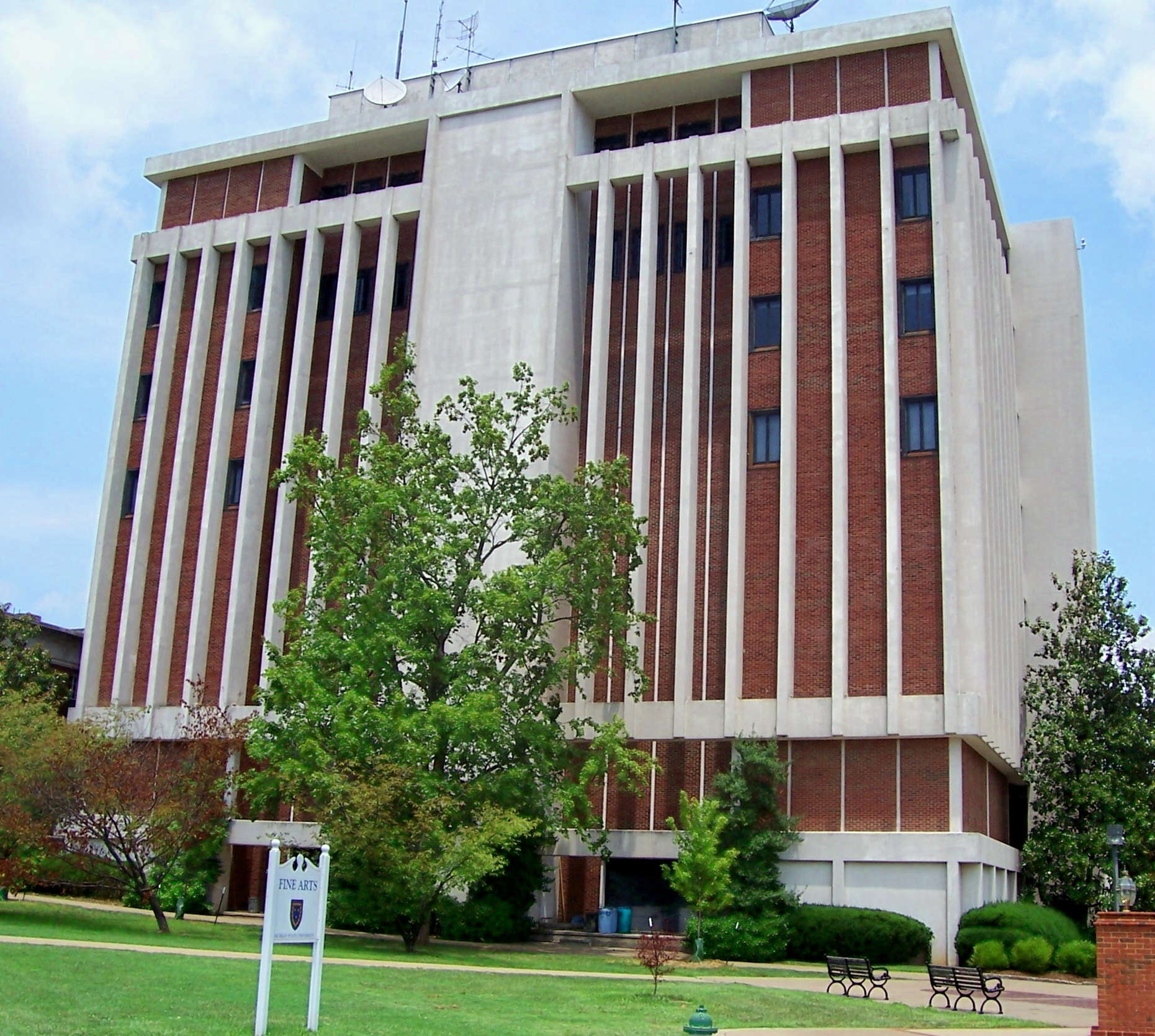
The Clara M. Eagle Gallery is located in the Fine Arts Building.

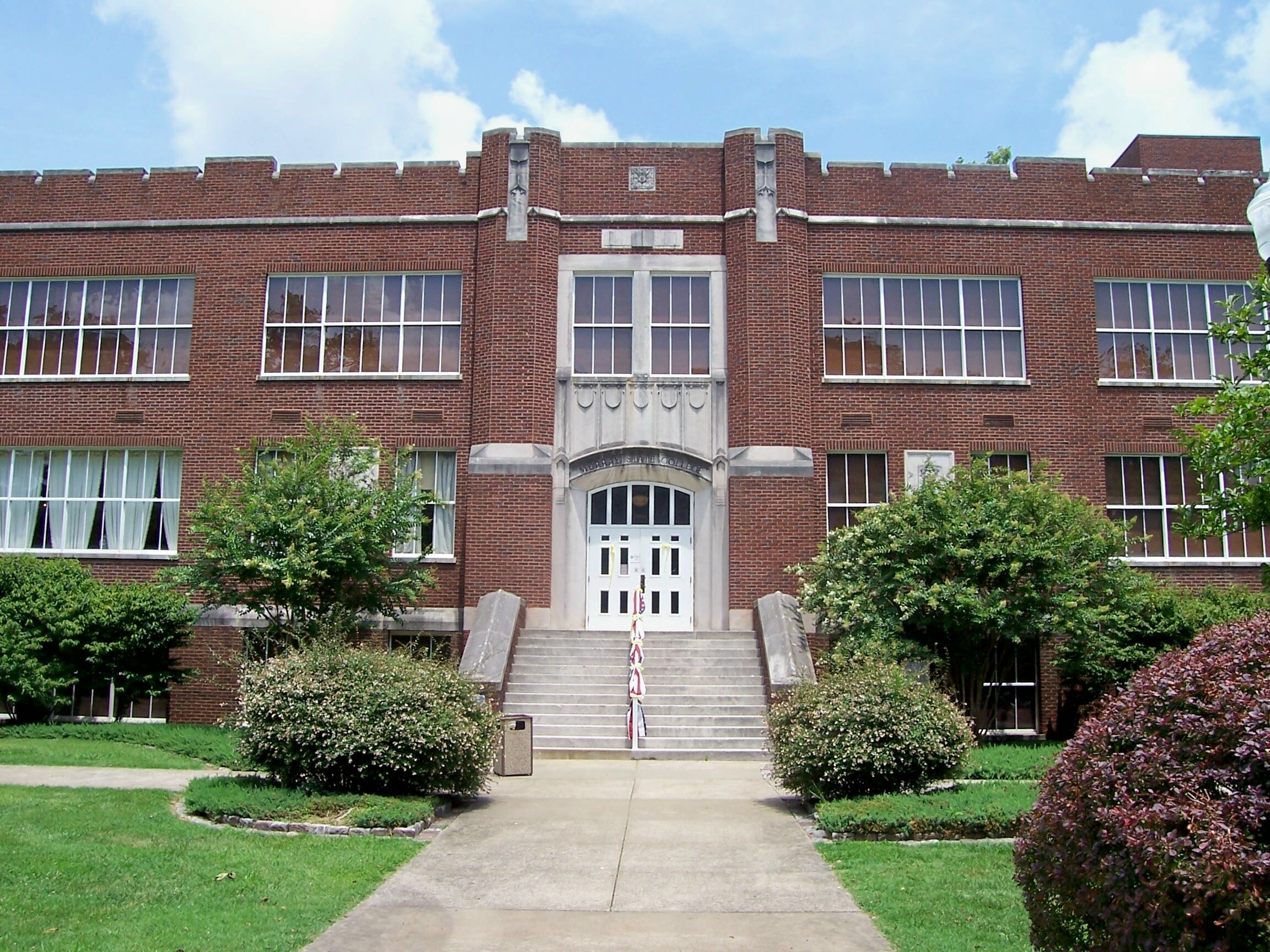
Wrather West Kentucky Museum

The Clara M. Eagle Gallery is a multi-level art gallery that houses around 1,200 permanent artworks. The gallery has also been home to temporary shows, featuring contemporary art, African art, woodworking, and tapestries from Spain. The galleries have about 8,300 square feet (770 m^{2}) of show space.

The Wrather West Kentucky Museum is located in the first building constructed on the campus of Murray State University and has been placed on the National Register of Historic Places. The museum, which is free to the public, highlights the social development, economic and cultural development of the people of the Jackson Purchase region of Kentucky through permanent and changing exhibits.

=== Parks ===
Murray has three city parks that cover over 200 acres (0.8 km^{2}) of land: Central Park, Chestnut Park, and Bee Creek. A three-pool community swimming complex and Owens Spray Park are housed in Murray's Central Park. The parks feature 17 soccer fields, two basketball courts, five playgrounds, nine baseball and softball fields, four-bay batting cages, Lions Club Skate Park, and a three-mile (5 km) nature walking trail. The parks have nine covered picnic pavilions for family gatherings, the Murray Rotary amphitheater and west Kentucky's first dog park. The park features an 18-hole 5,200-foot (1,580 m) disc golf course that was the first one of its kind in the area.

=== Playhouse in the Park ===
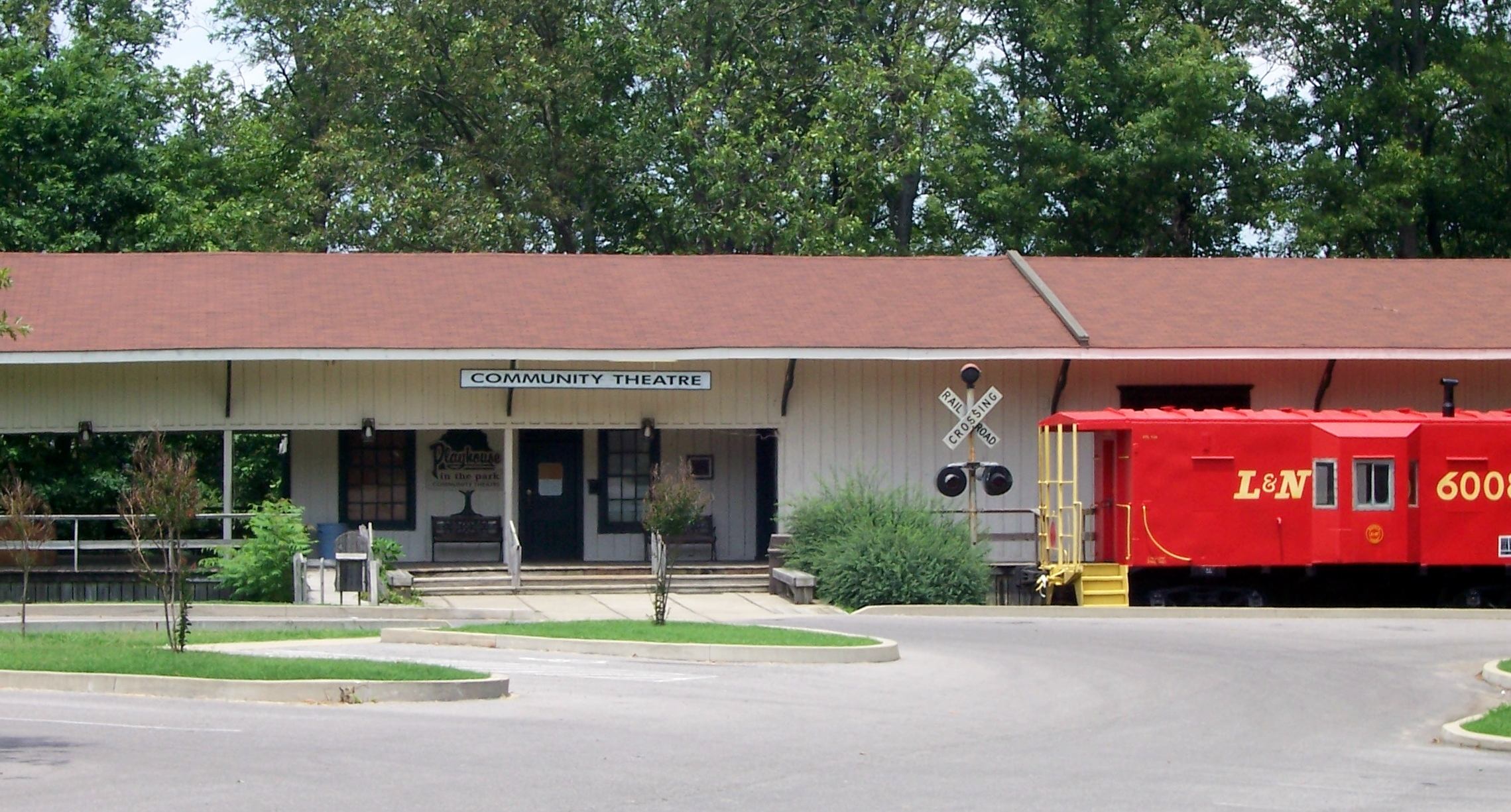
Playhouse in the Park community theatre

Playhouse in the Park is one of the oldest community theatres in the state of Kentucky. The theatre is located in Murray's Central Park and is housed in a 1907 train and freight depot. The playhouse is open year-round and produces original works, comedies, dramas, children's theatre, and musicals. On May 16, 2008, former President Bill Clinton made an appearance at Playhouse in the Park to speak about his wife Hillary Clinton's presidency campaign.

=== Sports ===
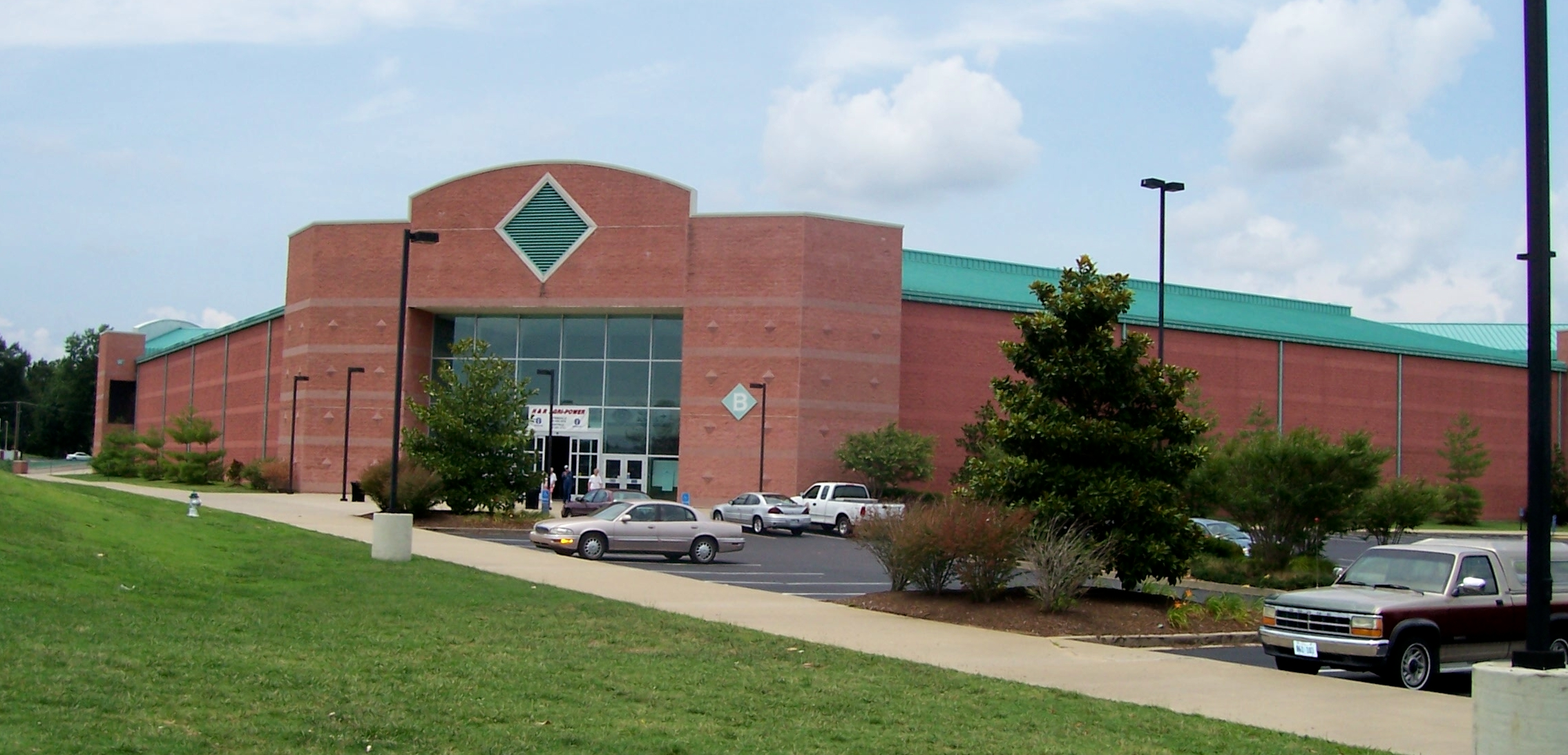
Murray's CFSB Center, home of the Murray State University men's and women's basketball programs

College athletics are the sporting events of choice in the Murray area. Murray State University participates in NCAA Division I athletics, the highest level of collegiate athletics. The university has 16 athletic programs that compete in the Ohio Valley Conference, and have provided 117 conference titles since 1948. The most popular sport at Murray State is the men's basketball program. It is one of the winningest programs in NCAA history, with over 1,300 wins and an all-time winning percentage of .637, which places Murray State 20th best in NCAA history. Murray State has won 23 regular season Ohio Valley Conference titles and 15 OVC Tournament titles, which is the best in the OVC.

The men's basketball program has produced a number of NBA players, most notably Ja Morant, Jeff Martin, Popeye Jones, Isaiah Canaan, Cameron Payne, and Joe Fulks, who is a Basketball Hall of Fame inductee and has been credited with being one of the pioneers of the jump shot. The Murray State men's basketball program is currently coached by Ryan Miller, while past coaches include Steve Prohm, Matt McMahon, Billy Kennedy, and Mick Cronin.

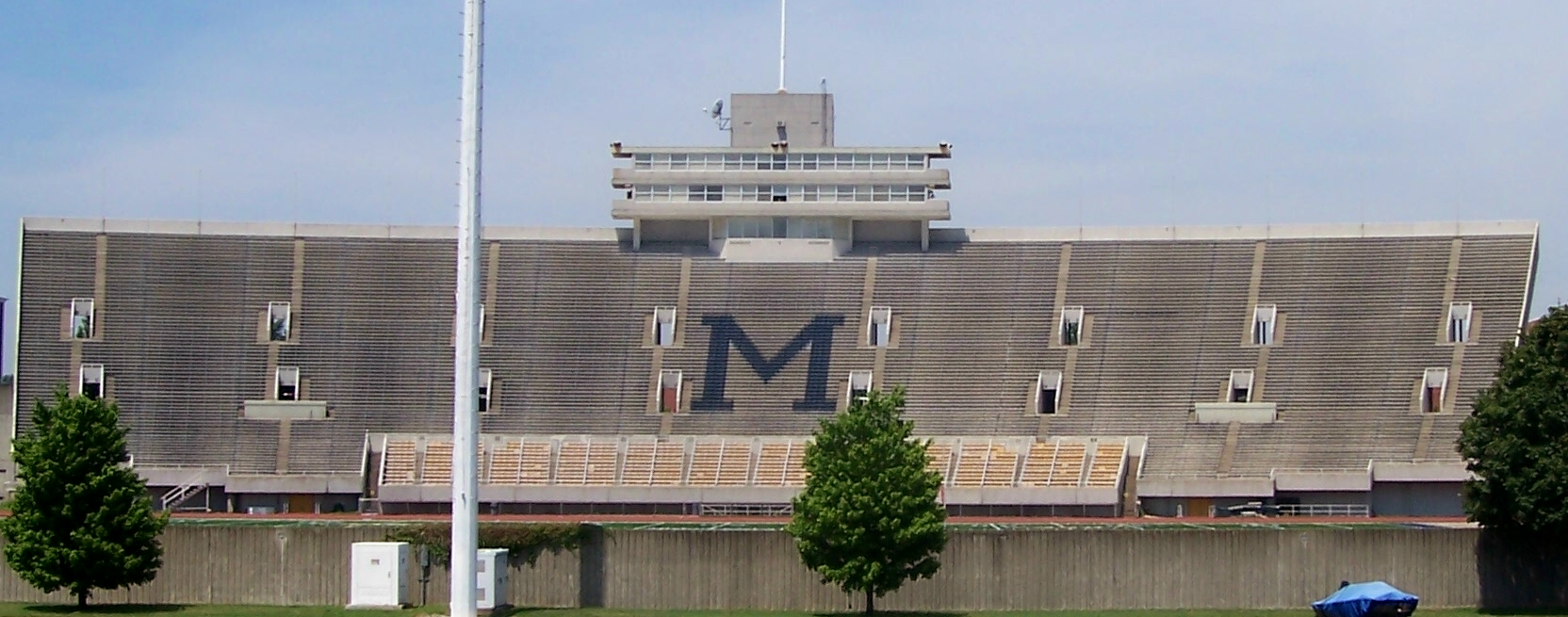
Roy Stewart Stadium, home of the Murray State football program

The Murray State football program has won eight Ohio Valley Conference titles and has produced 17 NFL players. Even more well-known are the coaches the football program has produced. Ralph Friedgen, Frank Beamer, Mike Gottfried, Houston Nutt, and Ron Zook have all had their coaching careers run through the Murray State football program. Ten players have been selected as first team All-Americans, and 21 have been second, third, and honorable mention All-Americans. The Murray State football program has won more than 400 games, the most decisive win coming in 1932 when Murray State beat the University of Louisville 105–0.

=== Cinema ===
Murray has two movie theaters. The Cheri Theater has seven screens and shows nothing but first-run films. The Cheri was started in 1967 as a single-screen theater with seating for 600. There have been many additions and renovations throughout the years, and in 1997, two 290-stadium seat auditoriums were added. In 2008, the theater upgraded its projectors to take advantage of Dolby 3D technology.

The Curris Center Theater hosts Cinema International. The program is run through the department of modern languages at Murray State and is open, free of charge, to students and the public. Cinema International is open most weekends during regular university semesters. Around 18 shows per year showcase film genres by directors around the world.

== Education ==
The Murray Independent School District has been a part of the community since 1872, when the first public school was built in the center of town. Murray's school system has an enrollment of over 1,800 students. There have been 35 National Merit Finalists since 1974. In 2006, the Murray High School test scores were ranked as being 9th in the state of Kentucky. Standard & Poor's recognized the Murray Independent school district as being one of only 18 Kentucky school districts as an outperforming school district. The athletic program competes in Kentucky High School Athletic Association (KHSAA) Class AA in football and class A in cross-country, and track, the only three sports in which the KHSAA divides schools into classes by enrollment. Other sports, most notably basketball, are conducted in a single-class format. The school system also covers numerous extracurricular activities, from band, arts, social clubs, and an academic team.

The Calloway County School District has an enrollment of 3,200 students that are located in Calloway County Preschool, three elementary schools, Calloway County Middle School, and Calloway County High School. The Calloway County Lakers participate in KHSAA sports such as football, basketball, baseball, softball, tennis, wrestling, cross-country, track and field, bass fishing, and trap shooting. Additionally, Calloway County students participate in several extracurricular activities, including state-renowned chapters of academic team, Future Business Leaders of America, FFA, and Robotics. In 2022, Calloway County High School won the state competition in Future Problem Solving, while in 2023, Calloway County Middle School placed second in the state in Quick Recall, a buzzer-style competition within academic team.

Students from both Murray High School and Calloway County High School can attend the Murray/Calloway County Area Technology Center, where students can take classes in automotive technology, carpentry, culinary arts, electrical skills, machine tool technology, nursing, and welding.

=== Higher education ===
Murray is the home of Murray State University, a four-year public university. It was founded in 1922 as the Murray Normal School. The university today offers 11 associate, 64 bachelor, and 42 master's programs, and has an enrollment of over 10,000 students. Murray State University is led by President Dr. Ron K. Patterson.

=== Public library ===
Murray has a lending library, the Calloway County Public Library.

== Media ==
The only daily newspaper in the city of Murray is the Murray Ledger & Times. The Ledger was established in 1879 and has remained locally operated. It is printed six days per week and has a city/county circulation of around 7,200 papers per day. The Ledger also has many out-of-city readers who receive it via mail. The Murray State News is a weekly, award-winning student-produced newspaper that has become popular not only with students, but with other citizens of Murray. The paper features everything from campus news, sports, activities, and opinions.

There are four radio stations with buildings in Murray, although the city can receive 25 different FM signals.

Murray has one television station: WKMU 21, the local transmitter for the statewide KET public television network. Other major network stations available in Murray are:

- WSIL 3 – Harrisburg, ABC
- WPSD 6 – Paducah, NBC
- KBSI 23 – Cape Girardeau, FOX

== Infrastructure ==
=== Transportation ===
==== Roads ====
- US 641, locally known as 12th Street, is the main highway in and out of the city. It connects with Interstate 69 to the north, and Interstate 40 to the south. The four-lane US 641 north of Murray is heavily traveled and can see well over 25,000 cars per day within Murray. Currently, US 641 from the south of Murray is a two-lane highway until it reaches the Tennessee state line. However, the Kentucky Transportation Cabinet has made plans in its six-year highway plan to widen the highway to four lanes. The current two-lane version has become too saturated, due to the high number of citizens of Tennessee who come to Murray to save on sales tax and the large number of Murray residents who had to travel to Tennessee to buy packaged alcohol before the city voted fully wet in July 2012.
- Kentucky 80 is the newest divided highway. The highway links Columbus, Kentucky, to the Virginia border and passes just north of Murray. The highway is expected to increase tourism and industry in the Murray area.
- Kentucky 94, locally known as Main Street, is the main east–west road that runs directly through Murray. It connects to U.S. 45 in the west at Water Valley, and to Kentucky 80 in the east near Aurora.
- Kentucky 121, locally known as 4th Street, is another highway that runs through Murray. It connects to Kentucky 80 in the west and Tennessee 119 at the Tennessee border in the east.

Other road projects in Murray are to include the widening of Kentucky 121 through the city of Murray. Over 12,000 cars travel that stretch of road per day. There are also a downtown loop and four-lane bypass in the works to help relieve traffic congestion within the city.

==== Airport ====
The airport in Murray is the Murray-Calloway County Airport. The airport, known as Kyle-Oakley Field, is a general aviation airport that features a 24-hour terminal and has a runway dimension of 6,200'x 100' and can handle up to a 60,000 lb (27,000 kg) dual-wheel aircraft. The IATA airport code for Kyle-Oakley Field is CEY.

==== MCTA ====
The Murray Calloway Transit Authority recently started the "Racer Routes" service which provides four public bus routes throughout Murray. It also has services for those who do not have a vehicle.

==== Rail ====
The KWT Railway starts one mile (1.6 km) north of Murray and travels south to Bruceton, Tennessee, where it connects with CSX railway that travels to Memphis and beyond.

=== Utilities ===
Electric service in the city of Murray is provided by the Murray Electric System. The electric system is locally owned and governed and gets all of its energy from the Tennessee Valley Authority. In turn, electric customers in Murray enjoy one of the lowest electric rates in the United States. The cost is around 7.2 cents per kilowatt hour. In recent years, MES has branched out into telecommunications. It offers internet service with speeds of up to 12 Mbit/s, home telephone service, and digital cable television service.

Natural gas and water service falls under the city of Murray's Public Works department. The natural gas service has roughly 5,500 customers, in which 1,300,000 cubic feet (37,000 m^{3}) is used per year. The water system treats 1.3 billion gallons of water per year going through 105 miles (169 km) of water main piping. The current treatment plant was built in 1992 with a capacity of 7 million gallons per day. At current, the plant treats 3.6 million gallons per day. The Murray sewer treatment plant treats 4 million gallons of sewage per day and is connected with 122 miles (196 km) of sanitary sewer piping.

== Notable people ==
- Timothy D. Adams, former United States Undersecretary of the Treasury for International Affairs; former Chief of Staff, United States Secretary of the Treasury; current President and CEO, Institute of International Finance (IIF)
- Shane Andrus, football player
- Leigh-Allyn Baker, actress
- Cleanth Brooks, literary critic
- W. Earl Brown, actor
- Joe Buck, musician
- Robert Emmett Beckham, Mayor of Fort Worth, Texas
- Gordon Cooper, astronaut
- Jerry Crutchfield, country and music producer
- Rod Ferrell, murderer
- S.G. Goodman, singer-songwriter
- Gene Graham, recipient of Pulitzer Prize for National Reporting in 1962
- Dustin Howard, professional wrestler, known under the ring name Chuck Taylor
- T. R. M. Howard, surgeon, civil rights leader, and entrepreneur
- Rebbie Jackson, singer, eldest sibling of Michael Jackson
- Billy Lane Lauffer, Medal of Honor recipient
- Ora Kress Mason, nurse and physician who founded and owned Mason Memorial Hospital
- Tim Masthay, football player
- Edward Craig Morris, curator, American Museum of Natural History
- Seth Morrison, skier
- Forrest Pogue, historian
- Mel Purcell, professional tennis player
- Molly Sims, model and actress
- Nathan B. Stubblefield, inventor
- Hawk Taylor, baseball player
- Chris Thile, mandolinist, singer, and songwriter, and host of Live from Here
