= Murray Independent School District =

School district in Kentucky, United States

Location
- Murray, Kentucky 42071 United States

District information
- Type: Public
- Established: 1872
- Superintendent: Coy Samons
- Budget: $26 million (2020-2021)

Students and staff
- Students: ~1,450
- Teachers: ~125

Other information
- Website: www.murray.kyschools.us

Murray Independent School District is a school district in the U.S. city of Murray, Kentucky. The word "independent" denotes that it is separate from any district operated by a county—in this case, Calloway County, of which Murray is the largest city and county seat. It enrolls students from kindergarten through the twelfth grade. In 2020 MISD's school board approved a new budget of $26 million for the 2020–2021 school year.

== Schools ==
- Murray High School (Grades 9–12)
- Murray Middle School (Grades 4–8)
- Murray Elementary School (Grades K-3)

== Murray High School ==
Murray High School is located at 1800 Sycamore Street in Murray, KY. It is organized by department, and school days are structured into seven periods. In each department there may be integrated, accelerated, and advanced placement classes. There are a variety of extracurricular activities, and participation is encouraged.

Students are required to earn a minimum of 22 credits for graduation. These must include four credits of English, four credits of mathematics (including algebra and geometry), three credits of science, three credits of history, one credit of physical education, and one credit of visual/performing arts. Students can elect to earn the Kentucky Commonwealth Diploma, which is a more comprehensive diploma as it requires the student to take four classes for college credit (AP classes).

== Murray Middle School ==
Murray Middle School is located at 801 Main Street in Murray, and is where the original building of the district was located.

== Murray Elementary School ==
Murray Elementary School is located 111 S Broach Avenue in Murray KY.
