= East Bernstadt Independent School District =

School district in Kentucky, United States

Address
- 296 East Highway 3094 East Bernstadt, Kentucky, Kentucky, 40729; United States
- Coordinates: 37°11′23.4″N 84°06′49.0″W

District information
- Type: Public
- Grades: PreK–8
- Superintendent: Vicki Jones
- NCES District ID: 2101590

Students and staff
- Students: 534 (2021–22)
- Teachers: 35.00 (FTE) (2021–22)
- Staff: 29.00 (2021–22)
- Student–teacher ratio: 14.37 (2021–22)

Other information
- Website: e-bernstadt.k12.ky.us

East Bernstadt Independent School District is a school district in East Bernstadt, Kentucky. It operates a K-8 school. Its divisions are East Bernstadt Elementary School and East Bernstadt Middle School. Vicki Jones is the district Superintendent.

Of the state's current 51 independent school districts, roughly defined by state law as those whose service area does not cover most or all of a county, East Bernstadt is one of four that do not operate a high school, the others being Anchorage in Jefferson County, Science Hill in Pulaski County, and Southgate in Campbell County.

== Post-elementary arrangements ==
East Bernstadt students graduate to the Laurel County Public Schools district, with students allowed to attend either of that district's two high schools, North Laurel and South Laurel. The East Bernstadt district is closer to North Laurel.

== See also ==
- Laurel County Public Schools - the other school district in the county
