= South Oldham High School =

School in Crestwood, Kentucky, United States

Location
- 5901 Veterans Memorial Parkway; Crestwood, KY 40014; 38.3319°N 85.469°W

Information
- Motto: Where Greatness Continues
- School district: Oldham County Schools
- Principal: Melissa Woosley
- Teaching staff: 61.00 (on an FTE basis)
- Grades: 9-12
- Enrollment: 1,267 (2023–2024)
- Student to teacher ratio: 20.77
- Colors: Forest green, navy blue, grey
- Nickname: Dragons
- Website: www.oldham.kyschools.us/sohs/

South Oldham High School is located in Crestwood, Kentucky and serves pupils in 9th-12th grade. The school's mascot is the Dragon, which is green to reflect the school colors of green and gray, as well as navy and white for accent colors. South Oldham opened in 1989 because Oldham County High School had become overcrowded.

== Awards ==
In 2008, The Draconium, the student-run yearbook, and The Dragon's Tale, the student-run newspaper, have won numerous Kentucky High School Journalism Association (KHSJA) awards.

== Athletics ==
The girls' soccer team has won 8 (1995, 1996, 1998, 1999, 2000, 2001, 2014, and 2022) Kentucky High School Athletic Association (KHSAA) championships. The boys' cross country team won the 1993 (AA), 2000 (AAA), 2009 (AA), and 2014 (AAA) KHSAA team championship. The girls' cross country team won the 2008, 2009, 2010, and 2011 KHSAA AA team championships.

== Notable alumni ==
- Eric Quigley, Professional Tennis Player
