= Newport Independent Schools =

School district in Kentucky, United States

Address
- 301 East 8th Street Newport, Kentucky, 41071; United States

District information
- Grades: Pre-school - 12
- Established: 1847; 179 years ago
- Superintendent: Kelly Middleton
- NCES District ID: 2104440

Students and staff
- Enrollment: 1,669
- Staff: 146.14 (on an FTE basis)
- Student–teacher ratio: 9.30

Other information
- Website: www.newportwildcats.org

The Newport Independent School District is a public school district in Campbell County, based in Newport, Kentucky. It was established in 1847.

== Schools ==
The Newport Independent School District has one primary school, one intermediate school, one middle school, and one high school.
