= Southgate Independent Schools =

School district in Kentucky, United States

Southgate Independent Schools is a school district located in Southgate, Campbell County, Kentucky. It is one of four Kentucky school districts that does not operate a high school, only serving students through eighth grade.

The Southgate district has reciprocal agreements with multiple Northern Kentucky districts to allow its students to attend high school in those districts. A 2015 report by the Legislative Research Commission, the research arm of the Kentucky General Assembly, indicated that a majority of Southgate high school students then attended Highlands High School in the Fort Thomas district, and a large minority attended Newport High School in that city's district. Other students attended schools in the Bellevue and Ludlow independent districts, as well as the Boone, Campbell, and Kenton county districts. In all cases, parents were responsible for paying any required tuition.
