= Oldham County Schools =

School district in Kentucky, US

Oldham County Schools is a school district serving Oldham County, Kentucky.

Anchorage Independent School District district residents may attend Oldham County Schools for high school. The other choice is Jefferson County Public Schools (JCPS).

== Schools ==
=== Elementary schools ===
- Buckner Elementary School
- Camden Station Elementary School
- Centerfield Elementary School
- Crestwood Elementary School
- Goshen Elementary School
- Harmony Elementary
- Kenwood Station Elementary School
- LaGrange Elementary School
- Locust Grove Elementary School

=== Middle schools ===
- East Oldham Middle School
- North Oldham Middle School
- Oldham County Middle School
- South Oldham Middle School

=== High schools ===
- North Oldham High School
- Oldham County High School
- South Oldham High School

=== Additional programs ===
- Buckner Alternative High School
- Oldham County Preschool
- Oldham County Schools Arts Center
- Arvin Education Center
- Creative and Performing Arts Academy (CAPAA)
