= Laurel County Public Schools =

School district in Kentucky, USA

Coordinates: 37°07′57.5″N 84°05′14.8″W

Location
- 718 North Main Street Laurel County London, Kentucky, 40741; United States

District information
- Established: 1840
- Superintendent: Denise Griebel

Laurel County Public Schools is a school district headquartered in London, Kentucky. It is one of two districts serving Laurel County alongside East Bernstadt Independent School District, and is the only one of the two to operate high schools.

The district was established in 1840.

The Superintendent for the school district is Denise Griebel.

Elected board members are Ed Jones, Jeff Lewis, Charles “Bud” Stuber, John Begley, and Philip Bundy, DVM

== Schools ==
High schools

- North Laurel High School
- South Laurel High School
- Laurel County Center for Innovation

Middle schools

- North Laurel Middle School
- South Laurel Middle School

Primary schools

- Bush Elementary School
- Camp Ground Elementary School
- Cold Hill Elementary School
- Colony Elementary School
- Hazel Green Elementary School
- Hunter Hills Elementary School
- Johnson Elementary School
- Keavy Elementary School
- London Elementary School
- Sublimity Elementary School
- Wyan-Pine Elementary School

Alternative schools

- Laurel County Day Treatment
- McDaniel Learning Center

== See also ==
- East Bernstadt Independent School District - The other school district in the county, which serves only K–8 students.
