= Buckner, Kentucky =

Census-designated place in Kentucky, United States

- CDP
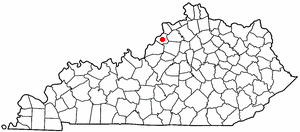
- Location of Buckner, Kentucky
- Coordinates: 38°23′25″N 85°27′13″W
- Country: United States
- State: Kentucky
- County: Oldham

Area
  - Total: 8.81 sq mi (22.83 km^{2})
  - Land: 8.64 sq mi (22.37 km^{2})
  - Water: 0.18 sq mi (0.46 km^{2})
- Elevation: 761 ft (232 m)

Population (2020)
  - Total: 5,837
  - Density: 669.7/sq mi (258.59/km^{2})
- Time zone: UTC-5 (Eastern (EST))
  - Summer (DST): UTC-4 (EDT)
- ZIP code: 40010
- Area code: 502
- FIPS code: 21-10648
- GNIS feature ID: 2402727

Buckner is a census-designated place (CDP) in Oldham County, Kentucky, United States. The population was 5,837 at the 2020 census.

Oldham County High School is located in Buckner. The town and the school were hit by an EF2 tornado on April 2, 2024.

== Geography ==
According to the United States Census Bureau, the CDP has a total area of 7.5 square miles (19 km^{2}), of which 7.4 square miles (19 km^{2}) is land and 0.2 square miles (0.52 km^{2}) (2.00%) is water.

== History ==
=== Founding and early history ===
Buckner's history began in the early 1800s when settlers arrived through Old Brownsboro Road and established a settlement that was named "La Fayetteville." In 1820 early settler William P. Rodman sold 120 acres to Mitchell Overstreet, who opened a general store and a small village. By 1826, La Fayetteville had a blacksmith, general store, tavern, church, and sawmill. The town campaigned to be the county seat but lost to La Grange. By 1880, "Buckner Station," named for the Buckner family, was shortened to "Buckner." In 1874, it was populated by 250 residents with a steam sawmill, two distilleries, two churches, and a seminary. John George Klein, an immigrant from Germany, opened the first commercial winery in Oldham County at Buckner in 1886.

The Louisville & Eastern Electric Railroad was brought to Oldham County in the early 1900s, from Crestwood to Buckner and on to La Grange by 1906. The line was a commuter railroad featuring livestock cars and baggage cars transporting milk and cream. A court battle and final agreement over land rights in Buckner with the L&N Railroad allowed the extension of the Electric Railroad. Education also changed with Buckner, as there was an early school on the west side of Cedar Point Road, then a two-story brick school built at the site of the present Oldham County High School.

Buckner resident J.T. Clifton remembers his boyhood when the interurban streetcar from Louisville to La Grange would make frequent stops. His family operated a dairy near what is now the industrial park at KY 146 and I-71. Clifton saw a number of changes, including the replacement of oil lamps by carbide lights and the paving of KY 146 in 1929. At one time Buckner boasted three general stores and one of the county's oldest post offices, run by Sam Leet. The Clifton place, with a house built sometime between 1875 and 1900, featured an old wine cellar converted to use as a smokehouse. Clifton also remembers "hobos" stopping for food and milk and adventures driving to Louisville for oysters and entertainment. Lumber from the L&N depot was repurposed for a house still standing on KY 146 in La Grange.

=== Modern history ===
Shaw's Grocery, a small, family-run general store, was a pillar of the neighborhood for many years. In addition to offering groceries and other necessities for the home in a welcoming, individualized environment, it functioned as a hub for residents. Shaw's Grocery closed despite its success as bigger chain stores appeared nearby, indicating shifts in the local economy. Although the store's closure signaled the end of an era, many longtime Buckner residents still have pleasant memories of it.

Another existing business in Buckner, Torbitt & Castleman, maker of syrups and barbecue sauce, has again expanded its facilities with a new 17,000 square foot building that will bring in six new jobs as most of the work will be done by automation.

Of course, Buckner is also home to such manufacturers and business concerns as U.S. Housing Components, the Rigo Co., Catalyst Technology, East & Westbrook and a number of smaller businesses.

Buckner has two industrial parks: one owned by Torbitt & Castleman, and the other across the railroad tracks, closer to Interstate 71.

One of Buckner's biggest claims to fame is the John Black Community Center, Aquatic Center, and the Lost World Playground. The playground, designed by children in Oldham County, was built in 2003 by volunteers from the community to help give kids in the area a new space to play.

In 2022, the Oldham County Aquatic Center pool closed for a massive renovation. It reopened on Memorial Day weekend 2024.

On November 1, 2024, a new 100,000-square-foot Kroger grocery store opened in Buckner, just off of I-71 on Highway 393. The $35 million facility features a drive-thru pharmacy, Little Clinic, Starbucks, and a fuel center. The centerpiece inside is an 8' tall community mural by Louisville artist Amie Villiger Harris honoring Yew Dell Gardens, Kentucky's state bird-the Cardinal-and state flower-the Goldenrod. This is the first Kroger to open in Buckner; the nearest one to date has been in La Grange.

== Demographics ==
Historical population
Census	Pop.	Note	%±
2000	4,000		—
2020	5,785		—
U.S. Decennial Census

=== 2020 census ===
As of the 2020 census, Buckner had a population of 5,785. The median age was 40.2 years. 19.2% of residents were under the age of 18 and 9.8% of residents were 65 years of age or older. For every 100 females there were 217.7 males, and for every 100 females age 18 and over there were 271.8 males age 18 and over.

92.4% of residents lived in urban areas, while 7.6% lived in rural areas.

There were 1,092 households in Buckner, of which 48.3% had children under the age of 18 living in them. Of all households, 79.2% were married-couple households, 6.8% were households with a male householder and no spouse or partner present, and 12.2% were households with a female householder and no spouse or partner present. About 10.3% of all households were made up of individuals and 5.6% had someone living alone who was 65 years of age or older.

There were 1,129 housing units, of which 3.3% were vacant. The homeowner vacancy rate was 0.6% and the rental vacancy rate was 4.2%.

Racial composition as of the 2020 census
Race	Number	Percent
White	4,786	82.7%
Black or African American	528	9.1%
American Indian and Alaska Native	4	0.1%
Asian	32	0.6%
Native Hawaiian and Other Pacific Islander	1	0.0%
Some other race	88	1.5%
Two or more races	346	6.0%
Hispanic or Latino (of any race)	288	5.0%

=== Demographic estimates ===
The median value of owner occupied housing units is $350,600, with a median monthly mortgage payment of $2,190 from 2018–2022. 90.4% of Buckner residents aged 1+ year lived in the same house 1 year ago. 99.6% of households had a broadband Internet subscription from 2018–2022.

=== Income, education, and employment ===
Buckner has a median household income of $148,538. 54.2% of Buckner residents have a bachelor's degree or higher. Buckner has a 70.9% employment rate. The average travel time to work in minutes in Buckner is 27.6.

== Education ==
Buckner is in the Oldham County School District. It operates Oldham County High School.
