= Bands of America =

Marching band competition organization

- Logo (1983–present)

- Abbreviation: BOA
- Formation: 1975; 51 years ago
- Founder: Larry McCormick
- Merger of: Bands of America, Inc.; Music for All Foundation
- Type: Performing arts organization
- Legal status: 501(c)(3) organization
- Purpose: To create, provide and expand positively life-changing experiences through music for all.
- Location: Indianapolis, Indiana
- Region served: United States
- Chief Judge: Richard Saucedo, Nola Jones, John Phillips
- Advisory Committee Chairman: Ken Snoeck
- Parent organization: Music For All (MFA)
- Website: marching.musicforall.org; bands.org (former)
- Formerly called: Marching Bands of America (1975–1984); Bands of America, Inc. (1984–2006)

Bands of America (BOA) is a music education advocacy organization and promoter of high school marching band competitions in the United States. Established in 1975 as Marching Bands of America (MBA), founder Larry McCormick's goal was to provide educational opportunities for music students nationwide. McCormick organized the first annual Summer Workshop and Festival in 1976. Renamed Bands of America in 1984, the organization became an independent, tax-exempt entity in 1988. In 2006, Bands of America merged with the Music for All Foundation, a music education advocacy organization, becoming the flagship program of the combined organization. Bands of America has received numerous awards from IFEA.

Marching Bands of America / Bands of America has conducted high school marching band contests including a national competition—called the "Grand National" championship—in every year since 1976 (except 2020, when all previously announced BOA competitions, including the Grand National Championship, originally scheduled for November 12–14, were cancelled in response to the coronavirus pandemic). Since 1980, these events are conducted between September and November, culminating in the Grand Nationals, which have been held since 1989 in Indianapolis, Indiana and since 2008 specifically at Lucas Oil Stadium. From 1980 to 1989, Bands of America also hosted an annual Summer National Championship.

Since 1975, Bands of America's various programs, services and events have served approximately 1.75 million music students. Approximately 450,000 spectators attend Bands of America championships every year. The adjudication manual and contest procedures utilized by Bands of America have been licensed to or adopted by other organizations. As a result, Bands of America sets standards for adjudication and competitive attributes of marching band competitions throughout the United States.

The Bands of America Honor Band will participate in the 2026 Rose Parade on New Year's Day in Pasadena, California.

== History ==
Larry McCormick established Marching Bands of America in 1975 as a subsidiary of McCormick's Enterprises, a music education supplies company. The goal was to provide a unique education and performance opportunity for music students nationwide. In 1976, Marching Bands of America hosted the first annual Summer Workshop and Festival on the campus of University of Wisconsin–Whitewater. Included in the program was the first Grand National Championship, whose inaugural champions were Kosciusko (Mississippi) and Live Oak (California) high schools. From 1980 onward, Grand National Championships were hosted in November. The Summer Workshop and Festival was relaunched as the Summer National Championships, which continued until 1989.

In 1983, Marching Bands of America was spun-off by McCormick's as Bands of America, Inc. L. Scott McCormick, son of founder Larry McCormick, was named CEO of the new Bands of America in 1985. In 1988, Bands of America was awarded tax-exempt status, retroactive to 1984. The Student Leadership Workshop began as part of the Summer Workshop and Festival in 1988, which was relaunched as the annual Summer Symposium in 1990. In 1992, the Summer Band Symposium became a resident program at Illinois State University. The symposium has since been hosted at Ball State University.

Bands of America began a recurring program of honor ensembles in 1992. The Honor Band of America's first performance was at the 1992 National Concert Band Festival established by Bands of America to rekindle the "concert band tradition in America as exemplified by the National Band Contest in the 1930s." The Honor Orchestra of America premiered at the National Concert Band Festival in 2005, launching the Orchestra of America program.

In 2006, Bands of America merged with the Music for All Foundation, a music education advocacy organization. Bands of America became a subsidiary of Music For All, and its flagship program, with L. Scott McCormick becoming the combined organization's CEO. Other programs operated by Bands of America, such as Orchestra and Honor Band of America, have been operated directly by Music for All since 2007.

Yamaha Corporation has been a corporate sponsor and presenting partner of Bands of America since 2003.

=== IFEA recognition ===
From 1989 to 2006, Bands of America was recognized by the International Festivals and Events Association (IFEA) for excellence in promotional materials design and television production:

- 1989 – Special recognition for the design of promotional materials.
- 1990 – Two Gold Medals for print materials and promotional artwork.
- 1993 – Three Gold Medals for newsletter and program book design.
- 1994 – Four awards for newsletter and program book design.
- 1995 – Gold Medal for newsletter design.
- 1996 – Bronze Medal for website design, the former bands.org.
- 1997 – Silver Medal for newsletter design.
- 1998 – Gold Medal for Best Television Program for Grand National Championship production.
- 1999 – Best Fundraising Program award for Grand National pin program.
- 2000 – Four medals:
  - Silver Medal for Best Newsletter.
  - Bronze Medal for Best Website.
  - Bronze Medal for Best Sponsor Solicitation Video Production.
  - Bronze Medal for Best Television Production for Grand National Championship production.
- 2001 – Silver Medal for Best Newsletter and Gold Medal for Best Sponsorship Video.
- 2002 – Recognition with three Pinnacle Awards for promotional materials design and event promotion.
- 2006 – Recognition with seven Pinnacle Awards for promotional materials design, television production, and event promotion.

== Championship system ==
All Bands of America championship events are open to all high school bands based in the United States on a first-come, first-served basis. There are no qualifications or prerequisites for participation. However, the Bands of America system is highly competitive. Bands receive a score which determines class rank and placement. Announcements place more emphasis on rankings between bands, such as advancing to the final round, versus a score. Promotional materials and programs often include essays on education philosophy and pedagogy from prominent music educators which highlight the festival atmosphere of each championship event, as well as exploring concepts such as the pursuit of excellence, and individual growth and achievement through competition. Spectators are encouraged to give each band participating in the final round a standing ovation.

Many bands have competed at championship events every year since 1978, such as Marian Catholic High School. Approximately 450,000 music students and their families, music educators, and spectators attend Bands of America championships every year.

=== Regional championships ===
The regional championship program began in 1978 with events in Harrisonburg, Virginia and Jackson, Mississippi. Regionals are single-day events limited to a maximum of 32 bands in preliminary competition, with the ten highest scoring bands advancing to a final round. Regionals attract bands from the surrounding area, with many bands competing in more than one regional every year.

All 2020 Regional Championships were cancelled on July 21, 2020.

=== Super Regional championships ===
In 2003, the San Antonio Regional was relaunched as a Super Regional Championship, a two-day event which included a national caliber adjudication panel, a maximum of 84 bands, with the fourteen highest scoring bands advancing to a final round. According to FloMarching, the caliber of bands at the San Antonio Super Regional is second only to Grand Nationals.

All 2020 Super Regional Championships were cancelled on July 21, 2020.

==== Past Super Regional venues ====
The St. Louis and Atlanta Regional Championships were relaunched as Super Regionals in 2004. The Indiana Regional was relaunched as a Super Regional in 2011. The Alamodome is also site of the annual Texas state marching championship hosted by the University Interscholastic League, and Lucas Oil Stadium is also the site of the annual Indiana State School Music Association marching band championships. The Atlanta Super Regional Championship ended in 2017.

2003	2004–2010	2011–2017	2018–present (Note: 2020 Grand National, Super Regional, and Regional Championships were cancelled due to the coronavirus pandemic)
Alamodome; San Antonio, Texas
	The Dome at America's Center (Edward Jones Dome, 2004–2016); St. Louis, Missouri		
	Georgia Dome (Mercedes-Benz Stadium, 2017); Atlanta, Georgia		
		Lucas Oil Stadium; Indianapolis, Indiana	

=== Grand National championships ===
The Grand National championships are open to all high school bands. There are no qualifications or prerequisites for participation; a standard established by Larry McCormick at the first Summer Workshop and Festival in 1976. The format and terms for advancing to the semifinal and final competitions have changed since its inception.

As of 2024, Grand Nationals are open to as many as 112 bands, with performances taking place over three days. All bands participate in a preliminary competition, split between two rounds. The highest scoring bands from each preliminary advance to a semifinal competition, and the twelve highest scoring bands advance to the final round. Class champions (A, AA, AAA, and AAAA) are announced following the semifinal, and the Grand National Champion is announced after the final.

The 2020 Grand National Championships were cancelled on July 21, 2020, due to the COVID-19 pandemic. The Championships returned to a normal schedule in 2021.

==== Championship trophy ====
The Grand National Champion receives the traveling championship trophy for one year. The trophy's base includes plaques for all previous champions, excluding the Summer National Champions. The trophy is capped by a white enameled eagle which was installed in 1995. A common phrase heard during the championship weekend is "who will take home the eagle?" Bands that have received the trophy have nicknamed the eagle 'Kevin.' (Note: Based on threads from the former Bands of America student forums.)

==== Past National venues ====
From 1976 to 1979, Grand National Championships occurred in June. From 1980 onward, championships occurred in November. The June event was relaunched as the Summer National Championship which continued until 1989.

Year	Grand National Championships	Year	Summer National Championships
1976–1979	Warhawk Stadium; University of Wisconsin–Whitewater; Whitewater, Wisconsin		
1980	Gator Bowl Stadium; Jacksonville, Florida	1980–1989	Warhawk Stadium; University of Wisconsin–Whitewater; Whitewater, Wisconsin
1981–1983	Memorial Center; East Tennessee State University; Johnson City, Tennessee	1980–1989	Warhawk Stadium; University of Wisconsin–Whitewater; Whitewater, Wisconsin
1984–1986	Hoosier Dome; Indianapolis, Indiana	1980–1989	Warhawk Stadium; University of Wisconsin–Whitewater; Whitewater, Wisconsin
1987–1988	Pontiac Silverdome; Pontiac, Michigan	1980–1989	Warhawk Stadium; University of Wisconsin–Whitewater; Whitewater, Wisconsin
1989–2007	RCA Dome (Hoosier Dome, 1989–1994); Indianapolis, Indiana	1980–1989	Warhawk Stadium; University of Wisconsin–Whitewater; Whitewater, Wisconsin
2008–present	Lucas Oil Stadium; Indianapolis, Indiana		

==== Future Grand National dates ====
Dates for Grand Nationals have been announced up to 2028, with all events scheduled to take place at Lucas Oil Stadium in Indianapolis, Indiana, on the second weekend of November each year."

Date	Venue
Lucas Oil Stadium; Indianapolis, Indiana
Lucas Oil Stadium; Indianapolis, Indiana	November 12 – November 14, 2026
Lucas Oil Stadium; Indianapolis, Indiana	November 11 – November 13, 2027
Lucas Oil Stadium; Indianapolis, Indiana	November 10 – November 12, 2028

== Classification and adjudication ==
=== Available classes ===
Participating bands are assigned to a competitive classes based on their school's enrollment (grades 10 through 12). Classes are used to determine preliminary placements and awards and are not announced to the judges or audience with the intention to not influence scoring. The top twelve highest-scoring bands regardless of class advance to the finals performance. Class champions who do not advance to finals are invited to perform in exhibition. Bands of America attempts to keep the number of competing bands in each class, across the entire championship system, evenly distributed. Classes AA, AAA, and AAAA are realigned every three years based on data provided by participating bands. Class A's requirement of 600 or fewer enrolled students remains unchanged. The next realignment period is scheduled for 2028. The following classes are available as of 2025:

Class	Enrolled students
A	600 or fewer
AA	601 – 1325
AAA	1326 – 1850
AAAA	1851 and above

==== Historic classes ====
Competitive classes available from 1976 to the present. Classes were realigned in 1980, 1986, and in 2009.

Grand Nationals
1976–1979	1980–1985	1986–2009	2009–present
A
Open	AA		
Open	Open	AAA	AAA
Open	Open	AAA	AAAA

Summer Nationals
1980–1985	1986–1989
A
AA
Open (Note: Open Class for high school bands.)	AAA
	Open (Note: Open Class for community bands and drum & bugle corps who met age restrictions.)

=== Adjudication ===
The adjudication system used by Bands of America is a single-tier "criteria reference system, in which a band showing proficiency in particular criteria, or meeting certain criteria at a certain level." Each adjudicator is assigned a specific category, or caption. Judges are assigned a specific area in which he or she focuses - in the press box or on the field. Bands will receive a recorded evaluation and scoresheet from each judge. The system has a strong emphasis on the Music General Effect, which accounts for 40% of the total score, as scores for Individual and Ensemble performance are averaged for both Music and Visual categories. According to the Adjudication Handbook a band's achievement (total score) is based on the content of the performance, as well as the quality of the performance. The Ensemble and Individual Performance scores in each category are averaged.

Category	Performance *	+	Effect	=	Points
Music	Ensemble Performance (20)	+	Music Effect (40)	=	60.00
Music	Individual Performance (20)	+	Music Effect (40)	=	60.00
Visual	Ensemble Performance (20)	+	Visual Effect (20)	=	40.00
Visual	Individual Performance (20)	+	Visual Effect (20)	=	40.00
			Subtotal	=	100.00
			Field & Timing	=	0.00
			Total	=	100.00

The manual and contest procedures utilized by Bands of America have been licensed to or adopted whole, or in part, by other organizations hosting marching band competitions. As a result, Bands of America functions as a de facto governing body who determines the adjudication and competitive attributes of marching band competitions throughout the United States. However, Bands of America is not organized as a governing body. It instead operates almost exclusively as an event promoter, producer, host, and music education advocacy organization. Changes to the attributes of Bands of America championships are made by the Music for All board of directors, who regularly appoint an advisory committee composed of directors from participating bands to provide input on all aspects of Bands of America's programs and events.

== Past champions ==
=== Grand National Championships (1976–present) ===
From 1976 to 1979, Grand National Championships were hosted at the University of Wisconsin–Whitewater in June of each year. In 1980, the Grand National Championships weekend transitioned to November where it has remained since. The class system was realigned in 1980, 1986, and in 2009.

Year	A Class	—	—	Open Class	Champion
1976 (1st)	Kosciusko (Mississippi)			Live Oak (California)	Live Oak (California)
1977 (2nd)	Murray (Kentucky)			Live Oak ^{(2)}	Murray (Kentucky)
1978 (3rd)	Monticello (Illinois)			Live Oak ^{(3)}	Live Oak ^{(2)}
1979 (4th)	Sylva-Webster (North Carolina)			Flushing (Michigan)	Sylva-Webster (North Carolina)
Year	A Class	AA Class	—	Open Class	Champion
1980 (5th)	Hanover (Pennsylvania)	South Cobb (Georgia)		J. M. Tate (Florida)	J. M. Tate (Florida)
1981 (6th)	Danville (Kentucky)	Chesterton (Indiana)		Norwin (Pennsylvania)	Chesterton (Indiana)
1982 (7th)	Danville ^{(2)}	Chesterton ^{(2)}		Norwin ^{(2)}	Norwin (Pennsylvania)
1983 (8th)	Carroll (Ohio)	Rocky Mount (North Carolina)		Ben Davis (Indiana)	Rocky Mount (North Carolina)
1984 (9th)	Western (Indiana)	Rocky Mount ^{(2)}		Norwin ^{(3)}	Rocky Mount ^{(2)}
1985 (10th)	Western ^{(2)}	Marian Catholic (Illinois)		West Genesee (New York)	Marian Catholic (Illinois)
Year	A Class	AA Class	AAA Class	—	Champion
1986 (11th)	Marlington (Ohio)	Marian Catholic ^{(2)}	Rocky Mount (North Carolina)		Rocky Mount ^{(3)}
1987 (12th)	New Philadelphia (Ohio)	Marian Catholic ^{(3)}	Cicero–North Syracuse (New York)		Marian Catholic ^{(2)}
1988 (13th)	Western ^{(3)}	Marian Catholic ^{(4)}	Lake Park (Illinois)		Marian Catholic ^{(3)}
1989 (14th)	New Philadelphia ^{(2)}	Marian Catholic ^{(5)}	Lake Park ^{(2)}		Marian Catholic ^{(4)}
1990 (15th)	Western ^{(4)}	Marian Catholic ^{(6)}	Plymouth-Canton (Michigan)		Plymouth-Canton (Michigan)
1991 (16th)	Academy (Pennsylvania)	Kiski Area (Pennsylvania)	Plymouth-Canton ^{(2)}		Plymouth-Canton ^{(2)}
1992 (17th)	Owen Valley (Indiana)	Marian Catholic ^{(7)}	Plymouth-Canton ^{(3)}		Centerville (Ohio)
1993 (18th)	Jackson Academy (Mississippi)	Marian Catholic ^{(8)}	Spring (Texas)		Spring (Texas)
1994 (19th)	Bellbrook (Ohio)	Kiski Area ^{(2)}	Westerville South (Ohio)		Marian Catholic ^{(5)}
1995 (20th)	Bellbrook ^{(2)}	Marian Catholic ^{(9)}	Westfield (Texas)		Center Grove (Indiana)
1996 (21st)	Northwestern Lehigh (Pennsylvania)	Marian Catholic ^{(10)}	Center Grove (Indiana)		Lake Park (Illinois)
1997 (22nd)	Elizabethtown (Kentucky)	Marian Catholic ^{(11)}	Center Grove ^{(2)}		Marian Catholic ^{(6)}
1998 (23rd)	Bellbrook ^{(3)}	Marian Catholic ^{(12)}	Lassiter (Georgia)		Lassiter (Georgia)
1999 (24th)	Bellbrook ^{(4)}	Reeths-Puffer (Michigan)	Plymouth-Canton ^{(4)}		Plymouth-Canton ^{(3)}
2000 (25th)	Bellbrook ^{(5)}	Tarpon Springs (Florida)	Marian Catholic (Illinois)		Marian Catholic ^{(7)}
2001 (26th)	Bellbrook ^{(6)}	Tarpon Springs ^{(2)}	Carmel (Indiana)		Lawrence Central (Indiana)
2002 (27th)	Norwell (Indiana)	Avon (Indiana)	Lassiter ^{(2)}		Lassiter ^{(2)}
2003 (28th)	Norwell ^{(2)}	Tarpon Springs ^{(3)}	Westfield ^{(2)}		Westfield (Texas)
2004 (29th)	Jackson Academy ^{(2)}	Bellbrook (Ohio)	Kennesaw Mountain (Georgia)		Lawrence Central ^{(2)}
2005 (30th)	Adair County (Kentucky)	Tarpon Springs ^{(4)}	Ronald Reagan (Texas)		Carmel (Indiana)
2006 (31st)	Beechwood (Kentucky)	Tarpon Springs ^{(5)}	The Woodlands (Texas)		Broken Arrow (Oklahoma)
2007 (32nd)	Adair County ^{(2)}	Marian Catholic ^{(13)}	L. D. Bell (Texas)		L. D. Bell (Texas)
2008 (33rd)	Bourbon County (Kentucky)	Marian Catholic ^{(14)}	Avon (Indiana)		Avon (Indiana)
Year	A Class	AA Class	AAA Class	AAAA Class	Champion
2009 (34th)	Bourbon County ^{(2)}	Marian Catholic ^{(15)}	Center Grove ^{(3)}	Avon (Indiana)	Avon ^{(2)}
2010 (35th)	Bourbon County ^{(3)}	Marian Catholic ^{(16)}	Tarpon Springs (Florida)	Avon ^{(2)}	Avon ^{(3)}
2011 (36th)	Beechwood ^{(2)}	Marian Catholic ^{(17)}	Lafayette (Louisiana)	Broken Arrow (Oklahoma)	Broken Arrow ^{(2)}
2012 (37th)	Western ^{(5)}	Tarpon Springs ^{(6)}	Kennesaw Mountain ^{(2)}	Carmel (Indiana)	Carmel ^{(2)}
2013 (38th)	Bellbrook ^{(7)}	Marian Catholic ^{(18)}	Harrison (Georgia)	The Woodlands (Texas)	The Woodlands (Texas)
2014 (39th)	Adair County ^{(3)}	Tarpon Springs ^{(7)}	Kennesaw Mountain ^{(3)}	Broken Arrow ^{(2)}	Tarpon Springs (Florida)
2015 (40th)	Adair County ^{(4)}	Marian Catholic ^{(19)}	Harrison ^{(2)}	Hebron (Texas)	Broken Arrow ^{(3)}
2016 (41st)	Adair County ^{(5)}	Tarpon Springs ^{(8)}	Leander (Texas)	Avon ^{(3)}	Carmel ^{(3)}
2017 (42nd)	Adair County ^{(6)}	Marian Catholic ^{(20)}	Castle (Indiana)	Carmel ^{(2)}	Carmel ^{(4)}
2018 (43rd)	Bourbon County ^{(4)}	Tarpon Springs ^{(9)}	Dobyns-Bennett (Tennessee)	Carmel ^{(3)}	Carmel ^{(5)}
2019 (44th)	Bourbon County ^{(5)}	Marian Catholic ^{(21)}	Leander ^{(2)}	Vandegrift (Texas)	Vandegrift (Texas)
2020 (—)	Championships cancelled due to COVID-19				
2021 (45th)	Murray ^{(2)}	Norwin	Dobyns-Bennett ^{(2)}	Broken Arrow ^{(3)}	Broken Arrow ^{(4)}
2022 (46th)	Archbishop Alter (Ohio)	Tarpon Springs ^{(10)}	Dobyns-Bennett ^{(3)}	Carmel ^{(4)}	Carmel ^{(6)}
2023 (47th)	Bourbon County ^{(6)}	Kiski Area ^{(3)}	Blue Springs (Missouri)	Carmel ^{(5)}	Avon ^{(4)}
2024 (48th)	Murray ^{(3)}	Tarpon Springs ^{(11)}	Cedar Park (Texas)	Avon ^{(4)}	Avon ^{(5)}
2025 (49th)	South Jones (Mississippi)	Arlington (Tennessee)	Blue Springs ^{(2)}	Avon ^{(5)}	Avon ^{(6)}
2026 (50th)	Marian Catholic (Illinois)	Tarpon Springs ^{(12)}	Castle ^{(2)}	Avon ^{(6)}	Avon ^{(7)}

=== Summer National Championships (1980–1989) ===
In 1980, the Summer Workshop and Festival was relaunched as the Summer National Championship. The 1989 Summer National Champion, Christian Brothers, was a combined band representing four schools from the Chicago metro-area: Brother Rice, Mother McAuley, St. Laurence, and Queen of Peace high schools.

Year	A Class	AA Class	Open Class	—	Champion
1980 (1st)	Herscher (Illinois)	Chesterton (Indiana)	James B. Conant (Illinois)		James B. Conant (Illinois)
1981 (2nd)	Herscher ^{(2)}	Chesterton ^{(2)}	Independence (California)		Independence (California)
1982 (3rd)	Herscher ^{(3)}	Chesterton ^{(3)}	Norwin (Pennsylvania)		Herscher (Illinois)
1983 (4th)	Herscher ^{(4)}	University (Washington)	Clovis (California)		University (Washington)
1984 (5th)	Oskaloosa (Iowa)	Marian Catholic (Illinois)	St. Laurence (Illinois)		Marian Catholic (Illinois)
1985 (6th)	Western (Indiana)	Marian Catholic ^{(2)}	Mountain Crest (Utah)		Marian Catholic ^{(2)}
Year	A Class	AA Class	AAA Class	Open Class	Champion
1986 (7th)	Kosciusko (Mississippi)	Marian Catholic ^{(3)}	St. Laurence (Illinois)	Imperial Scots (Note: Member band of Mid-America Competing Band Directors Association (MACBDA).) (Illinois)	Marian Catholic ^{(3)}
1987 (8th)	Oskaloosa ^{(2)}	Marian Catholic ^{(4)}	Fred C. Beyer (California)	Sun Prairie (Wisconsin)	Marian Catholic ^{(4)}
1988 (9th)	Oskaloosa ^{(3)}	Marian Catholic ^{(5)}	Armijo (California)	Sun Prairie ^{(2)}	Marian Catholic ^{(5)}
1989 (10th)	Rocori (Minnesota)	Sky View (Utah)	No champion	Christian Brothers (Illinois)	Christian Brothers (Note: "Christian Brothers" was a combined band representing four high schools from the Chicago-area: Brother Rice, Mother McAuley, St. Laurence, Queen of Peace.) (Illinois)
