= Kentucky State Marching Band Championships =

Marching band competitions

- Nickname: KMEA State Finals
- Status: Active
- Genre: Music competition
- Date: Last Saturday of October
- Frequency: Annually
- Venue: Western Kentucky University, Eastern Kentucky University, University of Louisville, and University of Kentucky (alternates State Finals location per year)
- Locations: Kentucky, USA
- Years active: 40 Years
- Inaugurated: 1986
- Founder: Kentucky Music Educators Association
- Most recent: 2026 State Finals held in Bowling Green, Kentucky and Campbellsville, Kentucky
- Participants: All Kentucky High Schools with a competing Marching Band participating in KMEA
- Website: www.kmea.org

The Kentucky State Marching Band Championships is an annual contest held by the Kentucky Music Educators Association that takes place each fall over the course of several weeks to determine the Kentucky high school marching band state champion in five respective classes.

== Origins ==
The Kentucky Marching Band Championships first began in 1986, when the Kentucky Music Educators Association (KMEA) first sponsored the event, with the finals held at Commonwealth Stadium in Lexington. Before 1986, several other contests claimed to be the Kentucky state championship, such as Murray State's "Festival of Champions" and Middle Tennessee State University's "Contest of Champions." The first state champions were George Rogers Clark High School (4A), Glasgow High School (3A), Bremen High School (2A), and Adair County High School (1A). Also that year, 4A champion George Rogers Clark was awarded the Overall Grand Champion title. However, this "overall champion" concept was discarded after the first year, and since then state champions have been considered by the association to be equal in stature.

The KMEA championships have been held each year in late October and occasionally early November, and with one exception have always been a multi-round contest.

== Format ==
Prior to the start of each marching season, all Kentucky marching bands are grouped into five classes (1A, 2A, 3A, 4A, 5A) based on a formula that takes school size and band size into account. (Before 2005 bands were grouped into four classes based only on band size, and from 2005 to 2018 bands were grouped into five classes based only on the enrollment of the bands' respective high schools.) Beginning in September, all bands have the opportunity to participate in contests held throughout the state that have been sanctioned by KMEA. The requirements for qualifying for regional quarterfinals competition has been lowered several times in the 1990s and early 2000s. Currently, bands that attend at least two sanctioned contests are then allowed to continue to regional quarterfinals competitions within their classes that take place in mid- to late-October. During regional quarterfinals competition, the top six scoring bands from each region (East and West) advance to the state semifinals, which take place the following week. At semifinals, the top six bands from each class advance to the state finals held that evening. The six from each class then perform one last time at one of four college football stadiums in the state. After all thirty performances have been presented, the top scoring band from each class is named class state champion.

== List of champions ==
Below is a list of state champions within KMEA History.

Year	Finals venue	A		AA		AAA		AAAA		AAAAA	
1986	Commonwealth Stadium	Adair County	84.50	Bremen	78.25	Glasgow	85.35	George Rogers Clark	90.30	N/A	
1987	Cardinal Stadium	Campbellsville	75.10	Adair County	87.70	Meade County	83.90	North Hardin	93.80	N/A	
1988	L. T. Smith Stadium	Bremen	87.60	Bowling Green	89.12	Adair County	90.41	North Hardin	95.60	N/A	
1989	L. T. Smith Stadium	Hazard	82.52	Madison Central	91.58	Adair County	93.76	North Hardin	95.71	N/A	
1990	Roy Kidd Stadium	Beechwood	84.30	Adair County	89.80	Dixie Heights	87.50	Lafayette	90.90	N/A	
1991	Roy Kidd Stadium	Madison Southern	84.35	Adair County	91.14	Paul Laurence Dunbar	89.51	Lafayette	95.23	N/A	
1992	L. T. Smith Stadium	Madison Southern	87.28	Adair County	92.13	Central Hardin	91.33	Lafayette	95.58	N/A	
1993	L. T. Smith Stadium*	Pleasure Ridge Park	92.95	Adair County	92.15	Elizabethtown	90.85	Lafayette	93.43	N/A	
1994	Roy Kidd Stadium	Hazard	88.79	Adair County	94.10	Elizabethtown	88.11	Lafayette	94.53	N/A	
1995	Roy Kidd Stadium	Grant County	91.85	Adair County	93.35	Elizabethtown	92.26	Lafayette	96.23	N/A	
1996	Commonwealth Stadium	Nicholas County	91.90	Mercer County	93.91	Harrison County	94.75	Lafayette	93.70	N/A	
1997	Commonwealth Stadium	Nicholas County	87.95	Adair County	93.20	Elizabethtown	92.90	Lafayette	93.00	N/A	
1998	L. T. Smith Stadium	Hazard	88.50	Grant County	92.50	Elizabethtown	94.10	Lafayette	93.90	N/A	
1999	L. T. Smith Stadium	Marion County	94.01	Adair County	93.35	Harrison County	96.35	Lafayette	97.25†	N/A	
2000	L. T. Smith Stadium	Nicholas County	91.78	Adair County	91.66	Harrison County	92.16	Lafayette	96.16	N/A	
2001	Commonwealth Stadium	Boyle County	88.60	Adair County	90.80	Daviess County	88.20	Lafayette	93.25	N/A	
2002	Commonwealth Stadium	Boyle County	89.50	Harrison County	91.60	George Rogers Clark	88.00	Lafayette	90.90	N/A	
2003	L. T. Smith Stadium	Boyle County	89.36	Harrison County	91.80	Russell County	91.45	Paul Laurence Dunbar	96.75	N/A	
2004	L. T. Smith Stadium	Williamstown	90.30	Adair County	92.20	Madison Central	89.80	Paul Laurence Dunbar	95.12	N/A	
2005	L. T. Smith Stadium	Williamstown	85.20	Mercer County	83.76	Adair County	92.90	Madisonville-North Hopkins	88.50	Paul Laurence Dunbar	92.90
2006	L. T. Smith Stadium	Beechwood	88.80	Mercer County	87.70	Adair County	92.14	Madisonville-North Hopkins	87.00	Lafayette	95.30
2007	Papa John's Cardinal Stadium	Williamstown	89.10	Muhlenberg South	88.66	Adair County	96.11	Madisonville-North Hopkins	89.71	Paul Laurence Dunbar	94.70
2008	Papa John's Cardinal Stadium	Williamstown	87.87	Washington County	80.35	Bourbon County	92.20	Madisonville-North Hopkins	89.79	Lafayette	94.67
2009	Papa John's Cardinal Stadium	Williamstown	89.87	Washington County	82.11	Bourbon County	91.21	Madisonville-North Hopkins	88.62	Lafayette	93.08
2010	Papa John's Cardinal Stadium	Beechwood	89.80	Glasgow	84.60	Adair County	93.95	Madisonville-North Hopkins	84.85	Paul Laurence Dunbar	92.65
2011	L. T. Smith Stadium	Beechwood	90.75	LaRue County	84.65	Adair County	91.50	Madisonville-North Hopkins	89.05	Paul Laurence Dunbar	94.00
2012	L. T. Smith Stadium	Beechwood	84.20	Glasgow	79.10	Bourbon County	92.35	Madisonville-North Hopkins	88.15	Lafayette	93.90
2013	Papa John's Cardinal Stadium	Beechwood	87.00	Glasgow	83.00	Bourbon County	90.60	Madisonville-North Hopkins	90.86	Lafayette	95.54
2014	Roy Kidd Stadium	Williamstown	89.90	Garrard County	86.20	Russell County	92.90	Madisonville-North Hopkins	89.45	Madison Central	94.75
2015	L.T. Smith Stadium	Beechwood	82.55	Estill County	83.00	Adair County	89.80	Grant County	89.90	Madison Central	94.05
2016	Papa John's Cardinal Stadium	Beechwood	83.95	Estill County	82.30	Bourbon County	88.70	Hopkinsville	84.10	Madison Central	90.25
2017	Papa John's Cardinal Stadium	Murray	81.65	Adair County	91.20	Bourbon County	86.05	Anderson County	87.80	Lafayette	92.95
2018	Kroger Field	Murray	80.95	Adair County	86.90	Bourbon County	88.30	South Laurel	85.05	Lafayette	91.20
2019	L.T. Smith Stadium	Hancock County	76.55	Beechwood	85.20	Adair County	89.00	South Laurel	89.10	Lafayette	94.00
2020	SMBC Canceled due to COVID-19	No Champion		No Champion		No Champion		No Champion		No Champion	
2021	Kroger Field	Owensboro Catholic	84.85	Beechwood	90.75	Murray	90.80	Anderson County	92.60	Lafayette	93.10
2022	Roy Kidd Stadium	Washington County	81.40	Glasgow	87.70	Estill County	88.65	Bourbon County	91.90	Madison Central	92.80
2023	L.T. Smith Stadium	Washington County	84.85	Beechwood	88.30	Murray	92.20	Bourbon County	88.50	Lafayette	93.50
2024	L&N Stadium	Mayfield	86.20	Estill County	89.15	Murray	90.40	Anderson County	88.85	Lafayette	93.30
2025	L.T. Smith Stadium	Washington County	87.45	Beechwood	91.55	Murray	89.85	Christian County	93.10	Lafayette	93.45
2026	Ron Finley Stadium and L.T. Smith Stadium‡	Hancock County	87.45	Estill County	84.45	Adair County	90.25	Murray	90.40	Lafayette	90.90

* In 1993, the finals round was cancelled and semifinals scores determined the state champions.

† Lafayette High School's score of 97.25 in 1999 is the highest score in KMEA history.

‡ In 2026, State Finals was held at two separate venues: Campbellsville University for 1A-2A, and Western Kentucky University fo 3A-5A.

Bands with 5 or more state championships:

- Lafayette (26)
- Adair County (25)
- Beechwood (12)
- Madisonville-North Hopkins (10)
- Bourbon County (9)
- Paul Laurence Dunbar (7)
- Murray (7)
- Madison Central (6)
- Williamstown (6)
- Elizabethtown (5)
- Harrison County (5)
- Glasgow (5)

Bands with the most state championships by decade:

- 1980s – Adair County (4)
- 1990s – Lafayette (10)
- 2000s – Adair County (6)
- 2010s – Beechwood (7)
- 2020s – Murray and Lafayette (5)

== Championship history ==
=== Early North Hardin success ===
After George Rogers Clark won the first state title in class 4A, a period elapsed in which North Hardin High School won each year from 1987 to 1989, with Lafayette High School finishing closely behind in second or third place. However, in 1990 North Hardin's director, Craig Cornish left North Hardin for a newly constructed high school in Lexington named Paul Laurence Dunbar. North Hardin fell out of the championship finals for the first time while Lafayette won their first state title in 1990. And in 1991, Paul Laurence Dunbar band's 2nd year of existence, PLD toppled favorites Harrison County and Elizabethtown to win class AAA. Class AAAA was once again captured by Lafayette for the 2nd consecutive year after trailing GRC earlier in the season.

=== Lafayette dominance, Paul Laurence Dunbar's entrance into 4A and the re-emergence of North Hardin ===
Paul Laurence Dunbar High School entered class 4A in 1992 to compete with cross-town rival, Lafayette, which rolled to an all-time record of 13-straight state titles from 1990 to 2002. In 1993 North Hardin returned to the spotlight with a second-place finish based on its semifinals performance—state finals were cancelled that year due to snow. Despite North's and Dunbar's successes, Lafayette still remained dominant under directors Steven Moore and Charles Smith having the highest score in state finals history (and still today, Lafayette has more than half of the top-20 scores in state history).

=== North's departure and Dunbar dethrones Lafayette and becomes Kentucky's first AAAAA Champions ===
For various reasons in 2001 North Hardin stopped competing in the state championships, which opened the door for Lafayette's cross-town rivals Tates Creek and Paul Laurence Dunbar to become its star competition. Finals was held in Lexington, Kentucky at Commonwealth Stadium for the first time since 1996. Also in 2001, Brian Morgan joined Jeff Hood at Dunbar as the assistant director. In 2002, Dunbar beat Lafayette early in the season at Bryan Station tournament of bands and also defeated them in the state preliminary competition but once again, Lafayette surpassed PLD in finals by a tenth of a point and claimed the Governor's cup trophy. 2002 finals had taken place in Lexington's commonwealth stadium for a consecutive year. In 2003, state was held at Western Kentucky University. The crowd erupted as Paul Laurence Dunbar finally dethroned Lafayette in the 2003 state finals. Dunbar would go on to defeat Lafayette for the state championship again in 2004. In 2005, when KMEA introduced the new 1A–5A school-size classification system, Dunbar prevailed victorious over Lafayette once more, becoming KMEA's first ever 5A champion, and winning Dunbar's 3rd consecutive state championship (fourth over-all), thus tying North Hardin's three consecutive titles from the late 1980s.

=== The 2006–2008 finals ===
The 2006 finals marked the 20-year anniversary of the KMEA state marching band championship. 5A was solely a two-band race between Dunbar and Lafayette, many felt Lafayette's time had ended and given way to Dunbar's new era. However, after losing semifinals, Lafayette pulled ahead of Dunbar by 2.5 points and won its fourteenth title.

The 2007 finals competition was held in Louisville for the first time since 1987 and at Papa John's Cardinal Stadium for the first time. In class 1A, Williamstown regained the state-champion title after trailing Beechwood for the majority of the regular season. Cumberland County also made its first appearance in finals. In Class 2A, Muhlenberg South won its first state title in only its second finals' appearance. Adair county posted one of the highest scores ever in KMEA finals with a 96.11, giving them the highest score of the evening. In class 5A, Dunbar took the state title winning its fifth state championship over Lafayette, North Hardin, and Madison Central, in that order.

In 2008, numerous traditional finalists changed classes and new rivalries were instantly created. In class 1A, Williamstown successfully defended its title, the first time a class 1A band had done so since 2005. Mayfield also made its first-ever finals appearance, finishing fourth. In class 2A, Washington County was able to win its first state championship. Shelby Valley and Caldwell County also made their first finals appearances, finishing in third and fourth, respectively. In class 3A, Adair County's dominance was challenged, as Bourbon County led by Adair County alumni Eric Hale claimed the title for the first time. In class 4A, newcomers and recent champions from other classes, Boyle County, Mercer County, and Calloway County, challenged for the title, though in the end Madisonville North Hopkins High School won its fourth straight state championship. In class 5A, Lafayette, coming back from an upsetting 2nd-place finish in 2007, reclaimed the title over second place Dunbar. North Hardin took home third place and John Hardin made finals in class 5A for the second time and finished in 4th place.

=== 2009–2018 ===
In 2009, for the first time in history, all of the previous state champions retained their titles. Though the evening was not without surprises, especially in 5A where Madison Central took 2nd place behind Lafayette, while Paul Laurence Dunbar placed fourth, falling out of the top two for the first time since 2001. North Hardin placed 3rd, trailing Madison Central by only a few tenths and Lafayette claimed another state title, bringing its total to 16.

2010 proved to be an intensely exciting year for marching competition. In class 1A, Beechwood regained the governor's cup after Williamstown had won it for three consecutive years, and Mayfield made its second state finalist appearance in school history. In Class 2A, Glasgow took home its second state championship (the first being in 1986), upsetting the reigning state champion Washington County. Green County made its second consecutive state finalist appearance. Danville made its second finalist appearance in 2010, its first time and last time in finals was 1986. In class 3A, Adair County won another title, winning its 19th state championship and first under former Elizabethtown and John Hardin director Tom Case. Bourbon finished second in 3A. Taylor County placed third and made its first appearance in state finals since 1992. The reigning 4A champion, Madisonville-North Hopkins, was challenged by Grant County, Madisonville placed fourth in the mornings semi-final round, but claimed the championship once again at finals. In class 5A, Dunbar had an exceptional year. Repeatedly outscoring the other bands all season, defeated Lafayette, winning its sixth championship. Lafayette placed second. Madison Central took fourth place, behind North Hardin, who finished third for a fifth consecutive year.

The 2011 KMEA SMBC Finals was held at WKU for the first time since the 2006 season. In Class 1A, Beechwood defended its title for its first-ever back-To-back championship. In Class 2A, LaRue County won the championship with defending champs Glasgow moving down to fourth. Adair defended its 3A title while Bourbon placed second. This gave Adair County their 20th State Championship, the first program to achieve this feat. Madisonville North-Hopkins won yet another Class 4A championship while Grant County stayed in second, John Hardin finishing in third place and first-time finalist West Jessamine claiming fourth. In Class 5A, Eastern High School made the finals for the first time, being placed third and knocking out perennial finalist North Hardin. Madison Central, after finishing in sixth place in their regional quarterfinals, claimed fourth place. The fight for number one between Dunbar and Lafayette was particularly intense; repeatedly outscoring each other throughout the season, but on finals night Dunbar dominated the competition and won its seventh state championship title.

The 2012 season was again held at WKU and had similar surprises to the 2011 season. In class 1A, Beechwood and Murray retained its placements from the previous season, while Hazard Independent High School was awarded second and Williamstown was awarded fourth. In Class 2A, Glasgow High School claimed the state championship, with former champion LaRue County in third, Danville High School in second, and Hart County in fourth in its first-ever state finals appearance. In class 3A, Bourbon County took the state title with former champion Adair County in second place. In class 4A, Madisonville North-Hopkins won its eighth consecutive championship, along with former finalists Grant County and John Hardin in second and fourth, respectively, and Anderson County in its first ever finals appearance. In class 5A, Lafayette reclaimed the state title and won its 17th state championship, with former champions Paul Laurence Dunbar in fourth place, Madison Central high school in third, and North Hardin in second place for the first time since 2000.

The 2013 season was moved back to Louisville, Kentucky and was the second year in the contest's history in which all five of the previous state champions defended their titles. In class 1A, Murray and Williamstown high school were named finalists in second and third place, respectively, with newcomer Paris High School in 4th. In class 2A, Trigg County was named the second place finalist with two newcomers in third and fourth, Owensboro Catholic and Christian Academy of Louisville. In class 3A, Adair County was named second place being .5 points behind Bourbon County, with two former finalists, Russell and Garrard Counties in third and fourth. In class 4A, South Oldham returned for a performance with two previous competitors, Anderson County and Grant County taking second and third. Class 5A, Lafayette claimed their 18th state championship, trailed by Madison Central, Paul Laurence Dunbar, and North Hardin.

The 2014 championships had been relocated to Roy Kidd Stadium in Richmond for the first time since 1995 and proved to hold a multitude of surprises. In class 1A, Williamstown finally reclaimed the title from defending champion Beechwood, with Murray and Hazard in third and fourth, respectively. In class 2A, Garrard County won its first-ever state championship after being reclassified from 3A, with other previous 2A competitors Washington County and Trigg County in third and fourth, respectively. Estill County also made its first-ever finals appearance and claimed the second-place spot. In class 4A, Madisonville North-Hopkins claimed its tenth consecutive championship, trailed by Grant County, Anderson County, and John Hardin. The biggest upsets occurred in classes 3A and 5A. In class 3A, neither Adair nor Bourbon County claimed the championship for the first time since 2004. Instead, Russell County won its championship under the new KMEA format. In class 5A, Madison Central became the third school to win a class 5A championship, trailed by Lafayette, Paul Laurence Dunbar, and North Hardin.

In the 2015 season, championship titles were reclaimed in classes 1A, 3A & 5A by Beechwood and Adair County and Madison Central bands. Madison Central barely edged semi final winner North Hardin by tenths, and the Paul Laurence Dunbar band was also tenths of a point behind the top two bands in one of the closest finals to date for the 5A Governor's cup. Estill County emerged with its first ever state championship in class 2A. The biggest surprises were in class 4A as Madisonville-North Hopkins high school came in second to cross-state rival, Grant County high school, along with Hopkinsville high school making its ever state finals appearance. In class 5A, Lafayette finished in fourth place (the first time since 1987 it placed below 2nd at state finals.)

In 2016, in classes 1A, 2A, and 5A, Beechwood, Estill County, and Madison Central retained their state champion titles with the other two classes having some monumental surprises. In class 3A, defending champion Adair County was awarded third place with the previous year's runner-up. Bourbon County claimed the 3A championship followed by Russell County in second and Taylor County in fourth. In class 4A, defending champion Grant County was 8th place in semifinals and did not advance to finals, neither did perennial finalist Madisonville North Hopkins. Instead, Anderson County and Hopkinsville retained two finalist spots with two newcomers, South Warren, and Barren County, with Hopkinsville taking the title, making them the third school ever to win class 4A under the new format.

In 2017, in their 16th KMEA state finals appearance, Murray won its first 1A state championship with a show ironically titled "The Bridesmaid" and ended Beechwood's bid for a third straight championship. Adair County moved back to class 2A for the first time since 2004 and claimed their 22nd state championship. Adair County completed an undefeated season. In class 3A, Bourbon County defended their state championship in dramatic fashion by moving from 4th to 1st place from state semifinals to finals. In 4A, South Laurel made their first finals appearance and Anderson County claimed their first state championship. In 5A, Lafayette ended Madison Central's title run and claimed their 19th state championship. Larry A. Ryle with new director, Joe Craig edged out Dunbar and returned to state finals for the first time since 2002. This was Dunbar's first time ever missing finals.

In 2018, state finals returned to Lexington for the first time since 2002. Murray defended their 1A state championship after placing 2nd in state semifinals. Returning to 2A for a second straight year, Adair County won yet another state championship, the 23rd in their history. In class 3A, under new leadership by Michael Stone, Bourbon County claimed the state championship even after the retirement of their long-time director, Eric Hale. In class 4A, South Laurel claimed their first state championship. In class 5A, Lafayette repeated and claimed their 20th state championship.

=== 2019 "Hybrid" Classification ===
In 2019, KMEA reformulated their classification system to a "hybrid" format of band size and school size. Several finalist programs changed classes. In a very different-looking class 1A, Hancock County, in their first-ever state finals appearance, took home the state championship. Hancock County became the first school other than Williamstown, Beechwood, and Murray to win a 1A state championship since 2003, and they were also the second school in the contest's history to win a state championship in their first state finals appearance (the other being Meade County in 1987). Williamstown also fell out of state finals for the first time since 2001, finishing 5th in 1A. In class 2A, longtime 1A rivals, Beechwood and Murray, finished at the top of their new class yet again with Beechwood claiming their ninth overall state championship and seventh in the 2010s, the most of any program in the state. In 3A, Adair County claimed their KMEA record 24th state championship barely edging out Estill County for the third straight year. In 4A, South Laurel edged out former 3A power Bourbon County by one-tenth of a point to claim their second straight state championship, making South Laurel the first band in 4A to win more than one state championship since Madisonville-North Hopkins. In 5A, Lafayette claimed their third straight state championship and 21st overall. After four straight state runners-up finishes, North Hardin did not compete in the KMEA state championships for the first time since 2004. With the state championship, Lafayette's director, Chuck Smith tied former Adair County director, Tim Allen for the most KMEA state championships with 18. This would be Chuck Smith's final championship, as he retired in 2021 following health issues.

In 2020, KMEA was set to reformat their championships to a "6 and 6" format. Six bands from each class in each region advance to state semifinals (for a total of 12 semifinalists in each class) and 6 bands from each class move on to state finals (for a total of 30 state finalists). This is the first major change to the KMEA championship format since its inception in 1986. This reformat was delayed to 2021 by the COVID-19 pandemic.

In 2021, the contest returned and was held in Lexington. With six bands in finals in each class, more bands were given an opportunity to perform in finals. In Class 1A, Owensboro Catholic won their first state championship trailed by Williamstown, Mayfield, Cumberland County, newcomer finalist Somerset high school, and Nicholas County high school. In class 2A, defending champion Beechwood high school became the fourth school in Kentucky to win ten championships, followed by Glasgow, LaRue County, Hancock County in their first class 2A appearance (having previously been the class 1A champion in 2019), Mercer County, and John Hardin also in their first class 2A finals appearance (previously having been a finalist in classes 3A, 4A, and 5A). In class 3A, Murray won their first class 3A championship (having previously been state champions in class 1A) while previous winner Adair County was awarded third place, with Estill County taking second, Russell County fourth, Taylor County sixth, and Madison Southern taking fifth in their first state finals appearance in class 3A (having previously made state finals in class 1A). In class 4A, Anderson County won their second state championship followed by Bourbon County, South Laurel, and Christian County in their first 4A finals appearance (having previously made finals in class 3A), Harrison County, and Hopkinsville respectively. In class 5A, Lafayette under the direction of Dee Bishop, claimed their twenty-second state championship with competitor Madison Central in second place, returning competitor to the state competition North Hardin in third place, Larry A. Ryle in fourth place, George Rogers Clark in fifth, and newcomer to class 5A finals Central Hardin high school in sixth place. (Having previously been a finalist in class 3A). This was just the second time Paul Laurence Dunbar had missed finals.

In 2022, the contest returned to Richmond for the first time since 2014. In Class 1A, Washington County claimed their third overall championship, their first in Class 1A, with previous champion Owensboro Catholic in second place, followed by Mayfield, Williamstown, Cumberland County, and Campbellsville making their first state finals appearance since 1998. Most of the bands from the previous year that were finalists in Class 2A were reclassified into 3A or did not compete in the state competition, leaving Glasgow and Hancock County, with the former claiming the championship, the latter claiming second place, and followed by Trigg County in third place, with three newcomers to finals, Corbin, Russellville, and Powell County in fourth, fifth, and sixth, respectively. In Class 3A, Estill County claimed their third overall championship, (their first in Class 3A), trailed by the previous state champion, Murray, followed by Beechwood, Russell County, Taylor County, and Garrard County returning to finals for the first time since 2018. In class 4A, Bourbon County claimed their 8th overall championship, (their first title in class 4A), with previous champion Anderson County in second place, Christian County in third, Tates Creek (making their first state finals appearance since 2002) in fourth, Harrison County in fifth, and South Laurel in sixth. In Class 5A, Madison Central claimed their sixth overall state championship with previous champion Lafayette finishing in second, followed by Larry A. Ryle in third, returning competitor Paul Laurence Dunbar in fourth place, and Henry Clay in fifth having made their second-ever state finals appearance (their first appearance being in Class 3A in 2004), and George Rogers Clark in sixth.

In 2023, the contest returned to Bowling Green. In Class 1A, previous champion Washington County defended their title, edging out second-place Mayfield by 0.25 points. The two were followed by Williamstown, Campbellsville, Nicholas County, and Owensboro Catholic. In Class 2A, Beechwood and Estill County tied for the championship; however, Beechwood earned the highest music performance score, thus earning their third 2A title in 4 years. Estill County took second place, followed by Glasgow, Russell Independent, Hancock County, and North Oldham, making their first ever state finals appearance. In Class 3A, Murray took first place and their second title in 3 years, followed by returning finalist Adair County, Russell County, South Laurel, Taylor County, and Garrard County. In Class 4A, Bourbon County defended their title from second-place Anderson County by 0.15 points. Following the first two were returning finalist Daviess County (their first state finals appearance in Class 4A), Christian County, returning finalist Madisonville North-Hopkins, and Tates Creek. In Class 5A, Lafayette reclaimed the state champion title from previous winner Madison Central, followed by Larry A. Ryle, Paul Laurence Dunbar, George Rogers Clark, and returning finalist North Hardin.

In 2024, the contest returned to Louisville. In Class 1A, Mayfield claimed their first state championship, beating out Nicholas County, defending champion Washington County, Owensboro Catholic, first-time finalist Lee County, and Williamstown. In Class 2A, Estill County reclaimed the title from defending champion Beechwood, who received second place. Followed by the two were Hancock County and returning finalists Mercer County, Lloyd Memorial, and Christian Academy of Louisville. In Class 3A, Murray claimed their fifth title, beating out defending 4A champion Bourbon County, Russell County, returning finalist Hopkinsville, Adair County, and Taylor County. In Class 4A, Anderson County claimed their third title, followed by returning finalist Harrison County, Christian County, Daviess County, Madisonville, and returning finalist Calloway County. In Class 5A, Lafayette claimed their twenty-fourth title, followed by Madison Central, Paul Laurence Dunbar, Larry A. Ryle, George Rogers Clark, and returning finalist Henry Clay.

In 2025, the contest returned to Bowling Green. In Class 1A, Washington won their third title in four years, winning over Mayfield, Lee County, Owensboro Catholic, Williamstown, and first-time finalist Metcalfe County. Lee County's third-place finish marked their highest state finals placement in program history. In Class 2A, Beechwood won their twelfth title, beating Hancock County, Estill County, Mercer County, returning finalist Russell Independent, and Lloyd Memorial. In Class 3A, Murray won their sixth title in eight years, followed by Taylor County, Russell County, Adair County, returning finalist LaRue County, and first-time finalist Allen County-Scottsville. Taylor County's second-place finish marked their highest state finals placement in program history. In Class 4A, in their final season before their merger with Hopkinsville, Christian County won their first state title and received the highest finals score by a 4A band since the implementation of the five-class system in 2005. They were followed by Daviess County, Hopkinsville, Anderson County, Madisonville, and Bourbon County. In Class 5A, Lafayette won their twenty-fifth title, surpassing Adair County as the winningest program in state history. They won over Larry A. Ryle, Paul Laurence Dunbar, Madison Central, returning finalist Campbell County, and George Rogers Clark. Ryle's second-place finish marked their highest state finals placement in program history.

=== 2026 "Hybrid" Redefinition ===
In 2026, KMEA redefined the hybrid classification system, where band size had a higher weight than school size. The 2026 SMBC was also held at two separate venues: Campbellsville for 1A and 2A, and Bowling Green for 3A, 4A, and 5A. In 1A, Hancock won their second-ever state championship, followed by Owensboro Catholic, defending champion Washington County, first-time finalist McLean County, Lee County, and Lloyd Memorial. In 2A, Estill County won their fourth state title, followed by Mayfield, returning finalist (their first since 1989) Highlands, Russell, and returning finalists Hart County and Christian Academy of Louisville. In 3A, Adair won their twenty-fifth championship, followed by reigning 2A champion Beechwood, Bourbon County, Taylor County, returning finalist Garrard County, and LaRue County. In 4A, Murray (defending 3A champions) won their seventh title in nine years, beating out Daviess County, returning finalist Harrison County, first-time finalist Woodford County, returning finalist Calloway County, and Allen County-Scottsville. In 5A, defending champions Lafayette won their twenty-sixth title, their eighth in ten years. They were followed by Paul Laurence Dunbar, Larry A. Ryle, Madison Central, Campbell County, and newly consolidated Christian County. A mere 1.05 points separated the top four finalists in 5A.

== High scores ==
1. 1999 4A Lafayette 97.25
2. 2003 4A Dunbar 96.75
3. 1999 3A Harrison Co. 96.35
4. 1996 4A Lafayette 96.23
5. 2000 4A Lafayette 96.16
6. 2007 3A Adair Co. 96.11
7. 1989 4A North Hardin 95.71
8. 2003 4A Lafayette 95.65 (Runner-up)
9. 1988 4A North Hardin 95.60
10. 1992 4A Lafayette 95.58
11. 2013 5A Lafayette 95.54
12. 1988 4A George Rogers Clark 95.50 (Runner-up)
13. 2006 5A Lafayette 95.30
14. 1991 4A Lafayette 95.23
15. 2004 4A Dunbar 95.12
16. 2014 5A Madison Central 94.75
17. 1996 3A Harrison Co. 94.75
18. 2007 5A Dunbar 94.70
19. 2008 5A Lafayette 94.67
20. 1994 4A Lafayette 94.53

== Records and notable events ==
- Of the top 20 scores, the old 4A/new 5A class has by far the most with 17 (85%), 3A has 3 (15%).
- Three of the top 20 scores were by runners-up.
- Lafayette has more top 20 scores than any other school, with 11 (55%); Dunbar is second with 3 (15%), while North Hardin and Harrison County are third with 2 each (10%).
- There have been two tie scores for State Champion:
  - 87.50 in 1990 between Dixie Heights and Harrison County. Harrison held a short lead in semi-finals. Regardless of the tie score, according to KMEA rules Dixie was awarded the Championship by way of Overall Music Score; 35 out of a possible 40 to Harrison's 34.40.
  - 33 years later in 2023, Beechwood and Estill County both received a score of 88.30 in finals; however, Beechwood's 36.30 in music performance over Estill County's 35.60 earned Beechwood the title.
- The longest winning streak is held by Lafayette with 13 consecutive championships (1990–2002). Madisonville-North Hopkins holds the second longest (2005–2014) with 10 consecutive championships in Class 4A, along with Adair County (1986–1995) with 10 consecutive championships in Class A (1986), AA (1987, 1990–95), and AAA (1988 and 1989).
- Lafayette has won the most state championships, earning their 26th in 2026.
- 21 schools have been in finals 10 or more times.
- Lafayette is the only school to have never missed finals.
- Only 4 schools, Adair County (1A, 2A, 3A), Grant County (1A, 2A, 4A), Madison Central (2A, 3A, 5A), Murray (1A, 3A, 4A), and Paul Laurence Dunbar (3A, 4A, 5A) have been state champion in three different classes.
- 42 schools have won a state championship.
- 12 schools have won 5 or more state championships (Madison Central, Adair County, Paul Laurence Dunbar, Elizabethtown, Harrison County, Bourbon County, Lafayette, Madisonville-North Hopkins, Beechwood, Williamstown, Estill County, and Murray).
- 4 schools have won 10 or more state championships (Adair County, Lafayette, Beechwood, and Madisonville-North Hopkins).
- 2009 and 2013 are the only two seasons in which all of the state champions repeated.
- Beechwood High School is the only band in Kentucky history to win a state championship without winning any individual judge. In 2012, Beechwood placed second in every caption, yet first overall.
- Beechwood High School is the only band in Kentucky history to win a state championship with four different directors (Briley-1, Owens-1, Craig-6, Bralley-4)
- Since the creation of class 5A in 2005, 2A has had the most state champions with nine, followed by 1A and 4A with seven, 3A with five, and 5A with three.
- There have only been two schools that have won state finals in their first appearance. Meade County High school won class 3A in 1987 in their first state finals appearance, and Hancock County high school won class 1A in their first state finals appearance in 2019.
- In 2019 KMEA changed its procedure for assigning bands to a hybrid system of band size and school size. Bands get 1–5 points for their school size and 1–5 points for their band's size.
  - 1A: 2–3 points
  - 2A: 4–5 points
  - 3A: 6–7 points
  - 4A: 8–9 points
  - 5A: 10 points
- In 2021, KMEA changed SMBC to include 6 bands from each class in finals, bringing the total number of bands in finals to 30.
- With the hybrid system introduced in 2019, Nelson County and Central Hardin are the only two schools that have competed in all five classes.
