= Ryle High School =

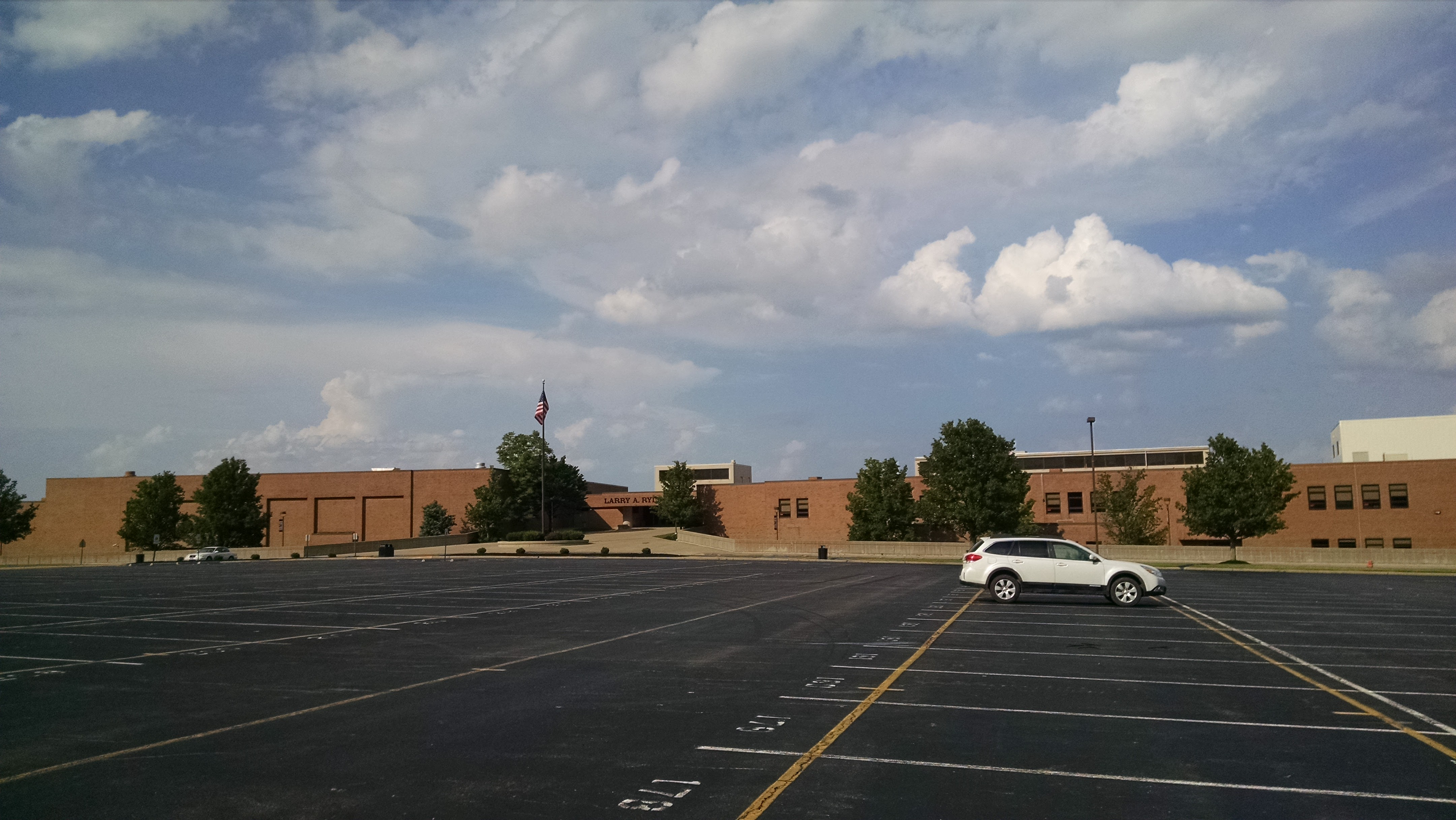

Location
- 10379 Highway 42; Union, KY 41091; United States; 38°55′59″N 84°40′39″W

Information
- Type: Public Secondary
- Motto: The "Union" of Technology and Tradition
- Established: 1992
- School district: Boone County Schools
- Superintendent: Matthew Turner
- Principal: Matthew Shafer
- Teaching staff: 109.00 (FTE)
- Grades: 9–12
- Enrollment: 2,062 (2023–2024)
- Student to teacher ratio: 18.92
- Colors: Black, silver and orange
- Mascot: Raiders
- Website: https://ryle.boone.kyschools.us/

Larry A. Ryle High School is a public secondary school located in Union, Kentucky. The school's mascot is the Raiders.

== History ==
Founded in 1992, it is one of four high schools (Boone County, Conner, Ryle, and Cooper) in the Boone County School District. The school was named in honor of Larry A. Ryle, a former superintendent, administrator, and teacher. Historically the school's main rival has been Boone County; other major rivals include Cooper, Conner, and Simon Kenton.

=== Hostage incident ===
On May 26, 1994, after shooting and killing his parents and two sisters at home, 17-year-old student Clay Shrout, armed with a .380-caliber Colt Mustang, held his classroom hostage at gunpoint for 30 minutes before releasing them and surrendering to the police, after being persuaded to do so by vice principal Steve Sorrell. Shrout was sentenced to 25 years to life. His first parole attempt was denied in 2019, and he is not eligible to apply for parole again until 2029.

== Academics ==
According to the 2017 U.S. News & World Report, Ryle was unranked nationally. As of 2017, the school earned a 49.0 on the college readiness index. The school had a 50% mathematics proficiency rating and a 72% English proficiency rating. 58% of the school was AP tested, and 72% scored a 3 or higher on their AP exams.

Ryle offers Advanced Placement courses, including classes in American history, European history, government, art, chemistry, biology, calculus, computer science, English language and literature, physics, psychology, and others. The school also offers honors courses, with the intent of challenging students and preparing them for post-secondary education.

== Sports ==
=== Baseball ===
Ryle's 2007 and 2013 baseball teams won the Regional Championship. The 2007 team compiled a record of 34–7. The 2013 team had a record of 35–4.

=== Boys' basketball ===
The Ryle Raider boys' 2002 basketball team won Districts and the 9th Region tournament to gain a place in the Sweet 16 at Rupp Arena. For the first time in school history the boys' basketball team made it to Lexington to battle for the State Championship. The Raiders didn't return with a state championship, but did have a record breaking season.

=== Girls' basketball ===
The Ryle Lady Raiders won the program's first Regional Championship in 2018 and made it to the KHSAA Elite 8. In the 2018–19 season the Lady Raiders finished the season with a 33–5 record (Program Record), winning The State Farm Holiday Classic and the Louisville Invitational Tournament. On February 22, 2019, Ryle defeated Conner 62–59, giving the Lady Raiders the 33rd District Championship. On March 4, 2019, Ryle defeated Dixie Heights 67–51, securing their 2nd consecutive 9th Region Championship. On March 17, 2019, the Ryle Lady Raiders defeated Southwestern 63–48, giving the Lady Raiders their first State Championship in the program's history. They were well on their way to repeating in 2020 if the tournament hadn't been cancelled due to COVID-19.

=== Boys' cross country ===
The Ryle Raider boys' 2021 cross country team placed 7th in the KHSAA Class 3A State Cross Country Championship, the highest in the school's history.

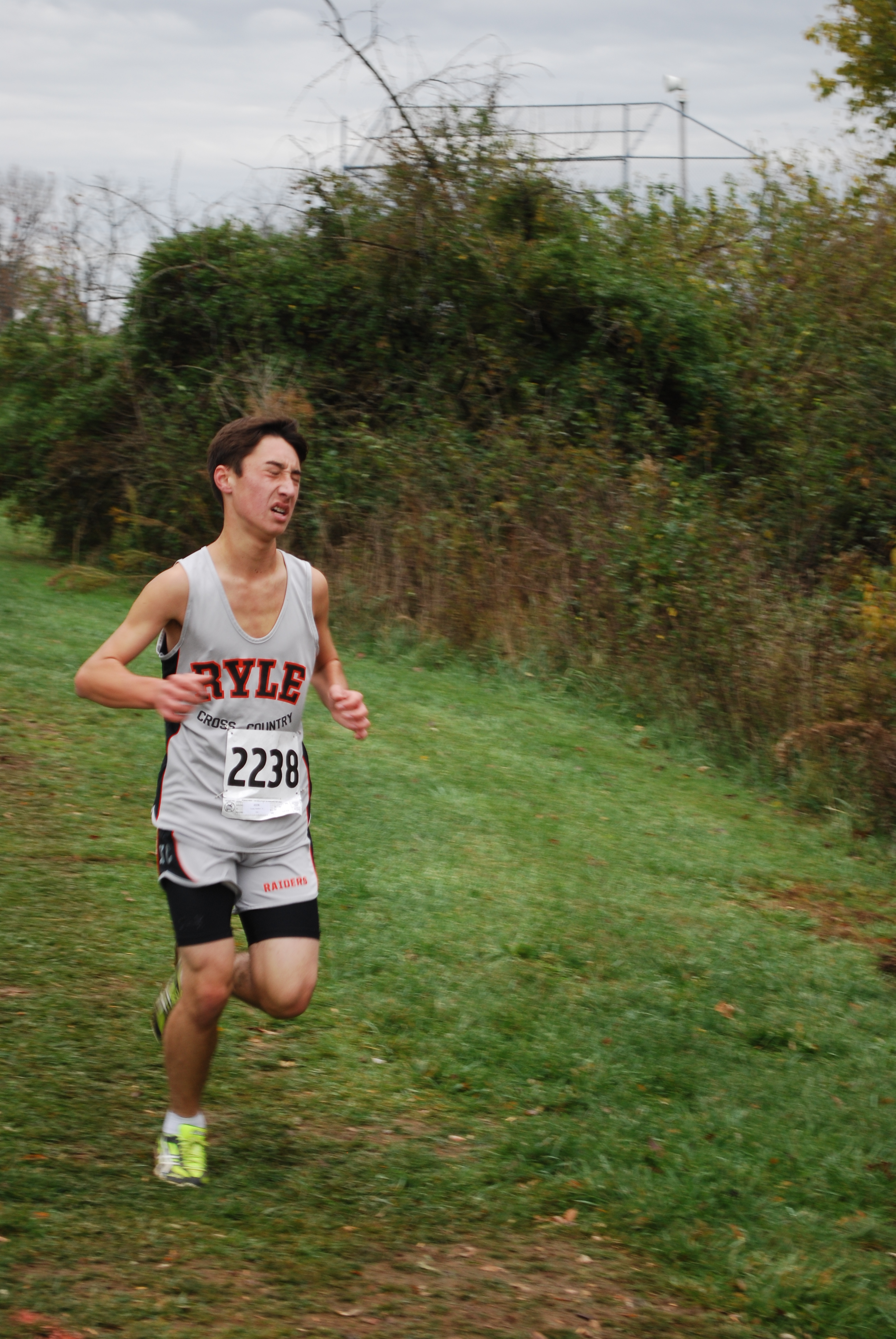
Larry A Ryle High School Boys Cross Country Runner – Ryle Invitational 2012

=== Softball ===
Ryle's Fast Pitch Softball team won the State Championship in 2006, were State Runners-Up in 2007, came in 4th in 2008 and came in 7th in 2010.

=== Soccer ===
In soccer, the Ryle Raiders were state runners-up in 2006, losing the championship game to Bowling Green.

The Raiders were again state runners-up in 2011, losing the championship game to St. Xavier High School.

The Raiders were regional champions and state semi-finalists in 2017.

In 2022, as well as 2023 the Raiders advanced to the semi-finals of state.

=== Football ===
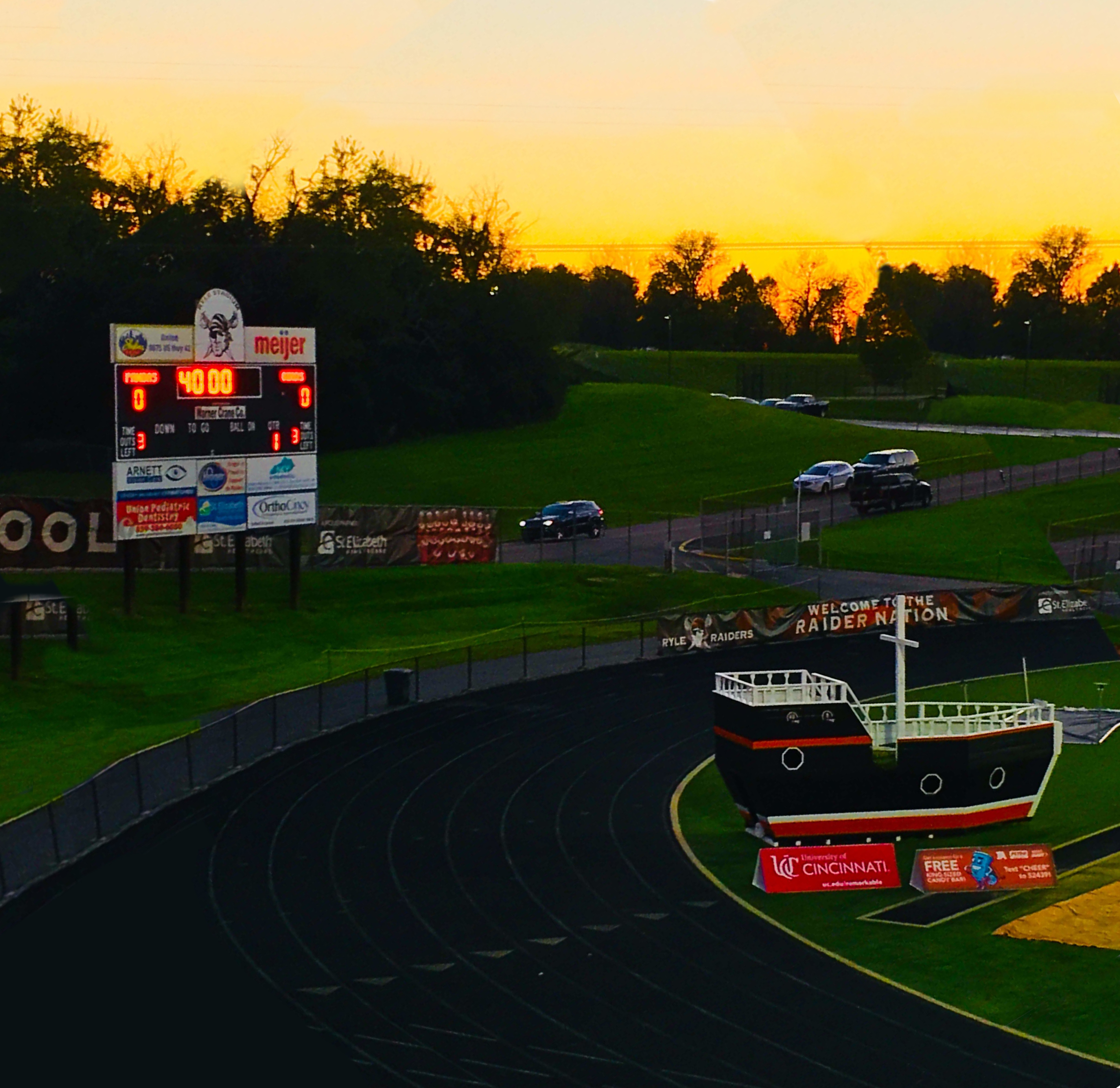

In football, the Ryle Raiders were state runners-up in 2006 and 2024, in 2006 losing the final game to Trinity High School 41–7, and in 2024 again losing to the Shamrocks 42–23.

=== Wrestling ===
- 3X State Runner-up: 2005, 2008, 2010
- 2X Kentucky State Duals Runner-up 2003, 2005
- 8X Regional Champions 2002, 2005, 2006, 2007, 2008, 2009, 2010, 2011
- 3X Regional Runner-up 2001, 2003, 2004
- 3X Northern Kentucky Athletic Conference Champions 2000, 2001, 2006
- 9 straight top 10 finishes in the KHSAA State Tournament 2002–2010
- 13 State Champions
- 12 State Runners-up
- 70 State Placers
- 58 Regional Champions
- 5 Div I Collegiate Athletes

=== Marching band ===
The Ryle Marching Band was founded along with the school itself in 1992. The Marching Band has competed every year since then, with the exception of the 2020 season, due to the COVID-19 Pandemic.

The Ryle Marching Band has appeared in the Kentucky Music Educators Association (KMEA) State Finals 10 times (2001, 2002, 2017, 2019, 2021, 2022, 2023, 2024, 2025, 2026).

Their highest placement in the KMEA Marching Band Championships is 2nd (2025)

Placement History
Year	Class	Placement	Score	Director(s)	Show Name
1992	N/A	Did not qualify	N/A	Dale Franklin	N/A
1993	AA	Did not qualify	N/A	Dale Franklin	N/A
1994	AA	20th (State Semifinals)	78.83	Michael E. Daulton	N/A
1995	AA	N/A	N/A	Michael E. Daulton	N/A
1996	AA	9th (East Quarterfinals)	N/A	Michael E. Daulton	N/A
1997	AAA	11th (State Semifinals)	83.35	Michael E. Daulton	N/A
1998	AA	9th (East Quarterfinals)	82.5	Michael E. Daulton	N/A
1999	A	6th (State Semifinals)	87.2	Michael E. Daulton	N/A
2000	A	14th (State Semifinals)	76.59	William M. Klopp	N/A
2001	A	4th (State Finals)	80.2	William M. Klopp	N/A
2002	A	4th (State Finals)	81.85	William M. Klopp	"Elements"
2003	AAA	Did not qualify	N/A	Matthew K. Carron	"Twighlight Till Dawn"
2004	AA	Did not qualify	N/A	Matthew K. Carron	"Indignation"
2005	AAAAA	9th (East Quarterfinals)	79.6	Matthew K. Carron	"Headlines"
2006	AAAAA	Did not attend KMEA SMBC	N/A	Matthew K. Carron	"The Journey Within"
2007	AAAAA	9th (East Quarterfinals)	82.27	Matthew K. Carron	"Saiko"
2008	AAAAA	Withdrew from Regionals	N/A	Matthew K. Carron	"Bring Me The Horizon"
2009	N/A	Did not attend KMEA SMBC	N/A	Matthew K. Carron	"The Ripple Effect"
2010	AAAAA	7th (State Semifinals)	86.15	Matthew K. Carron	"Sahara"
2011	AAAAA	13th (State Semifinals)	77.8	Matthew K. Carron	"The Beauty Within You"
2012	AAAAA	11th (State Semifinals)	84.15	Bob Elliot	"The Ritual"
2013	AAAAA	7th (State Semifinals)	84.6	Bob Elliot	"By Our Hands The Building of a Barn"
2014	AAAAA	7th (State Semifinals)	81.6	Bob Elliot	"Face Off"
2015	AAAAA	5th (State Semifinals)	84.65	Bob Elliot	"Something Wicked This Way Comes"
2016	AAAAA	6th (State Semifinals)	83.95	Bob Elliot	"American Tapestry"
2017	AAAAA	4th (State Finals)	86.7	Joe Craig	"The Rising
2018	AAAAA	7th (State Semifinals)	83.2	Joe Craig	"Breach"
2019	AAAAA	3rd (State Finals)	90.65	Joe Craig	"City of Dreams"
2020	AAAAA	Non-Competitive	N/A	Joe Craig	"Rocky Point Holiday"
2021	AAAAA	4th (State Finals)	88.75	Joe Craig	"Emergence"
2022	AAAAA	3rd (State Finals)	88.5	Joe Craig	"In Absentia"
2023	AAAAA	3rd (State Finals)	91.0	Joe Craig	"Unrequited"
2024	AAAAA	4th (State Finals)	89.050	Joe Craig	"The Space Between"
2025	AAAAA	2nd (State Finals)	92.9	Joe Craig	"Watercolors"
2026	AAAAA	3rd (State Finals)	90.0	Joe Craig	"The Signal"

== Notable alumni ==
- Justin Doellman – professional basketball player in Europe; 2014 MVP of the Spanish ACB
- Josh Hutcherson – actor
- Tanner Morgan – college football quarterback, University of Minnesota

== See also ==
- Boone County Schools
- Cooper High School
- Boone County High School
- Conner High School
