= Lakeside Park, Kentucky =

- City
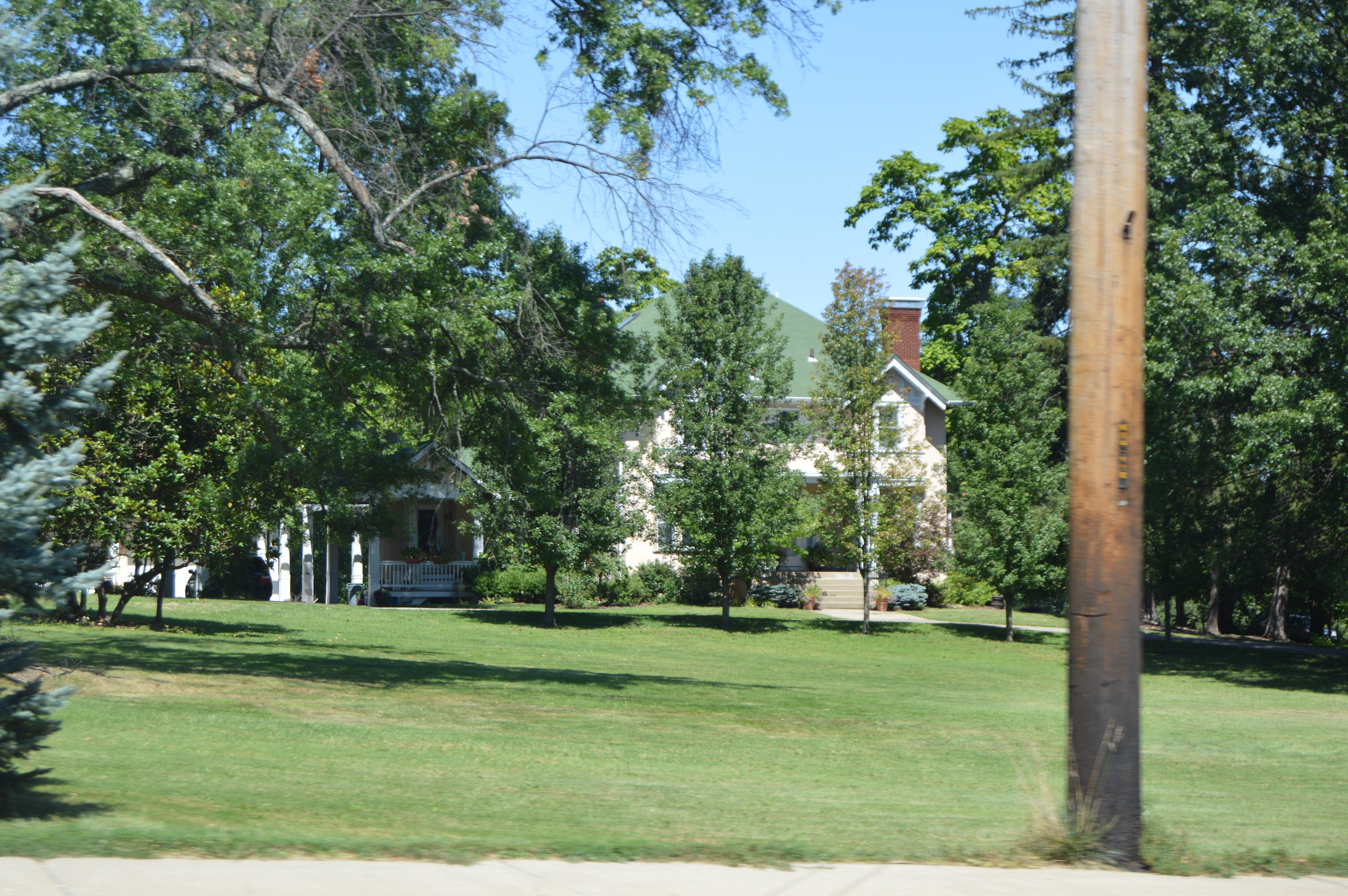
- A house in the Dixie Highway Historic District

- Location of Lakeside Park in Kenton County, Kentucky
- Coordinates: 39°02′02″N 84°34′03″W
- Country: United States
- State: Kentucky
- County: Kenton
- Incorporated: 1930

Government
  - Mayor: Paul R. Markgraf

Area
  - Total: 0.80 sq mi (2.07 km^{2})
  - Land: 0.78 sq mi (2.03 km^{2})
  - Water: 0.015 sq mi (0.04 km^{2})
- Elevation: 860 ft (260 m)

Population (2020)
  - Total: 2,841
  - Estimate (2024): 2,852
  - Density: 3,624.6/sq mi (1,399.48/km^{2})
- Time zone: UTC-5 (Eastern (EST))
  - Summer (DST): UTC-4 (EDT)
- ZIP code: 41017
- Area code: 859
- FIPS code: 21-43606
- GNIS feature ID: 2404874
- Website: https://lakesideparkky.gov/

Lakeside Park is a home rule-class city in Kenton County, Kentucky, United States. As of the 2020 census, the city had a total population of 2,841. It is a suburb in the Cincinnati metropolitan area.

== History ==
The area that is now Lakeside Park was part of a farm granted to John Leathers. During the Civil War, the Covington and Lexington Turnpike (which passes through town) was guarded by forts. Lakeside Park was incorporated in 1930. The first subdivisions were championed by Kenton County commissioner Paul Hesser, who also pushed for incorporation. It was strategically placed next to the Covington and Lexington Turnpike to prevent annexation by Fort Mitchell.

== Geography ==
According to the United States Census Bureau, the city has a total area of 0.8 square miles (2.1 km^{2}), of which 0.8 square miles (2.1 km^{2}) is land and 1.28% is water. The city is bisected by the Dixie Highway, U.S. Route 25, and Interstate 275 bypasses Lakeside Park to the south.

== Demographics ==
Historical population
| Census | Pop. | Note | %± |
|---|---|---|---|
| 1940 | 761 | | — |
| 1950 | 988 | | 29.8% |
| 1960 | 2,214 | | 124.1% |
| 1970 | 2,511 | | 13.4% |
| 1980 | 3,062 | | 21.9% |
| 1990 | 3,131 | | 2.3% |
| 2000 | 2,869 | | −8.4% |
| 2010 | 2,668 | | −7.0% |
| 2020 | 2,841 | | 6.5% |
| 2024 (est.) | 2,852 | | 0.4% |
U.S. Decennial Census

=== 2020 census ===
As of the 2020 census, Lakeside Park had a population of 2,841. The median age was 39.5 years. 21.1% of residents were under the age of 18 and 18.0% of residents were 65 years of age or older. For every 100 females there were 90.4 males, and for every 100 females age 18 and over there were 89.8 males age 18 and over.

100.0% of residents lived in urban areas, while 0.0% lived in rural areas.

There were 1,273 households in Lakeside Park, of which 27.2% had children under the age of 18 living in them. Of all households, 43.2% were married-couple households, 20.9% were households with a male householder and no spouse or partner present, and 28.8% were households with a female householder and no spouse or partner present. About 35.1% of all households were made up of individuals and 13.6% had someone living alone who was 65 years of age or older.

There were 1,330 housing units, of which 4.3% were vacant. The homeowner vacancy rate was 0.2% and the rental vacancy rate was 4.6%.

Racial composition as of the 2020 census
| Race | Number | Percent |
|---|---|---|
| White | 2,544 | 89.5% |
| Black or African American | 114 | 4.0% |
| American Indian and Alaska Native | 6 | 0.2% |
| Asian | 17 | 0.6% |
| Native Hawaiian and Other Pacific Islander | 7 | 0.2% |
| Some other race | 41 | 1.4% |
| Two or more races | 112 | 3.9% |
| Hispanic or Latino (of any race) | 76 | 2.7% |

=== 2000 census ===
As of the census of 2000, there were 2,869 people, 1,237 households, and 755 families residing in the city. The population density was 3,746.8 inhabitants per square mile (1,446.6/km^{2}). There were 1,288 housing units at an average density of 1,682.1 per square mile (649.5/km^{2}). The racial makeup of the city was 96.72% White, 1.60% African American, 0.10% Native American, 0.28% Asian, 0.59% from other races, and 0.70% from two or more races. 1.15% of the population were Hispanic or Latino of any race.

There were 1,237 households, out of which 27.4% had children under the age of 18 living with them, 49.9% were married couples living together, 8.0% had a female householder with no husband present, and 38.9% were non-families. 31.9% of all households were made up of individuals, and 12.2% had someone living alone who was 65 years of age or older. The average household size was 2.30 and the average family size was 2.95.

In the city, the population was spread out, with 23.0% under the age of 18, 10.8% from 18 to 24, 27.6% from 25 to 44, 23.4% from 45 to 64, and 15.2% who were 65 years of age or older. The median age was 37 years. For every 100 females, there were 91.0 males. For every 100 females age 18 and over, there were 85.6 males.

The median income for a household in the city was $50,781, and the median income for a family was $70,000. Males had a median income of $50,171 versus $30,329 for females. The per capita income for the city was $29,711. About 0.5% of families and 1.2% of the population were below the poverty line, including 0.1% of those under the age of 18 and 4.2% of those 65 and older.

== Education ==
Most of Lakeside Park is in the Kenton County School District. A portion of land to the east is in the Beechwood Independent School District. Beechwood ISD portions are zoned to Beechwood High School, the sole comprehensive high school of the district.
