= Skycrest, Lexington =

Neighborhood in Lexington, Kentucky

Coordinates: 38.032°N 84.536°W

Skycrest is a neighborhood in southwestern Lexington, Kentucky, United States. It takes its name from its location on a ridge between Wolf Run Creek and Vaughns Branch Creek that provides a panoramic view downtown Lexington. Its boundaries are Della Drive to the north, Beacon Hill Drive to the west, Furlong Drive and Spring Meadows Drive to the south, and Harrodsburg Road to the east.

Neighborhood statistics

- Area: 0.176 square miles (0.46 km^{2})
- Population: 781
- Population density: 4,446 people per square mile
- Median household income: $48,490
- Median age: 30.9

Public school districts

- Elementary: Picadome
- Middle: Jessie Clark
- High: Lafayette
