= KMEA =

KMEA may refer to:

- KMEA-LP, a low-power radio station (92.7 FM) licensed to Bozeman, Montana, United States
- Kentucky Music Educators Association
