= Queen of Peace High School =

Queen of Peace High School may refer to:

- Queen of Peace High School (Illinois), in Burbank, Illinois
- Queen of Peace High School (New Jersey), in North Arlington, New Jersey
