= Adair County Schools =

School district in Kentucky, U.S.

Address
- 1204 Greensburg St Columbia, Kentucky, 42728; United States

District information
- Grades: K–12
- Superintendent: Dr. Pamela Stephens
- School board: Adair County Board of Education
- NCES District ID: 2100030

Students and staff
- Enrollment: 2,650
- Student–teacher ratio: 15.08

Other information
- Website: www.adair.kyschools.us

The Adair County Schools is a public school district in Adair County, based in Columbia, Kentucky.

== Schools ==
The Adair County Schools School District has two elementary schools, one intermediate school, one middle school, and one high school. The school district's board of education building strongly resembles a pizza hut.

=== Elementary schools ===
- Adair County Primary Center
- Adair County Elementary School

=== Middle school ===
- Adair County Middle School

=== High school ===
- Adair County High School

== Adair County Board of Education ==
The school district is governed by the Adair County Board of Education, composed of five duly elected board members. As of June 2020, the board is governed by:

Name	Position
Lisa Burton	Board Chairperson
Terry Harvey	Board Vice-chairman
Daniel Adams	Board Member
Jonathan Gaskins	Board Member
Troy Grider	Board Member
