= Lafayette High School (Kentucky) =

American public school in Lexington

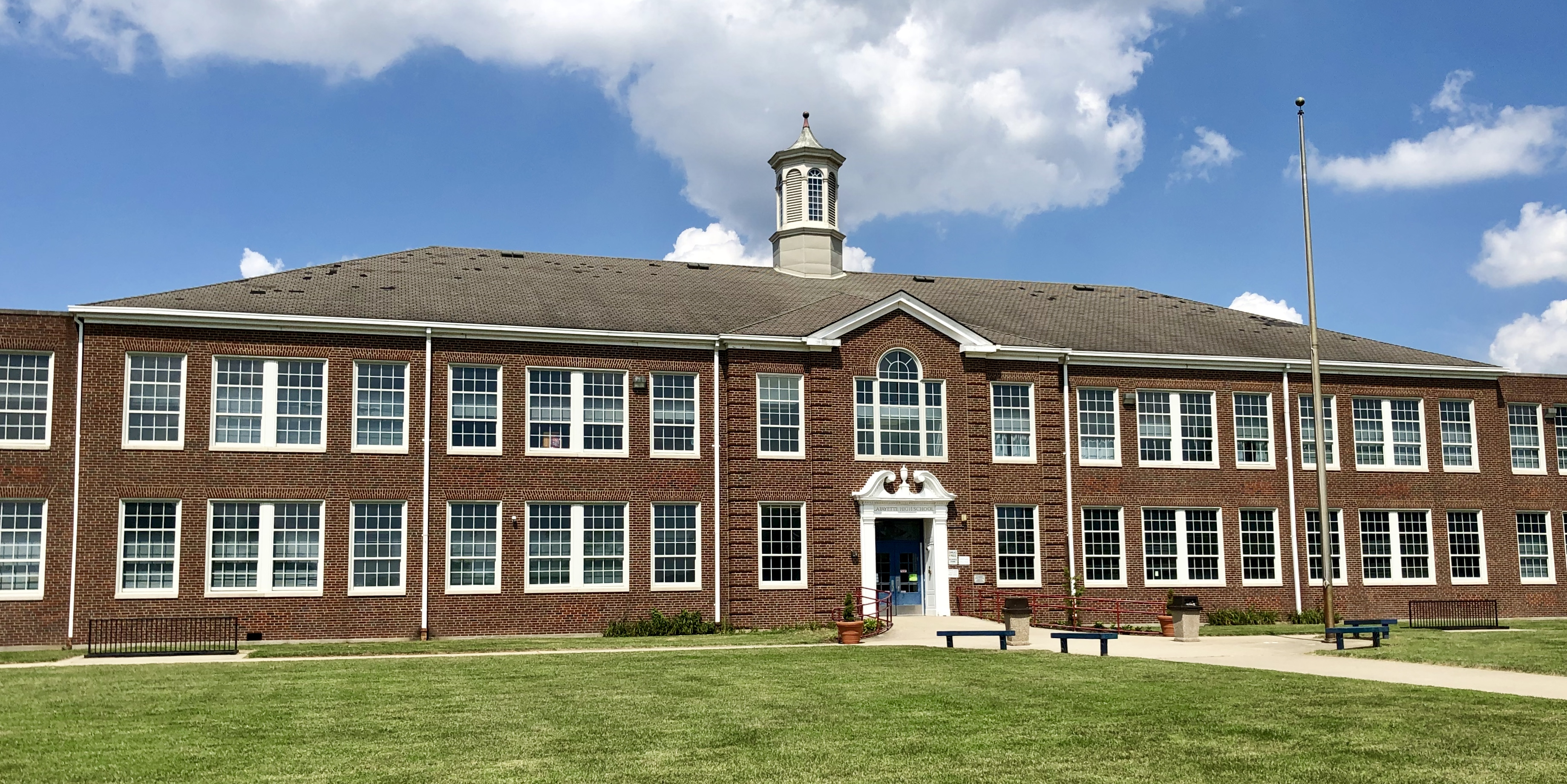
- Lafayette in August 2019

Location
- 401 Reed Ln; Lexington, Kentucky 40503; United States

Information
- School type: Public, High school
- Founded: 1939
- School district: Fayette County
- NCES School ID: 210186000367
- Principal: Anthony Orr (2022)
- Teaching staff: 130.10 FTE (2023–24 AY)
- Enrollment: 2,373 (2023–24 AY)
  - Grade 9: 25.87%
  - Grade 10: 26.97%
  - Grade 11: 25.07%
  - Grade 12: 22.08%
- Student to teacher ratio: 18.24:1 (2023–24 AY)
- Schedule type: Block scheduling
- Colors: Blue, red, and white
- Nickname: Generals
- ACT average: 22 (2018–19 AY)
- Newspaper: Lafayette Times
- Website: lafayette.fcps.net
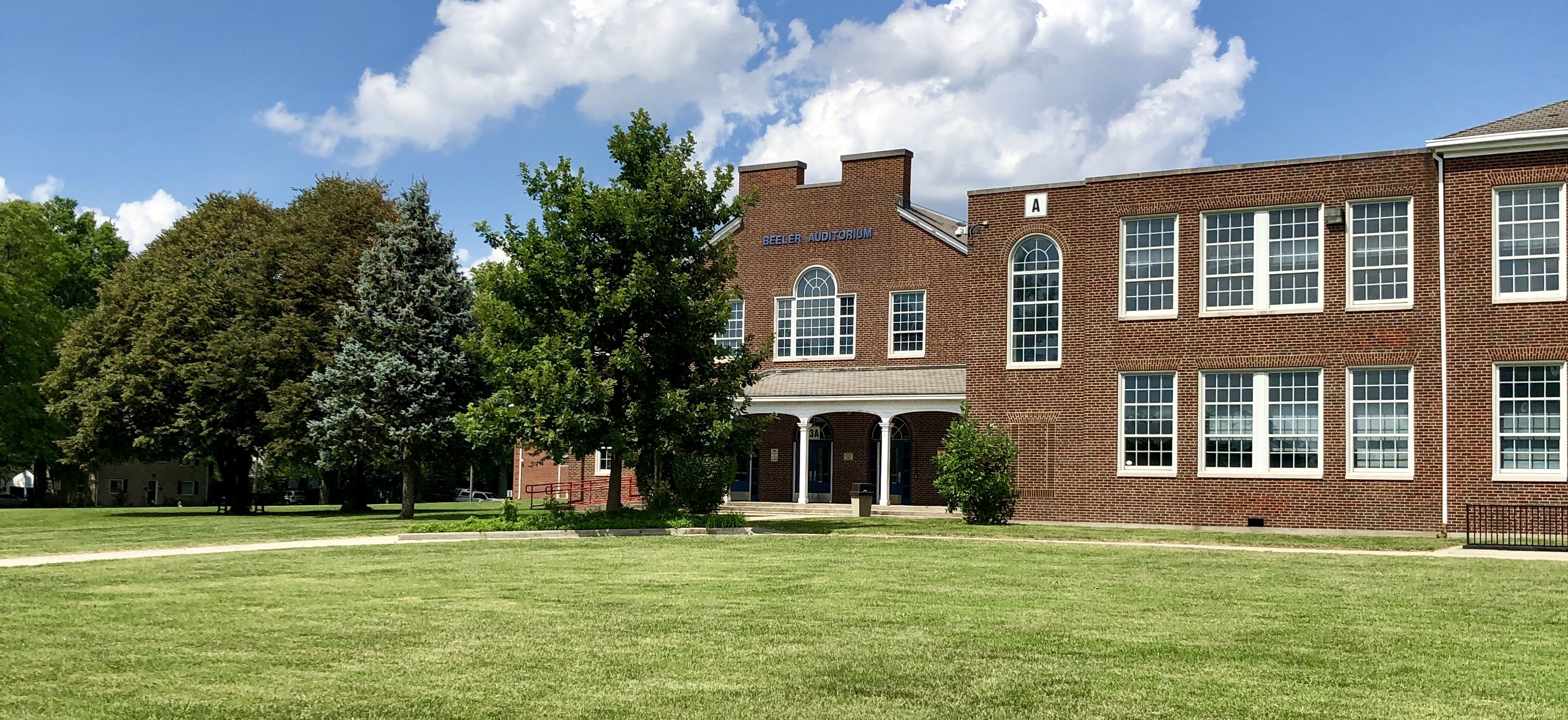
- Lafayette's northwest wing (August 2019)
- Last updated: December 27, 2024

Lafayette High School is a public high school in Lexington, Kentucky that has been open for 87 years, seen the beginning of racially-desegregated education in the city, and been overseen by at least nine principals.

== History ==
Founded in 1939 to replace Picadome High School, Lafayette High School was built on the grounds of a former orphanage with funding from the Works Progress Administration. The school was named for Gilbert du Motier, Marquis de Lafayette; the French general's family gave the school permission to use their family coat of arms as a logo. The school shared its property with a mansion—The Elms—until the latter burned down a few months into the first school year. In 1955, Lafayette was the first white school in Lexington to be racially integrated when Helen Caise Wade (a student at Lexington's all-black Douglass High School) took a summer school course in US history—she earned an A.

Dwight Price (born 1930/1931) was principal from 1972–87. After its comprehensive 1998 building renovation, Lafayette implemented block scheduling beginning with the 2000–01 academic year. In 2012, the school received its eighth principal: Memphis, Tennessee-native and University of Kentucky graduate Bryne Jacobs (born 1978/1979). Jacobs previously worked at Lexington's Paul Laurence Dunbar High School from 2000–12, and was still at Lafayette through at least the 2017–18 academic year. Renovation of the school's stadium was completed in 2010. The Lexington Herald-Leader reported in July 2022 that Anthony Orr, previously a superintendent of two Kentucky school districts, was the new Lafayette principal. In 2023, Niche ranked Lafayette as the fifth-best public high school in Kentucky, based on seven different weighted metrics.

== Demographics ==
Lafayette is part of the Fayette County Public Schools school district. In the 2023–2024 academic year, 130.10 full-time equivalent teachers made the student-to-teacher ratio 18.24:1. There were 2,373 enrolled students across grades 9–12 (614 freshmen, 640 sophomores, 595 juniors, and 524 seniors). Of that student body, 0.25% were Native American, 5.69% were Asian, 11.72% were Black, 13.7% were Hispanic, 0.04% were Pacific Islanders, 62.66% were white, and 5.94% were multiracial.

== Academics ==
As of the 2025–2026 academic year, Lafayette offers two specialized programs for its students: the School for the Creative and Performing Arts (SCAPA) and the Pre-Engineering Program. SCAPA is "designed for students who excel in art, ballet, band, contemporary dance, creative writing, drama, piano, strings, and voice", and requires an audition to be considered for the program. The latter offering is a program "designed to provide students with the skills needed to succeed in such mathematically rigorous and technical fields as engineering, architecture, medicine, computer programming, mathematics, biology, chemistry and physics."

== Extracurriculars ==
=== Athletics ===
The Lafayette boys' basketball team won the Sweet Sixteen championship in 1942, 1950, 1953, 1957, 1979, and 2001. The baseball team won the state championship in 1988, 1989, and 1992. In 2016, the Kentucky High School Athletic Association (KHSAA) audited the school and found Title IX discrepancies between the amenities offered to baseball players and softball players; to solve the problem, the school district outlaid US$2.5 million to build a field house, "new dugouts, a netted visiting hitting area, plus the resurfacing of Lafayette's track and football field."

A member of the KHSAA since 1924, as of March 2024 that organization listed Lafayette with 19 official athletic programs: archery (boys' and girls'), baseball, basketball (boys' and girls'), bowling (boys' and girls'), cheerleading, competitive dance, esports, fastpitch softball, bass fishing (boys'), American football, golf (boys' and girls'), indoor track (boys' and girls'), lacrosse (boys' and girls'), soccer (boys' and girls'), swimming (boys' and girls'), tennis (boys' and girls'), track and field (boys' and girls'), volleyball (girls'), and scholastic wrestling (boys' and girls'). The teams' colors are blue, red, and white, while the athletic nicknames are the "generals" for all gendered sports.

=== Marching band ===
The Lafayette marching band, "Pride of the Bluegrass" was awarded The Sudler Shield by the John Philip Sousa Foundation in 1991 and 1998. In 2025, the band travelled to Indianapolis Indiana for Bands Of America's Grand National Championships. The band made it to semifinals and placed 20th out of 100+ bands. On October 31, 2026, the band won its 26th Kentucky State Marching Band Championship.

== Notable alumni ==
- Gay Brewer – American professional golfer (1932–2007)
- John Y. Brown Jr. – American politician and entrepreneur (1933–2022)
- Drew Curtis – American Internet businessman (born 1973)
- Clark Janell Davis – American beauty pageant titleholder
- Ernie Fletcher – American politician (born 1952)
- Gatewood Galbraith – American attorney and author (1947–2012)
- Tyson Gay – American sprinter (born 1982)
- Tyler Guilfoil – Baseball player (born 2000)
- Tom Hammond – American sports commentator
- Vernon Hatton – American basketball player (1936–2025)
- Lucky Jackson – American football player (born 1997)
- Charles E. Johnson Jr. – Businessman convicted of fraud (born 1960s)
- Austin Kearns – American baseball player (born 1980)
- Dirk Minniefield – American basketball player (born 1961)
- Scott Pruitt – American lawyer and politician (born 1968)
- Gene Robinson – Bishop of the Episcopal Diocese of New Hampshire (born 1947)
- Colton Ryan – American actor (born 1995)
- Ben Sollee – American musician
- Harry Dean Stanton – American actor (1926–2017)
- Jock Sutherland – American basketball coach (1928–2023)
- Jim Varney – American actor and comedian (1949–2000)
- Jedrick Wills – American football player (born 1999)
- Landon Young – American football player (born 1997)
