= Beechwood Independent School District =

School district in Kentucky, United States

Beechwood Independent School District or Beechwood Independent Schools is a school district headquartered in Fort Mitchell, Kentucky, in the Cincinnati metropolitan area.

The district includes the majority of Fort Mitchell, a portion of Fort Wright, and a portion of Lakeside Park.

== History ==
In May 2015 all members of the Beechwood ISD board of trustees voted to make Mike Stacy the next superintendent. Stacy became the superintendent effective July 2015.

== Schools ==
- Beechwood High School (has middle and high school)
- Beechwood Elementary School
