= Dalton Tucker =

American football player (born 2000)

No. 68 – Indianapolis Colts
- Position: Guard
- Roster status: Active

Personal information
- Born: March 18, 2000 (age 26); Lexington, Kentucky, U.S.
- Listed height: 6 ft 6 in (1.98 m)
- Listed weight: 307 lb (139 kg)

Career information
- High school: Bourbon County (Paris, Kentucky)
- College: Marshall (2018–2023)
- NFL draft: 2024: undrafted

Career history
- Indianapolis Colts (2024–present)

Career NFL statistics as of Week 8, 2026
- Games played: 31
- Games started: 9
- Stats at Pro Football Reference

Dalton Tucker (born March 18, 2000) is an American professional football guard for the Indianapolis Colts of the National Football League (NFL), first making the team's roster as an undrafted free agent. He played college football for the Marshall Thundering Herd.

== Early life ==
Tucker was born on March 18, 2000, and grew up in Paris, Kentucky. He attended Bourbon County High School in Paris where he was a tackle and defensive end, being named honorable mention all-state and an invitee to the Blue-Grey All-American combine. A two-star recruit, he committed to play college football for the Marshall Thundering Herd over two other offers.

== College career ==
Tucker redshirted as a true freshman in 2018, appearing in two games, and then played two games again in 2019. He appeared in all 10 games with two starts in 2020, then played in 11 games with two starts in 2021, helping block for Freshman All-American Rasheen Ali. He started all 13 games at guard in 2022 and all 13 in 2023 while being named honorable mention All-Sun Belt Conference.

In his last two years at Marshall, he allowed only three sacks and 19 pressures, while being ranked 51st nationally for guards in Pro Football Focus's 2023 pass-blocking efficiency metric. In his collegiate career, Tucker appeared on close to 2,300 snaps, mainly playing right guard, although he played tackle for 608 snaps. Across his six years at Marshall, he played in 51 games with 30 starts, with 22 of those starts being at right guard, five at right tackle, and three at left tackle.

== Professional career ==
Pre-draft measurables
| Height | Weight | Arm length | Hand span | Wingspan | 40-yard dash | 10-yard split | 20-yard split | 20-yard shuttle | Three-cone drill | Vertical jump | Broad jump | Bench press |
|---|---|---|---|---|---|---|---|---|---|---|---|---|
| 6 ft 6 1/2 in (1.99 m) | 307 lb (139 kg) | 34 in (0.86 m) | 9 1/2 in (0.24 m) | 7 ft 0 1/8 in (2.14 m) | 5.19 s | 1.88 s | 3.04 s | 4.70 s | 7.64 s | 34.0 in (0.86 m) | 9 ft 4 in (2.84 m) | 22 reps |
All values from Pro Day

After going unselected in the 2024 NFL draft, Tucker signed with the Indianapolis Colts as an undrafted free agent. He impressed the team in training camp and preseason at right guard. He made the Colts' initial 53-man roster for the 2024 season.
