= Jock Sutherland (basketball) =

American basketball coach (1928–2023)

Charles "Jock" Sutherland (March 14, 1928 – November 20, 2023) is an American basketball coach from Lexington, Kentucky, who was inducted into the Kentucky Athletic Hall of Fame.

== Biography ==
Jock Sutherland was born and grew up in the shadows of the University of Kentucky's Alumni Gym and Memorial Coliseum. From an early age basketball was his first love. As a youngster he sneaked into the gym to watch Kentucky basketball practices under the legendary coach Adolph Rupp. He played high school basketball at Lafayette for coach Ralph Carlisle, and as a senior was the team's leading scorer. With Carlisle's encouragement he developed an ambition to become a high school coach.

During Sutherland's high school coaching career he took teams from three different schools to Kentucky's state high school basketball tournament (the Sweet Sixteen): Gallatin County High School in 1959, Harrison County High School in 1966 and Lafayette High School in 1979.

After his Lafayette team won the state tournament in 1979 Sutherland retired from coaching, and for twenty years worked as a color man and analyst for University of Louisville basketball broadcasts on WHAS Radio in Louisville. He remains a longtime Cardinal favorite in retirement.

As an Alabama assistant coach under C. M. Newton, he was a groundbreaker in the integration of college sports in 1969 when he recruited Wendell Hudson, the first black to participate in varsity sports for the University of Alabama.

In 1958 Reader's Digest designated Sutherland "The Quickest Thinking Coach in America."

In 1999 Sutherland was inducted into the Kentucky Athletic Hall of Fame.

Sutherland died on November 20, 2023, at the age of 95.

== Sources ==
- Jock: A Coach's Story (Wind Publications, 2010) by Stuart Warner
- Every Step of the Way: Louisville's Road to the National Championship (Falsoft, April 1987) by Jock Sutherland and John Crawley
- University of Alabama Athletics Department web site
- “Quickest Thinking State Coach? He’s Gallatin Co.’s Sutherland,” by Earl Cox, The Courier-Journal, January 12, 1958
- “Alabama Signs Black Athlete,” United Press International, April 27, 1969
