= St. Laurence High School =

Co-ed high school in Burbank, Illinois, U.S.

Location
- 5556 West 77th Street; Burbank, Cook County, Illinois 60459; United States; 41°45′14″N 87°45′36″W

Information
- Type: Private
- Motto: "Where Leadership Begins"
- Religious affiliation: Roman Catholic
- Established: 1961
- Sister school: Queen of Peace High School
- Oversight: Archdiocese of Chicago
- President: Joseph A. Martinez
- Principal: Kristy Kane
- Faculty: 111
- Teaching staff: 65.3 (on an FTE basis)
- Grades: 9–12
- Gender: Co-ed
- Enrollment: 1,180 (February 16, 2026)
- Average class size: 22
- Student to teacher ratio: 15.8
- Campus size: 23 acres (93,000 m^{2})
- Campus type: Suburban
- Colors: Black and gold
- Fight song: "Viking Fight Song"
- Athletics conference: Chicago Catholic League
- Mascot: Igor the Viking and Astrid the Viking
- Team name: Vikings
- Accreditation: North Central Association of Colleges and Schools
- Publication: Gladsheim (literary magazine)
- Newspaper: The Helm
- Yearbook: The Valhallan
- Tuition: $13,800 (2025–2026)
- Affiliation: Congregation of Christian Brothers
- Website: www.stlaurence.com

St. Laurence High School is a co-educational, STEM-based high school founded in 1961. Located in the Roman Catholic Archdiocese of Chicago, the school is conducted by the Congregation of Christian Brothers and is named for the Irish Saint Laurence O'Toole.

The school is located in the southwest Chicago suburb of Burbank, Illinois, adjacent to the property of the former Queen of Peace High School, a private, all-female Catholic high school that closed in 2017. St. Laurence became co-ed beginning with the 2017–2018 school year after Queen of Peace closed.

== History ==
St. Laurence High School was founded by the Congregation of Christian Brothers as a boys' school. With the closure of its neighboring sister school Queen of Peace High School, a girls' school run by the Dominican Sisters, the St. Laurence board of directors announced that the school would become co-educational from the 2017–2018 academic year onwards and accommodate transferring female students.

Currently, AERO Special Education Cooperative occupies the former Queen of Peace campus, with new accessible construction completed in 2023.

== Classes ==
At the start of the 2013 school year, St. Laurence became a science, technology, engineering, and mathematics (STEM) school. The school incorporates spirituality and leadership in its STEM program. Since 2016, St. Laurence has also hosted a Career Pathways program offering 11 different pathways, including aquatic science, aviation, computer science, digital advertising, education, law enforcement, and medical exploration.

In 2021, St. Laurence began an IB Diploma Programme, making it one of only three Catholic high schools in Illinois to offer the program, along with DePaul College Prep and Trinity High School.

== Athletics ==
St. Laurence is a member of the Chicago Catholic League for boys' sports and the Girls Catholic Athletic Conference for girls' sports. It is also a member of the Illinois High School Association (IHSA). St. Laurence sponsors interscholastic teams in baseball, basketball, bowling, cheer, cross country, dance, eSports, flag football, football, golf, lacrosse, soccer, softball, tennis, track and field, volleyball, and wrestling, which compete in IHSA sponsored state championship tournaments. The school also sponsors an ice hockey team.

The following teams have won IHSA state tournaments in their respective classes:

- Baseball: 3A 2025
- Football: 1976–1977, 4A 2023–2024
- Wrestling: 1989–1990

== Notable alumni ==
- Brent Bowers, former Major League Baseball (MLB) outfielder with the Baltimore Orioles
- Kevin Bracken, United States team member in Greco-Roman wrestling at the 2000 Summer Olympics
- Jimmy Dore, stand-up comedian, political commentator, podcaster, and Internet personality
- Jim Dwyer, MLB outfielder with the 1983 World Series champion Baltimore Orioles
- Tim Grunhard, high school and college football coach, National Football League (NFL) center and one-time Pro Bowl selection with the Kansas City Chiefs
- James Hickey, retired United States Army colonel involved in the capture of Iraqi dictator Saddam Hussein in December 2003
- Daniel R. Jenky, retired bishop of the Roman Catholic Diocese of Peoria; rector of the Basilica of the Sacred Heart at the University of Notre Dame; chaplain of Notre Dame's last football team to win a national championship
- Kevin J. O'Connor, film and television actor (Steel Magnolias, Color of Night, The Mummy, Van Helsing, There Will Be Blood)
- Steve Puidokas, professional basketball player in Europe and Pac-12 Conference Hall of Honor member
- Stan Smagala, college football cornerback with Notre Dame and member of its 1988 national championship team, safety with the NFL Dallas Cowboys and Pittsburgh Steelers
- Jim Stack, college basketball forward with Northwestern, executive with the NBA Minnesota Timberwolves and Chicago Bulls, broadcaster with the Big Ten Network
- John Tumpane, MLB umpire
- Jeff Vintar, motion picture screenwriter (I, Robot)
