= Beechwood High School =

School in Fort Mitchell, Kentucky, United States

Coordinates: 39°2′56″N 84°33′20″W

Location
- 54 Beechwood Road; Fort Mitchell, KY 41017; United States

Information
- Established: 1933 (officially), founded 1858
- School district: Beechwood Independent School District
- Superintendent: Justin Kaiser
- Principal: Jessica Pass
- Faculty: 39.00 (FTE)
- Grades: 7 to 12
- Enrollment: 746 (2023–2024)
- Student to teacher ratio: 19.01
- Campus: Suburban
- Colors: Red and White
- Mascot: Beechwood Tiger
- Nickname: Tigers
- Accreditation: Blue Ribbon 2013
- Feeder schools: Beechwood Elementary School
- Website: Official website

Beechwood High School is a 6-year 7–12th grade high school, located in Fort Mitchell, Kentucky, United States. It is a part of the Beechwood Independent School

The district (of which Beechwood HS is the sole comprehensive high school) includes the majority of Fort Mitchell, a portion of Fort Wright, and a portion of Lakeside Park.

== General information ==
Beechwood High School, founded 1860, is operated by an "independent" school district, which in Kentucky refers to a district that is independent of a county. Most school districts in the state coincide exactly with county boundaries. The Beechwood district is run by superintendent Justin Kaiser. Beechwood High School is consistently one of the highest-rated schools in Kentucky. This school is a relatively small with roughly 115 students in each graduating class. The school's mascot is the Tiger. Although the high school is listed as 7th-12th grade, an elementary (grades K-6) also exists in a connected building. These two schools make up the Beechwood Independent School District.

== Awards and recognition ==
They have been ranked one of the best high schools in the nation by U.S. News & World Report in 2008.

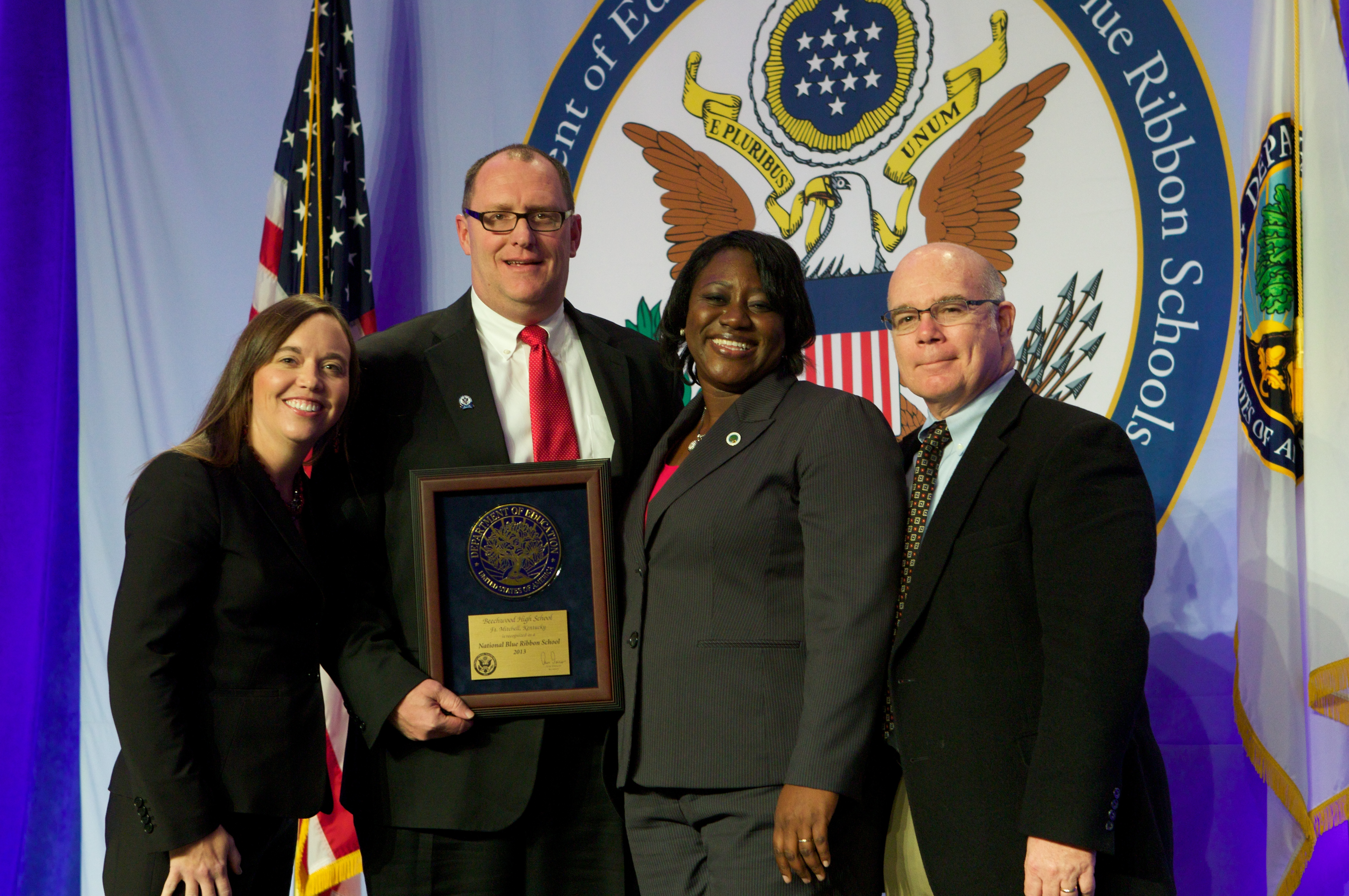
2013 National Blue Ribbon Schools winner

== Athletics ==
The school has historically fielded the following teams: Football, Boys' and Girls' track, Boys' and Girls' Cross Country, Archery, Boys' and Girls Basketball, Baseball, Fastpitch Softball, Girls' and Boys' swimming, Boys' and Girls' Golf, Boys' and Girls' Tennis, Volleyballs, and Girls' Soccer. The school has also recently added an Esports team.

=== Football ===
- 18-time KHSAA champions
- Class A: 1984, 1991, 1992, 1993, 1994, 1996, 1997, 1999, 2004, 2007, 2008, 2016, 2017, 2018
- Class AA: 2020, 2021, 2022, 2024

=== Girls' Cross County ===
- 2022, 2023

=== Girls' Track and Field ===
- 2019, 2022, 2024

=== Boys' Track and Field ===
- 2024

=== Rocket League (Esports) ===
- Spring 2022

=== Football ===
Beechwood built a dominant football program in the 1990s under head coach Mike Yeagle. Accumulating 7 state titles, 3 undefeated seasons, and a Northern Kentucky record 38 consecutive wins all within the decade, the Tigers were the most successful team in the state from 1990 to 1999 in both wins (126) and winning percentage (.893). Beechwood carried their winning tradition into the new millennium by winning back-to-back state titles in 2007 and 2008 under new head coach Noel Rash, soon after forming an active streak of three consecutive state championships from 2016 to 2018 and the first 2A state championship in school history in 2020.

- 2024 State Champion (14–1)
- 2022 State Champion (14–1)
- 2021 State Champion (15–0)
- 2020 State Champion (10–2)
- 2018 State Champion (13–2)
- 2017 State Champion (13–2)
- 2016 State Champion (14–1)
- 2008 State Champion (14–1)
- 2007 State Champion (13–2)
- 2004 State Champion (14–1)
- 1999 State Champion (13–2)
- 1997 State Champion (14–0)
- 1996 State Champion (12–2)
- 1994 State Champion (15–0)
- 1993 State Champion (11–3)
- 1992 State Champion (13–1)
- 1991 State Champion (15–0)
- 1984 State Champion (13–0)

== Band program ==
The Beechwood band program is the largest activity on the Beechwood Schools campus encompassing nearly 250 students from 5th to 12th grade. The band program includes the national award-winning Marching Tigers, high school symphonic band, high school percussion ensemble, jazz ensemble, jazz lab band, middle school bands, pep bands, chamber ensembles, and winter guards. The band program is under the direction of Austin Bralley and Savannah Starks.

=== Winter Guard ===
The Beechwood High School Varsity Winter Guard is one of the most successful guard programs in Kentucky. The Beechwood Varsity Winter Guard competes in Tri-State Marching Arts as well as Winter Guard International. Recently, the Varsity Winter Guard was the TMA Regional A Gold Medalists in 2017 and 2018.

=== Marching Tigers ===
The Marching Tigers have been named KMEA State Champions 12 times and the Bands of America Class A National Championship two times (2006, 2011). In 2019, the Marching Tigers represented the Commonwealth of Kentucky in the National Memorial Day Parade in Washington DC. The Marching Tigers were awarded the John Philip Sousa Foundation Sudler Shield in 2022.

- KMEA State Champions
  - Class 1A – 1990, 2006, 2010, 2011, 2012, 2013, 2015, 2016
  - Class 2A – 2019, 2021, 2023, 2025
- KMEA State Finalist
  - Class 1A - 1986, 1990, 2005, 2006, 2007, 2008, 2009, 2010, 2011, 2012, 2013, 2014, 2015, 2016, 2017, 2018
  - Class 2A - 1987, 1988, 1991, 1992, 2019, 2021, 2023, 2024, 2025
  - Class 3A - 1996, 2022
- Bands of America National Champions
  - Class 1A - 2006, 2011
- Bands of America National Semifinalists
  - 2006, 2008, 2011, 2013, 2015, 2017, 2019, 2022, 2023

== Notable alumni ==
- Brandon Berger, former Kansas City Royals outfielder
