= Grant County High School =

Location
- 715 Warsaw Road; Dry Ridge, KY 41035; USA; 38°41′08″N 84°37′17″W

Information
- Type: Public high school
- Motto: "Advancing Knowledge. Activating Momentum."
- Established: 1954
- School district: Grant County Schools
- Principal: Bryley Murphy
- Faculty: 118
- Teaching staff: 57.00 (FTE)
- Grades: 9 – 12
- Enrollment: 1,062 (2023-2024)
- Student to teacher ratio: 18.63
- Hours in school day: 5 (8:05am – 2:55pm)
- Campus size: 51 acres (21 ha)
- Color
- Nickname: Braves and Lady Braves
- Rival: Williamstown, Simon Kenton
- Accreditation: Southern Association of Colleges and Schools (SACS)
- Yearbook: Grantonian
- Feeder schools: Grant County Middle School
- Website: https://www.grant.kyschools.us/o/gchs

Grant County High School is a public high school serving the ninth through twelfth grades in Grant County, Kentucky, USA. It is one of seven schools and the only high school in the Grant County Schools district.

== School information ==
The school was formed in 1954 as the result of the merger of the county's four previous high schools Corinth, Mason, Dry Ridge, and Crittenden. The current Grant County High School building was dedicated in 1998. The campus covers 51 acres (210,000 m^{2}). Computer terminals are available in each classroom. Three computer labs are available for student use along with a media center with Internet access.

The student-teacher ratio is 18, which exceeds the state average of 15. Spending per pupil is $6,639, less than the state average of $7,639.

=== Grading scale ===
- A = 90–100
- B = 80–89
- C = 70–79
- D = 60–69
- F = 0–59

=== Bell schedule ===
The GCHS schedule consist of five roughly 65-minute-long class periods, along with a 25-minute enrichment time that is used for various prep courses depending on a student's grades and test proficiency; the worthiness of this time is a source of debate for many students and faculty.

== Extracurricular activities ==
=== Athletics ===
Athletics at Grant County includes:

- Archery
- Baseball
- Boys' basketball
- Girls' basketball
- Bass fishing
- Cheerleading
- Cross country
- Football
- Golf
- Marching Band (multiple State Championships in the 90's)
- Boys' soccer
- Girls' soccer
- Softball
- Tennis
- Track and field
- Volleyball
- Wrestling
- FFA

=== Clubs and organizations ===
Students participate in several clubs and organizations, including:

- Future Business Leaders of America (FBLA)
- Future Farmers of America (FFA)
- Future, Career, and Community Leaders of America (FCCLA) Formerly Future Homemakers of America (FHA)
- National Honor Society (NHS)
- National English Honor Society (NEHS)
- Mu Alpha Theta
- National Art Honor Society (NAHS)
- Science National Honor Society (SNHS)
- Junior Reserve Officers' Training Corps (JROTC)
- Academic Team
- Future Problem Solving (FPS)
- Technology Student Association (TSA)
- TSA Vex robotics
- Skills USA
- Heath Occupations Students of America (HOSA)
- Fellowship of Christian Athletes (FCA)
- Student Council
- Pep Club
- Marching Band
- Concert Band

== Performance ==
The high school is accredited by Southern Association of Colleges and Schools. Over forty percent of the student population is classified as "Academic Achievers," who achieve at high levels, attend school regularly, and exhibit exemplary behavior. There was once a program for the Academic Achievers, but that program has since been done away with. In 2006-2007 students took Advanced Placement (AP) examinations in 11 of the 37 course areas. As of the 2017–2018 school year, however, there are only 4 AP course available to the student. To some degree this is because of the administration encouraging dual credit college classes over AP.
