= Fort Mitchell, Kentucky =

- City
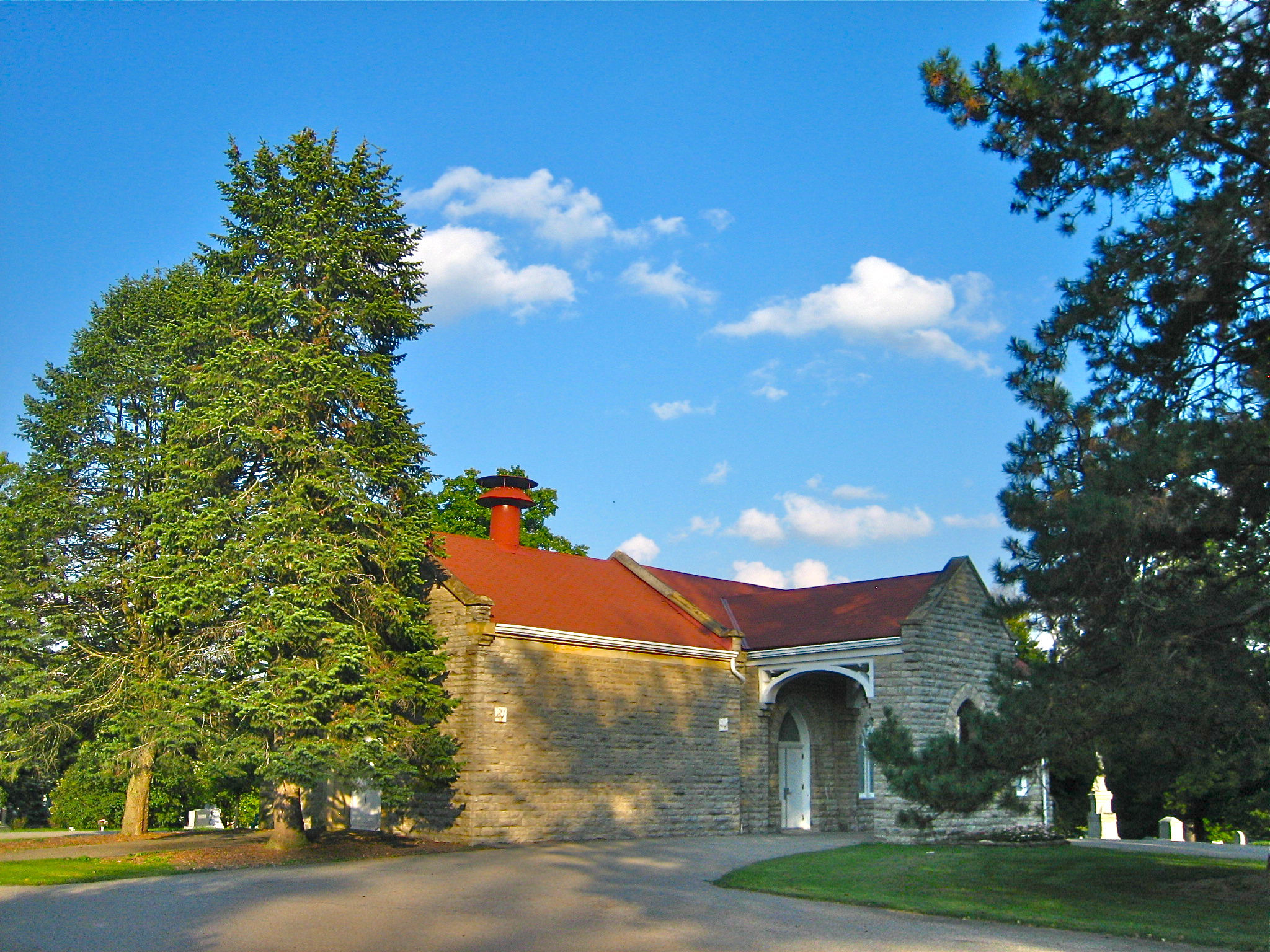
- Chapel at Highland Cemetery

- Flag Seal

- Location of Fort Mitchell in Kenton County, Kentucky.
- Coordinates: 39°02′45″N 84°33′22″W
- Country: United States
- State: Kentucky
- County: Kenton
- Incorporated: February 14, 1910

Government
  - Type: Mayor-Council
  - Mayor: Jude Hehman

Area
  - Total: 3.12 sq mi (8.07 km^{2})
  - Land: 3.10 sq mi (8.02 km^{2})
  - Water: 0.019 sq mi (0.05 km^{2})
- Elevation: 830 ft (250 m)

Population (2020)
  - Total: 8,702
  - Estimate (2022): 8,653
  - Density: 2,809.4/sq mi (1,084.71/km^{2})
- Time zone: UTC-5 (Eastern (EST))
  - Summer (DST): UTC-4 (EDT)
- ZIP codes: 41011, 41017
- Area code: 859
- FIPS code: 21-28558
- GNIS feature ID: 2403642
- Website: fortmitchell.com

Fort Mitchell is a home rule-class city in Kenton County, Kentucky, United States. The population was 8,702 at the 2020 census. It is part of the Cincinnati metropolitan area.

== History ==
Fort Mitchell was the site of one of seven Civil War fortifications built for the Defense of Cincinnati. The community was named for General Ormsby M. Mitchel, a professor at Cincinnati College (now the University of Cincinnati) who designed the fortifications.

Fort Mitchell was chartered as a city in 1910. It annexed South Ft. Mitchell (inc. 1927) in 1967 and Crescent Park in 1999.

Fort Mitchell is often referred to as "Titletown," a nickname earned through the many KHSAA state championships won by Beechwood High School's athletic teams, as well as numerous KMEA state titles earned by its band.

== Geography ==
According to the United States Census Bureau, the city has a total area of 3.1 square miles (8.0 km^{2}), all land.

== Demographics ==
Historical population
Census	Pop.	Note	%±
1910	80		—
1920	169		111.3%
1930	359		112.4%
1940	705		96.4%
1950	372		−47.2%
1960	525		41.1%
1970	6,982		1,229.9%
1980	7,294		4.5%
1990	7,438		2.0%
2000	8,089		8.8%
2010	8,207		1.5%
2020	8,702		6.0%
2024 (est.)	8,766		0.7%
U.S. Decennial Census

=== 2020 census ===
As of the 2020 census, Fort Mitchell had a population of 8,702. The median age was 36.2 years. 25.5% of residents were under the age of 18 and 13.8% of residents were 65 years of age or older. For every 100 females there were 95.7 males, and for every 100 females age 18 and over there were 94.2 males age 18 and over.

100.0% of residents lived in urban areas, while 0.0% lived in rural areas.

There were 3,565 households in Fort Mitchell, of which 33.0% had children under the age of 18 living in them. Of all households, 44.4% were married-couple households, 20.6% were households with a male householder and no spouse or partner present, and 28.9% were households with a female householder and no spouse or partner present. About 31.7% of all households were made up of individuals and 10.6% had someone living alone who was 65 years of age or older.

There were 3,747 housing units, of which 4.9% were vacant. The homeowner vacancy rate was 1.2% and the rental vacancy rate was 5.0%.

Racial composition as of the 2020 census
Race	Number	Percent
White	7,555	86.8%
Black or African American	338	3.9%
American Indian and Alaska Native	8	0.1%
Asian	149	1.7%
Native Hawaiian and Other Pacific Islander	1	0.0%
Some other race	166	1.9%
Two or more races	485	5.6%
Hispanic or Latino (of any race)	433	5.0%

=== 2010 census ===
At the 2010 census, there were 8,207 people, 3,530 households, and 2,033 families living in the city. The population density was 2,581.8 inhabitants per square mile (996.8/km^{2}). There were 3,744 housing units at an average density of 1,195.0 per square mile (461.4/km^{2}). The racial makeup of the city was 96.87% White, 0.99% African American, 0.10% Native American, 0.80% Asian, 0.02% Pacific Islander, 0.47% from other races, and 0.74% from two or more races. Hispanic or Latino of any race were 0.85% of the population.

Of the 3,446 households 28.9% had children under the age of 18 living with them, 45.2% were married couples living together, 9.3% had a female householder with no husband present, and 42.4% were non-families. 35.6% of households were one person and 11.3% were one person aged 65 or older. The average household size was 2.29 and the average family size was 3.05.

The age distribution was 23.9% under 18, 9.9% from 18 to 24, 30.4% from 25 to 44, 22.6% from 45 to 64, and 13.3% who were 65 or older. The median age was 36 years. For every 100 females, there were 90.8 males. For every 100 females age 18 and over, there were 86.4 males.

The median household income was $46,335 and the median family income was $63,910. Full-time male workers had a median income of $41,358 versus $29,873 for females. The per capita income for the city was $29,229. As of the 2000 census, about 2.6% of families and 3.4% of the population were below the poverty line, including 2.7% of those under age 18 and 2.4% of those age 65 or over.

=== 2000 census ===
At the 2000 census there were 8,089 people, 3,530 households, and 2,033 families living in the city. The population density was 2,581.8 inhabitants per square mile (996.8/km^{2}). There were 3,744 housing units at an average density of 1,195.0 per square mile (461.4/km^{2}). The racial makeup of the city was 96.87% White, 0.99% African American, 0.10% Native American, 0.80% Asian, 0.02% Pacific Islander, 0.47% from other races, and 0.74% from two or more races. Hispanic or Latino of any race were 0.85%.

Of the 3,530 households 28.9% had children under the age of 18 living with them, 45.2% were married couples living together, 9.3% had a female householder with no husband present, and 42.4% were non-families. 35.6% of households were one person and 11.3% were one person aged 65 or older. The average household size was 2.29 and the average family size was 3.05.

The age distribution was 23.9% under the age of 18, 9.9% from 18 to 24, 30.4% from 25 to 44, 22.6% from 45 to 64, and 13.3% 65 or older. The median age was 36 years. For every 100 females, there were 90.8 males. For every 100 females age 18 and over, there were 86.4 males.

The median household income was $46,335 and the median family income was $63,910. Males had a median income of $41,358 versus $29,873 for females. The per capita income for the city was $29,229. About 2.6% of families and 3.4% of the population were below the poverty line, including 2.7% of those under age 18 and 2.4% of those age 65 or over.

== Culture ==
- The Vent Haven Museum in Fort Mitchell claims to be the world's only Ventriloquism museum.

== Education ==
Almost all of Fort Mitchell is within the Beechwood Independent School District, a public K-12 institution. A small portion to the southwest is in the Kenton County School District.

Blessed Sacrament is a Catholic K-8 institution.

Beechwood High School was ranked #333 on the U.S. News & World Report 2015 list of best high schools nationwide.

== Notable people ==
- A. M. Edwards, lawyer and statesman who served as Secretary of Guam from 1960 to 1961 (buried in Fort Mitchell)
- Ryan Poston, murder victim (born in Fort Mitchell)
