= Queen of Peace High School (Illinois) =

Location
- 7659 Linder Avenue; Burbank, Illinois 60459; United States; 41°45′13″N 87°45′27″W

Information
- Type: Private, college-preparatory high school
- Religious affiliation: Roman Catholic
- Established: 1962
- Founders: Sinsinawa Dominican Sisters
- Closed: June 30, 2017
- Sister school: St. Laurence High School
- Oversight: Roman Catholic Archdiocese of Chicago
- NCES School ID: 00343853
- Principal: Hedi Belkaoui
- Teaching staff: 25.3 (on an FTE basis)
- Grades: 9–12
- Gender: Girls
- Enrollment: 298 (2015–2016)
- Student to teacher ratio: 11.8
- Colors: Green, white, black
- Athletics conference: Girls Catholic Athletic Association
- Nickname: Pride
- Accreditation: North Central Association of Colleges and Schools
- Publication: Mosaic (Literary Magazine)
- Newspaper: Amity
- Yearbook: Pace
- Website: www.queenofpeacehs.org

Queen of Peace High School was a private, Roman Catholic, college-preparatory high school for girls in Burbank, Illinois, United States. It was established in 1962 by the Sinsinawa Dominican Sisters and was located in the Roman Catholic Archdiocese of Chicago. It closed on June 30, 2017, due to an extended enrollment decline and financial shortfalls.

== History ==
Queen of Peace High School was established in 1962 by the Sinsinawa Dominican Sisters. It used St. Laurence High School for the 1962–63 school year due to construction delays, and began classes in its own newly built facility in September 1963. The school closed on June 30, 2017, due to an extended enrollment decline and financial shortfalls.

== Notable alumnae ==
- Delilah DiCrescenzo, distance runner
- Jacqueline Janota, softball player
- Robin Baumgarten, television news personality
- Magdelena (Maggie) Strzepka, member of Season 17's winning team, Wally's Waffles, on Food Network's The Great Food Truck Race
- Ally Judd, lead aesthetician at SpaDerma
