= Bourbon County High School =

Public high school in Paris, Kentucky

Location
- 3341 Lexington Road, Paris, Bourbon County, Kentucky; United States; 38°11′39″N 84°16′26″W

Information
- Former name: Bourbon County Vocational High School
- Type: Public
- Founded: 1948
- School district: Bourbon County Schools
- NCES District ID: 2100540
- NCES School ID: 210054000098
- Principal: Morgan Adkins
- Teaching staff: 41.19 (on a FTE basis)
- Grades: 9-12
- Enrollment: 796 (2023–2024)
- Student to teacher ratio: 19.33
- Color
- Nickname: Colonels
- Newspaper: Le Petit Colonel
- Website: bchs.bourbon.kyschools.us

Bourbon County High School is a public high school in Paris, Kentucky. It is in the Bourbon County Schools system.

== About ==
Bourbon County High School offers classes for grades 9 thorough 12, and had 816 students enrolled in the 2021 to 2022 school year. This is a Title I school. In the 2020 to 2021 school year, 52.7% of the students are economically disadvantaged. The school has 15 departments: Academics, Adult Ed, Attendance/ Enrollment, Community Ed, ELL Resources, Family Resource, Finance, Food Service, Human Resources, Maintenance, Migrant Education, Special Education, Talented/Gifted, Technology, and Transportation.

The student newspaper is called the Le Petit Colonel. In 2022, the Bourbon County High School Marching Band performed at the Macy's Thanksgiving Day Parade in New York City.

== History ==
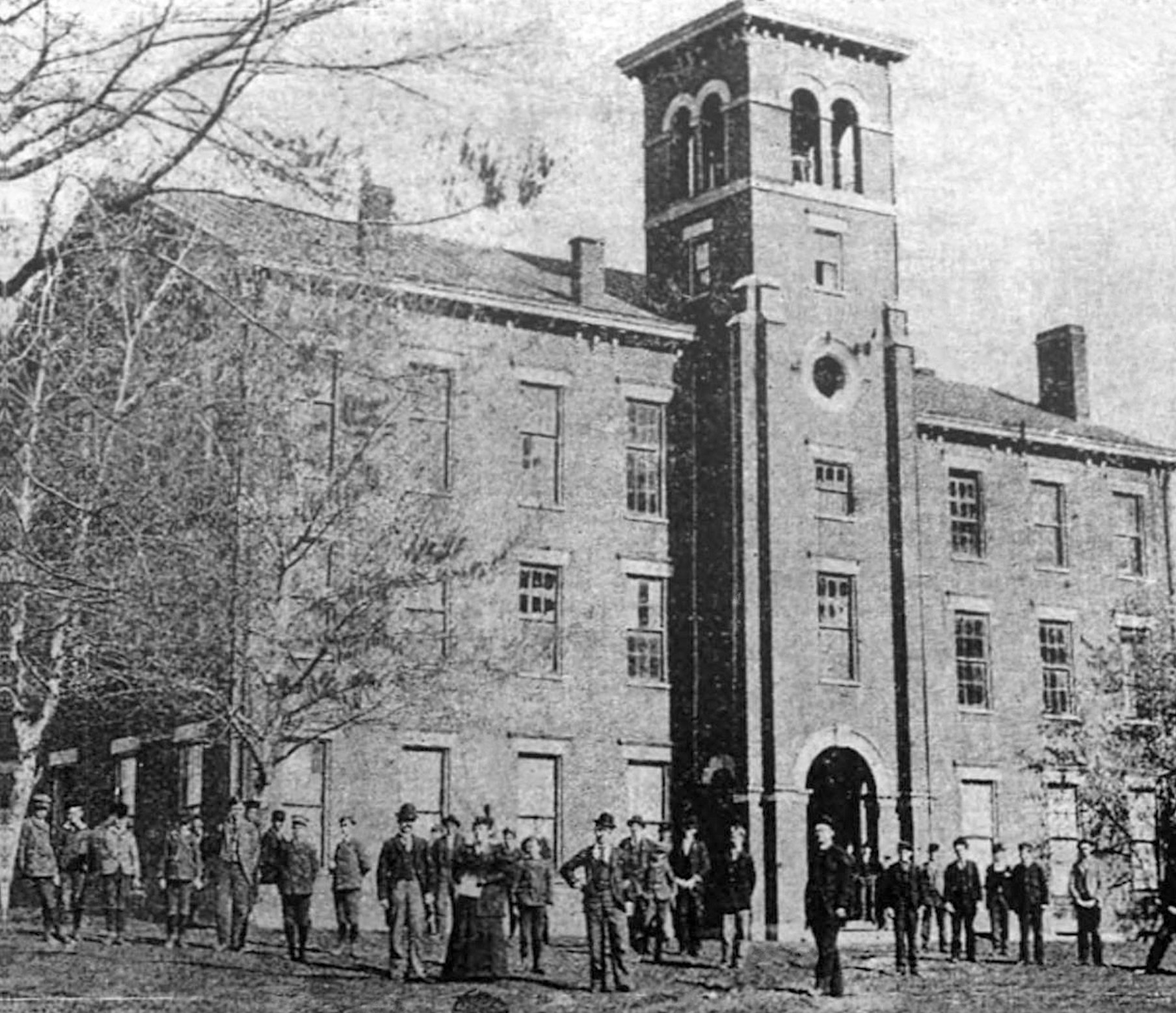
Bourbon County High School at Millersburg building, it was active from 1920 to 1948

=== Pre-history and Bourbon County High School at Millersburg ===
A precursor to the current Bourbon County High School was the Bourbon County High School at Millersburg, founded in 1920 and located in Millersburg. The Bourbon County High School at Millersburg operated from approximately 1911 until 1948, and was located in a building from 1858 originally designed for use by Kentucky Wesleyan College (until they moved in 1890).

However the school's graduates represented only a fraction of the population of Bourbon County due to its location in the northeastern portion of the county. Little Rock, Center Hill, Clintonville, and North Middletown also maintained high schools within the Bourbon County School System. In an effort to create a more centralized environment, the upper grades of Millersburg, Little Rock, Clintonville, and Center Hill schools were merged to create the Bourbon County Vocational High School. North Middletown, however, retained its high school for several more years.

=== Bourbon County Vocational High School ===
The Bourbon County Vocational High School opened in the fall of 1948, on the site of the present middle school facility. The central high school was renamed Bourbon County High School in 1956, and completed consolidation with North Middletown High School in 1964 to become the sole high school in the county school district.

Several classrooms, a new library, and a cafeteria were added and by 1968 a junior high school was also built on the campus. In 1981, the high school and junior high switched buildings to locate BCHS at its present site.

== Notable alumni ==
- Jim Kelly (1964), actor and martial artist
- Rick Massie (1978), NFL wide receiver
- Sannie Overly (1985), former chair of the Kentucky Democratic Party
- Matthew Koch (1996), member of the Kentucky House of Representatives
- Dalton Tucker (2018), NFL offensive guard
