= Kentucky Music Educators Association =

Kentucky Music Educators Association (KMEA) is the Kentucky state-level affiliate of The National Association for Music Education. KMEA consists of over 1,000 professional music educators at all levels from kindergarten to the university level.

== Programs ==
=== Choruses ===
Kentucky high school students are provided the opportunity to participate in the Kentucky All-State Choruses [SATB, SSAA, TTBB]. For elementary and middle school children, KMEA offers the Kentucky Children's Chorus for grades 5–6, and two Kentucky Junior High Choruses for grades 7–9: a treble chorus and a mixed chorus.

=== Bands and orchestras ===
Kentucky high school students also are provided the opportunity to participate in All-State Bands (Concert, Symphonic, Jazz), and the All-State Symphony Orchestra or the Commonwealth String Orchestra, for which the students are chosen from a rigorous audition on their instruments.

=== Marching band ===
See Kentucky State Marching Band Championships

See List of marching bands in Kentucky

=== Assessments ===
KMEA provides opportunities for students to receive ratings for their performances as soloists or in small ensembles at district-level sites throughout the Commonwealth in what are called Solo and Ensemble Assessments. Qualified evaluators rate student performances and offer suggestions for improvement of their playing skills. For a student to participate in such an event, their music teacher must be a Kentucky Music Educators Association member. Large Ensemble Assessment allow bands, orchestras, and choral groups to play for evaluation at district-level sites. Bands or choirs receiving Distinguished (I) ratings may participate in the State Concert Band or State Choral Assessments held later in the spring of each year.
