= Adair County High School (Kentucky) =

Location
- 526 Indian Drive; Columbia, Kentucky 42728; United States; 37°6′14″N 85°19′30″W

Information
- Type: Public
- School district: Adair County Schools
- Principal: Chad Parnell
- Teaching staff: 57.50 (on an FTE basis)
- Grades: 9-12
- Enrollment: 796 (2023–2024)
- Student to teacher ratio: 13.84
- Colors: Red, white, and blue
- Mascot: Indian
- Website: Adair County High School website

Adair County High School is a United States high school (grades 9 to 12) in the small town of Columbia, Adair County, Kentucky, United States. It is the only high school of the county.
