= List of high schools in Kentucky =

This is a list of high schools in the state of Kentucky.

If a school's mailing address differs from its physical location, the postal location is in parentheses.

Also, if necessary, the schools are split into public and private, and also by district. Note that Kentucky has two types of public school districts: county districts, styled "XXXX County (Public) Schools" or in some cases "XXXX County School District"; and independent districts, which have varying styles with the common element of not including the word "County". Unless specified, public schools are affiliated with their associated county district.

== Adair County ==
- Adair County High School, Columbia

== Allen County ==
=== Scottsville ===
- Allen County Scottsville High School (Allen County Schools)
- East End Christian Academy (Private)

== Anderson County ==
=== Lawrenceburg ===
- Anderson County High School (Anderson County Schools)
- Christian Academy of Lawrenceburg (Private)

== Ballard County ==
- Ballard Memorial High School, Barlow

== Barren County ==
=== Glasgow ===
- Barren County High School (Barren County Schools)
- Glasgow High School (Glasgow Independent Schools)
- Glasgow Christian Academy (Private)

Note: The Caverna Independent Schools district includes a portion of northwest Barren County, as well as a part of southern Hart County. The district's headquarters and its elementary school are in Cave City, in Barren County, while its middle and high school is located in Horse Cave, in Hart County.

== Bath County ==
- Bath County High School, Owingsville

== Bell County ==
- Middlesboro High School, Middlesboro (Middlesboro Independent Schools)
- Red Bird Christian School, Beverly (Private)

=== Pineville ===
- Bell County High School (Bell County Schools)
- Pineville High School (Pineville Independent Schools)

== Boone County ==
- Conner High School, Hebron (Boone County Schools)
- St. Henry District High School, Erlanger (Private)
- Walton-Verona High School, Walton (Walton-Verona Independent Schools)

=== Florence ===
- Boone County High School (Boone County Schools)
- Heritage Academy Christian School (Private)

=== Union ===
- Larry A. Ryle High School (Boone County Schools)
- Randall K. Cooper High School (Boone County Schools)

== Bourbon County ==
=== Paris ===
- Bourbon County High School (Bourbon County Schools)
- Paris High School (Paris Independent Schools)
- Bourbon Christian Academy (Private)

== Boyd County ==
- Fairview High School, Westwood (Fairview Independent Schools)
- Ramey-Estep High School, Rush (Boyd County Public Schools)

=== Ashland ===
- Paul G. Blazer High School (Ashland Independent School District)
- Boyd County High School (Boyd County Public Schools)
- Rose Hill Christian School (Private)

== Boyle County ==
=== Danville ===
- Boyle County High School (Boyle County School District)
- Danville Christian Academy (Private)
- Danville High School (Danville Schools)
- Kentucky School for the Deaf (State-operated)

== Bracken County ==
- Augusta High School, Augusta (Augusta Independent Schools)
- Bracken County High School, Brooksville (Bracken County Schools)

== Breathitt County ==
- Riverside Christian School, Lost Creek (Private)

=== Jackson ===
- Breathitt County High School (Breathitt County Schools)
- Jackson City School (Jackson Independent Schools)
- Mt. Carmel School (Private)
- Oakdale Christian Academy (Private)

== Breckinridge County ==
- Breckinridge County High School, Harned (Breckinridge County Schools)
- Frederick Fraize High School, Cloverport (Cloverport Independent Schools)

== Bullitt County ==
- Bullitt Central High School, Shepherdsville
- Bullitt East High School, Mount Washington
- North Bullitt High School, Hebron Estates

== Butler County ==
- Butler County High School, Morgantown

== Caldwell County ==
- Caldwell County High School, Princeton

== Calloway County ==
=== Murray ===
- Calloway County High School (Calloway County Schools)
- Murray High School (Murray Independent Schools)

== Campbell County ==
- Bellevue High School, Bellevue (Bellevue Independent Schools)
- Dayton High School, Dayton (Dayton Independent Schools)
- Highlands High School, Fort Thomas (Fort Thomas Independent Schools)

=== Alexandria ===
- Bishop Brossart High School (Private)
- Campbell County High School (Campbell County Schools)

=== Newport ===
- Newport High School (Newport Independent Schools)
- Newport Central Catholic High School (Private)

== Carlisle County ==
- Carlisle County High School, Bardwell

== Carroll County ==
=== Carrollton ===
- Carroll County High School (Carroll County Public Schools)
- Christian Academy of Carrollton (Private)

== Carter County ==
- East Carter High School, Grayson
- West Carter High School, Olive Hill

== Casey County ==
- Casey County High School, Liberty

== Christian County ==
=== Hopkinsville ===
- Christian County High School (Christian County Public Schools)
- Gateway Academy to Innovation & Technology (Christian County Public Schools)
- Heritage Christian Academy (Private)
- Hopkinsville High School (Christian County Public Schools)
- University Heights Academy (Private)

== Clark County ==
- George Rogers Clark High School, Winchester

== Clay County ==
- Clay County High School, Manchester (Clay County Schools)
- Oneida Baptist Institute, Oneida (Private)

== Clinton County ==
- Clinton County High School, Albany

== Crittenden County ==
- Crittenden County High School, Marion

== Cumberland County ==
- Cumberland County High School, Burkesville

== Daviess County ==
- Trinity High School, Whitesville (Private)

=== Owensboro ===
- Apollo High School (Daviess County Schools)
- Daviess County High School (Daviess County Schools)
- Owensboro Catholic High School (Private)
- Owensboro High School (Owensboro Public Schools)

== Edmonson County ==
- Edmonson County High School, Brownsville

== Elliott County ==
- Elliott County High School, Sandy Hook

== Estill County ==
- Estill County High School, Irvine

== Fayette County ==
=== Lexington ===
==== Fayette County Public Schools ====
- Bryan Station High School
- Eastside Technical Center
- Frederick Douglass High School
- Henry Clay High School
- Lafayette High School
- Paul Laurence Dunbar High School
- Tates Creek High School

==== Private ====
- Clays Mill Road Christian Academy
- Lexington Catholic High School
- Lexington Christian Academy
- Lexington Latin School
- Mars Hill Academy
- Sayre School
- Trinity Christian Academy

== Fleming County ==
- Fleming County High School, Flemingsburg

== Floyd County ==
- Betsy Layne High School, Betsy Layne (Floyd County Schools)
- The David School, David (Private)
- Floyd Central High School, Eastern (Floyd County Schools)
- The Piarist School, Martin (Private)
- Prestonsburg High School, Prestonsburg (Floyd County Schools)

== Franklin County ==
=== Frankfort ===
- Frankfort High School (Frankfort Independent Schools)
- Frankfort Christian Academy
- Franklin County High School (Franklin County Public Schools)
- Western Hills High School (Franklin County Public Schools)
- William Cofield High School (Franklin County Public Schools)

== Fulton County ==
- Fulton County High School, Hickman (Fulton County Schools)
- Fulton High School, Fulton (Fulton Independent Schools)

== Gallatin County ==
- Gallatin County High School, Warsaw

== Garrard County ==
- Garrard County High School, Lancaster

== Grant County ==
- Grant County High School, Dry Ridge (Grant County Schools)
- Williamstown High School, Williamstown (Williamstown Independent Schools)

== Graves County ==
=== Mayfield ===
- Graves County High School (Graves County Schools)
- Mayfield High School (Mayfield Independent Schools)

== Grayson County ==
=== Leitchfield ===
- Bethel Christian Academy (Private)
- Grayson County High School (Grayson County Schools)

== Green County ==
- Green County High School, Greensburg

== Greenup County ==
- Greenup County High School, Lloyd (Greenup County Schools)
- Raceland-Worthington High School, Raceland (Raceland-Worthington Independent Schools)
- Russell High School, Flatwoods (Russell Independent Schools)

== Hancock County ==
- Hancock County High School, Lewisport

== Hardin County ==
- Fort Knox High School, Fort Knox (DoDEA America)

=== Elizabethtown ===
- Central Hardin High School (Hardin County Schools)
- Elizabethtown Christian Academy (Private)
- Elizabethtown High School (Elizabethtown Independent Schools)

=== Radcliff ===
- John Hardin High School (Hardin County Schools)
- North Hardin Christian Academy (Private)
- North Hardin High School (Hardin County Schools

== Harlan County ==
- Harlan High School, Harlan (Harlan Independent Schools)
- Harlan County High School, Rosspoint (Harlan County Public Schools)

== Harrison County ==
- Harrison County High School, Cynthiana

== Hart County ==
- Caverna High School, Horse Cave (Caverna Independent Schools)
- Hart County High School, Munfordville (Hart County Schools)

== Henderson County ==
- Henderson County High School, Henderson

== Henry County ==
- Eminence High School, Eminence (Eminence Independent Schools)
- Henry County High School, New Castle (Henry County Schools)

== Hickman County ==
- Hickman County High School, Clinton

== Hopkins County ==
- Dawson Springs Jr/Sr High School, Dawson Springs (Dawson Springs Independent Schools)

=== Madisonville/Hopkins County Schools ===
- Hopkins County Central High School
- Madisonville North Hopkins High School

== Jackson County ==
- Jackson County High School, McKee

== Jefferson County ==
- Eastern High School, Middletown
- Jeffersontown High School, Jeffersontown

=== Louisville ===
==== Jefferson County Public Schools ====
- Atherton High School
- Ballard High School
- Breckinridge Metro High School
- Butler Traditional High School
- Central High School
- Doss High School
- DuPont Manual High School
- Fairdale High School
- Fern Creek Traditional High School
- Iroquois High School
- J. Graham Brown School
- Liberty High School
- Louisville Male High School
- Marion C. Moore High School
- Pleasure Ridge Park High School
- Seneca High School MCA
- The Academy @ Shawnee
- Southern High School
- Valley Traditional High School
- Waggener Traditional High School
- Youth Performing Arts School
- Western High School

==== Private ====
- Assumption High School
- Beth Haven Christian School
- Christian Academy of Louisville
- Christian Educational Consortium
- DeSales High School
- Evangel Christian School
- Highlands Latin School
- Holy Angels Academy
- Holy Cross High School
- Kentucky Country Day School
- Landmark Christian Academy
- Louisville Collegiate School
- Mercy Academy
- MICAH Christian School
- Nur Islamic School of Louisville
- Portland Christian School
- Presentation Academy
- Sacred Heart Academy
- Sayers Classical Academy
- St. Francis High School
- St. Xavier High School
- Trinity High School, Louisville
- Valiant Christian Academy
- Walden School
- Whitefield Academy

==== State-operated ====
- Kentucky School for the Blind

== Jessamine County ==
=== Nicholasville ===
- East Jessamine High School
- West Jessamine High School

== Johnson County ==
=== Paintsville ===
- Johnson Central High School (Johnson County School District)
- Paintsville High School (Paintsville Independent School District)

== Kenton County ==
- Beechwood High School, Fort Mitchell (Beechwood Independent School District)
- Dixie Heights High School, Edgewood (Kenton County School District)
- Lloyd Memorial High School, Erlanger (Erlanger-Elsmere Schools)
- Ludlow High School, Ludlow (Ludlow Independent Schools)
- Scott High School, Taylor Mill (Kenton County School District)
- Villa Madonna Academy, Villa Hills (Private)

=== Covington ===
- Calvary Christian School (Private)
- Covington Latin School (Private)
- Holmes Junior/Senior High School (Covington Independent Public Schools)
- Holy Cross High School (Private)

=== Independence ===
- Community Christian Academy (Private)
- Simon Kenton High School (Kenton County School District)

=== Park Hills ===
- Covington Catholic High School (Private)
- Notre Dame Academy (Private)

== Knott County ==
- Cordia School, Hazard (Knott County Schools)
- Knott County Central High School, Hindman (Knott County Schools)
- June Buchanan School, Pippa Passes (Private)

== Knox County ==
- Lynn Camp Middle/High School, Corbin

=== Barbourville ===
- Barbourville High School (Barbourville Independent School District)
- Knox Central High School (Knox County Public Schools)

== LaRue County ==
- LaRue County High School, Hodgenville

== Laurel County ==
=== London ===
- North Laurel High School
- South Laurel High School

== Lawrence County ==
- Lawrence County High School, Louisa

== Lee County ==
- Lee County High School, Beattyville

== Leslie County ==
- Leslie County High School, Hyden

== Letcher County ==
- Jenkins Middle/High School, Jenkins (Jenkins Independent Schools)
- Letcher County Central High School, Ermine (Letcher County Schools)

== Lewis County ==
- Lewis County High School, Vanceburg

== Lincoln County ==
- Lincoln County High School, Stanford

== Livingston County ==
- Livingston Central High School, Smithland

== Logan County ==
=== Russellville ===
- Logan County High School (Logan County Schools)
- Russellville High School (Russellville Independent Schools)

== Lyon County ==
- Lyon County High School, Eddyville

== Madison County ==
=== Berea ===
- Berea Independent Schools:
- Berea Community High School (Berea Independent Schools)
- Madison Southern High School (Madison County Schools)

=== Richmond ===
- Madison Central High School (Madison County Schools)
- Model Laboratory School (Operated by Eastern Kentucky University)

== Magoffin County ==
- Magoffin County High School, Salyersville

== Marion County ==
- Marion County High School (Kentucky), Lebanon

== Marshall County ==
- Christian Fellowship School, Benton (Private)
- Marshall County High School, Draffenville (Marshall County Schools)

== Martin County ==
- Martin County High School, Inez

== Mason County ==
=== Maysville ===
- Mason County High School (Mason County Schools)
- St. Patrick's High School (Private)

== McCracken County ==
=== Paducah ===
- Community Christian Academy (Private)
- McCracken County High School (McCracken County Public Schools)
- Paducah Tilghman High School (Paducah Public Schools)
- St. Mary High School (Private)

== McCreary County ==
- McCreary Central High School, Stearns

== McLean County ==
- McLean County High School, Calhoun

== Meade County ==
- Meade County High School, Brandenburg

== Menifee County ==
- Menifee County High School, Frenchburg

== Mercer County ==
- Mercer County Senior High School, Harrodsburg

== Metcalfe County ==
- Metcalfe County High School, Edmonton

== Monroe County ==
- Monroe County High School, Tompkinsville

== Montgomery County ==
- Montgomery County High School, Mount Sterling

== Morgan County ==
- Morgan County High School, West Liberty

== Muhlenberg County ==
- Muhlenberg County High School, Greenville

== Nelson County ==
=== Bardstown ===
- Bardstown High School (Bardstown City Schools)
- Bethlehem High School (Private)
- Bluegrass Christian Academy (Private)
- Horizons Academy (Nelson County Schools)
- Nelson County Baptist School (Private)
- Nelson County High School (Nelson County Schools)
- Thomas Nelson High School (Nelson County Schools)

== Nicholas County ==
- Nicholas County High School, Carlisle

== Ohio County ==
- Ohio County High School, Hartford

== Oldham County ==
- North Oldham High School, Goshen
- South Oldham High School, Crestwood

=== Buckner ===
- Buckner Alternative High School
- Oldham County High School

== Owen County ==
- Owen County High School, Owenton

== Owsley County ==
- Owsley County High School, Booneville

== Pendleton County ==
- Pendleton County High School, Falmouth

== Perry County ==
- Buckhorn High School, Buckhorn (Perry County Schools)

=== Hazard ===
- Hazard High School (Hazard Independent Schools)
- Perry County Central High School (Perry County Schools)

== Pike County ==
- Belfry High School, Belfry (Pike County Schools)
- East Ridge High School, Lick Creek (Pike County Schools)
- Phelps High School, Phelps (Pike County Schools)

=== Pikeville ===
- Pike County Central High School (Pike County Schools)
- Pikeville High School (Pikeville Independent Schools)
- Shelby Valley High School (Pike County Schools)

== Powell County ==
- Powell County High School, Stanton

== Pulaski County ==
=== Somerset ===
- Pulaski County High School (Pulaski County Schools)
- Somerset Christian School (Private)
- Somerset High School (Somerset Independent Schools)
- Southwestern High School (Pulaski County Schools)

== Robertson County ==
- Robertson County High School, Mount Olivet

== Rockcastle County ==
- Rockcastle County High School, Mount Vernon

== Rowan County ==
- Lakeside Christian Academy, Clearfield

=== Morehead ===
- Farmers Christian Academy (Private)
- Rowan County Senior High School (Rowan County Schools)

== Russell County ==
- Russell County High School, Russell Springs

== Scott County ==
- Great Crossing High School, Georgetown
- Scott County High School, Georgetown

== Shelby County ==
=== Shelbyville ===
- Cornerstone Christian Academy
- Martha Layne Collins High School (Shelby County Public Schools)
- Shelby County High School (Shelby County Public Schools)

== Simpson County ==
- Franklin-Simpson High School, Franklin

== Spencer County ==
=== Taylorsville/Spencer County Public Schools ===
- Hillview Academy
- Spencer County High School

== Taylor County ==
=== Campbellsville ===
- Campbellsville High School (Campbellsville Independent Schools)
- Taylor County High School (Taylor County Schools)

== Todd County ==
- Todd County Central High School, Elkton

== Trigg County ==
- Trigg County High School, Cadiz

== Trimble County ==
- Trimble County High School, Bedford

== Union County ==
- Union County High School, Morganfield

== Warren County ==
=== Bowling Green ===
- Bowling Green High School (Bowling Green Independent Schools)
- Greenwood High School (Warren County Public Schools)
- Legacy Christian Academy of Bowling Green (Private)
- Lighthouse Academy (Warren County Public Schools)
- South Warren High School (Warren County Public Schools)
- Warren Central High School (Warren County Public Schools)
- Warren East High School (Warren County Public Schools)

== Washington County ==
- Washington County High School, Springfield

== Wayne County ==
- Wayne County High School, Monticello

== Webster County ==
- Webster County High School, Dixon

== Whitley County ==
- Corbin High School, Corbin (Corbin Independent School District)

=== Williamsburg ===
- Whitley County High School (Whitley County Schools)
- Williamsburg High School (Williamsburg Independent Schools)

== Wolfe County ==
- Wolfe County High School, Campton

== Woodford County ==
- Woodford County High School, Versailles

== Notes ==
In addition to the above schools, one school located in Tennessee is a member of the Kentucky High School Athletic Association, the state's governing body for high school sports. Fort Campbell High School is located in the Tennessee portion of the Fort Campbell Army base, but has always competed against Kentucky schools. Most of the base housing is in Kentucky, and the high school was once located on the Kentucky side of the base. Like Fort Knox High School, it is administered by the Kentucky District of DoDEA America (the portion of the Department of Defense Education Activity that operates schools within the U.S.).

== See also ==
- List of middle schools in Kentucky
- List of school districts in Kentucky
