= List of schools in Louisville, Kentucky =

Because of the size and diversity of the population of Louisville, Kentucky, there are many schools in a number of different school systems, both public and private. This list of schools in Louisville, Kentucky, attempts to list the educational institutions in Louisville, as well as some post-secondary institutions in the surrounding metropolitan area.

== Private schools ==
=== Combined elementary and high schools ===
- The Academy for Individual Excellence (Nonsectarian) (PK–12)
- Beth Haven Christian School (Baptist) (PK–12)
- Christian Academy of Louisville (Christian) (K–12)
- Covenant Classical Academy (Christian, Classical) (K–12)
- Evangel Christian School (K–12)
- Families For Christ Christian Academy (Christian) (1–12)
- Francis Parker School of Louisville (Progressive Education) (Nonsectarian)(PK-12)
- Highlands Latin School (Christian, Classical) (K–12)
- Immaculata Classical Academy (Catholic, Classical and Inclusive of Children with special needs) (PS3–12)
- Kentucky Country Day School (Nonsectarian) (K–12)
- Landmark Christian Academy (Baptist) (K–12)
- Louisville Adventist Academy (Seventh-day Adventist) (K–12)
- Louisville Classical Academy (Independent, Nonsectarian) (K–12)
- Louisville Collegiate School (Nonsectarian) (PK–12)
- M I C A H School (Baptist) (PK–11)
- Northside Christian School (Baptist) (K–12)
- Nur Islamic School of Louisville (Islamic) (PK–12)
- Pitt Academy (Catholic) (K–12)
- Portland Christian School (Christian) (K–12)
- Sayers Classical Academy (Christian, Classical) (PK–12)
- Valor Traditional Academy (Christian) (K–12)
- Walden School (Nonsectarian) (K–12)
- Whitefield Academy (Baptist) (formerly Highview Baptist School) (PK–12)

=== Elementary schools ===
- Ascension Elementary School (Catholic)
- The Chance School (Nonsectarian)
- Community Catholic Elementary School (Catholic)
- The De Paul School (Nonsectarian)
- Eastside Christian Academy (Christian)
- Friends School (Nonsectarian)
- Hayfield Montessori School (Nonsectarian)
- Holy Family Elementary School (Catholic)
- Holy Spirit Elementary School (Catholic)
- Holy Trinity Parish School (Catholic)
- Immaculata Classical Academy (Catholic)
- Louisville Classical Academy (Independent, Nonsectarian)
- Louisville Deaf Oral School (Nonsectarian)
- Meredith-Dunn School (Nonsectarian)
- Emma Minnis SDA School (Seventh-day Adventist)
- Montessori School of Louisville
- Mother of Good Counsel Elementary School (Catholic)
- Notre Dame Academy (Catholic)
- Our Lady of Lourdes Elementary School (Catholic)
- Our Savior Lutheran School (Lutheran)
- Pope John Paul II Academy (Catholic)
- Prospect Latin School (Christian, Private)
- Sacred Heart Model School (Catholic)
- St. Agnes Elementary School (Catholic)
- St. Albert the Great Elementary School (Catholic)
- St. Andrew Academy (Catholic)
- St. Athanasius Elementary School (Catholic)
- St. Bernard Elementary School (Catholic)
- St. Denis Elementary School (Catholic)
- St. Edward Elementary School (Catholic)
- St. Francis of Assisi Elementary School (Catholic)
- St. Francis Goshen Campus Preschool to 8th (Nonsectarian)
- St. Gabriel Elementary School (Catholic)
- St. Helen Elementary School (Catholic)
- St. James Elementary School (Catholic)
- St. Lawrence Elementary School (Catholic)
- St. Leonard Elementary School (Catholic)
- St. Margaret Mary Elementary School (Catholic)
- St. Martha Elementary School (Catholic)
- St. Michael Elementary School (Catholic)
- St. Nicholas Academy (Catholic)
- St. Patrick Elementary School (Catholic)
- St. Paul Elementary School (Catholic)
- St. Raphael Elementary School (Catholic)
- St. Rita Elementary School (Catholic)
- St. Rose Elementary School (Catholic)
- St. Stephen Martyr Elementary School (Catholic)
- Summit Academy Of Greater Louisville (Nonsectarian)
- Thomas Merton Academy (Catholic)
- Waldorf School Of Louisville (Nonsectarian)
- The West End School

=== High schools ===
- Assumption High School (Catholic, female only)
- DeSales High School (Catholic, male only)
- Holy Cross High School (Catholic, co-ed)
- Louisville Classical Academy (Independent, Nonsectarian)
- Mercy Academy (Catholic, female only)
- Presentation Academy (Catholic, female only)
- Sacred Heart Academy (Catholic, female only)
- St. Francis High School (Nonsectarian)
- St. Xavier High School (Catholic, male only)
- Trinity High School (Catholic, male only)

== Colleges and universities ==
=== Public institutions ranked by highest degree offered ===
- University of Louisville (Highest degree offered is Doctorate)
- Indiana University Southeast (Located in nearby New Albany, Indiana, highest degree offered is Master's Degree)
- Purdue University New Albany (Located in nearby New Albany, Indiana, highest degree offered is a Bachelor's Degree)
- Jefferson Community and Technical College (Highest degree offered is Associate's)
- Ivy Tech Community College of Indiana (Located in nearby Sellersburg, Indiana, highest degree offered is Associate's)

=== Private institutions offering four year (or more) degrees ===
- Bellarmine University (Not-for-profit, Catholic)
- Boyce College (Not-for-profit, Baptist)
- Campbellsville University - Louisville (Not-for-profit, Baptist)
- Indiana Wesleyan University (Not-for-profit, Wesleyan, Louisville Campus)
- ITT Technical Institute (For-profit)
- Louisville Bible College (Not-for-profit, Christian Churches/Churches of Christ)
- Louisville Presbyterian Theological Seminary (Not-for-profit, Presbyterian)
- McKendree University (Not-for-profit, Louisville Campus)
- Simmons College of Kentucky (Not-for-profit, HBCU)
- Southern Baptist Theological Seminary (Not-for-profit, Baptist)
- Spalding University (Not-for-profit, Catholic)
- Sullivan University (For-profit)
- Sullivan College of Technology and Design (For-profit)
- University of Phoenix (For-profit, Louisville Campus)
- Webster University (Not-for-profit, Louisville Campus)

=== Private institutions offering two year degrees ===
- Boyce College (Not-for-profit, Baptist)
- Brown Mackie College (For-profit, primary school in Kansas)
- Daymar College (For-profit)
- Galen College of Nursing (For-profit)
- National College of Business and Technology (For-profit)
- Spencerian College (For-profit)
- Empire Beauty School (For-profit)
- Louisville Beauty Academy (For-profit)
- Louisville Institute of Technology (LIT) (For-profit)
