= List of schools of the Roman Catholic Archdiocese of Louisville =

== K-12 schools ==
As of 2026 there are four Catholic K-12 schools in the archdiocese.

- Corpus Christi Classical Academy (private)
- Holy Angels Academy (private)
- Immaculata Classical Academy (private)
- Pitt Academy (private)

== High schools ==
As of 2026 there are nine Catholic high schools in the archdiocese.

- Assumption High School
- Bethlehem High School
- DeSales High School
- Holy Cross High School
- Mercy Academy
- Presentation Academy
- Sacred Heart Academy
- Saint Xavier High School
- Trinity High School

== Elementary schools ==
There are or have been over thirty Catholic elementary schools within the Archdiocese of Louisville. A significant number also have a pre-school.

=== Ascension Elementary School ===
Ascension Elementary School serves grades PreK-8 within the Archdiocese of Louisville. Sports teams compete under the title "The Ascension Longhorns". The school won the 2019 Department of Education Blue Ribbon Award.

The school is in the St. Regis Park neighborhood of Louisville, Kentucky currently serves about 370 students with 35 teachers plus supporting staff. It teaches the core curriculum, in addition to art, music, computer, Physical Education and Spanish classes.

=== Community Catholic Elementary School ===
Closed in 2002 in the Archdiocesan 2000 Plan

=== Holy Family School ===
Opened in 1927 on Poplar Level Road. Holy Family School closed May 30, 2014 due to declining enrolment and increasing parish costs.

=== Holy Spirit Parish School ===
Holy Spirit Parish School was founded in 1937. In 2007 and again in 2014, Holy Spirit was honored as a Blue Ribbon School.

=== Holy Trinity Parish School ===
Holy Trinity Parish School is a two time nationally recognized Blue Ribbon School of Excellence by the U.S. Department of Education. As a Catholic school, it serves boys and girls of all faiths, races, and national backgrounds from pre-kindergarten through the eighth grade. Founded in 1883, Holy Trinity Parish School remains associated with Holy Trinity Parish and a school within the Archdiocese of Louisville.

=== John Paul II Academy ===
This school was created in 2006 by the merger of St. Barnabas Elementary School, St. Bartholomew Elementary School, and St. Pius X Elementary School. The school is one of the smallest in the Archdiocese of Louisville, with only around 300 students. In 2015, St. Barnabas and St. Plus X merged to become St. John Paul II Parish, while St. Bartholomew still exists as a separate parish.

=== Our Lady of Lourdes School ===
A K–8 school located in St. Matthews, recognized as a Blue Ribbon School of Excellence in 2008.

=== Thomas Merton Academy ===
The school was named after Trappist monk and author Thomas Merton. The kindergarten through eighth grade school closed in 2003.

=== Saint Agnes School ===
Located at Saint Agnes Catholic Community on Newburg Road; named a Blue Ribbon School of Excellence in 1999, 2005, 2014, and 2020.

=== St. Albert the Great Elementary School ===
Located at St. Albert the Great Parish on Girard Drive, in eastern Jefferson County. St. Albert won its first championship in the '60s. This school is also top ranked in all CA schools, and they go from preschool all the way to the 8th grade.

=== St. Andrew Academy ===
School created in 2005 by the merger of Our Lady of Consolation Elementary School, St. Clement Elementary School, and St. Polycarp Elementary School.

=== St. Athanasius Parish School ===
Located at St. Athanasius Parish on the Outer Loop in southeast Jefferson County.

=== Saint Bernard Catholic School ===
Located at Saint Bernard Parish in the Highview area of southeast Jefferson County.

=== St. Denis Elementary School ===
Closed at the end of the 2003–2004 school year.

=== Saint Edward Parish School ===
Located at Saint Edward Catholic Community in Jeffersontown.

=== St. Francis of Assisi Catholic School ===
Located in The Highlands, more specifically the Deer Park neighborhood. The school has been named a Blue Ribbon School of Excellence twice; once in 2016, and later in 2022.

=== St. Gabriel Elementary School ===
Located at St. Gabriel the Archangel Parish on Bardstown Rd in Louisville, KY. This school offer Pre-K through 8th grade education.

=== St. Helen Elementary School ===
Closed at the end of the 2003–2004 school year, with both buildings (original and 1950s addition) torn down December 2014 – January 2015.

=== St. James Catholic Elementary School ===
Located on the grounds of St. James Church in The Highlands, more specifically the Tyler Park neighborhood.

=== St. Lawrence Elementary School ===
This school merged with St. Helen and St. Denis Elementary Schools in 2004 to form Notre Dame Academy. The school remains on the St. Lawrence Parish grounds.

=== Saint Leonard Parish School ===
Opened in 1957 at the St. Leonard Catholic Community on Zorn Avenue. School closed 2020.

=== St. Margaret Mary School ===
Located at the St. Margaret Mary Catholic Community on Shelbyville Road (US 60) directly across from Oxmoor Center; Blue Ribbon School of Excellence in 2004 and in 2015.

=== St. Martha Catholic School ===
This school educates students from Pre-K through 8th grade. Michael Bickett has served as principal since August 2016, along with assistant principal Taffie Duckworth. The school's mascot is the shamrock. Founded in 1960 the average student to teacher ratio is 18:1.

=== Saint Michael School ===
Located at Saint Michael Church in Jeffersontown; Blue Ribbon School of Excellence in 2009.

=== St. Nicholas Academy ===
Created in 2005 by the merger of Most Blessed Sacrament Elementary School, Our Lady of Mount Carmel Elementary School, S.S. Simon & Jude Elementary School, and St. Thomas More Elementary School.

=== St. Raphael School ===
St. Raphael's has programs from 2 years to the eighth grade. The school has won the Blue Ribbon twice.

=== St. Rita Catholic School ===
Opened in 1928 at Saint Rita Catholic Church on Preston Highway in the Okolona area.
