= Saint Francis School =

Saint Francis School may refer to:

In India

- Saint Francis School Deoghar

In the United States

- St. Francis Schools (Alpharetta, Georgia)
- St. Francis School (Goshen, Kentucky)
- Saint Francis School (Hawaii)
- Old St. Francis School, Bend, Oregon
- St. Francis School (Austin, Texas)
- St. Francis Indian School in St. Francis, South Dakota
- Francis Parker School of Louisville, Kentucky, originally known as St. Francis School

== See also ==
- Saint Francis High School (disambiguation)
