= Jeffery Donohue =

American politician (born 1954)

Member of the Kentucky House of Representatives from the 37th district
- In office January 1, 2013 – January 1, 2023
- Preceded by: Wade Hurt
- Succeeded by: Emily Callaway

Personal details
- Born: June 26, 1954 (age 72)
- Party: Democratic
- Website: electdonohue.com

Jeffery Martin Donohue (born June 26, 1954) is an American politician and a former Democratic member of the Kentucky House of Representatives representing District 37 from 2013 to 2023. He was defeated for reelection in 2022 by Republican Emily Callaway.

== Education ==
Donohue graduated from Fairdale High School.

== Elections ==
- 2012 Donohue challenged incumbent Representative Wade Hurt, who had switched parties, in the May 22, 2012 Democratic Primary, winning with 1,132 votes (63.4%) and was unopposed for the November 6, 2012 General election, winning with 7,864 votes.
- 2010 When District 37 Representative Ron Weston left the Legislature and left the seat open, Donohue was unopposed for seeking the Democratic nomination, but did not qualify; Republican nominee Wade Hurt was unopposed for the November 2, 2010 General election.
