= Holy Angels Academy =

Holy Angels Academy may refer to:

- Holy Angels Academy (Buffalo, New York)
- Holy Angels Academy (Louisville, Kentucky)
