= Emily Callaway =

American politician (born 1978)

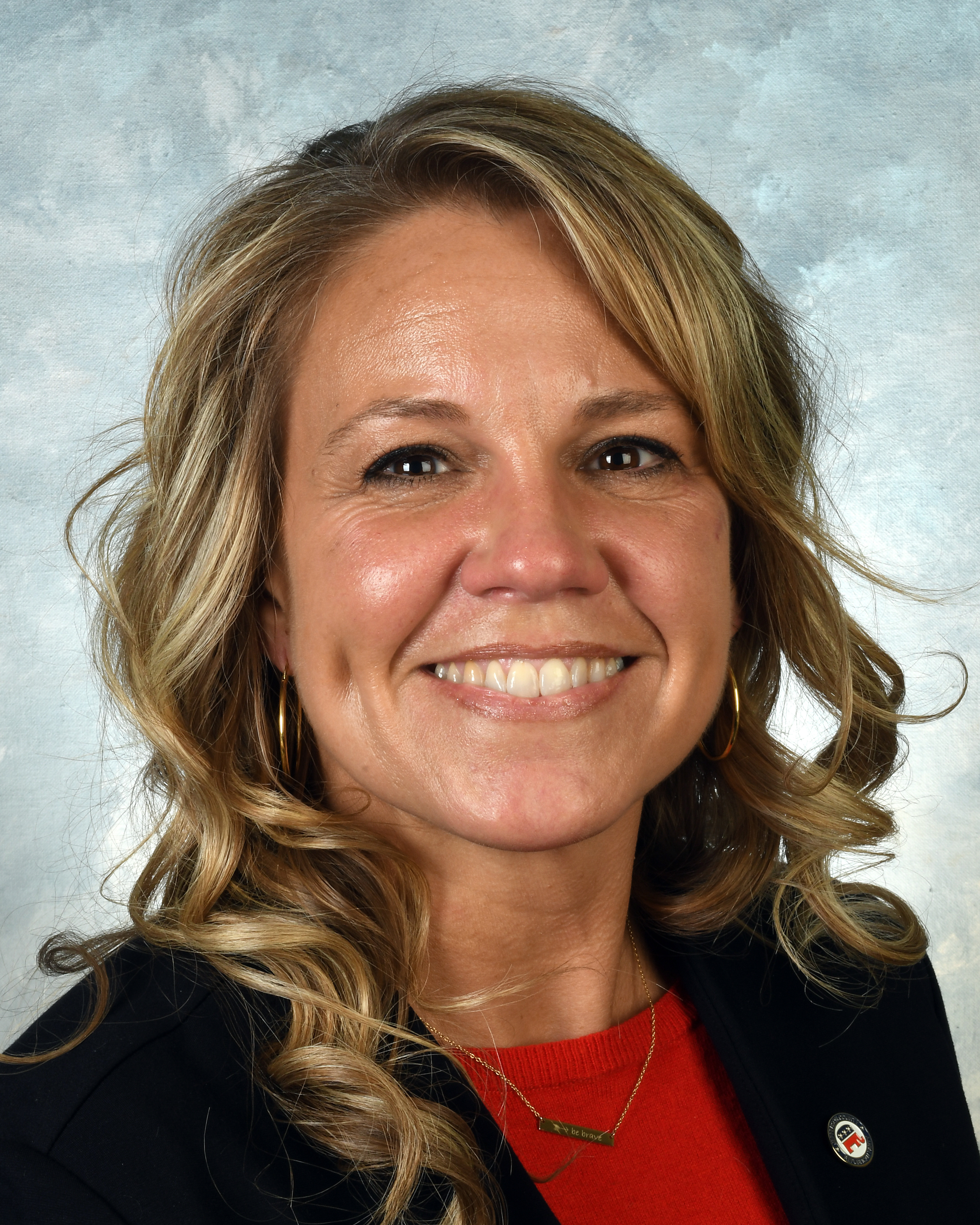

Member of the Kentucky House of Representatives from the 37th district
- Incumbent
- Assumed office January 1, 2023
- Preceded by: Jeffery Donohue

Personal details
- Born: June 6, 1978 (age 48)
- Party: Republican
- Profession: Substitute teacher
- Committees: Education; Health Services; Licensing, Occupations, & Administrative Regulations

Emily Myers Callaway (born June 6, 1978) is an American politician who has served as a Republican member of the Kentucky House of Representatives since January 1, 2023. She represents Kentucky's 37th House district which includes parts of Bullitt and Jefferson County.

== Background ==
Callaway graduated from Pleasure Ridge Park High School before attending the University of Louisville. She works as a substitute teacher at Whitefield Academy.

She identifies as a Baptist.

== Political career ==
=== Elections ===
- 2022 Callaway won the 2022 Republican primary with 1,302 votes (62.8%) against Jimmy Maricle, and won the 2022 Kentucky House of Representatives election with 7,494 votes (57.9%), unseating Democratic incumbent Jeffery Donohue. She assumed office on January 1, 2023.
- 2024 Callaway was unopposed in the 2024 Republican primary and won the 2024 Kentucky House of Representatives election with 10,330 votes (56.4%) against Democratic candidate John Stovall.
- 2026 Callaway was unopposed in both the 2026 primary and the 2026 general election.

Kentucky House of Representatives
Preceded by Jeffery Donohue	Member of the Kentucky House of Representatives; 2023–present	Succeeded by incumbent
