= Chuck Smith (American football coach) =

American football coach (born 1957)

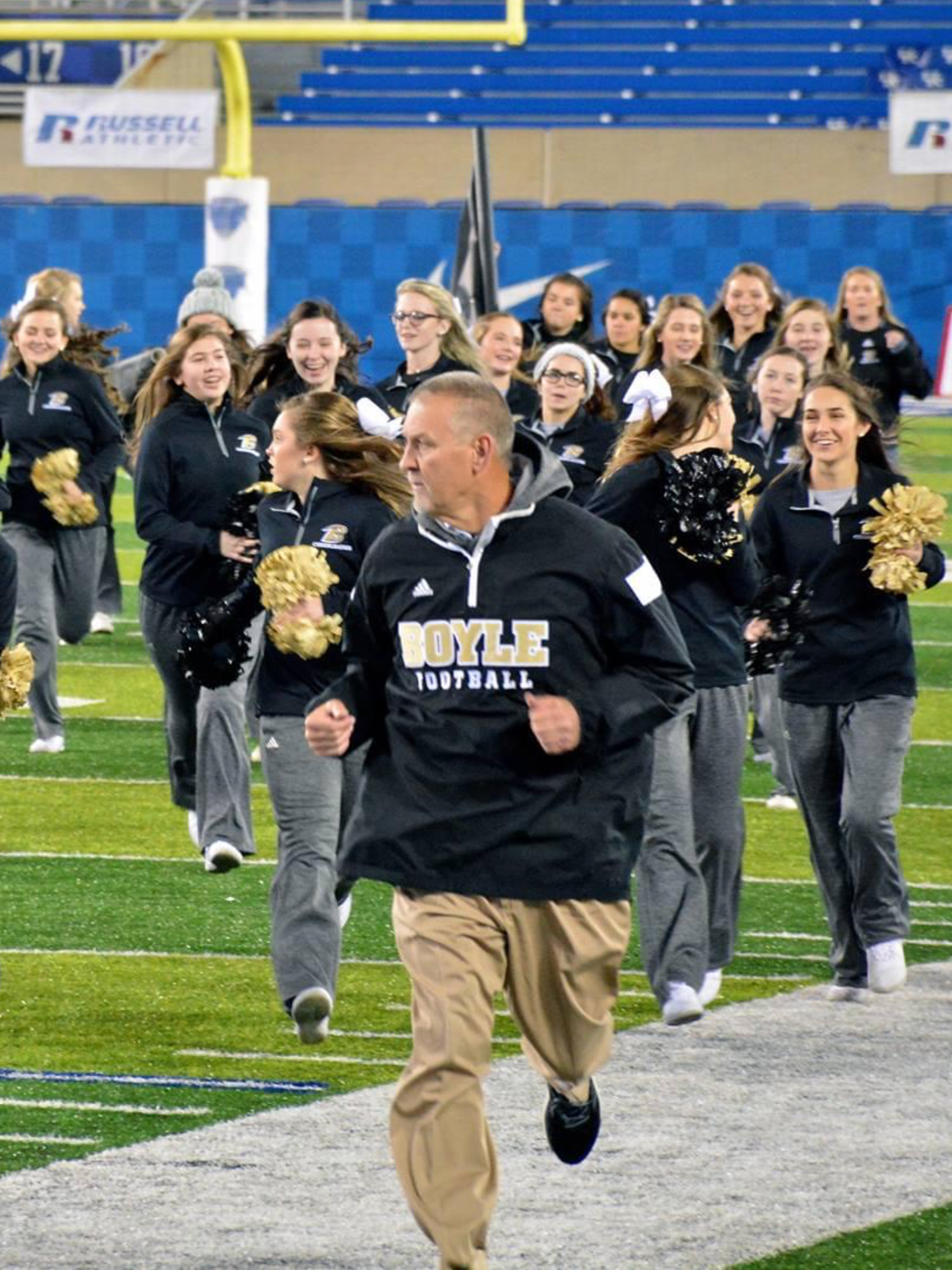
- Smith Coaching at Boyle County

Biographical details
- Born: December 21, 1957 (age 68); Louisville, Kentucky

Playing career
- 1978–1980: Kentucky
- Position: Linebacker

Coaching career (HC unless noted)
- 1983–1986: Mercer County High School (KY) (assistant)
- 1987: Allen County Scottsville HS (KY)
- 1988–1991: Campbellsville HS (KY)
- 1992–2004: Boyle County HS (KY)
- 2005–2012: Kentucky (LB)
- 2013: Bardstown HS (KY) (DC)
- 2014–2019: Boyle County HS (KY)
- 2020- Present: South Warren HS (Defensive Coordinator) (KY)

Head coaching record
- Overall: 234–69
- Bowls: 6–2

Accomplishments and honors

Championships
- 6 KHSAA state (1999, 2000, 2001, 2002, 2003, 2017)

Awards
- 5x Courier-Journal Coach of the Year (1999, 2000, 2001, 2004, 2019); NFHS Coach of the Year (2003); Kentucky Football Coaches Association 4A coach of the year (2019)
- Education: Jeffersontown High School, University of Kentucky
- Occupations: High school and college football coach
- Years active: 1983–2019
- Spouse: Jackie Smith
- Children: 2

Chuck Smith (born December 21, 1957) is an American football coach who is an assistant at South Warren High School under his son Brandon. Smith served as the head coach at Boyle County High School, Campbellsville High School, and Allen County Scottsville High School. Smith also served as linebackers coach at the University of Kentucky. At Boyle County, Smith won six state championships and a KHSAA record breaking five in a row from 1999 to 2003. Smith is highly regarded as one of the best football coaches in Kentucky high school football history.

== Early life and education ==
Smith was born on December 21, 1957 in Louisville, Kentucky. He was an all-state linebacker at Jeffersontown High School, graduating in 1977. He was a linebacker for the University of Kentucky from 1978 to 1980.

== Coaching career ==
=== Early coaching career ===
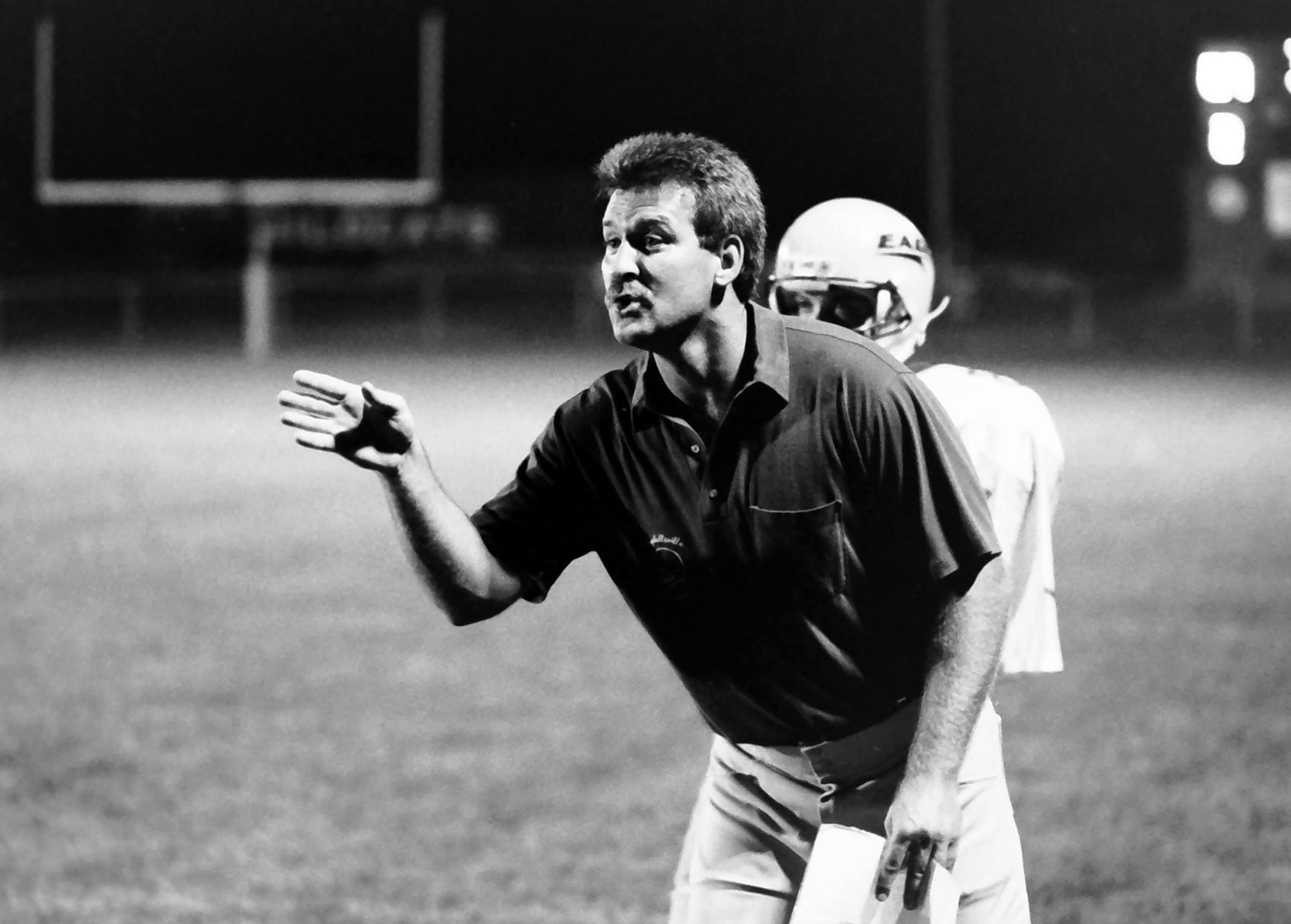
Smith as the head coach at Campbellsville High School

Shortly after Smith's playing career at Kentucky, Smith began his coaching career at Mercer county High School as an assistant under long-time coach Larry French. After three years with the Scotties, Smith accepted the head coaching job at Allen County Scottsville High School, having a 6–5 season. After one year with the Patriots, Smith accepted the head coaching job at Campbellsville High School leading to a turnaround for the Eagles football program.

=== Boyle County ===
After revitalizing Campbellsville's football program, Smith accepted the head coaching job at Boyle County High School. Prior to Smith's arrival at Boyle County, the Rebels had not had a winning season since 1986 when they went 7–4. Additionally, they had not had a ten-win season since 1976. During the 1992 season, Smith's first Rebels team went 7–4 snapping a 6-year losing record streak. Three years later, Smith's Rebels went 10–3, their first ten-win season in 19 years. Four years later Smith has the first undefeated 15–0 season in Boyle County football history and won Boyle's first state championship in school history. From 1999 to 2003, Smith's Rebels won a then state record breaking five state championships in a row, four of them being undefeated 15–0 seasons led by 2001 Kentucky Mr. Football winner Jeff Duggins and future NFL tight end Jacob Tamme.

=== Kentucky ===
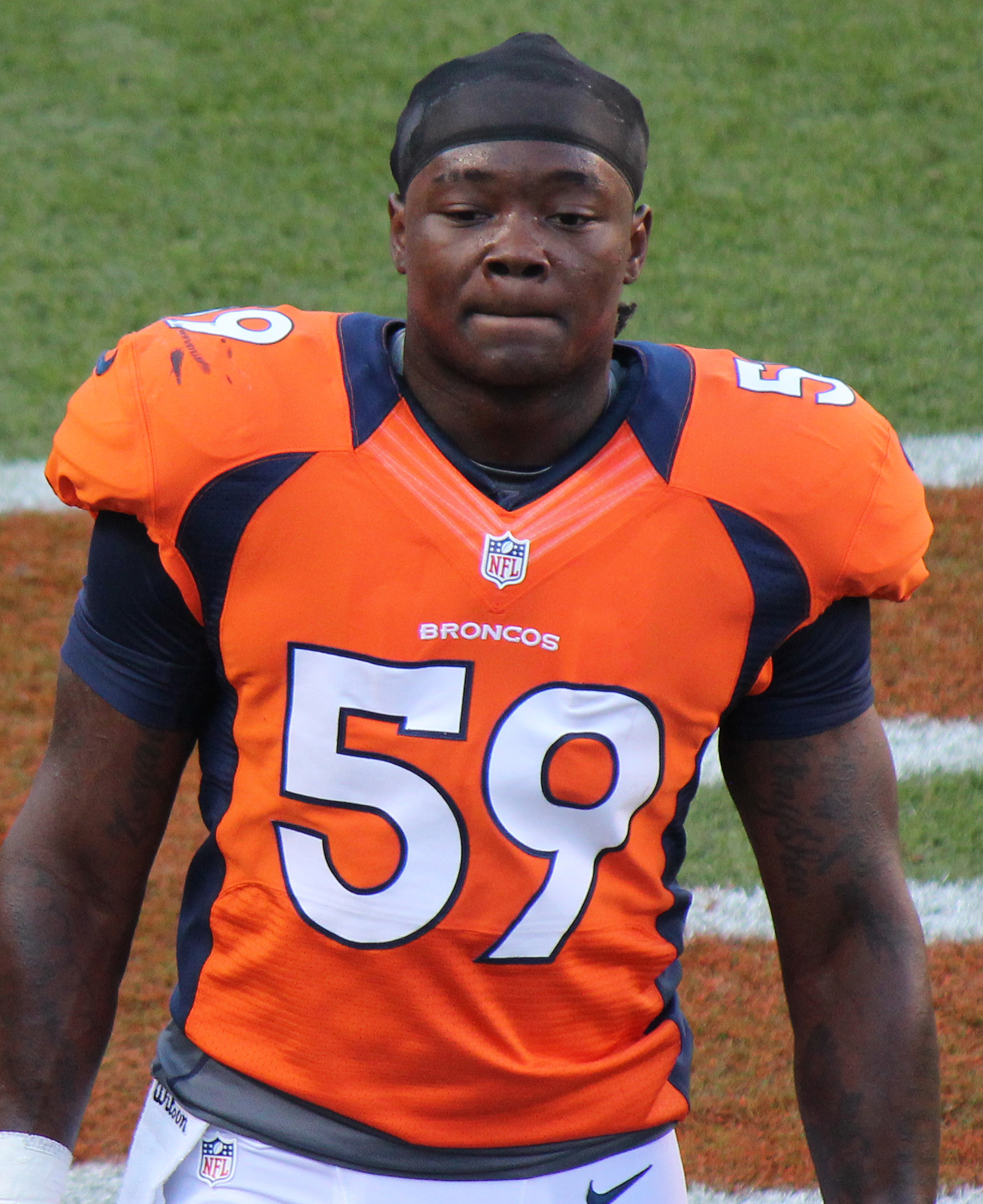
Danny Trevathan, who Smith coached at Kentucky

Following an incredible run at Boyle County, Smith accepted his dream job, coaching linebackers at Kentucky. Under head coaches Rich Brooks and Joker Phillips, Smith coached four first team All-SEC linebackers. Those names include Super Bowl 50 champion Danny Trevathan, Wesley Woodyard, Micah Johnson, and Sam Maxwell.

=== Return to Boyle County ===
After leaving Kentucky, Smith had a one-year stint as defensive coordinator at Bardstown High School. In 2014, Smith accepted the head coaching job at Madison Central High School. However, that was short-lived because less than three weeks later Smith resigned. Following Smith's resignation from Madison Central, Smith returned to head coaching at Boyle County due to the departure of former Boyle head coach Larry French. During Smith's second tenure with the Rebels, he compiled a record of 69–12 with one state championship title.

== Head coaching record ==
Below is a year-by-year breakdown of Smith's coaching record.

Year	Team	Overall	Bowl/playoffs	Litkenhous^{#}	MaxPreps^{°}
Allen County Scottsville (Kentucky High School Athletic Association (KHSAA)) (1987)
1987	Allen County Scottsville	6–5			
Allen County Scottsville:		6-5			
Boyle County Rebels (Kentucky High School Athletic Association (KHSAA)) (1992–2004)
1992	Boyle County	7–4			
1993	Boyle County	2–8			
1994	Boyle County	9–4			
1995	Boyle County	10–3			
1996	Boyle County	11–3			
1997	Boyle County	11–1			
1998	Boyle County	7–5	L 2nd round of KHSAA 2A playoffs to Lexington Catholic 28–13.		
1999	Boyle County	15–0	W KHSAA Commonwealth Gridiron Bowl		
2000	Boyle County	15–0	W KHSAA Commonwealth Gridiron Bowl		
2001	Boyle County	15–0	W KHSAA Commonwealth Gridiron Bowl		
2002	Boyle County	13–2	W KHSAA Commonwealth Gridiron Bowl		
2003	Boyle County	15–0	W KHSAA Commonwealth Gridiron Bowl		
2004	Boyle County	13–2	L KHSAA Commonwealth Gridiron Bowl		3
Boyle County Rebels (Kentucky High School Athletic Association (KHSAA)) (2014–2019)
2014	Boyle County	11–2	L 3rd round of KHSAA 4A playoffs to Lexington Catholic 40–35.		36
2015	Boyle County	10–2	L 2nd round of KHSAA 3A playoffs to Central 27–14.	10	20
2016	Boyle County	7–5	L 2nd round of KHSAA 3A playoffs to Central 37–6.		52
2017	Boyle County	14–1	W 3A KHSAA Commonwealth Gridiron Bowl	2	2
2018	Boyle County	13–1	L 3A State Semifinals 21–0 to Corbin	9	13
2019	Boyle County	14–1	L 4A KHSAA Commonwealth Gridiron Bowl		5
Boyle County:		212–44			
Total:		212–44			
National championship Conference title Conference division title or championship game berth
^{#}The Courier-Journal's Litkenhous Ratings.; ^{°}MaxPreps KYHS Rankings.

== Personal life ==
Smith is married to Jackie Smith.

Smith has two children, Brandon and Nicole. Brandon is the head coach at South Warren High School in Bowling Green, Kentucky, where he has won two KHSAA state championships.

== Notable players coached by Chuck Smith ==
=== Boyle County ===
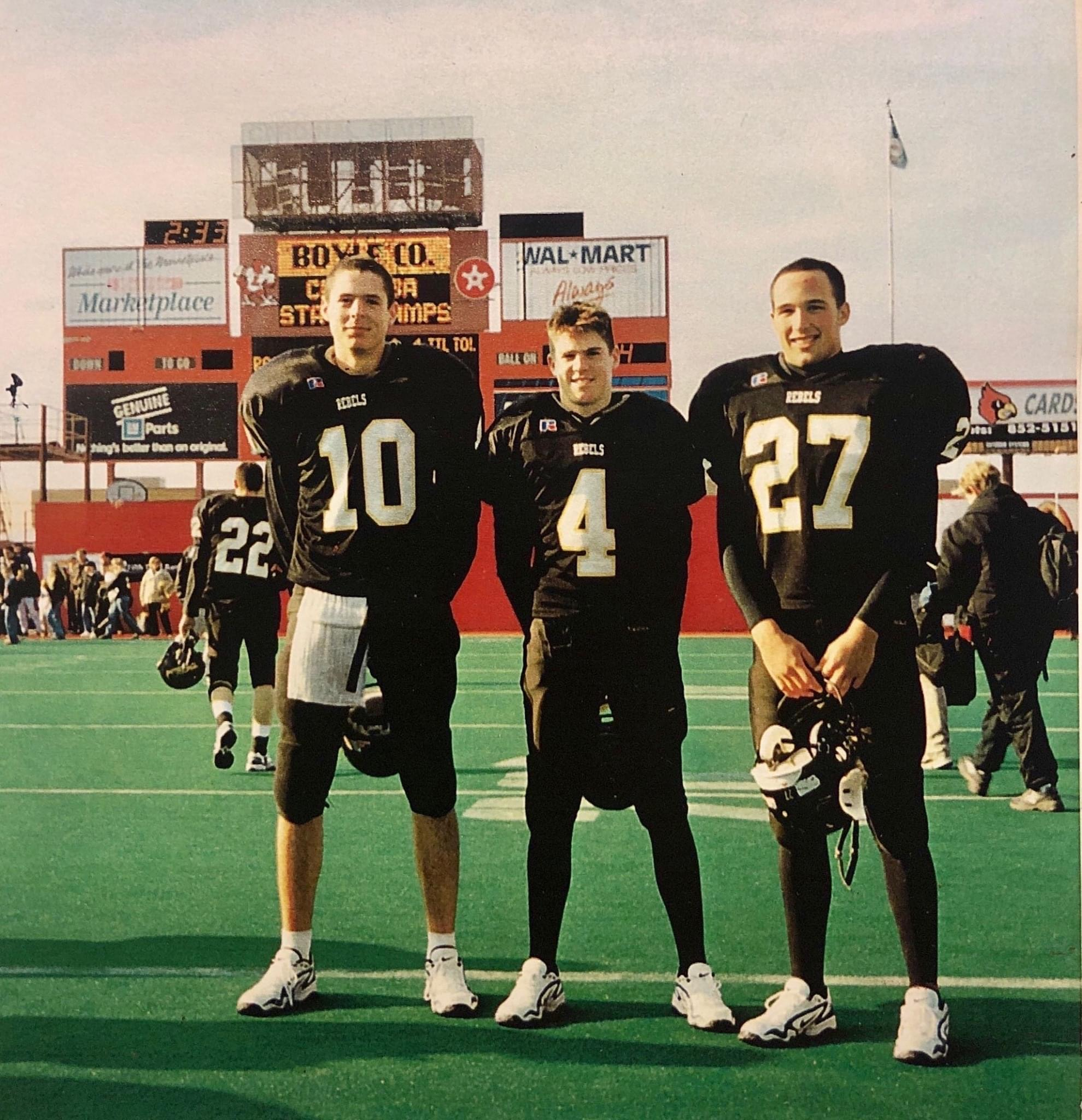
Future NFL tight end Jacob Tamme playing for Boyle County High School.

- Jacob Tamme: 4th-round pick in the 2008 NFL draft by the Indianapolis Colts. Appeared in Super Bowl XLIV with the Colts, then appeared in Super Bowl XLVIII with the Denver Broncos, then was on the Super Bowl LI team with the Atlanta Falcons. Smith coached Tamme at Boyle County High School and at the University of Kentucky.
- Neal Brown: Current head coach at West Virginia. Was also the head coach at Troy 2015–2018 amassing a 35–16 record with 2 Sun Belt Conference championships and 3 bowl wins with the Trojans. Also served as an assistant at UMASS (2003), Sacred Heart (2004), Delaware (2005), Troy (2006–2009), Texas Tech (2010–2012), and Kentucky (2013–2014).
- Travis Leffew: Offensive lineman that played at Louisville. After graduating at Louisville, Leffew went on to become an undrafted NFL offensive lineman playing for the Chicago Bears (2006), Green Bay Packers (2006–2007), Dallas Cowboys (2006), Atlanta Falcons (2007), Kansas City Chiefs (2007–2008), and Cleveland Browns (2008). Leffew was also the head coach at Lincoln County High School (Kentucky) (2014–2017) and now serves as offensive line coach at Boyle County (2018–present).

=== Kentucky ===
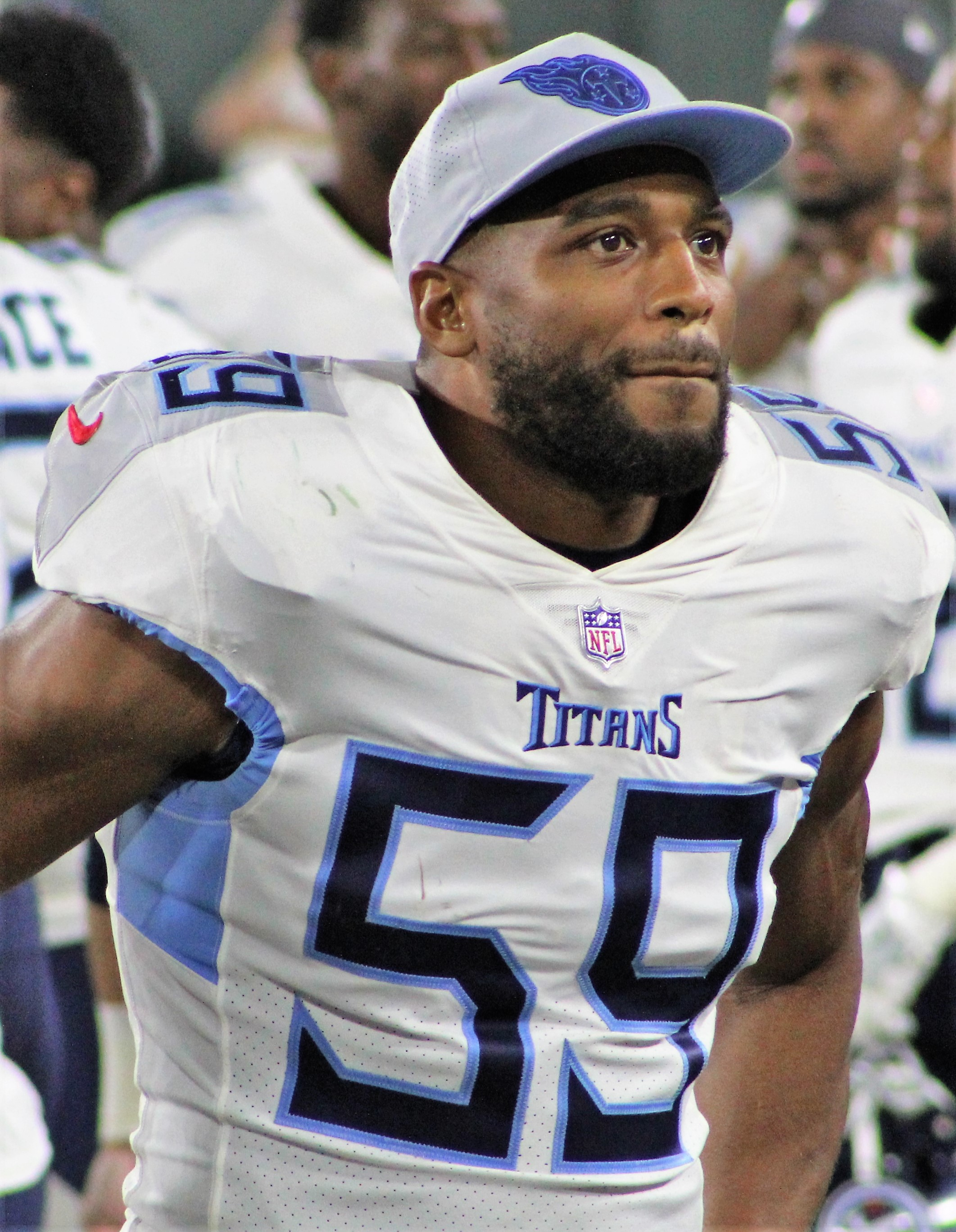
Former Kentucky linebacker Wesley Woodyard.

- Danny Trevathan: Former linebacker for the Chicago Bears. Also, Super Bowl 50 champion, 2010 First-team All-SEC, and 2011 Second-team All-SEC.
- Wesley Woodyard: Played linebacker for the Denver Broncos and the Tennessee Titans. Also was First-team All-SEC two years in a row (2006, 2007).
- Micah Johnson: Played linebacker for the Miami Dolphins. Also, a First-team All-SEC selection in 2008 and received SEC coaches All-freshmen honors in 2006. Smith Coached Johnson at Kentucky.
- Avery Williamson: Former NFL linebacker.
