= Latin School =

Latin School may refer to:

- Latin schools of Medieval and post-medieval or early modern Europe; also called grammar school, or Gymnasium
- Royal Latin School, Buckingham, England
- Latin schools in colonial North America and the USA; and of these several specific schools in the United States, some of which were founded to teach Latin and some of which were not, or no longer do:
  - Boston Latin School, Boston, MA
  - Boys' Latin School of Maryland, Baltimore, MD
  - Brooklyn Latin School, New York, NY
  - Cambridge Rindge and Latin School in Cambridge, Massachusetts
  - Charlotte Latin School, Charlotte, NC
  - Covington Latin School, Covington, KY
  - Highlands Latin School, Louisville, KY
  - the 6th to 8th grade program at Kellenberg Memorial High School, Long Island, NY
  - Latin School of Chicago, Chicago, IL
  - Roxbury Latin School, Roxbury, MA
  - Washington Latin Public Charter School, Washington, DC
