= St. Paul Elementary School =

St. Paul Elementary School can refer to:

- St. Paul Elementary School (Kentucky) in the Archdiocese of Louisville, Kentucky
- St. Paul Elementary School (Quebec) in Beaconsfield, Quebec
- St. Paul Elementary School (Toronto) in Toronto, Ontario
- St. Paul Elementary School (Virginia) in St. Paul, Virginia
