= Paul Clark (Kentucky politician) =

American politician

Member of the Kentucky House of Representatives from the 37th district
- In office January 1, 1980 – January 1, 1995
- Preceded by: Jerry Kleier
- Succeeded by: Perry B. Clark

Personal details
- Born: July 11, 1932
- Died: December 11, 2016 (aged 84)
- Party: Democratic

Paul Martin Clark (July 11, 1932 – December 11, 2016) was an American politician from Kentucky who was a member of the Kentucky House of Representatives from 1980 to 1995. Clark was first elected in 1979 after incumbent representative Jerry Kleier retired. He did not seek reelection in 1994 and was succeeded by his son Perry B. Clark.

He died in December 2016 at age 84.
