= Kentucky's 37th House of Representatives district =

American legislative district

Kentucky's 37th State House of Representatives district
Representative
Emily Callaway; R–Louisville
since January 1, 2023
- Registration: 46.4% Democratic; 40.8% Republican; 12.2% No party preference
- Demographics: 63.1% White; 11.4% Black; 17.7% Hispanic; 1.8% Asian; 0.1% Hawaiian/Pacific Islander; 5.9% Multiracial
- Population (2024): 47,360
- Registered voters (2026): 30,911

Kentucky's 37th House of Representatives district is one of 100 districts in the Kentucky House of Representatives. It comprises part of Bullitt and Jefferson Counties. It has been represented by Emily Callaway (R–Louisville) since 2023. As of 2024, the district had a population of 47,360.

== Voter registration ==
On January 1, 2026, the district had 30,911 registered voters, who were registered with the following parties.

Party	Registration	
Party	Voters	%
Democratic	14,342	46.40
Republican	12,599	40.76
Independent	1,626	5.26
Libertarian	133	0.43
Green	31	0.10
Constitution	15	0.05
Socialist Workers	10	0.03
Reform	3	0.01
"Other"	2,152	6.96
Total	30,911	100.00

== List of members representing the district ==
Member	Party	Years	Electoral history	District location
Paul Clark (Louisville)	Democratic	January 1, 1980 – January 1, 1995	Elected in 1979. Reelected in 1981. Reelected in 1984. Reelected in 1986. Reelected in 1988. Reelected in 1990. Reelected in 1992. Retired.	1974–1985; Jefferson County (part).
Paul Clark (Louisville)	Democratic	January 1, 1980 – January 1, 1995	Elected in 1979. Reelected in 1981. Reelected in 1984. Reelected in 1986. Reelected in 1988. Reelected in 1990. Reelected in 1992. Retired.	1985–1993; Jefferson County (part).
Paul Clark (Louisville)	Democratic	January 1, 1980 – January 1, 1995	Elected in 1979. Reelected in 1981. Reelected in 1984. Reelected in 1986. Reelected in 1988. Reelected in 1990. Reelected in 1992. Retired.	1993–1997; Jefferson County (part).
Perry B. Clark (Louisville)	Democratic	January 1, 1995 – January 9, 2006	Elected in 1994. Reelected in 1996. Reelected in 1998. Reelected in 2000. Reelected in 2002. Reelected in 2004. Resigned to run for the Kentucky Senate.	1993–1997; Jefferson County (part).
Perry B. Clark (Louisville)	Democratic	January 1, 1995 – January 9, 2006	Elected in 1994. Reelected in 1996. Reelected in 1998. Reelected in 2000. Reelected in 2002. Reelected in 2004. Resigned to run for the Kentucky Senate.	1997–2003
Perry B. Clark (Louisville)	Democratic	January 1, 1995 – January 9, 2006	Elected in 1994. Reelected in 1996. Reelected in 1998. Reelected in 2000. Reelected in 2002. Reelected in 2004. Resigned to run for the Kentucky Senate.	2003–2015
Ron Weston (Louisville)	Democratic	February 17, 2006 – January 1, 2011	Elected to finish Clark's term. Reelected in 2006. Reelected in 2008. Retired.	2003–2015
Wade Hurt (Louisville)	Republican	January 1, 2011 – April 22, 2011	Elected in 2010. Lost renomination.	2003–2015
Wade Hurt (Louisville)	Democratic	April 22, 2011 – January 1, 2013	Elected in 2010. Lost renomination.	2003–2015
Jeffery Donohue (Louisville)	Democratic	January 1, 2013 – January 1, 2023	Elected in 2012. Reelected in 2014. Reelected in 2016. Reelected in 2018. Reelected in 2020. Lost reelection.	2003–2015
Jeffery Donohue (Louisville)	Democratic	January 1, 2013 – January 1, 2023	Elected in 2012. Reelected in 2014. Reelected in 2016. Reelected in 2018. Reelected in 2020. Lost reelection.	2015–2023
Emily Callaway (Louisville)	Republican	January 1, 2023 – present	Elected in 2022. Reelected in 2024. Reelected in 2026.	2023–present
