= J. J. Eubanks =

American basketball player (born 1968)

Personal information
- Born: November 13, 1968 (age 58) Louisville, Kentucky, U.S.
- Listed height: 6 ft 6 in (1.98 m)
- Listed weight: 210 lb (95 kg)

Career information
- High school: Seneca (Louisville, Kentucky)
- College: Sullivan (1987–1989); Tennessee State (1990–1991)
- NBA draft: 1991: undrafted
- Playing career: 1991–2004
- Position: Guard / forward

Career history
- 1991: Nashville Stars
- 1991: Music City Jammers
- 1991–1992: Louisville Shooters
- 1992: Basket Rimini
- 1993: Halifax Windjammers
- 1992–1993: Winnipeg Thunder
- 1993: Sporting B.C.
- 1994: Tri-City Chinook
- 1994: Rockford Lightning
- 1994–1995: Maccabi Ramat Gan
- 1995–1996: Hapoel Eilat
- 1996–1998: Toyota Motors Pacers
- 1999: Gallitos de Isabela
- 1999–2000: Estudiantes de Olavarría
- 2000: Cocodrilos de Caracas
- 2001: AEL Limassol
- 2001: Atenas
- 2001–2003: Viola Reggio Calabria
- 2003: Ironi Ramat Gan
- 2003–2004: Viola Reggio Calabria

Career highlights
- 2× LNB top scorer (1999–2000); 2× LNB champion (2000, 2002); LNB Best Foreign Player (2000); Israeli Premier League top scorer (1995); WBL Rookie of the Year (1991)

John Hugh Eubanks, known as J. J. Eubanks (born November 13, 1968) is an American former professional basketball player. A 6-foot-6 guard/forward, he played his first two years of college basketball at Sullivan College in the junior college circuit before transferring to Marshall (where he never played a game) and then to Tennessee State. After going undrafted in the 1991 NBA draft he started his professional career in the World Basketball League where he won the Rookie of the Year award. He had his first experience in Europe with Italian club Basket Rimini. On October 9, 1994, he scored 101 points during an Israeli league game between Maccabi Ramat Gan and Beitar Ramat Gan, setting a single-game scoring record for the league and becoming one of the players to score 100 or more points in a game. He was the top scorer in the 1994–95 Israel Basketball Premier League. In his career he played in Italy, Canada, Greece, Israel, Japan, Venezuela, Argentina and Cyprus, establishing himself as a prolific scorer: he won three scoring titles (one in Israel and two in Argentina) and set single-game scoring records in Israel (101 points) and Cyprus (84 points).

== High school career ==
Eubanks was born in Louisville, Kentucky and attended Seneca High School: during his first years at Seneca he was not selected to play for the varsity basketball team, but after a growth spurt from 5'10" (1.78 m) to 6'1" (1.86 m) in one year, he made the team and averaged 20 points and 10 rebounds per game in his senior season.

== College career ==
After graduating high school in 1987, Eubanks chose to play for Sullivan College of Technology and Design, that competed in the Kentucky Junior College Athletic Conference. During his time at Sullivan he had several games where he scored 20 or more points, especially in his sophomore season. On December 17, 1987, he scored 42 points against Aquinas Junior College. On December 2, 1988, he scored a then career-best and Sullivan school record 47 points against Edison State on 18/24 shooting (6/10 on three-pointers) and 5/6 on free throws. On January 7, 1989, against Cuyahoga he scored a career-high 48 points (beating his previous record), shooting 17/24 from the field (7/13 from three) and 7/8 on free throws. He also recorded 8 rebounds in the game.

After two years at Sullivan Eubanks committed to Division I school Marshall; however, after coach Rick Huckabay left before the start of the 1989–90 season, being replaced by Dana Altman, he reconsidered his choice. He quit the team in late November 1989 and transferred to Tennessee State: as a result, he had to sit out the entire season, and he was not eligible to play until December 15, 1990. He debuted for the Tigers scoring 30 points on December 17, 1990, against Ohio State. On January 22, 1991, he was named OVC Player of the Week, and on January 29, 2991, he was named Co-Newcomer of the Week. Eubanks led Tennessee State with 24.2 points per game in 19 games played, playing 33.8 minutes per game. He also averaged 6.7 rebounds, 0.9 assists and 1 steal per game.

=== College statistics ===
Year	Team	GP	GS	MPG	FG%	3P%	FT%	RPG	APG	SPG	BPG	PPG
1990–91	Tennessee State	19	14	33.8	.458	.356	.806	6.7	0.9	1.0	0.4	24.2

== Professional career ==
Eubanks started his professional career in 1991, signing for the Nashville Stars in the World Basketball League after participating in a free agent camp. At the end of the season he was named the WBL Rookie of the Year having averaged 17.1 points per game. After playing in the WBL in the summer he joined the Global Basketball Association in the winter of 1991: he was a territorial draft pick for the Music City Jammers and started the season there, averaging 11.6 points per game, and was then traded to the Louisville Shooters in December, making his debut on December 11, 1991, scoring 14 points against the Albany Sharp Shooters. In the month of February 1992 he was traded to the Albany Sharp Shooters. However, he did not play for Albany and moved to Europe instead, signing for Italian club Basket Rimini: he debuted against Philips Milano scoring 44 points in 38 minutes of play. After 4 games (during which he averaged 32.5 points per game) he was dismissed from the team.

In 1993, Eubanks joined the Halifax Windjammers in the newly formed National Basketball League; he also played for the Winnipeg Thunder. He signed for Greek team Sporting B.C., briefly playing there before moving back to the United States, joining the Tri-City Chinook in the CBA: after 8 games averaging 5.3 points, 2.1 rebounds and 0.3 assists in 12.6 minutes per game, he signed for the Rockford Lightning, where he posted averages of 6 points and 1 rebound per game in 19.5 minutes of playing time. In the summer of 1994 he participated in the Indiana Pacers rookie-free agent camp in the summer of 1994, averaging 16 points in 15 minutes per game during preseason games, but he did not make the final roster for the 1994–95 NBA season.

In 1994, Eubanks signed for Israeli club Maccabi Ramat Gan. On October 9, 1994, he scored 101 points during an Israeli league game between Maccabi Ramat Gan and Beitar Ramat Gan, shooting 40/57 from the field (9/22 from the three-point line) and 12/14 on free throws. He set a single-game scoring record for the league and became one of the players to score 100 or more points in a game. He played 26 games in the season, averaging 5.9 rebounds, 1.5 assists and a league-leading 30.9 points per game, shooting 43% from three and 92% from the free throw line. The following season he joined Hapoel Eilat, and played 22 games in the 1995–96 season, averaging 22.4 points, 4.8 rebounds and 1.7 assists shooting 43% from three and 83% on free throws.

In 1996, he left Israel and played two years in Japan with Toyota Motors Pacers; he then joined Puerto Rican side Gallitos de Isabela. In 1999 he moved to Argentina, where he signed for Estudiantes de Olavarría. In his first season he led the league in scoring, averaging 25.9 points in 41 games (1,060 total points), and won the league title. In the 1999–2000 season he led the LNB in scoring again, averaging 27.5 points in 55 games (1,514 total points, one of the best results in LNB history). On November 14, 1999, Eubanks scored 55 points against Andino in a 109–83 win, shooting 19/25 (7/9 from the three-point range) and 10/11 on free throws. At the end of the season he won his second personal championship, was named the top scorer, and received the LNB Best Foreign Player award. He left Argentina for Venezuela in 2000, joining Cocodrilos de Caracas: he then signed for Atenas, and played part of the 2001–02 season there, thus winning his second LNB championship. In 2001 he also played in Cyprus for AEL Limassol: in February 2001 he scored 84 points in a 152–73 win against PAEEK, beating the previous league record of 75 that had been established by Tony Harris in 1995.

Eubanks returned to Italy to play for Viola Reggio Calabria, and debuted for the team on the 13th round, playing against De Vizia Avellino, scoring 12 points. He played 25 games that season (24 starts), averaging 18.8 points and 3.8 rebounds per game, shooting 38.4% from three and 88.8% from the free throw line. In the following season he was second in the league in scoring with 19.6 points per game behind Boris Gorenc of Metis Varese. That year he shot 40% from three and 92.9% from the free throw line. He then started the 2003–04 season with Ironi Ramat Gan, but he played only one game, scoring 19 points and recording 6 rebounds and 1 assist in 31 minutes of play. After that, he came back to Reggio Calabria where he played one last season, averaging 15.7 points per game.
