= Ethan Driskell =

American football player (born 2000)

No. 75 – Kansas City Chiefs
- Position: Offensive tackle
- Roster status: Practice squad

Personal information
- Born: June 29, 2000 (age 26); Louisville, Kentucky, U.S.
- Listed height: 6 ft 8 in (2.03 m)
- Listed weight: 313 lb (142 kg)

Career information
- High school: Holy Cross (Louisville)
- College: Marshall (2019–2023)
- NFL draft: 2024: undrafted

Career history
- Kansas City Chiefs (2024–present)

Awards and highlights
- Third-team All-Sun Belt (2023)

Career NFL statistics as of 2025
- Games played: 2
- Games started: 0
- Stats at Pro Football Reference

Ethan Driskell (born June 29, 2000) is an American professional football offensive tackle for the Kansas City Chiefs of the National Football League (NFL). He played college football for the Marshall Thundering Herd.

== Early life ==
Driskell grew up in Louisville, Kentucky and attended Holy Cross High School, where he lettered in football and basketball. He committed to play college football at Marshall University.

== College career ==
Driskell was redshirted during his true freshman season in 2019. During the 2020 season, he played in nine games. During the 2021 season, he appeared in all 13 games as a reserve offensive lineman. During the 2022 season, he played in and started all 13 games in a starting role on the offensive line at the tackle position. During the 2023 season, he played in all 13 games and started 11 of them.

== Professional career ==
Pre-draft measurables
Height	Weight	Arm length	Hand span	Wingspan
6 ft 8 3/8 in (2.04 m)	313 lb (142 kg)	35 3/8 in (0.90 m)	10 1/2 in (0.27 m)	6 ft 11 1/2 in (2.12 m)
All values from NFL Combine

Driskell was signed by the Kansas City Chiefs as an undrafted free agent after the 2024 NFL draft. He was also selected by the Birmingham Stallions in the tenth round of the 2024 UFL draft on July 17. Driskell, an UDFA, was notably among the 53 players to make the Chiefs initial Week 1 roster.

On August 30, 2026, Driskell was waived by the Chiefs as a part of final roster cuts. On September 1, the Chiefs re–signed Driskell to their practice squad.
