= Spencerian College =

- Type: Private, for-profit
- Established: 1892
- President: Glenn Sullivan
- Location: Louisville, Kentucky; 38.2321°N 85.6313°W
- Website: http://www.spencerian.edu

Spencerian College
- Type: Private, for-profit
- Established: 1892
- President: Glenn Sullivan
- Location: Lexington, Kentucky; 38.0216°N 84.5447°W
- Website: http://www.spencerian.edu

Spencerian College was a private, for-profit career college in Louisville and Lexington, Kentucky. It was founded in 1892 as the Spencerian Commercial School, a private for-profit business school, by Enos Spencer.

In June 2018, Spencerian College and Sullivan College of Technology and Design (formerly Louisville Technical Institute) were authorized by the Southern Association of Colleges and Schools Commission on Colleges to merge their programs and students into the regionally-accredited Sullivan University and cease operations as separate institutions. Since June 2018, degree and certificate programs from the former Spencerian College are included within Sullivan University's College of Allied Health and its College of Nursing.

== Legal Issues ==
In January 2013, prior to the purchase of Spencerian College by Sullivan University, Kentucky Attorney General Jack Conway filed a consumer-protection lawsuit against Spencerian College for alleged misrepresentation of job placement data. The suit alleges that Spencerian College knowingly and intentionally provided false job placement data to lure students "into student loan arrangements and to join their for-profit institution." The disparities between job placement numbers reported on the Spencerian College website and those reported to Spencerian College's institutional accrediting organization differed by as much as 40%, according to the suit. As part of the purchase of Spencerian College, Sullivan University agreed to forgive $1.7 million in student loans made to 668 students between the years 2007 and 2011.
