= Sullivan College of Technology and Design =

Coordinates: 38°12′00.9″N 85°41′20.2″W

- Former names: Louisville Technical Institute
- Type: Private, for-profit
- Established: 1961
- President: Glenn Sullivan
- Location: Louisville, Kentucky, U.S.
- Website: www.sullivan.edu

Sullivan College of Technology and Design was a private, technology-based for-profit career college in Louisville, Kentucky that was originally known as Louisville Technical Institute. It was renamed on June 29, 2009.

In June, 2018, Sullivan College of Technology and Design and Spencerian College were authorized by the Southern Association of Colleges and Schools Commission on Colleges, to merge their programs and students into the regionally-accredited Sullivan University and cease operations as separate institutions. In June, 2018, Sullivan University's College of Information and Computer Technology was renamed Sullivan University's College of Technology and Design, combining the university's existing programs with those of the former Sullivan College of Technology and Design.

Sullivan Tech closed in 2022 due to lack of attendance.

== Notable alumni ==
- J.J. Eubanks (born 1968), American basketball player, scored 101 points during an Israeli league game, was the top scorer in the 1994-95 Israel Basketball Premier League.
