= Perry B. Clark =

American politician

Member of the Kentucky Senate from the 37th district
- In office February 16, 2006 – January 1, 2021
- Preceded by: Larry Saunders
- Succeeded by: David Yates

Member of the Kentucky House of Representatives from the 37th district
- In office January 1, 1995 – January 9, 2006
- Preceded by: Paul Clark
- Succeeded by: Ron Weston

Personal details
- Born: September 30, 1957 (age 68) Frankfort, Kentucky, United States
- Party: Democratic

Perry Brian Clark (born September 30, 1957) is an American politician who served as a member of the Kentucky Senate for the 37th district from 2006 to 2021. Clark also served in the Kentucky House of Representatives from 1995 to 2006, resigning to run for the Kentucky Senate special election in the 37th District.

He has been a member of several committees, including the Task Force on Economic Development and the Administrative Regulation Review Subcommittee.

Perry Clark was first elected to the house in 1994, succeeding his father Paul Clark. He resigned his seat in the house in order to run for a special election to the senate. The seat had been vacant since January 2005 when the candidate who won the election was determined to be ineligible to serve. He retired from the senate in 2020.
