= Wade Hurt (politician) =

American politician

Member of the Kentucky House of Representatives from the 37th district
- In office January 1, 2011 – January 1, 2013
- Preceded by: Ron Weston
- Succeeded by: Jeffery Donohue

Personal details
- Born: February 20, 1967 (age 59)
- Party: Democratic (since 2011); Republican (until 2011)

Wendell Wade Hurt (born February 20, 1967) is an American politician from Kentucky who was a member of the Kentucky House of Representatives from 2011 to 2013. Hurt was elected in 2010 as a Republican after incumbent representative Ron Weston retired. He switched party affiliation to the Democratic party in April 2011, but was defeated for the Democratic nomination by Jeffery Donohue in May 2012.
