= Felix Newton Pitt =

Monsignor Felix Newton Pitt (1894 in Fairfield, Kentucky – 1971), attended the St. Meinrad Seminary in Indiana from 1911 to 1915. He held a Swiss academic doctorate. One of his achievements was founding and organizing the Catholic school office in Louisville, Kentucky. In 1928 and 1929 while Secretary of the Catholic School Board he formed the Catholic Recreation Commission. He was a pioneer on WHAS radio in ecumenical broadcast. He has also served on the post-World War II international committee. In 1949 when he was 55 years old he founded Pitt Academy a school for special kids. It was the first facility in Louisville for developmentally disabled students. Msgr. Pitt is also an author who in 1951 wrote the book "Catholic Education Today and Tomorrow".

A biography was published in 2016 by his nephew on his sister's side, Pitt G. Thome: Journey of a Country Soul: The Life and Ministry of Monsignor Felix N. Pitt, Kentucky's Preeminent Catholic Educator of the 20th Century. While it contains personal anecdotes, much of the book focuses on researched historical information placed in the context of events as they occurred.

== See also ==
- List of people from the Louisville metropolitan area
