= Taylor County High School (Kentucky) =

Location
- 2705 Old Hodgenville Rd; Campbellsville, Taylor County, Kentucky 42718; United States; 37.3513°N 85.3361°W

Information
- Type: Public
- School district: Taylor County School District
- Principal: Sarah Tucker
- Teaching staff: 48.44 (on an FTE basis)
- Grades: 9–12
- Enrollment: 823 (2023–2024)
- Student to teacher ratio: 16.99
- Campus type: Small city
- Colors: Red, gray and black
- Nickname: Cardinals
- Website: Official site

Taylor County High School is a U.S. high school (grades 9 to 12) in the city of Campbellsville, Taylor County, Kentucky. It is one of two high schools in Campbellsville, the other being Campbellsville High School.

== Band ==
The band is under the direction of Stephen Bishop, and participates in marching band contests sanctioned by the Kentucky Music Educators Association, Bands of America, and the MidStates Band Association throughout the marching season. The marching band has made eleven KMEA state finals appearances, and has won the Mid-States Championships Class Champion title in 2011, as well as consecutively each marching season from 2014 to 2024.

The band also includes a concert band, which runs throughout the entire school year and a pep band, which performs at home games during the basketball and football seasons. They also participate at many community events throughout the year, most notably, the Christmas, Homecoming, and Fourth of July parades.

== Choir ==
The school is also noted for its choir program, led by Jericho McCoy. Most notable is the Show Choir, which has performed at several high-profile locations around the country, including New York City, Boston, Chicago, and most recently Walt Disney World.

== Athletics ==
The school competes in football, soccer, basketball, baseball, softball, volleyball, golf, swimming, tennis, track and field, bowling, fishing, wrestling, and cross country, on the varsity levels. Taylor County High School has won three team sport, girls' bowling in 2013, boys' bowling in 2016, and boys' golf in 2018. J.B. Holmes won the KHSAA Boys' Individual Golf Championship in 1998. Taylor County High School won 1999 region football.

== Notable faculty ==
- Betty Jane Gorin-Smith, Kentucky historian

== Notable alumni ==
- Clem Haskins, former NBA player and college basketball coach at University of Minnesota
- J. B. Holmes, PGA Tour golfer
