= St. Francis School (Austin, Texas) =

Location
- 300 E. Huntland Drive; Austin, Texas 78767; United States
- Coordinates: 30°19′53″N 97°42′36″W

Information
- Established: 1967
- School district: IMSA
- Head of School: Emily Vitris
- Faculty: 67
- Grades: Pre-Kindergarten - 8th Grade
- Enrollment: 400 (2015–2016)
- Color: Maroon
- Mascot: Wolf
- Website: www.stfrancis-school.org

St. Francis School is a private interdenominational school in Austin, Texas. It serves grades PK-8 and has around 400 students. Although the school is interdenominational they have a chapel on Friday mornings that features the teachings of St. Francis and his love for people of all kinds (and animals). The school serves students from 65 zip codes throughout the Austin area and represents a range of socio-economic levels.

== History ==
St. Francis School was founded in 1967 by a small group of parents and teachers. The school originally held classes in the Sunday school classrooms at a local church. In 1987, the school opened in an old office building and taught students up to the fifth grade. However, the student population soon outgrew the size of the office building and the lease of the building ended in 1995. In the fall of 1995, St. Francis School opened their doors at their current location with a renovation in 2011. The school is currently located in East North Central Austin in the Highland neighborhood off of I-35. It is in a former office building and owns a gym, learning center, soccer field, and playground separate from the main school building.

== Mission ==
The school's mission statement is as follows:

St. Francis School shall be an interdenominational school committed:

- to low student-teacher ratios and attention to the needs of every student;
- to excellence in achievement without exclusivity in admissions;
- to a student body that is integrated racially, ethnically, economically, and religiously;
- and to an atmosphere that is both supportive of Christian values and welcoming to children of all faiths.

== Athletics ==
The school athletics program, covering grades 5-8, includes Track, Basketball, Volleyball, Soccer, Ultimate Frisbee, and Flag Football. All teams compete in the Austin Inter-Parochial League (AIPL). The school competes academically in the Private School Interscholastic Association (PSIA).
