= Walden School (Louisville) =

Coordinates: 38°15′41.9″N 85°38′15.3″W

- Louisville, Kentucky; U.S.

Information
- Type: Private
- Opened: 1975
- School district: Kindergarten
- Website: www.walden-school.org

Walden School is a nonprofit private school in Louisville, Kentucky. It offers Kindergarten through twelfth grade education and it is the 11th largest K-8 private school in Louisville.

Walden school emphasize the importance of small class sizes by limiting the lower grades to no more than 16 students, and the other grades to 18 students. In practice, the school's classes, for lower grades, are usually closer to a dozen of students. The student/teacher ratio is 8:1 in grades K-8 and in the High School division.

== History ==
Walden School was founded in 1975 on the former campus of the Kentucky Military Institute on LaGrange Road. The school was founded by Dr. Edward F. Vermillion, a former principal in the Oldham County school district and a member of the Anchorage School Board. Though the 1970s was a time of great experiments in education, Dr. Vermillion said that he wanted to take the best parts of traditional education, but to combine them some of the gentler aspects of more experimental techniques. "At Walden," he said, "we've married the traditional school to concepts of love, compassion." Vermillion's obituary in 2004 noted that the school "stresses a nurturing environment, small classes, a college-preparatory curriculum and parental involvement.... In its early days, the school was noted for its unorthodox teaching methods -- one shop class learned carpentry by building its own classroom out of an old Quonset hut. A history class studied the first Thanksgiving by re-creating it in a meadow." The school was named Walden after the classic work by Henry David Thoreau. Thoreau's 1854 book Walden; or, Life in the Woods is about his experiences living in a cabin he built near Walden Pond for 2 years, 2 months, and 2 days. Henry inspired many of the school's ideas and beliefs, and many of his quotes are painted on the walls.

The Walden School is now housed on Westport Road, near Hubbards Lane. The school moved into a building that was once a public school, Stivers Elementary, after it closed in 1980. Two large expansions have been added on to the older building by the school, including a gym and high school, dedicated in February 2004, cost $1.8 million. The second addition, a library and music hall, was added in March 2019.

== Sports ==
In October 2010, Walden dedicated a new track and field facility, designed to be one of the premier tracks in the state, including several state-of-the-art features. Walden's decision to invest in this facility reflects the school's high participation rate in the sport. About 70 percent of Walden's middle school students and about 50 percent of its high school students, participate in the school's competitive track and field teams. (Lower School students also participate in track and field "clinics.")

== Tuition ==
Walden's average tuition ranks as one of the highest in the LISC association schools, mostly due to its small size. About 30 percent of Walden's students received financial aid. As of 2019 Walden has approximately 300 students throughout all grades, with an actual capacity of 312 total in the Lower and Middle Schools and 100 in the High School.

== Academics ==
Walden is divided into three divisions. The Lower School serves K-4th grade, the Middle School serves 5th through 8th grade, and the High School serves 9th through 12th grade.

All three divisions emphasize strong academics, according to the school's website. Walden High School teachers are certified to teach 18 Advanced Placement courses, designed to prepare a student to do college-level work.

In 2009, 94 percent of Walden students earned a 3 or higher, including 100 percent of the students taking Science, Human Geography and European History exams; of the students taking Physics, Calculus AB and Calculus BC exams, 100 percent scored a five. In the 2015–2016 academic year, 75 percent of Walden high school students had taken at least one AP exam.

In 2009, according to the website, Lower School students taking the Stanford Achievement Test averaged in the 81st percentile in Reading and Math, and the 85th percentile in Science. This means that Walden students scored in the top 19 percent nationally in Reading and Math and in the top 15 percent in Science. That same year, the school reported that about half of their middle school students scored in the 95th percentile (or above) in at least one of the Stanford Achievement subtests (math, reading, science or social studies) and qualified for the Johns-Hopkins Center for Talented Youth Program.

Louisville Magazine's 2016-'17 School Guide reported that 100 percent of Walden High School students take the ACT, with an average score of 25.5. This was the second-highest score listed for any school in which all students took the test.

== Traditions ==
In Walden's 40-plus years, it has developed several traditions. They include:

- "Beatrix Potter Tea Party" for Kindergarten Students.
- Sit-down Thanksgiving dinner, in which the entire school eats at the same time.

== See also ==
- List of schools in Louisville, Kentucky
