= Jeffersontown High School =

Public high school in Kentucky, US

Location
- 9600 Old Six Mile Lane; Louisville, Kentucky 40299; United States; 38°12′03″N 85°34′52″W

Information
- Type: Public high school
- School district: Jefferson County Public Schools
- Principal: Jarrad Durham
- Teaching staff: 71.40 (FTE) (2023–2024)
- Grades: 9–12
- Enrollment: 1,096 (2023–2024)
- Student to teacher ratio: 15.35 (2023–2024)
- Colors: Maroon & white
- Team name: Chargers
- Website: jefferson.kyschools.us/schools/profiles/jeffersontown-high

Jeffersontown High School is a public high school in the Jefferson County public schools district in Kentucky. The school is a Career Magnet Academy with strong ties to numerous business/education partnerships within the region including the city of Jeffersontown and the Bluegrass Industrial Park community. The current principal is Jarred Durham.

== Demographics ==
Enrollment by Race/Ethnicity
| School Year | American Indian / Alaska Native | Asian | Black | Hispanic | Native Hawaiian / Pacific Islander | White | Two or More Races |
|---|---|---|---|---|---|---|---|
| 2018–19 | 1 (0.1%) | 31 (3%) | 368 (38%) | 128 (10%) | 2 (0.2%) | 411 (42%) | 35 (4%) |

== Notable alumni ==
- Troy E. Black – United States Marine (born 1969)
- Daniel Ross – American football player (born 1993)
- Chuck Smith – American football coach (born 1957)
