= Louisville Classical Academy =

Coordinates: 38°13′31.7″N 85°41′36.9″W

Location
- 2005 Douglass Blvd. Louisville, Kentucky

Information
- Type: Independent, Nonsectarian
- Locale: The Highlands of Louisville
- Grades: Preschool through 10
- Average class size: 8
- Mascot: Pegasus
- Website: louisvilleclassicalacademy.org

Louisville Classical Academy (or LCA) is a nonsectarian, independent school from preschool through grade 10 in the 2026–27 school year, adding one grade per year to reach grade 12 by 2028–29. The school is located in the Highlands neighborhood of Louisville, Kentucky. LCA provides a classical liberal arts education founded in literature, Latin, Greek, mathematics, and music.

== History ==
LCA opened as a full-time institution in Prospect, Kentucky, in 2007. The school was founded by Marcia Cassady (a former lawyer), Amanda Proietti, and Gerald Proietti.

== Accreditation ==
LCA is a provisional member of the Independent Schools Association of the Central States (ISACS) as of October 29, 2024.
