= Ron Weston =

American politician

Member of the Kentucky House of Representatives from the 37th district
- In office February 17, 2006 – January 1, 2011
- Preceded by: Perry B. Clark
- Succeeded by: Wade Hurt

Member of the Louisville Metro Council from the 13th district
- In office 2003–2006
- Preceded by: Constituency established
- Succeeded by: Vicki Aubrey Welch

President of the Louisville Metro Council
- In office 2003–2004
- Preceded by: Constituency established
- Succeeded by: Kelly Downard

Personal details
- Born: April 11, 1948 (age 78)
- Party: Democratic

Ronald Eugene Weston (born April 11, 1948) is an American politician from Kentucky who was a member of the Kentucky House of Representatives from 2006 to 2011. Weston was first elected in a February 2006 special election following the resignation of representative Perry B. Clark. He did not seek reelection in 2010.
