= Bethlehem High School (Kentucky) =

Location
- 309 West Stephen Foster Avenue; Bardstown, (Nelson County), Kentucky 40004; United States
- Coordinates: 37°48′35″N 85°28′14″W

Information
- Type: Private, coeducational
- Religious affiliation: Christianity
- Denomination: Roman Catholic
- Established: 1819; 207 years ago
- Principal: Sara Thurmond
- Grades: 9-12
- Student to teacher ratio: 15:1
- Hours in school day: 7
- Campus: Exurban
- Colors: Royal blue and gold
- Team name: Eagles / Banshees
- Tuition: $8,000
- Athletic Director: Gilly Simpson
- Website: http://www.bethlehemhigh.org

Bethlehem High School is a coeducational, Roman Catholic high school in Bardstown, Kentucky, United States. It is part of the Archdiocese of Louisville, and is one of only two coeducational high schools among the nine overseen by the archdiocese (the other being Holy Cross High School in Louisville).

Its sports teams have had successes in the 21st century. In 2006, the boys' soccer team won the Class A state title, the football team beat Bardstown for the 9th district title, and boys' basketball won the 19th District Championship. In 2008, the boys' soccer team again won the Class A State title, and the cheerleading squad placed first at the Jamfest National Championship Competition. The boys' soccer team won the Class A State Championship for the third time in 2011.

== History ==
Bethlehem High School began in 1819 when Bishop Flaget requested the Sisters of Charity of Nazareth to open an elementary day school for the children in the Bardstown area. Brother David, the founder of this religious order, provided the school, which was staffed by Sisters Harriet Gardiner, Polly Beavin and Nancy Lynd. The name "Bethlehem" was given to this new school to signify the birth of the first branch house stemming from Nazareth, the Motherhouse of the Sisters of Charity of Nazareth.

Bethlehem continued as an elementary school until 1911, when St. Joseph Preparatory High School for boys was founded. The boys attended "St. Joe Prep", as the school was affectionately called, while girls continued their schooling at Bethlehem. Bethlehem's first high school graduating class was in 1913. From 1911 until 1953, Bethlehem continued as a co-educational elementary school, and a girls' high school. In the fall of 1953, St. Joseph Parochial Elementary School (now St. Joseph School), built by St. Joseph Parish, opened. Bethlehem was operated exclusively as a parish high school for girls, no longer owned by the Sisters, but staffed by them.

In 1968, St. Joe Prep closed. In 1970, Bethlehem became a co-educational high school, as it continues today. Bethlehem is the only Roman Catholic high school in the Archdiocese of Louisville outside of Jefferson County. It serves eight counties and 35 parishes, with a current enrollment of around 300 students. The school mascots are the Eagles for the boys' teams and the Banshees for the girls' teams.

== Extracurricular activities ==
Bethlehem High School has a variety of extracurricular activities in sports and non-athletic areas, including drama, speech, National Honor Society, Spirit Club, choir, student council, golf, and cross country.

== Notable alumni ==
- Thabiso Khumalo, former South African footballer
- J. Mark Spalding, 12th bishop of the Diocese of Nashville
