= Sayers Classical Academy =

Coordinates: 38°08′09.9″N 85°34′38.9″W

- Louisville, Kentucky; United States

Information
- Type: Private
- Motto: Christ, Classics, Community
- Religious affiliation: Christian
- Established: 1991
- Director: Sandra Lawson
- Grades: Pre-K through 12
- Athletics: Volleyball, Basketball, Cross-Country
- Website: www.sayersclassicalacademy.org

Sayers Classical Academy is a private, classical Christian school located in Louisville, Kentucky, United States. It serves students from Pre-K through 12th grade.

The school is named after Dorothy Sayers, whose essay, "The Lost Tools of Learning", has been highly influential in the modern resurgence of classical education.

== See also ==
- List of schools in Louisville, Kentucky
