= Notre Dame Academy (Louisville, Kentucky) =

Catholic regional school in Louisville, Kentucky

Location
- Louisville, Kentucky; United States
- 38°10′26.4″N 85°49′52.3″W

Information
- Type: Private regional Catholic school
- Established: 2004
- Mascot: Saint

Notre Dame Academy was founded in 2004 when St. Denis, St. Helen, and St. Lawrence Schools combined. NDA was the first regional school formed in the Archdiocese of Louisville. The school mascot is the Saint.
