= Pitt Academy =

Location
- 7515 Westport Rd. Louisville, (Jefferson County), Kentucky 40222; United States
- Coordinates: 38°16'23"N 85°36'45"W

Information
- Type: Private High school
- Religious affiliation: Roman Catholic
- Established: 1949
- Grades: K-12
- Colors: Blue and gold
- Mascot: Bear

Pitt Academy is located in Louisville, Kentucky, United States. It was founded in 1949 by Monsignor Felix Newton Pitt, for special needs children. The school participates in the Special Olympics.

There is a yearly barbecue in May of each year. The cooking team of Saint Pius X of Owensboro, Kentucky comes to help.

== See also ==
- List of schools in Louisville
