= Eminence Independent Schools =

Location
- Eminence, Kentucky

District information
- Type: Independent
- Established: 1902
- Superintendent: Buddy Berry

Students and staff
- Enrollment: 904
- District mascot: Warriors

Other information
- Website: http://www.eminence.kyschools.us

Eminence Independent Schools is one of two school districts in Henry County, Kentucky and is divided into three schools, Eminence Elementary, Eminence Middle, and Eminence High. All three schools are located on the same campus and share some of the same facilities, like a gym, cafeteria, computer lab, and library.

The district's original school was established in 1902 at its current premises, but burned down in 1942. It was then rebuilt in the same location.

The district boundaries extend well past the city limits of Eminence, especially on the north and west sides. A small portion of the district lies within Shelby County, making it one of a very small number of Kentucky school districts with territory in more than one county.
