= Campbellsville High School =

Coordinates: 37°20′19″N 85°20′54″W

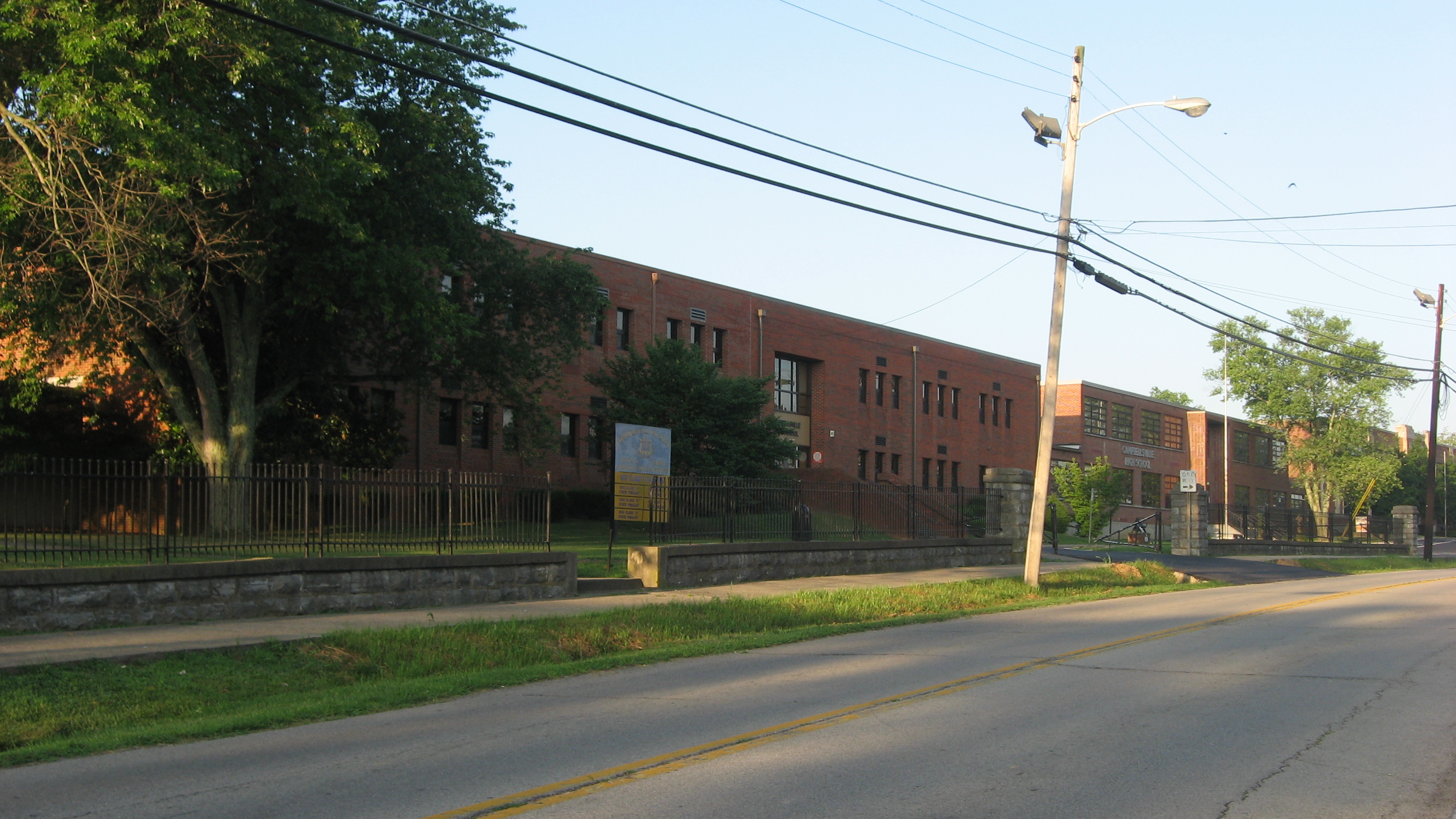

Location
- 230 W. Main Street; Campbellsville, Taylor County, Kentucky 42718; United States

Information
- Type: Public
- Motto: "A caring, community school"
- Established: 1865; 161 years ago
- School district: Campbellsville Independent School District
- Principal: Weston Jones
- Teaching staff: 22.50 (on an FTE basis)
- Grades: 9-12
- Enrollment: 345 (2023–2024)
- Student to teacher ratio: 15.33
- Campus type: Small city
- Colors: Purple and Gold
- Nickname: Eagles
- Website: http://www.cville.k12.ky.us/

Campbellsville High School, established in 1865, is a U.S. high school (grades 9 to 12) in the city of Campbellsville, Taylor County, Kentucky. It is one of the two high schools in Campbellsville, the other being Taylor County High School.

== Athletics ==
Campbellsville Independent High School offers ten varsity sports for boys and girls chartered by the KHSAA.

- Fall
  - Football
  - Soccer
  - Volleyball
  - Golf
  - Cross-country
- Winter
  - Swimming
  - Basketball
  - Bowling
- Spring
  - Baseball
  - Softball
  - Track
  - Tennis

== Clubs and organizations ==
Campbellsville High School also offers several clubs such as National Beta Club, FCA, Student Council, FEA, and FCCLA

== Marching band ==
The Campbellsville Marching Eagles is the school marching band. The current director are Mallory Arnett and assistant director Kenny Conrow. Campbellsville High School's marching band has appeared in KMEA a total of eight times. In 1987, the Campbellsville High School band received first place in Class 1A. Their director at the time was Robert Harrod.

== Notable alumni ==
- Malachi Corley (born 2002), college football wide receiver for the Western Kentucky Hilltoppers
- Max Wise (born 1975), former FBI agent serving as a member of the Kentucky Senate
