= Highlands Latin School =

Private school in Kentucky, United States

Location
- 10901 Shelbyville Rd. (Spring Meadows Campus); 2800 Frankfort Ave. (Crescent Hill Campus); 38°15′15.7″N 85°41′24.3″W

Information
- Religious affiliation: Christian
- Founded: 2000
- Founder: Cheryl Lowe
- Locale: Louisville, Kentucky
- Grades: Kindergarten through 12
- Enrollment: 718
- Average class size: 16
- Athletics: Tennis, Volleyball, Basketball, Cross Country, Golf, Soccer, Baseball, Field Hockey, Softball
- Website: thelatinschool.org

Highlands Latin School is a private classical Christian school located in Louisville, Kentucky, United States. It serves students from Kindergarten through 12th grade. It was founded in 2000 by Latin textbook author Cheryl Lowe and her family. The school currently enrolls 718 full-time students in two campuses plus 300 students in a two-day Cottage School.

It is certified by the Kentucky Non-Public School Commission. It is a member of the Classical Latin School Association.

== Academics ==
The school gives special emphasis to Latin, mathematics, and music, which it calls the "three universal languages". Its education is founded on the belief that the study of ancient Greece and Rome give students a basis of comparison for English and American History.

Students study Latin starting in second grade and Greek in seventh grade. In 2015, 7 of 16 seniors were recognized as National Merit Finalists or Commended students.

== History ==
Highlands Latin started as a part of Memoria Press, a classical Christian curriculum company founded by Cheryl Lowe, but since 2007, it has been an independent for-profit school owned by the Lowe family.

== Controversy ==
In September 2024, Highlands Latin School was the subject of an in depth report by Louisville's Courier Journal. The article cited several accounts of student mistreatment by faculty, including belittling, shaming, and bullying.

== See also ==
- List of schools in Louisville, Kentucky
