= Mercy Academy =

Location
- 5801 Fegenbush Lane; Louisville, (Jefferson County), Kentucky 40228; United States; 38°10′12″N 85°38′24″W

Information
- Type: Private, all-girls
- Religious affiliation: Roman Catholic
- Established: 1885
- Founder: Catherine McAuley
- President: Becky Montague
- Principal: Cynthia Smith-Ough
- Grades: 9–12
- Gender: Female
- Enrollment: 500 (2020)
- Average class size: 14
- Student to teacher ratio: 12:1
- Campus size: 24 acres (9.7 ha)
- Campus type: Suburban / industrial
- Colors: Columbia blue and gold
- Mascot: Jaguar (formerly Missile)
- Team name: Jaguars
- Accreditation: Southern Association of Colleges and Schools
- Tuition: $13,800
- Website: https://www.mercyacademy.com/

Mercy Academy, in full, The Academy of Our Lady of Mercy, is an all-girls Roman Catholic high school in Louisville, Kentucky that opened in 1885 and is sponsored by the Sisters of Mercy.

In 1869, the first Sisters of Mercy in Louisville arrived from their community in St. Louis to run a struggling Federal Marine Hospital. They began a teaching ministry. By 1872, they had established St. Catherine Academy, and in 1885, they conferred the first high school diplomas under the name of The Academy of Our Lady of Mercy. The high school program continued to grow until a new facility was needed. The Sisters opened a new academy building at 1176 East Broadway in 1901, where it was to remain until 2007.

Mercy Academy is in the Roman Catholic Archdiocese of Louisville, and is currently located on a 24-acre (97,000 m^{2}) campus at 5801 Fegenbush Lane in Southeast Jefferson County near the Hurstbourne Lane Extension, with General Electric's Appliance Park complex on the opposite side of Fegenbush Lane, though hidden from direct view by a wooded buffer zone. Mercy was named a Blue Ribbon School by the U.S. Department of Education in 2000. Mercy was the first all-girls school in the nation, and first school in Kentucky, to receive STEM certification in 2016 from AdvancED.

== Short facts ==
Mercy's student teacher ratio is 12:1 and the average number of students in a grade is 130.

Becky Wise Montague became the school's president in 2018.

Mercy Academy holds a fundraiser walk every year for financial aid and raise around 90,000 to 100,000 dollars each year.

Mercy Academy currently has 35 clubs and committees.

Mercy Academy currently has 15 sports teams.

Mercy has a 100% average graduation rate.

== History ==
Mercy Academy was founded by Catherine McCauley and the Sisters of Mercy in 1885. The Sisters Of Mercy was a congregation founded by Catherine McCauley herself, in Dublin, Ireland, in 1831. The sisters came to the United States in 1854 to establish many schools and hospitals throughout the country, starting in New York and California. They eventually spread throughout the country, and established two private, Roman Catholic all-girls high schools; Assumption High School and Academy of Our Lady Of Mercy. Mercy was originally built in downtown Louisville on Broadway, before it moved to the Fegenbush location in 2007.

== Expansions ==
Since moving, Mercy has expanded their campus to include Evan's Park, which has their very own soccer and softball fields, as well as tennis courts, and a track. The only two sports that cannot be practiced at Evan's Park are bowling and swimming. In Addition to the building of Evan's Park they also expanded their STEM program after receiving the first all girls STEM certification in the nation. One of the most advanced projects the Mercy Academy STEM program has taken on is Mammoth Cave National Park exploration. The students and faculty of the STEM program spend months designing and building underwater robots to help map out the national park's aquatic floor. The last major expansion they have completed was actually done in the past year. Preparing for the 2021–2022 school year, Mercy Academy created a house system for all students and faculty. The house system divides each student and faculty member into one of 6 houses (or group communities). These houses are made up of a variety of freshman, sophomores, juniors, seniors, and faculty members. The house names are Callaghan, Doyle, Ignatius, McLaughlin, Siena, and Warde.

== Rewards and achievements ==
Mercy Academy has gained a wide variety of rewards and achievements since opening in 1885. In 2000 we were named a Blue Ribbon School by the U.S. Department of Education, as well as the first all girls STEM certified school in the nation, and the first STEM certified school in Kentucky. More recently, Mercy has won quite a few sports achievements as well. In November 2021 Mercy Academy's Volleyball team came in second in the KHSAA Kentucky State Championship. The Mercy Academy Archery team also placed 29th out of 273 High Schools in the 2019 NASP Eastern Nationals, with the highest archer ranking 80th out of 2610 in the High School girls division.
