= Evangel Christian School (Kentucky) =

Location
- 5400 Minor Lane; Louisville, Kentucky 40219; United States
- Coordinates: 38.145048°N 85.700753°W

Information
- Other name: ECS
- Type: Private school
- Religious affiliation: Christian
- Oversight: Evangel World Prayer Center
- Superintendent: Joe Washington
- NCES School ID: 00517061
- Teaching staff: 15.0 (on an FTE basis)
- Grades: K–12
- Gender: Co-educational
- Enrollment: 134 (2017-2018)
- Student to teacher ratio: 8.9
- Website: www.evangelchristianschool.com

Evangel Christian School (ECS) is a K–12 private, Christian, co-educational school in Louisville, Kentucky, United States. It is part of the Evangel World Prayer Center.

It has a range of extracurricular activities such as athletics, academic clubs and missions trips.
