= Holy Angels Academy (Louisville, Kentucky) =

Coordinates: 38°15′15.2″N 85°31′43.2″W

Location
- 12201 Old Henry Road; Middletown, Kentucky; United States

Information
- Funding type: Private school
- Religious affiliation: Catholicism
- Established: 1973; 53 years ago
- Headmaster: Michael Swearingen
- Grades: pre-school - 12
- Gender: Mixed
- Website: www.holyangelslouisville.com

Holy Angels Academy is a private, co-educational, Roman Catholic grade school and high school in Louisville, Kentucky within the Archdiocese of Louisville. Holy Angels Academy is located at 12201 Old Henry Road, Middletown, KY.

== Background ==
Founded in 1973 in Louisville, Kentucky, Holy Angels Academy was established to provide a Christ-centered education in the full range of academic subjects and the doctrine and practice of the Catholic faith. In 1995 a college prep high school program in the classical tradition was added.

Holy Angels is a private, independent co-ed Catholic school with pre-school through grade twelve. It is recognized by the Archdiocese of Louisville and accepts the jurisdiction of the local bishop in matters relevant to instruction in Catholic doctrines and beliefs. The Academy is organized as a non-profit 501 c (3) corporation in the Commonwealth of Kentucky. Holy Angels is fully accredited with the National Association of Private Catholic and Independent Schools (NAPCIS) and abides by any regulations required by the State of Kentucky or the United States Government regarding the Academy's legal status.

In the early seventies a small group of lay faithful requested the help of a Dominican nun to establish what became Holy Angels Academy. Sister Mary Elise Groves was a founder and the first principal of Holy Angels.

Headmaster: Mr. Michael Swearingen

Dean of Students: Erik Huff

Grade Span: Pre-school - 12th Grade
