= Whitefield Academy (Kentucky) =

- Louisville, Kentucky

Information
- Faculty: Approx. 50
- Enrollment: 748 (pre-school - 12th grade)
- Average class size: 14
- Student to teacher ratio: 16:1
- Colors: Blue █ Gold █
- Mascot: Wildcats
- Website: whitefield.org

Whitefield Academy is a private Christian school in the Highview area of Louisville, Kentucky that was founded in 1976 as Highview Baptist Christian School, and originally taught students grades K-8. In 1983 a high school was added and the name changed to simply Highview Baptist School. In 2003, Highview Baptist School changed the school's name to Whitefield Academy, named after the English evangelist George Whitefield. Today students range from grades pre-school to 12th, and the total enrollment from pre-school to high school is approximately 800 students.

The school is a member of the Association of Christian Schools International (ACSI) and the Southern Association of Colleges and Schools.

In January 2020, the school gained national attention when it allegedly expelled a 15-year-old student because of a picture posted on social media, in which student was wearing a rainbow sweater and posing with a rainbow-colored birthday cake. The school claimed the picture is the latest in two years' worth of "lifestyle violations" by the student and also said the picture "demonstrates a posture of morality and cultural acceptance contrary to that of Whitefield Academy's beliefs." (Note: The rainbow flag often is used as a symbol of lesbian, gay, bisexual, transgender and queer pride and support for LGBTQ rights.) Whitefield Academy defended its position to expel students who may go against its religious beliefs because of exemptions for faith-based schools in Louisville's Fairness Ordinance.
