= Sullivan University =

For-profit university in Louisville, Kentucky, US

Coordinates: 38°12′46.5″N 85°40′13.9″W

- Motto: Kentucky's Career University
- Type: Private for-profit university
- Established: 1962
- Chancellor: Glenn Sullivan
- President: Tim Swenson
- Provost: Kimberly Daugherty
- Faculty: 212
- Students: 2,498
- Undergraduates: 2,085
- Location: Louisville, Kentucky, United States
- Campus: Louisville, Lexington, Fort Knox, Sullivan University Online
- Website: sullivan.edu

Sullivan University is a private for-profit university based in Louisville, Kentucky. It is licensed to offer certificates and diplomas, associate's, bachelor's, master's and doctoral degrees by the Kentucky Council on Postsecondary Education and is accredited by the Southern Association of Colleges and Schools Commission on Colleges. According to the Kentucky Council, for the 2015–2016 academic year, 40% of Sullivan's full-time, first-time associate degree students received their degrees within three years.

Sullivan University currently has physical campuses in Louisville, Lexington, Fort Knox, and a learning center in Louisa, Kentucky. Most of the university's degree programs are also available online or in a hybrid format.

== History ==
Sullivan Business College was founded in 1962 by A.O. Sullivan and his son, A.R. Sullivan, as a one-year school preparing people for careers. In 1972, the school began to offer associate degrees in addition to its one-year career diplomas. The institution was renamed in 1976 to Sullivan Junior College of Business to reflect its authority to grant associate degrees, and moved to its present Louisville campus on Bardstown Road and the Watterson Expressway. The school soon expanded by opening additional campuses—its Ft. Knox campus was opened in 1982, and its campus in Lexington (currently on Harrodsburg Road) in 1985. In 1987 Sullivan opened the National Center for Hospitality Studies offering degrees in culinary arts, baking and pastry arts, hotel and restaurant management and catering.

In 1990, the school was approved by the Kentucky Council on Higher Education to award the Bachelor of Science Degree in Business Administration. In addition, the baccalaureate degree program was added, receiving its accreditation in 1992. The college first offered an MBA degree in 1997.

In 1998, Sullivan College became the largest private college in Kentucky with 3,000 students enrolling at its campuses in Louisville, Lexington, and Fort Knox. The name was changed to its present designation, Sullivan University, in 2000, reflecting the college's growth.

In 2008, Sullivan began its first doctoral program, the Doctor of Pharmacy, which is accredited by the Accreditation Council for Pharmacy Education (ACPE). Pharmacy graduates are eligible to sit for the National Board Exam.

In 2010, Sullivan launched its first Doctor of Philosophy (Ph.D.) program in management. Sullivan University still reflects its original philosophy of quickly preparing students for careers by offering a "stair step" approach. A student can attain a career diploma in one year, an associate degree in eighteen months (although only a minority of full-time students reach this far), a bachelor's degree after an additional eighteen months, and a master's degree in an additional eighteen months. This way, they can attain employment at an entry level while working toward a degree.

Sullivan University operates on the quarter system with each period lasting eleven weeks. The Louisville and Lexington campuses offer "Plus Friday," where campuses do not hold classes on any Fridays but do have the campus offices open so students can work with full-time undergraduate instructors, who are required to be on campus on Friday morning.

In 2012, Sullivan University entered into an agreement with Historic Homes Foundation, Inc., the owner of the adjoining Historic Farmington Plantation, to lease five of the landmark's 18 acres for use as a 300-space parking lot to be shared by the entities. Controversial questions about the proposal were raised in online media leading up to its consideration in the February 3, 2013, meeting of the Metro Louisville Landmarks Commission's Individual Landmarks Architectural Review Committee.

Sullivan University merged with Spencerian College and Sullivan College of Technology and Design, creating a single university in 2018.

The university's founder, A.R. Sullivan, retired as chancellor in 2020 and was named chancellor emeritus. He still serves on the board of directors. Glenn Sullivan was subsequently named chancellor of the university.

=== Legal issues ===
In a 2009 lawsuit, it was disclosed that the organization held just $20 million in cash reserves though the Sullivan University System distributed $77 million over the previous 10 years to its two sole stockholders, Chancellor Alva Sullivan and ex-wife Patricia Schrenk. These distributions excluded salaries, bonuses, and other benefits received from employment with the organization. In her filing, Schrenk alleged that college funds were used to pay for personal vacations, to settle sexual harassment lawsuits, and for private lawn care at the stockholders' residences. Though the lawsuit was not lodged against the Sullivan University System, its relatively low cash reserves despite the large distributions made to its stockholders made local and regional news.

In August 2011, a special prosecutor was appointed to investigate potential violations of state campaign-finance laws when a former employee alleged that the Sullivan University System Chancellor and other executives asked more than 100 employees to pledge to vote for and donate to Todd P'Pool, a then-candidate for Kentucky Attorney General. P'Pool was running against incumbent Jack Conway, who had been investigating the Sullivan University System in several matters since earlier that same year. The allegation stated that executives urged employees to demonstrate their support for the candidate in front of all present at a meeting and to donate to the campaign by presenting a personal check to Sullivan University System executives.

In 2011, the Sullivan University System was ordered to pay more than $480,000 to then-current and previous employees for a violation of the Fair Labor Standards Act. The suit alleged that the system misclassified admissions representatives and failed to accurately track work hours in order to avoid payment of overtime wages. Though alerted to the situation in 1994, the U.S. Department of Labor did not review the case until 2007, and did not file the lawsuit against both the Sullivan University System and its Chancellor until 2010.

== Culinary programs ==
The school's culinary programs are one of its distinctive features. Both faculty and students have been featured on the Food Network; Former Louisville instructor John Castro bested Bobby Flay in Hot Browns in a 2008 Throwdown, while Lexington graduate Brigitte Nguyen came in a close second in a hamburger-themed Ultimate Recipe Showdown shown in 2009. Brigitte won the $50,000 first prize in the National Chicken Cooking Contest in San Antonio May 2, 2009, with her "Chinese Chicken Burgers with Rainbow Sesame Slaw."

The American Culinary Federation, Inc. (ACF) has named Chef Derek Spendlove first chair of the ACF Certification Commission. Spendlove currently serves as Director of the Baking and Pastry Arts Program for the National Center for Hospitality Studies (NCHS) at Sullivan University. He also serves as team manager of Sullivan University's award-winning student culinary competition team.

In 2008, Sullivan University was selected as the only culinary program in the United States to have been formally invited to cook for the Olympic athletes and sponsors for the 2008 Olympics in Beijing.

In 2021, Jackie Joseph, a Sullivan University graduate, was crowned "Best Baker in America" on the Food Network.
