= Saint Francis High School (Louisville) =

High school in Louisville, Kentucky

Coordinates: 38°14′46.8″N 85°45′22.6″W

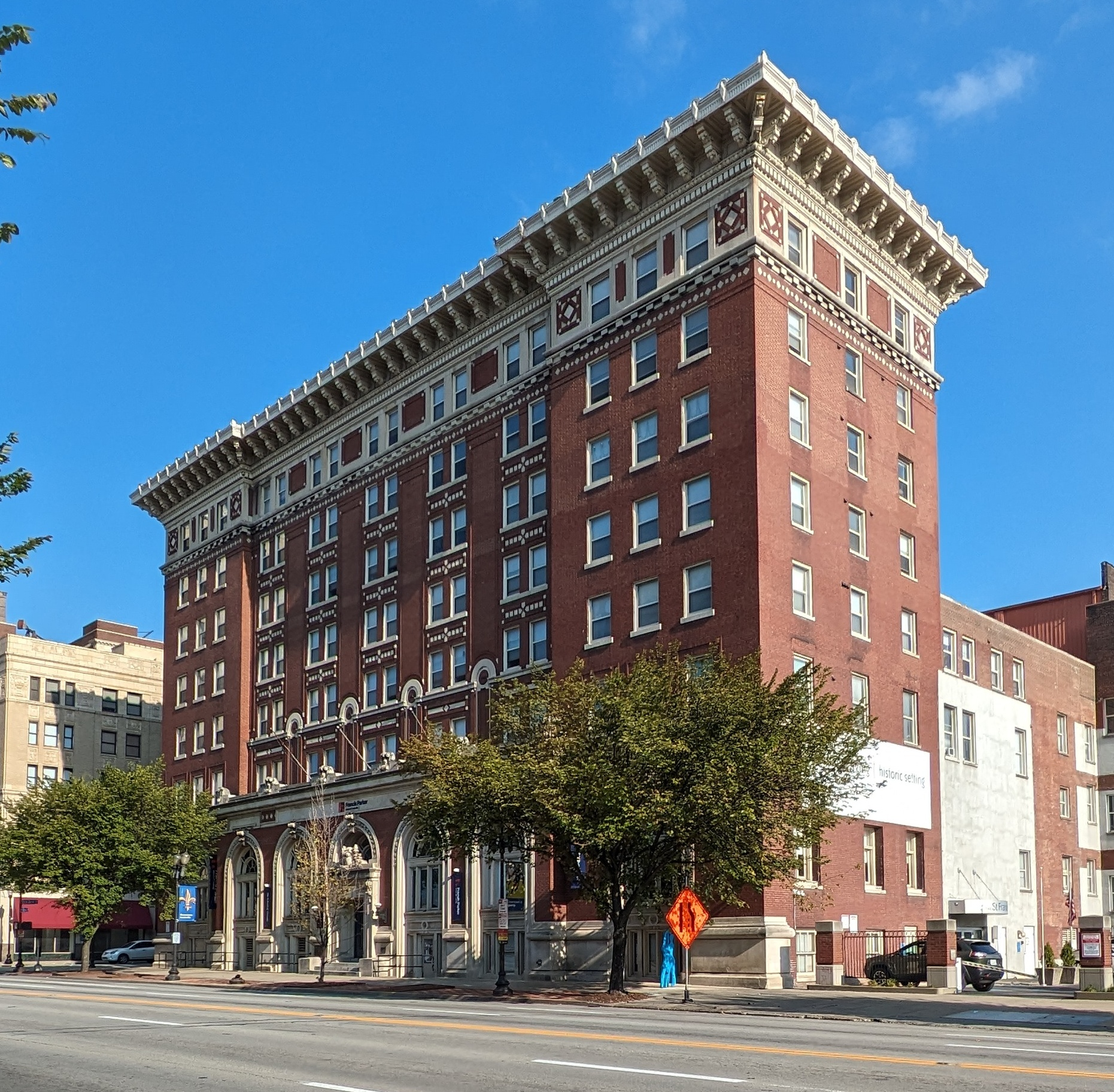
Francis Parker School of Louisville

Francis Parker School of Louisville, originally known as St. Francis School, is a private, coeducational, college-preparatory day school in downtown Louisville, Kentucky, USA. Founded in 1977, it is an outgrowth of St. Francis School, in Goshen, a K-8 school founded on the developmental education model a decade earlier. Both schools are non-sectarian, but maintain an association with the Episcopal Diocese of Louisville, and a historical link to St. Francis in the Fields Episcopal Church in Louisville. The church and the schools are named after St. Francis of Assisi.

== History ==
Francis Parker High School was founded in downtown Louisville, Kentucky, in 1976, by Tom Pike, a group of parents and board members. Pike, who would be headmaster until he retired, had been Acting Head of School at Francis Parker in Goshen. Francis Parker at that time included kindergarten through ninth grade; with this change, it became K–8, and the rising 9th grade migrated to the new high school. The founders chose a site downtown in order to give their adolescent students easy access to cultural institutions and resources such as the main branch of the Louisville Free Public Library and close proximity to the adult world they would soon be joining. Francis Parker opened in September 1977 with 60 students and 14 teachers and staff. The school was housed in the historic former Downtown YMCA building at 233 W. Broadway, a 1913 structure in the Beaux Arts style listed in the National Register of Historic Places. Originally occupying the building's third floor, the school shared athletic facilities with the Downtown Athletic Club, including the former YMCA's pool, squash court, and indoor track, and basement theater. By 1981, the school had grown to 123 students and 18 teachers, and no longer fit on the third floor. When Holly Wiedemann, a Lexington-based developer who focused on adaptive reuse of historic structures, renovated the building as a mixed-facility incorporating residential, retail, and office space, the school moved the main lobby and offices to the basement level in order to expand classroom space on the 3rd floor.

As the school approached its 25th year, Pike, who had been serving as head of school since its founding, and the school's directors sought to expand and revitalize Francis Parker High School. Following a $6 million fundraising campaign, Francis Parker High School and a private partner undertook a major redesign and renovation of the entire building, with the school occupying the northern half and apartments and commercial spaces the southern half. Undertaken by Potter & Associates Architects and completed in 2003, the award-winning renovation spread school operations from the ground through third floors.

Pike retired after the 2002–03 school year. Alexandra Schreiber Thurstone ('84) is the current head of school.

In 2012, Francis Parker high School merged with sister school, St.Francis School, to form the current Preschool-12th grade Francis Parker School. Although the merger had been discussed over the past several decades, the boards of both sister schools agreed the schools were ready to consolidate all three campuses, which share similar educational philosophies, into the Francis Parker School: "the regional center of progressive learning where students grow into mindful, informed young adults."

Thurstone remained head of school after the merger. In 2016, she led a new expansion of the school that would expand its footprint in the building by 50%. The expansion would also move the school's entrance from 3rd Street back to the building's main entrance, where it had been when the school first opened its doors in 1977.

== Educational philosophy and program ==
By design, the school has had one of the smallest 9-12 student enrollments in the country, typically no more than 145 students. The founders of the school wanted to maintain the low student-to-teacher ratio of the lower school and facilitate a more collegial atmosphere between teachers and students. Accordingly, the new facilities are designed for a maximum student body of 180.

Within its developmental learning background, St. Francis has few rules, no dress code, and a lack of formality. The school does not track its students by ability, believing all learners can benefit from interacting with each other as well as with the teacher. Nevertheless, the curriculum is academically rigorous, with emphasis on written and spoken expression in all classes. College Board Advanced Placement courses are available in many subjects in the upper grades.

With a student teacher ratio of 8:1, maximum class size of 18 and an average size in 2006-2007 of 11. The mission is to prepare students academically and personally for college and life in a rigorous educational environment that challenges them to think independently, respect individuality, and act with integrity.

Students taking AP tests score 3 or higher over 80% of the time and gain college credit and/or advanced placement in college courses. They do not publish their standardized test scores. Currently the school offers over 14 AP classes.

== Extracurricular activities ==
The school colors are red and blue. The mascot of the school is a red Wyvern rampant.

Athletic teams include soccer, field hockey, volleyball, basketball, tennis, track, Bowling, and Cross country

Academic teams include Quick Recall (a quiz bowl competition), chess, Science Olympiad, Math League and Destination ImagiNation.

== Associations ==
The school is an accredited member of the National Association of Independent Schools (NAIS) and the Independent Schools Association of the Central States (ISACS), and belongs to the Kentucky Association of Independent Schools (KAIS) and the Louisville Independent Schools Coalition (LISC).
