= DeSales High School (Louisville, Kentucky) =

Location
- 425 Kenwood Drive; Louisville, Kentucky 40214; United States; 38.16230°N 85.77440°W

Information
- Type: Private, college-preparatory school
- Motto: Faith, Brotherhood, Tradition
- Religious affiliation: Roman Catholic
- Patron saint: Francis de Sales
- Established: 1956
- Oversight: Roman Catholic Archdiocese of Louisville
- NCES School ID: 00514311
- President: Rick C. Blackwell
- Teaching staff: 23.0 (on an FTE basis)
- Grades: 9–12
- Gender: Boys
- Enrollment: 326 (2016-2017)
- Student to teacher ratio: 11
- Colors: Brown, Orange, White
- Nickname: Colts
- Website: www.desaleshighschool.com

DeSales High School, is a private, Roman Catholic, college-preparatory school for boys in Louisville, Kentucky, United States. It was established in 1956 and is located in the Roman Catholic Archdiocese of Louisville.
