= Holy Cross High School (Louisville) =

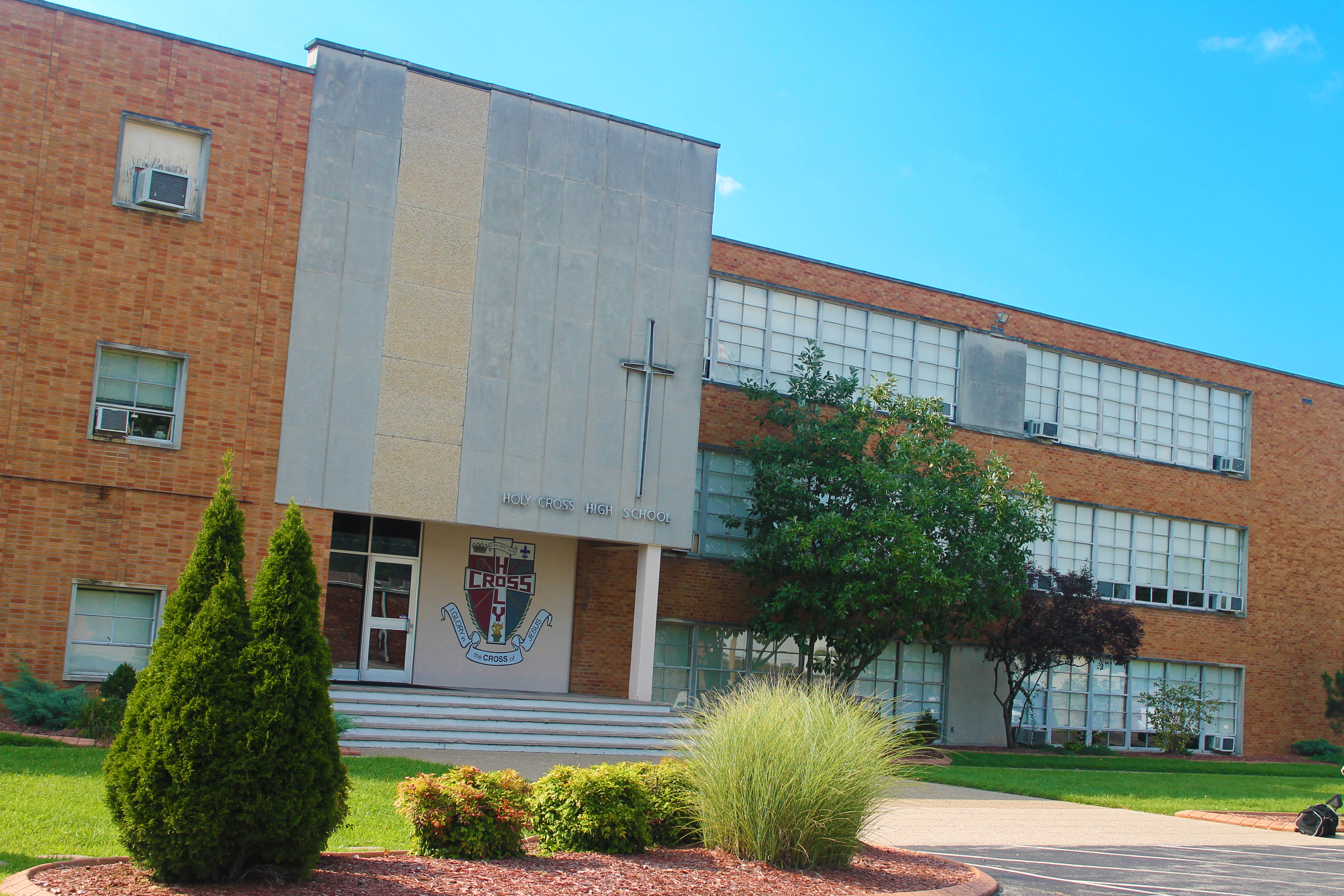
- Front of school

Location
- 5144 Dixie Highway; Louisville, Kentucky 40216; United States; 38°9′57″N 85°49′48″W

Information
- Type: Private, college-preparatory school
- Motto: Real Life, Real Learning, Real People
- Religious affiliation: Roman Catholic
- Established: 1984; 42 years ago
- Status: Open
- Oversight: Archdiocese of Louisville
- Superintendent: Leisa Schulz
- President: Danielle Wiegandt
- Principal: Shelly Pence
- Chaplain: Fr. Stephen Reeves
- Faculty: 30
- Grades: 9–12
- Gender: Coed
- Enrollment: 262 (2015-16)
- Campus: Suburban
- Campus size: 23 acres (93,000 m^{2})
- Colors: Maroon; Gray; White
- Slogan: Real Life, Real Learning, Real People
- Athletics conference: Kentucky High School Athletic Association
- Nickname: Cougars
- Preceded by: Bishop David & Angela Merici
- Website: www.holycrosshs.com

Holy Cross High School is a private, college preparatory, coeducational Catholic high school located in Louisville, Kentucky. It is the result of the merger between the former all-boys Bishop David High School and all-girls Angela Merici High School. The combined school was founded in 1984, and the first class of Holy Cross graduated in 1985.

Holy Cross is the only coeducational Catholic high school located within Louisville city limits and one of two in the Archdiocese of Louisville system.

== Notable alumni ==
- Ethan Driskell (2019) – NFL offensive tackle for the Kansas City Chiefs
- Ben Rhodes (2015) – NASCAR driver
