= Assumption High School (Kentucky) =

Catholic all-girls school in Louisville, Kentucky, US

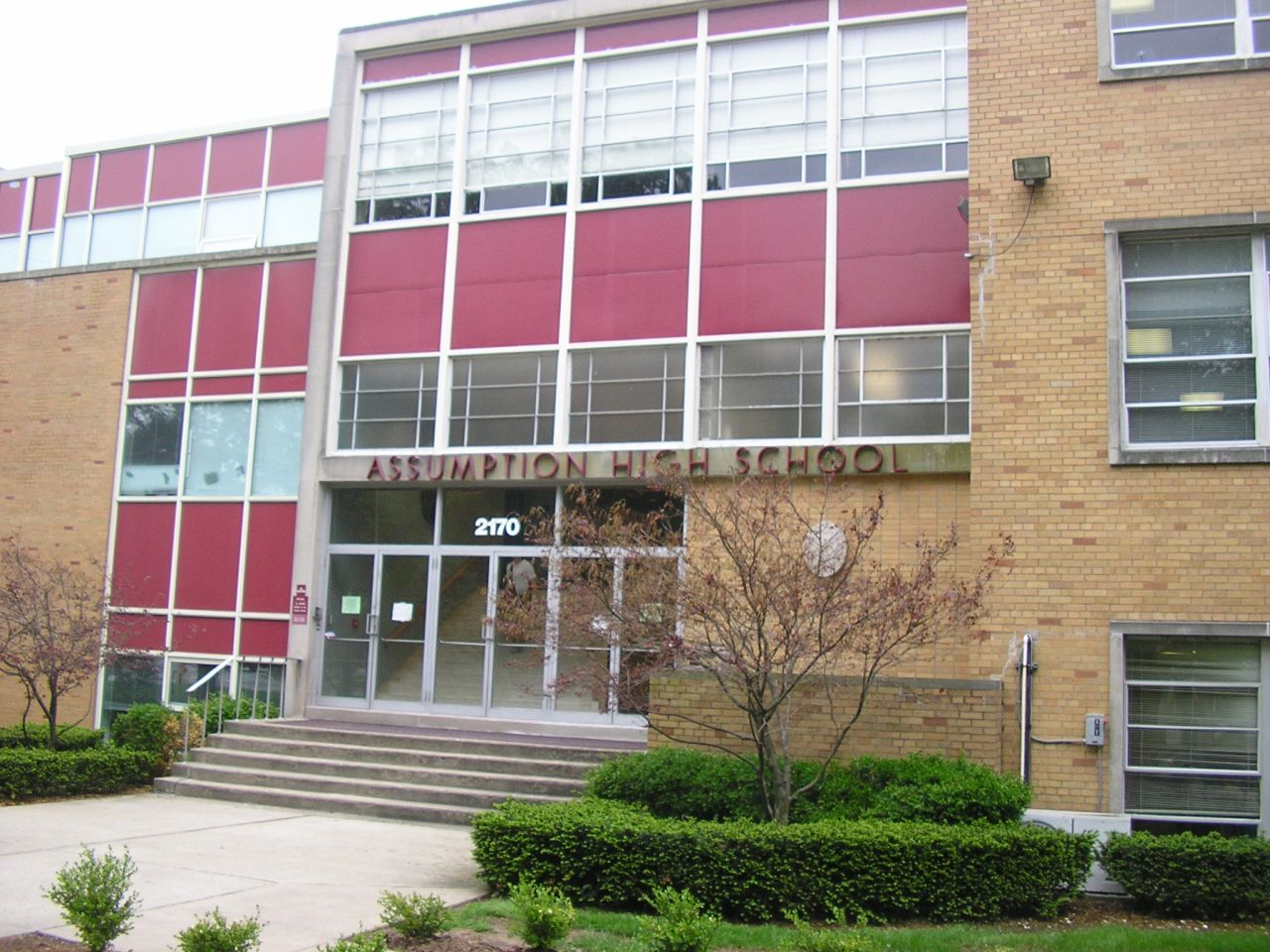
- Main entrance to Assumption

Location
- 2170 Tyler Lane; Louisville, (Jefferson County), Kentucky 40205; United States; 38°13′1″N 85°40′40″W

Information
- Type: Private, All-Girls
- Religious affiliation: Roman Catholic
- Established: 1955
- School district: Sisters of Mercy
- President: Mary Lang
- Principal: Martha Tedesco
- Faculty: 82.9 (on an FTE basis)
- Grades: 9–12
- Enrollment: 877 (2017–18)
- Average class size: 18
- Student to teacher ratio: 10.6
- Colors: Rose and White
- Nickname: Rockets
- Accreditation: Southern Association of Colleges and Schools
- Website: https://www.ahsrockets.org/

Assumption High School is a Catholic all-girls high school located in Louisville, Kentucky, sponsored by the Sisters of Mercy.

== History ==
The history of Assumption High School began in 1951 when the Most Reverend John A. Floersh, Archbishop of Louisville, asked the Sisters of Mercy to establish a new high school at the corner of Bardstown Road and Tyler Lane. The school first opened on September 6, 1955. In that first year, tuition was $100 and the student body consisted of 103 freshmen and 50 sophomores.

The first principal was Sr. Mary Prisca Pfeffer, and the faculty consisted of five Sisters of Mercy. Another sister served as the cook and was the only staff member. For three years, the sisters lived on the third floor of the school until there were finally enough funds to build a separate convent. Their current Principal, Martha Tedesco, graduated from Assumption in 1990.

== Academics ==
Assumption offers a college preparatory curriculum, with courses at the Academic, Honors, Honors I, Advanced, Dual credit, and Advanced Placement (AP) levels. AP courses are available for freshmen, sophomores, juniors, and seniors. Assumption offers 26 AP classes. Assumption also offers 16 dual credit college courses through the University of Louisville, Western Kentucky University, and Jefferson Community and Technical College.

== Achievements ==
Assumption is accredited by the Southern Association of Colleges and Schools and the Kentucky Department of Education.

Assumption was the first school to receive the Beacon of Hope Award, Making a Difference Award from the Learning Disabilities Association of Kentucky.

The high school has been named a U.S. Department of Education Blue Ribbon School of Excellence on three separate occasions. Assumption is one of only 41 high schools in the nation and the only all-girls high school in Louisville to receive this award three times. In 2005, Assumption was one of 30 schools nationwide and the only high school in Kentucky to receive the Blue Ribbon Lighthouse high School Award. In 2021, Assumption was named a Cognia International School of Distinction.

== Athletics ==
Assumption offers sports sanctioned by the Kentucky High School Athletic Association (KHSAA.)

Assumption has been awarded national titles in dance and volleyball, and has many times taken runner-up in track, volleyball, and field hockey. The dance team has won three national titles: 1999, 2003, and 2005. The volleyball team has won seven national championships, including in 1996, 2000, 2001, and 2005. They have also won 26 state titles in the past 35 years, winning eight in a row from 1995 to 2002, with the most recent in 2026. The volleyball team at Assumption currently ranks #1 in the country according to USA Today. The Field Hockey team has won the KHSAA State Championship 5 times, with the most recent being in 2024.

The cross country team won the state championship in 2007, 2008, and 2010, 2011, 2012, 2013, 2021, 2023, 2024, and 2025. Field hockey won the state championship in 2009, 2014, 2016, 2019, 2022, & 2024. Softball team won the state championship in 2025.

== Notable alumnae ==
- Katie George, sports reporter and beauty pageant titleholder
- Maggie Lawson, actress
