= National Register of Historic Places listings in Oldham County, Kentucky =

Location of Oldham County in Kentucky

This is a list of the National Register of Historic Places listings in Oldham County, Kentucky.

This is intended to be a complete list of the properties and districts on the National Register of Historic Places in Oldham County, Kentucky, United States. The locations of National Register properties and districts for which the latitude and longitude coordinates are included below, may be seen in an online map.

There are 48 properties and districts listed on the National Register in the county.

This National Park Service list is complete through NPS recent listings posted April 24, 2026.

== Current listings ==
| | Name on the Register | Image | Date listed | Location | City or town | Description |
|---|---|---|---|---|---|---|
| 1 | Ashbourne Farms | Ashbourne Farms | March 25, 2008 (#08000212) | 3800 Old Westport Rd. 38°27′03″N 85°25′22″W | La Grange | |
| 2 | Ashwood Avenue Historic District | | August 7, 1989 (#89000951) | Roughly Ash Ave. from La Grange Rd. to Elm Ave. 38°18′26″N 85°29′19″W | Pewee Valley | |
| 3 | John Leslie Bate House | | January 8, 1987 (#87000144) | East of Buckeye Ln. off Kentucky Route 42; 38°25′44″N 85°33′46″W | Goshen | |
| 4 | Bondurant-Hustin House | | November 27, 1989 (#89001989) | 104 Castlewood Dr. 38°18′21″N 85°29′45″W | Pewee Valley | |
| 5 | Bradshaw-Duncan House | | July 14, 2005 (#05000254) | 8502 Todds Point Rd. 38°18′12″N 85°26′03″W | Crestwood | |
| 6 | Building at 301 La Grange Road | | November 27, 1989 (#89001980) | 301 La Grange Rd. 38°18′38″N 85°29′14″W | Pewee Valley | |
| 7 | Carpenter-Smith House | | February 25, 1982 (#82002739) | Covered Bridge Rd. 38°22′08″N 85°31′46″W | Crestwood | |
| 8 | Central Avenue Historic District | | August 7, 1989 (#89000950) | Roughly Central Ave. from Peace Ln. to Mt. Mercy Dr. 38°18′40″N 85°29′35″W | Pewee Valley | |
| 9 | Central La Grange Historic District | Central La Grange Historic District | September 8, 1988 (#88001316) | Primarily along Washington, Main, and Jefferson Sts., Kentucky Ave., and 1st through 6th Aves. 38°24′25″N 85°22′54″W | La Grange | |
| 10 | Clifton | | August 18, 1997 (#97000874) | 4801 Greenhaven Ln. 38°27′50″N 85°28′55″W | Goshen | |
| 11 | Albert E. Clore House | | May 26, 1983 (#83002842) | 6400 Clore Lane; 38°19′58″N 85°30′04″W | Crestwood | |
| 12 | Confederate Memorial in Pewee Valley | Confederate Memorial in Pewee Valley | July 17, 1997 (#97000673) | Confederate Cemetery, junction of Maple Ave. and Old Floydsburg Rd. 38°18′11″N 85°28′32″W | Pewee Valley | |
| 13 | Joseph H. Ellis House | | November 27, 1989 (#89001988) | 320 Maple Ave. 38°18′20″N 85°28′46″W | Pewee Valley | |
| 14 | Forrester-Duvall House | | November 27, 1989 (#89001987) | 115 Old Forest Rd. 38°18′12″N 85°29′12″W | Pewee Valley | |
| 15 | D. W. Griffith House | D. W. Griffith House | June 3, 1976 (#76000935) | 206 N. 4th St. 38°24′30″N 85°23′02″W | La Grange | |
| 16 | Harrods Creek Baptist Church and Rev. William Kellar House | Harrods Creek Baptist Church and Rev. William Kellar House | September 8, 1976 (#76000934) | Northwest of Crestwood on Old Brownsboro Rd. 38°21′32″N 85°30′39″W | Crestwood | Old stone church |
| 17 | The Hermitage | | December 2, 1982 (#82001572) | Off U.S. Route 42; 38°24′51″N 85°32′38″W | Goshen | |
| 18 | William Ingram House | | August 18, 1983 (#83002843) | 6800 Shrader Lane; 38°24′11″N 85°29′47″W | Buckner | |
| 19 | Johnson's Landing House and Farm | | August 4, 2016 (#16000505) | 2300 Rose Island Rd. 38°25′33″N 85°35′44″W | Goshen | |
| 20 | Abraham Kellar House | | July 9, 1979 (#79001029) | West of Brownsboro off Kentucky Route 329; 38°21′36″N 85°31′26″W | Brownsboro | |
| 21 | Locke-Mount House | | November 24, 1982 (#82001573) | South of Goshen off U.S. Route 42; 38°21′59″N 85°35′02″W | Goshen | |
| 22 | The Locust | | July 30, 1975 (#75000817) | LaGrange Rd. off Kentucky Route 146; 38°19′12″N 85°29′13″W | Pewee Valley | |
| 23 | McMahan House | McMahan House | May 13, 1982 (#82002741) | 203 Washington St. 38°24′25″N 85°22′37″W | La Grange | |
| 24 | William McMakin House | | January 8, 1987 (#87000211) | Off Kentucky Route 1817; 38°22′11″N 85°27′55″W | Brownsboro | |
| 25 | George Miller House | | November 27, 1989 (#89001986) | 331 Central Ave. 38°19′05″N 85°29′41″W | Pewee Valley | |
| 26 | Dr. Thomas C. Peebles House | | November 27, 1989 (#89001985) | 114 Maple Ave. 38°18′35″N 85°28′58″W | Pewee Valley | |
| 27 | Pewee Valley Confederate Cemetery | Pewee Valley Confederate Cemetery | November 27, 1989 (#89001984) | Maple Ave., southeast of its junction with Old Floydsburg Rd. 38°18′12″N 85°28′34″W | Pewee Valley | |
| 28 | John Ritter House | | January 8, 1987 (#87000159) | Old Floydsburg Rd. off Kentucky Route 1408; 38°18′39″N 85°27′34″W | Floydsburg | |
| 29 | Ross-Hollenbach Farm | | July 8, 2008 (#08000651) | 4701 S. Highway 1694 (Sleepy Hollow Rd.); 38°21′20″N 85°32′47″W | Brownsboro | |
| 30 | Russell Court | Russell Court | November 10, 1988 (#88002612) | Roughly bounded by Madison St., Chestnut St., E. Jefferson St., and Maple St. 38°24′42″N 85°22′19″W | La Grange | |
| 31 | St. Aloysius Church | St. Aloysius Church | November 27, 1989 (#89001983) | 202 Mt. Mercy Dr. 38°18′29″N 85°29′30″W | Pewee Valley | |
| 32 | Saint James' Episcopal Church | Saint James' Episcopal Church | December 5, 1985 (#85003072) | 401 Old LaGrange Rd. 38°18′47″N 85°29′04″W | Pewee Valley | |
| 33 | Reuben Sale House | | November 24, 1982 (#82001574) | 3700 Smith Lane; 38°28′04″N 85°25′30″W | La Grange | |
| 34 | William Alexander Smith House | | November 27, 1989 (#89001982) | 108 Mt. Mercy Dr. 38°18′21″N 85°29′39″W | Pewee Valley | |
| 35 | Spring Hill | | April 2, 1980 (#80001664) | South of Ballardsville off Kentucky Route 53; 38°19′56″N 85°20′01″W | Ballardsville | |
| 36 | Tanglewood | | November 27, 1989 (#89001981) | 417 La Grange Rd. 38°18′52″N 85°29′02″W | Pewee Valley | |
| 37 | Phillip R. Taylor House | | May 24, 1983 (#83002844) | Shuler Lane; 38°20′18″N 85°34′06″W | Louisville | |
| 38 | Tuliphurst | | November 27, 1989 (#89001979) | 115 La Grange Rd. 38°18′18″N 85°29′27″W | Pewee Valley | |
| 39 | Van Horn-Ross House | | November 27, 1989 (#89001978) | 138 Rosswoods Dr. 38°18′50″N 85°29′40″W | Pewee Valley | |
| 40 | Waldeck Farm | | January 4, 2001 (#00001618) | 5900 W. Kentucky Route 22; 38°19′41″N 85°27′30″W | Crestwood | |
| 41 | Wesley Methodist Church | | January 8, 1987 (#87000179) | Haunz Ln. 38°19′54″N 85°32′07″W | Anchorage | |
| 42 | Wildwood Farm | | March 30, 2006 (#06000214) | 3901 Axton Ln. 38°26′55″N 85°32′10″W | Skylight | |
| 43 | Woodland | | August 8, 2016 (#16000506) | 3008 Ann Trese Cove; 38°21′42″N 85°20′42″W | Crestwood | |
| 44 | Wooldridge-Rose House | | September 13, 2006 (#06000810) | 315 Wooldridge Ave. 38°19′03″N 85°29′24″W | Pewee Valley | |
| 45 | William Woolfolk House | | January 8, 1987 (#87000202) | Off U.S. Route 42; 38°26′17″N 85°27′23″W | La Grange | |
| 46 | Yager House | | June 17, 1982 (#82002740) | Southeast of Goshen on Covered Bridge Rd. 38°22′44″N 85°32′07″W | Goshen | |
| 47 | Yew Dell Farm | | August 19, 2011 (#11000540) | 5800 N. Camden Ln. 38°20′21″N 85°27′47″W | Crestwood | |
| 48 | Yewell-Snyder House | | November 3, 1983 (#83003802) | 6206 N. Hitt Lane; 38°20′32″N 85°32′46″W | Brownsboro | |

== See also ==
- List of National Historic Landmarks in Kentucky
- National Register of Historic Places listings in Kentucky
- List of attractions and events in the Louisville metropolitan area
