= Confederate Memorial Park =

Confederate Memorial Park can mean:

- Confederate Memorial Park (Albany, Georgia)
- Confederate Memorial Park (Marbury, Alabama)
- Confederate Memorial Park (Tampa, Florida)
