= Bondurant =

Bondurant may refer to:

- Bondurant (surname)
- Bondurant, Iowa, United States
- Bondurant, Kentucky
- Bondurant, Wyoming, United States
- Bondurant House (disambiguation)
- The Bondurant Years
- Bob Bondurant School of High Performance Driving, a racing school
