= Yager House =

Yager House may refer to:

- Yager House (Anchorage, Kentucky), listed on the National Register of Historic Places in Jefferson County, Kentucky
- Yager House (Goshen, Kentucky), listed on the National Register of Historic Places in Oldham County, Kentucky
- John and Carrie Yager House, Mentor, Ohio, listed on the National Register of Historic Places in Lake County, Ohio
