= Carpenter-Smith House =

Historic house in Kentucky, United States

- U.S. National Register of Historic Places
- Location within Kentucky Location within the United States
- Location: Covered Bridge Road
- Nearest city: Crestwood, Kentucky
- Coordinates: 38°22′8″N 85°31′46″W
- Area: 0.5 acres (0.20 ha)
- Built: c.1839
- NRHP reference No.: 82002739
- Added to NRHP: February 25, 1982

Constructed around 1839, the Carpenter-Smith House is located on Covered Bridge Road near Crestwood in Oldham County, Kentucky, United States. It was added to the National Register of Historic Places on February 25, 1982. A photo of the house is included on page 16 of the April 2009 Brownsboro, Kentucky Area Master Plan.

It is somewhat unusual for having two separated front doors, in a window-door-window-door-window line-up of bays across the front of the house. It is about 1/4 mile off Hwy
