= River Bluff (disambiguation) =

A River Bluff or Riverbluff is a very steep and broad hill or small cliff, next to a river.

River Bluff or Riverbluff may also refer to:

- River Bluff, Kentucky, a city in Oldham County
- Riverbluff Cave, a paleontological site near Springfield, Missouri
- River Bluff High School, in Lexington, South Carolina
- River Bluff (Wintergreen, Virginia), a historic home

== See also ==
- Bluff River (disambiguation)
