= List of lakes of Jefferson County, Montana =

There are at least 22 named lakes and reservoirs in Jefferson County, Montana.

== Lakes ==
- Cliff Lake, 46°20′20″N 112°22′57″W, el. 7,031 feet (2,143 m)
- Cottonwood Lake, 46°19′41″N 112°28′50″W, el. 7,290 feet (2,220 m)
- Forest Lake, 46°27′06″N 112°10′00″W, el. 6,256 feet (1,907 m)
- Frog Pond, 46°17′01″N 112°21′03″W, el. 6,020 feet (1,830 m)
- Glenwood Lake, 46°17′56″N 111°53′23″W, el. 8,199 feet (2,499 m)
- Hidden Lake, 46°18′32″N 111°54′28″W, el. 8,192 feet (2,497 m)
- Homestake Lake, 45°55′11″N 112°24′25″W, el. 6,270 feet (1,910 m)
- Ice Pond, 46°09′41″N 112°22′35″W, el. 6,234 feet (1,900 m)
- Leslie Lake, 46°17′06″N 111°53′04″W, el. 8,127 feet (2,477 m)
- Quartz Lake, 46°25′13″N 112°10′11″W, el. 6,345 feet (1,934 m)
- South Fork Lakes, 46°16′49″N 111°49′37″W, el. 6,673 feet (2,034 m)
- Tizer Lakes, 46°18′42″N 111°53′22″W, el. 7,585 feet (2,312 m)

== Reservoirs ==
- B and B Fishpond, 46°04′20″N 112°25′05″W, el. 6,319 feet (1,926 m)
- Columbia Gardens Water Supply, 46°02′41″N 112°25′17″W, el. 6,398 feet (1,950 m)
- Delmoe Lake, 45°59′06″N 112°20′30″W, el. 6,099 feet (1,859 m)
- Keogh Reservoir, 46°04′35″N 112°07′28″W, el. 5,023 feet (1,531 m)
- Maney Lake, 46°09′13″N 112°27′47″W, el. 6,332 feet (1,930 m)
- Northern Pacific Reservoir, 46°33′13″N 111°54′21″W, el. 4,052 feet (1,235 m)
- Northern Pacific Reservoir, 46°33′06″N 111°54′03″W, el. 4,032 feet (1,229 m)
- Park Lake, 46°26′41″N 112°10′24″W, el. 6,371 feet (1,942 m)
- Taylor Reservoir, 46°12′56″N 112°07′07″W, el. 4,954 feet (1,510 m)
- Whitetail Reservoir, 46°04′22″N 112°15′43″W, el. 7,260 feet (2,210 m)

== See also ==
- List of lakes in Montana
