= Brownsboro, Kentucky =

Unincorporated community in Kentucky, United States

Brownsboro is a rural unincorporated community in Oldham County, Kentucky, United States. It is located northwest of Crestwood on KY 329.

== Geography ==
Brownsboro is located at 38°21′23.34″N 85°29′54.15″W.
