= Bondurant House =

Bondurant House may refer to:

- Bondurant House (Mount Sterling, Kentucky), listed on the National Register of Historic Places in Montgomery County, Kentucky
- Bondurant-Hustin House, Peewee Valley, Kentucky, listed on the National Register of Historic Places in Oldham County, Kentucky
