= Wesley Methodist Church (Kentucky) =

Historic church in Kentucky, United States

- U.S. National Register of Historic Places
- Location within Kentucky Location within the United States
- Nearest city: Crestwood, Kentucky
- Coordinates: 38°19′54″N 85°32′7″W
- Area: 13 acres (5.3 ha)
- Built: 1824
- Built by: Bobbitt, Silas; Jean, Bruce
- Architectural style: Federal
- MPS: Early Stone Buildings of Kentucky Outer Bluegrass and Pennyrile TR
- NRHP reference No.: 87000179
- Added to NRHP: January 8, 1987

The Wesley Methodist Church, located on Haunz Lane in Oldham County near the Jefferson County line in Kentucky, is a historic church which was listed on the National Register of Historic Places in 1987.

It was built in 1824 and, in its 1984 Kentucky historic resources site inventory, it was identified as the "only known unaltered early stone church" in Kentucky.

It is a one-room dry stone front-gable church, about 32 by 44 feet (9.8 m × 13.4 m) in plan, with three windows on each side.

It was built by Silas Bobbitt, age 20, and Bruce Jean, age 18.
