= Central Avenue Historic District (Pewee Valley, Kentucky) =

Historic district in Kentucky, United States

- U.S. National Register of Historic Places
- U.S. Historic district
- Location: Roughly Central Ave. from Peace Ln. to Mt. Mercy Dr., Pewee Valley, Kentucky
- Area: 40 acres (16 ha)
- Built: 1851
- Architect: Osborne, Charles Marcus
- Architectural style: Italianate, Late 19th And 20th Century Revivals
- MPS: Peewee Valley MPS
- NRHP reference No.: 89000950
- Added to NRHP: August 7, 1989

The Central Avenue Historic District is a historic district in Pewee Valley, Kentucky, United States. Covering an area of 40 acres (16 ha), it was listed on the National Register of Historic Places in 1989. It included 21 contributing buildings, two contributing structures, and a contributing site.

The district runs along Central Ave. from Peace Ln. to Mt. Mercy Dr. and covers 17 residences and businesses with their outbuildings.
