= Saint James' Episcopal Church (Pewee Valley, Kentucky) =

Historic church in Kentucky, United States

- U.S. National Register of Historic Places
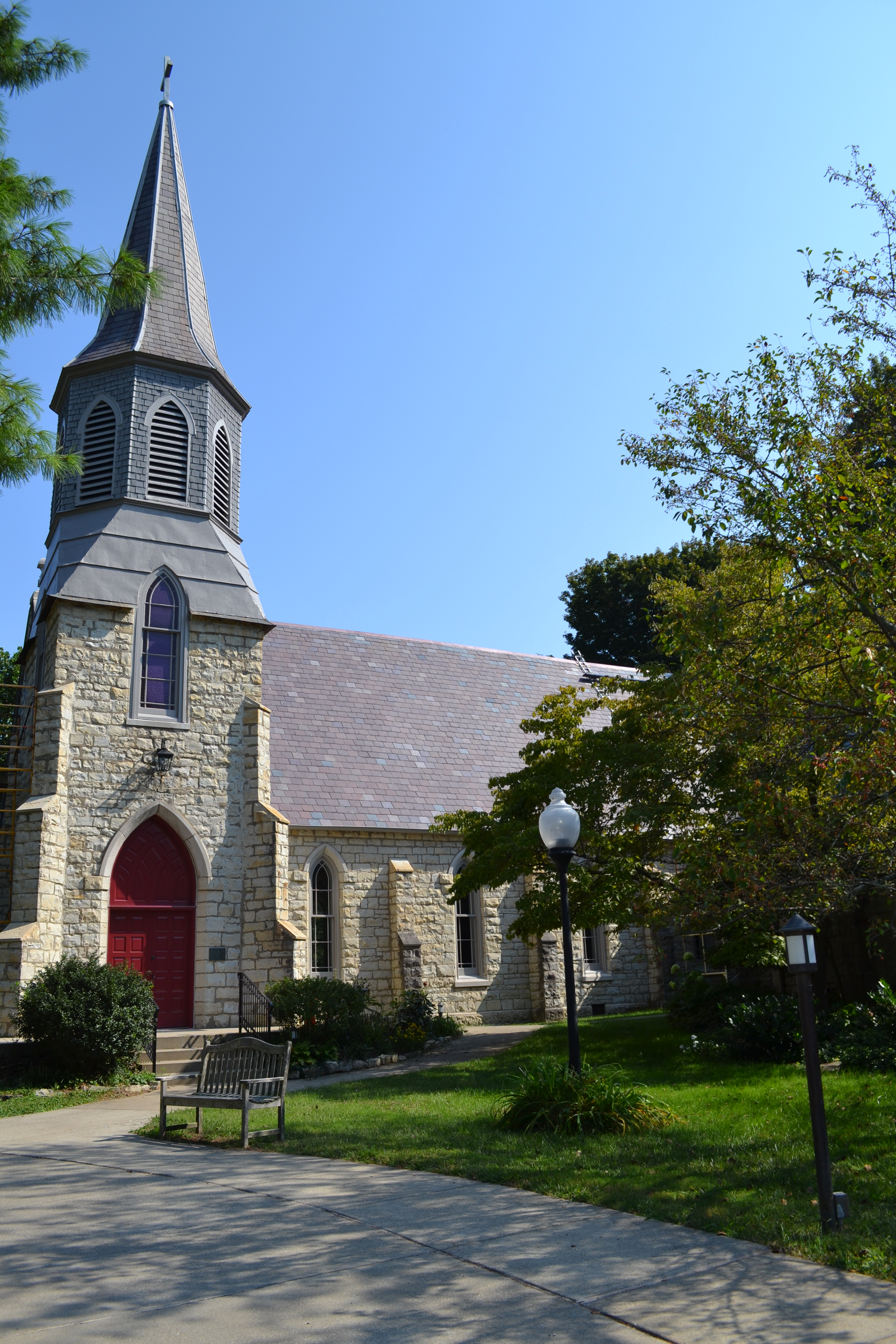

- Location within Kentucky Location within the United States
- Nearest city: Pewee Valley, Kentucky
- Coordinates: 38°18′47″N 85°29′4″W
- Area: 5 acres (2.0 ha)
- Built: 1869
- Architect: Talbott, B.; Redin, William H.
- Architectural style: Gothic Revival, Rural Gothic Revival
- NRHP reference No.: 85003072
- Added to NRHP: December 05, 1985

Saint James' Episcopal Church is a historic church in Pewee Valley, Kentucky. It was built in 1869 and added to the National Register of Historic Places in 1985.

Native Pewee Valley limestone was used to construct the building in a Gothic Revival style. It was completed in 1869 at a cost of $4,000. William Henry Redin (1822–1904) was the architect. The design was based on sketches made by Kentucky Bishop Benjamin Bosworth Smith of a 12th-century country church during a trip to England. In 1908, the congregation began a project to add a rectory. They sold 14 acres from the original 20-acre site to raise funds for construction of the rectory.
