= Bradshaw-Duncan House =

Historic house in Kentucky, United States

- U.S. National Register of Historic Places
- Location: 8502 Todds Point Rd., near Crestwood, Kentucky
- Coordinates: 38°18′12″N 85°26′03″W
- Area: less than one acre
- Built: 1814, 1855–60, c.1970, 2000
- Architectural style: Italianate
- NRHP reference No.: 05000254
- Added to NRHP: July 14, 2005

The Bradshaw-Duncan House, also known as Cedarcrest Farm at 8502 Todds Point Rd. near Crestwood, Kentucky, was listed on the National Register of Historic Places in 2005.

The Italianate house was built during 1855–1860, incorporating an original Federal-styled part of the house built in 1814. It was modified further in c.1970 and 2000.
