= Mary Lockwood Matthews =

American home economist (1882–1968)

Mary Lockwood Matthews was a home economist and the first Dean of Purdue University's School of Home Economics.

== Early life and education ==
Matthews was born on October 13, 1882, in Pewee Valley, Kentucky. After the death of both her parents before the age of seven, she and her brother Meredith were adopted by Virginia Claypool Meredith, a friend of their mother and leader in agricultural education.

In 1900 she graduated from the St. Anthony School of Agriculture, after which she enrolled at the University of Minnesota, where she graduated with a BS in Home Economics in 1904, the first woman to do so at that school.

== Career at Purdue University ==
In 1910 Matthews was hired as an instructor for the Household Economics Extension Service of Purdue School of Agriculture. The Household Economics program at Purdue was established in 1905, and she was promoted to the head of the program in 1912. In 1926 the program expanded to the School of Home Economics and Matthews was made the first Dean of the school, and the first female academic dean at Purdue. She served as the dean until her retirement in 1952.

In 1976, Matthews Hall at Purdue University, the original Home Economics building, was renamed named in her honor.

== Death ==
Matthews died in 1968.
