= D. W. Griffith House =

Historic house in Kentucky, United States

- U.S. National Register of Historic Places
- U.S. Historic district – Contributing property
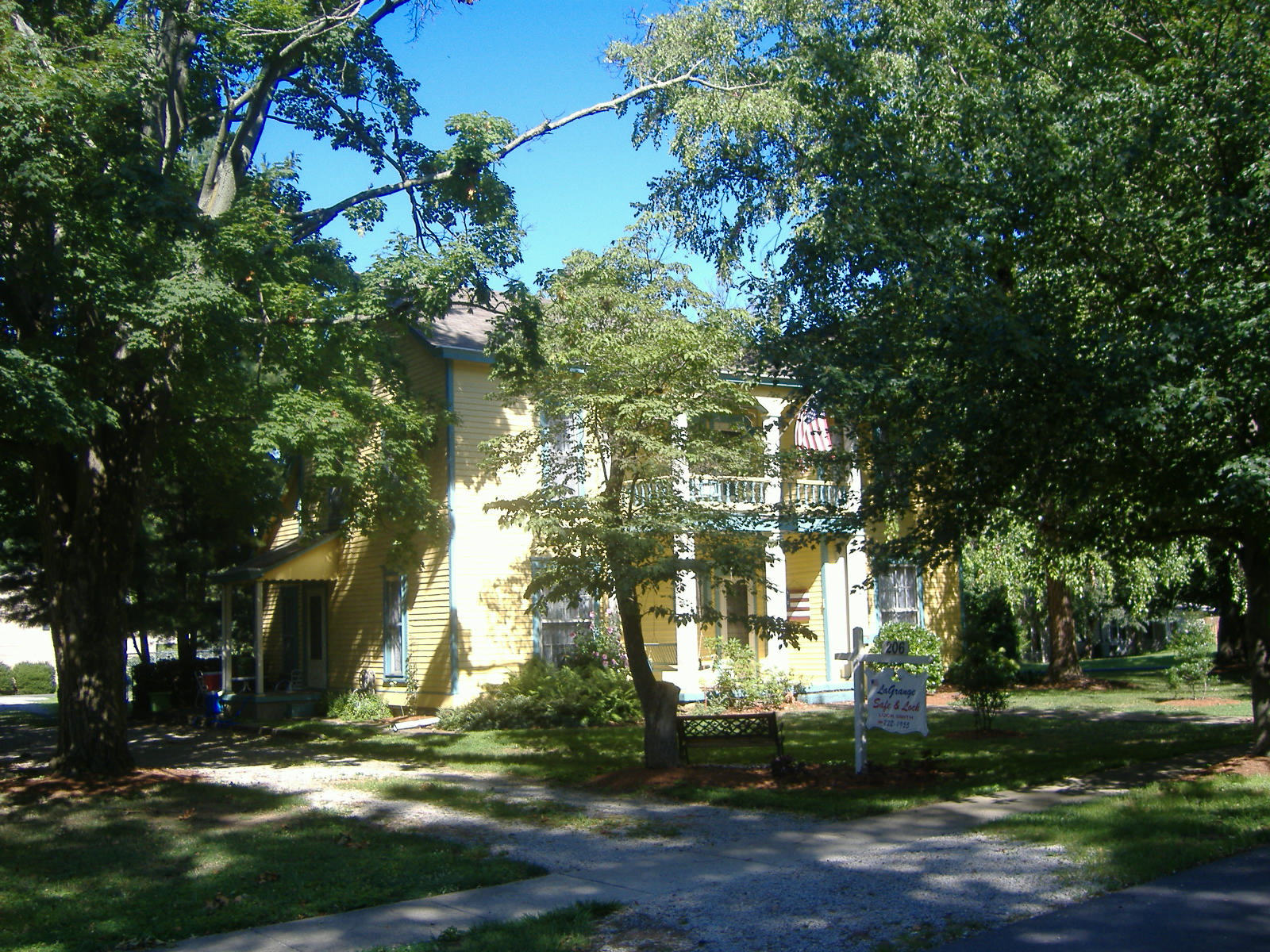

- Location within Kentucky Location within the United States
- Location: La Grange, Kentucky
- Coordinates: 38°24′30″N 85°23′2″W
- Built: 1905
- Part of: Central La Grange Historic District (ID88001316)
- NRHP reference No.: 76000935

Significant dates
- Added to NRHP: June 3, 1976
- Designated CP: September 8, 1988

The D. W. Griffith House is an historic building in La Grange, Kentucky in the United States. It was owned by movie director D. W. Griffith, who rose to fame with his movies The Birth of a Nation and Intolerance.

The house was originally constructed in 1905 as a home for a Charles and Sue Smith, but it later became a funeral parlor. Griffith bought it as a residence for his mother Mary in 1913, who lived there until her death a year later. Afterward, Griffith's sister Ruth lived there until she died in 1934; then Griffith's brother and his family lived in the house. After D. W. Griffith married his second wife, they moved to the home in 1936, staying there until 1939 when Griffith went to California to work on a film. Griffith sold the house in 1940, but his niece lived there until 1950, when it was sold once again to be made into apartments. Griffith never returned to the area, not even to receive the honorary doctorate in literature the University of Louisville gave him in 1945. New owners in 1974 returned the house to a more home-like use.

Griffith had always considered La Grange his hometown, having spent his boyhood at a nearby farm until his mother had to sell it for debts left after his father died, and even signed in hotel registers as being from the town, no matter where he was actually living at the time. When Griffith died, as according to his will, his remains were returned to Oldham County and buried eight miles (13 km) south of La Grange in Mount Tabor Cemetery, Centerfield, Kentucky, where his family had a plot.

The house today remains privately owned, but is considered a historic attraction. The current owners have lived there since 1983. Several items related to Griffith furnish the house. At the end of the sidewalk by the house one can still see the signature Griffith made in the concrete.
