= Mary Spencer Nay =

American painter and printmaker (1913–1993)

Mary Spencer Nay (1913–1993) was an American painter and printmaker. Born in Crestwood, Kentucky, Nay studied at the Art Center Association School in Louisville from 1934 to 1940. She attended the Cincinnati Art Academy in 1942 and earned both her bachelor's and Master of Arts degrees from the University of Louisville, in 1941 and 1960, respectively. She also took lessons at the Art Students League of New York in 1942, and in Provincetown, Massachusetts under Boris Margo from 1950 to 1951. She taught at the University of Louisville for twenty years before retiring as the Marcia S. Hite professor of painting in 1979. Nay exhibited widely in solo and group shows and was a member of the Provincetown Art Association, among other organizations. Her work is in the collections of the Evansville Museum of Arts and Science and the Speed Art Museum, among others. Nay died of a gastrointestinal illness in Provincetown and was survived by two daughters. A scholarship in her honor at the University of Louisville was created by the Hite Art Institute in 1993.
