= Orchard Grass Hills, Kentucky =

- City
- Location of Orchard Grass Hills in Oldham County, Kentucky.
- Coordinates: 38°19′24″N 85°31′25″W
- Country: United States
- State: Kentucky
- County: Oldham
- Incorporated: 1979

Area
  - Total: 0.39 sq mi (1.01 km^{2})
  - Land: 0.39 sq mi (1.01 km^{2})
  - Water: 0 sq mi (0.00 km^{2})
- Elevation: 666 ft (203 m)

Population (2020)
  - Total: 1,536
  - Estimate (2022): 1,575
  - Density: 3,954.6/sq mi (1,526.88/km^{2})
- Time zone: UTC-5 (Eastern (EST))
  - Summer (DST): UTC-4 (EDT)
- ZIP code: 40014
- Area code: 502
- FIPS code: 21-58200
- GNIS feature ID: 2404442
- Website: orchardgrasshills.gov

Orchard Grass Hills is a home rule-class city in Oldham County, Kentucky, in the United States. The population was 1,536 as of the 2020 census.

== Geography ==
According to the United States Census Bureau, the city has a total area of 0.3 square miles (0.78 km^{2}), all land.

== Demographics ==
Historical population
Census	Pop.	Note	%±
1980	1,047		—
1990	1,058		1.1%
2000	1,031		−2.6%
2010	1,595		54.7%
2020	1,536		−3.7%
2022 (est.)	1,575		2.5%
U.S. Decennial Census

=== 2020 census ===
As of the 2020 census, Orchard Grass Hills had a population of 1,536. The median age was 34.7 years. 32.2% of residents were under the age of 18 and 10.6% of residents were 65 years of age or older. For every 100 females there were 101.3 males, and for every 100 females age 18 and over there were 96.8 males age 18 and over.

100.0% of residents lived in urban areas, while 0.0% lived in rural areas.

There were 515 households in Orchard Grass Hills, of which 52.2% had children under the age of 18 living in them. Of all households, 63.5% were married-couple households, 11.8% were households with a male householder and no spouse or partner present, and 19.2% were households with a female householder and no spouse or partner present. About 16.9% of all households were made up of individuals and 8.5% had someone living alone who was 65 years of age or older.

There were 526 housing units, of which 2.1% were vacant. The homeowner vacancy rate was 1.9% and the rental vacancy rate was 0.0%.

Racial composition as of the 2020 census
Race	Number	Percent
White	1,281	83.4%
Black or African American	78	5.1%
American Indian and Alaska Native	3	0.2%
Asian	18	1.2%
Native Hawaiian and Other Pacific Islander	1	0.1%
Some other race	18	1.2%
Two or more races	137	8.9%
Hispanic or Latino (of any race)	77	5.0%

=== 2000 census ===
As of the 2000 census, there were 1,031 people, 330 households, and 279 families residing in the city. The population density was 3,068.7 inhabitants per square mile (1,184.8/km^{2}). There were 341 housing units at an average density of 1,015.0 per square mile (391.9/km^{2}). The racial makeup of the city was 94.08% White, 4.46% African American, 0.78% Asian, 0.58% from other races, and 0.10% from two or more races. Hispanic or Latino of any race were 1.36% of the population.

There were 330 households, out of which 51.8% had children under the age of 18 living with them; 70.9% were married couples living together; 10.0% had a female householder with no husband present; and 15.2% were non-families. 10.9% of all households were made up of individuals, and 0.6% had someone living alone who was 65 years of age or older. The average household size was 3.12 and the average family size was 3.39.

In the city, the population was spread out, with 35.0% under the age of 18, 6.5% from 18 to 24, 38.5% from 25 to 44, 18.6% from 45 to 64, and 1.4% who were 65 years of age or older. The median age was 30 years. For every 100 females, there were 100.6 males. For every 100 females age 18 and over, there were 98.8 males.

The median income for a household in the city was $63,824, and the median income for a family was $64,625. Males had a median income of $41,190 versus $26,836 for females. The per capita income for the city was $21,965. About 1.5% of families and 2.5% of the population were below the poverty line, including 2.3% of those under age 18 and 11.1% of those age 65 or over.
