= Albert E. Clore House =

Historic house in Kentucky, United States

- U.S. National Register of Historic Places
- Location: 6400 Clore Lane, Crestwood, Kentucky
- Coordinates: 38°19′58″N 85°30′04″W
- Area: 2.2 acres (0.89 ha)
- Built: 1890
- Built by: Maddox, Walter
- Architectural style: Stick/eastlake, Shingle Style
- NRHP reference No.: 83002842
- Added to NRHP: May 26, 1983

The Albert E. Clore House, at 6400 Clore Lane in Crestwood, Kentucky, was built in 1890. It was listed on the National Register of Historic Places in 1983.

The house was deemed significant as "an excellent example of a late 19th century residence which combines elements of shingle and stick styles of architecture which were popular during the late 1800s. The Clore family was in Oldham County in early days of settlement and. longtime residence since the early 1800s and associated with town of Crestwood. The house is one of the Victorian houses documented in the comprehensive survey of the county. The Clore family's main livelihood was agriculture and they proved to be prominent farmers in the area."
