= Wooldridge-Rose House =

Historic house in Kentucky, United States

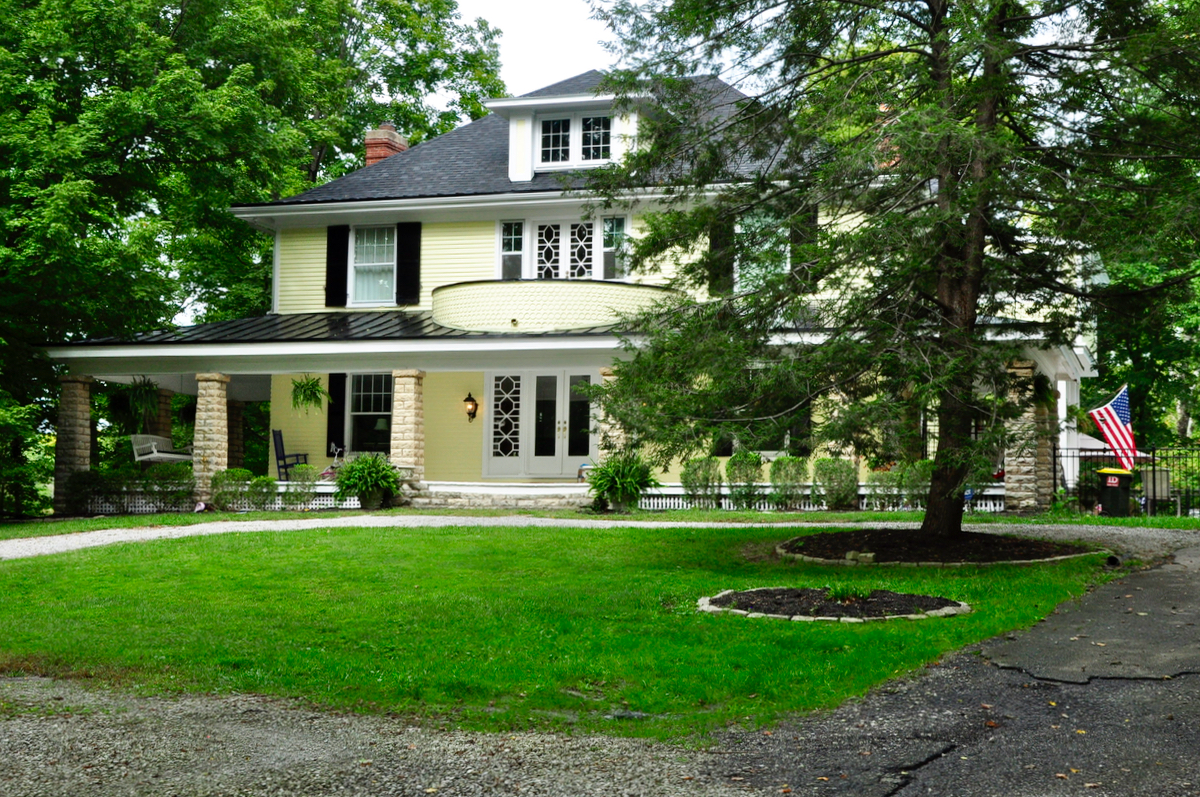

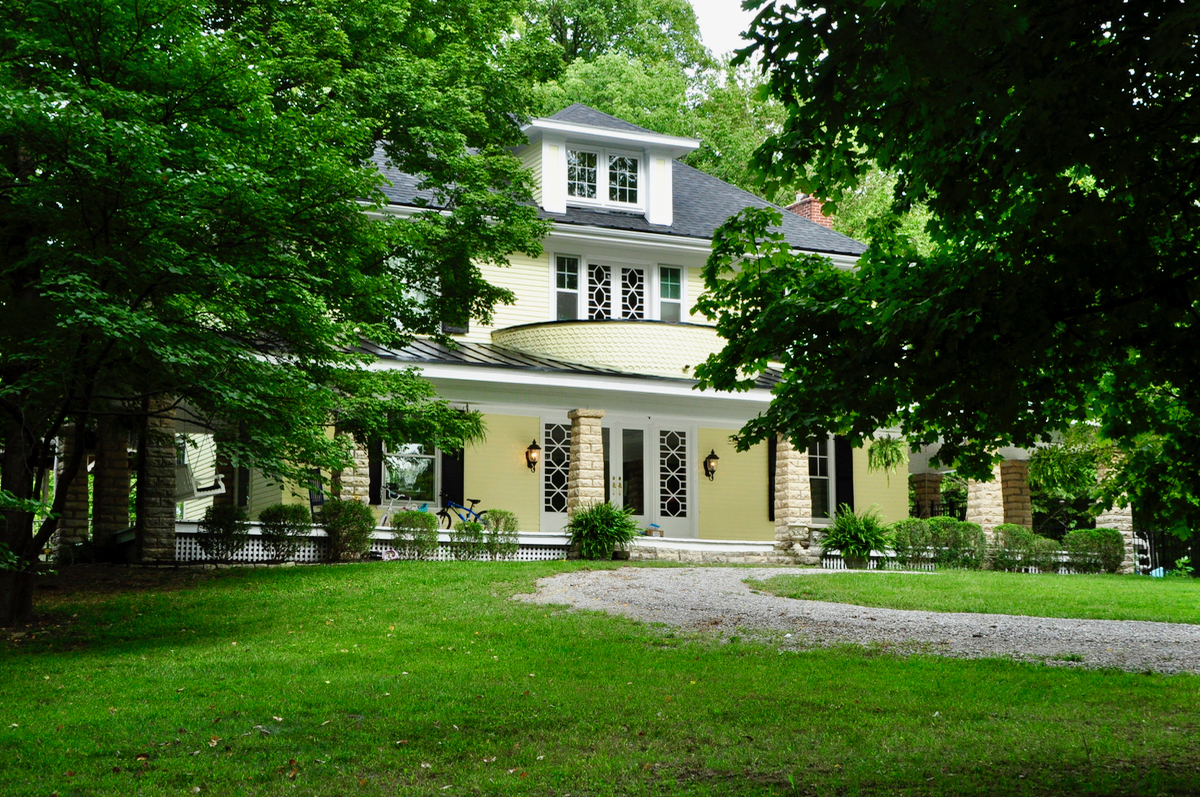

The Wooldridge-Rose House, located in Pewee Valley, Kentucky, was placed on the National Register of Historic Places in 2007. It is a c.1905 Colonial Revival-style house, two stories high of considerable size. Its foundation is limestone block foundation with a roof of tin and shingles, and weatherboard siding.

It was built by Powhatan Wooldridge for one of his daughters, Annie, who chose not to live there. In 1917 it was purchased by Hugh Rose, a banker.
