= Kentucky Route 329 =

State highway in Kentucky, United States

Kentucky Route 329
- KY 329; mainline in red, bypass route in blue

Route information
- Maintained by KTC
- Length: 9.744 mi (15.681 km)

Major junctions
- West end: US 42 in Prospect
- I-71 near Crestwood
- East end: KY 146 in Crestwood

Location
- Country: United States
- State: Kentucky
- Counties: Jefferson, Oldham

Highway system
- Kentucky State Highway System; Interstate; US; State; Parkways
← KY 328	→ KY 330

Kentucky Route 329 is a state highway located 15 miles (24 km) northeast of downtown Louisville, Kentucky. The western terminus of the route is at U.S. Route 42 in Prospect. The eastern terminus is at KY 146 in Crestwood. An undivided, four lane bypass route of KY 329 exists in the vicinity of Crestwood.

== Route description ==
KY 329 begins at an intersection with US 42 in Prospect, Jefferson County, heading east on two-lane undivided Boy Scout Road. The road passes through wooded residential neighborhoods, crossing into Oldham County. The route becomes Covered Bridge Road and heads through a mix of farmland and woodland with some housing developments. KY 329 comes to an intersection with KY 1694 and forms a brief concurrency with that route before it splits to the north. A short distance later, KY 329 intersects the western terminus of KY 1817, at which point it heads southeast as an unnamed road. The route heads through more rural areas and curves south as it comes to an interchange with I-71. Past this interchange, the briefly becomes four lanes before making a turn south, with KY 329 Bypass heading straight. KY 329 heads into Crestwood as a two-lane road and passes residential developments. The route heads into business areas and forms a brief concurrency with KY 22. Past this, KY 329 winds south on Lagrange Road and crosses a CSX railroad line before ending at KY 146.

== Major intersections ==
County	Location	mi	km	Destinations	Notes
Jefferson	Prospect	0.000	0.000	US 42	
Oldham		4.934	7.941	KY 1694 south	West end of KY 1694 overlap
Oldham		5.633	9.065	KY 1694 north	East end of KY 1694 overlap
Oldham		5.889	9.477	KY 1817	Western terminus of KY 1817
Oldham		7.679	12.358	I-71	Exit 14 on I-71
Oldham		8.011	12.892	KY 329 Byp.	Western terminus of KY 329 Byp.
Oldham	Crestwood	9.623	15.487	KY 22 west	West end of KY 22 overlap
Oldham	Crestwood	9.647	15.525	KY 22 east	East end of KY 22 overlap
Oldham	Crestwood	9.744	15.681	KY 146	
1.000 mi = 1.609 km; 1.000 km = 0.621 mi: Concurrency terminus

== KY 329 Bypass ==
Kentucky Route 329 Bypass
- Veterans Memorial Parkway
- Location: Crestwood
- Length: 2.062 mi (3.318 km)

Kentucky Route 329 Bypass (KY 329 Bypass) is a 2.062-mile (3.318 km) long bypass route of KY 329 around the northern edge of Crestwood. The western terminus of the route is at KY 329 roughly 0.5 miles (0.80 km) south of where KY 329 meets I-71. The bypass heads east as four-lane undivided Veterans Memorial Parkway, passing through fields. The road curves to the south and runs between residential neighborhoods to the west and commercial areas and South Oldham High School to the east. KY 329 Bypass turns east and intersects KY 146 in a commercial area before becoming a five-lane road with a center left-turn lane and passing under a CSX railroad line. The eastern terminus is at KY 22 in Crestwood.

=== Major intersections ===
The entire route is in Crestwood, Oldham County.

mi	km	Destinations	Notes
0.000	0.000	KY 329	Western terminus
1.756	2.826	KY 146 (Lagrange Road)	
2.062	3.318	KY 22	Eastern terminus
1.000 mi = 1.609 km; 1.000 km = 0.621 mi

== See also ==
- Roads in Louisville, Kentucky
