= St. Aloysius Church (Pewee Valley, Kentucky) =

Historic church in Kentucky, United States

- St. Aloysius Roman Catholic Church
- U.S. National Register of Historic Places
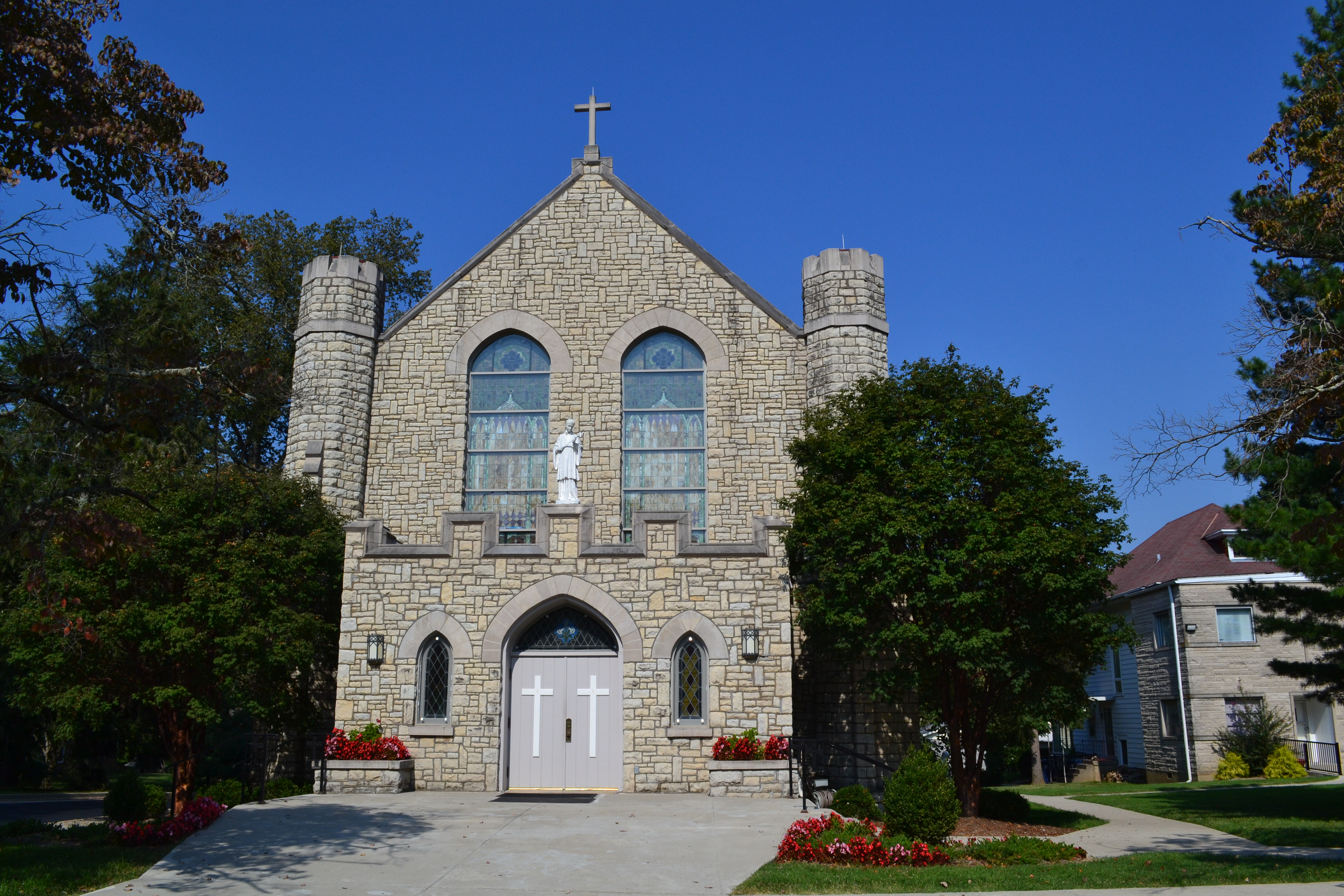

- Location within Kentucky Location within the United States
- Location: 202 Mt. Mercy Dr., Peewee Valley, Kentucky
- Coordinates: 38°18′29″N 85°29′30″W
- Area: less than one acre
- Built: 1914
- Architectural style: Late Gothic Revival
- MPS: Peewee Valley MPS
- NRHP reference No.: 89001983
- Added to NRHP: November 27, 1989

St. Aloysius Roman Catholic Church is a historic church at 202 Mt. Mercy Drive in Peewee Valley, Kentucky. It was built in 1914 and added to the National Register in 1989.

It is a small Late Gothic Revival-style church. To its northeast is a historic rectory which has been so altered that it was deemed non-contributing, and a non-contributing 1950s school building associated with the church.

It is built of limestone. It has corner towers and a "boldly crenelated front vestibule".
