= Pewee Valley Confederate Cemetery =

United States historic site in Oldham County, Kentucky

- U.S. National Register of Historic Places
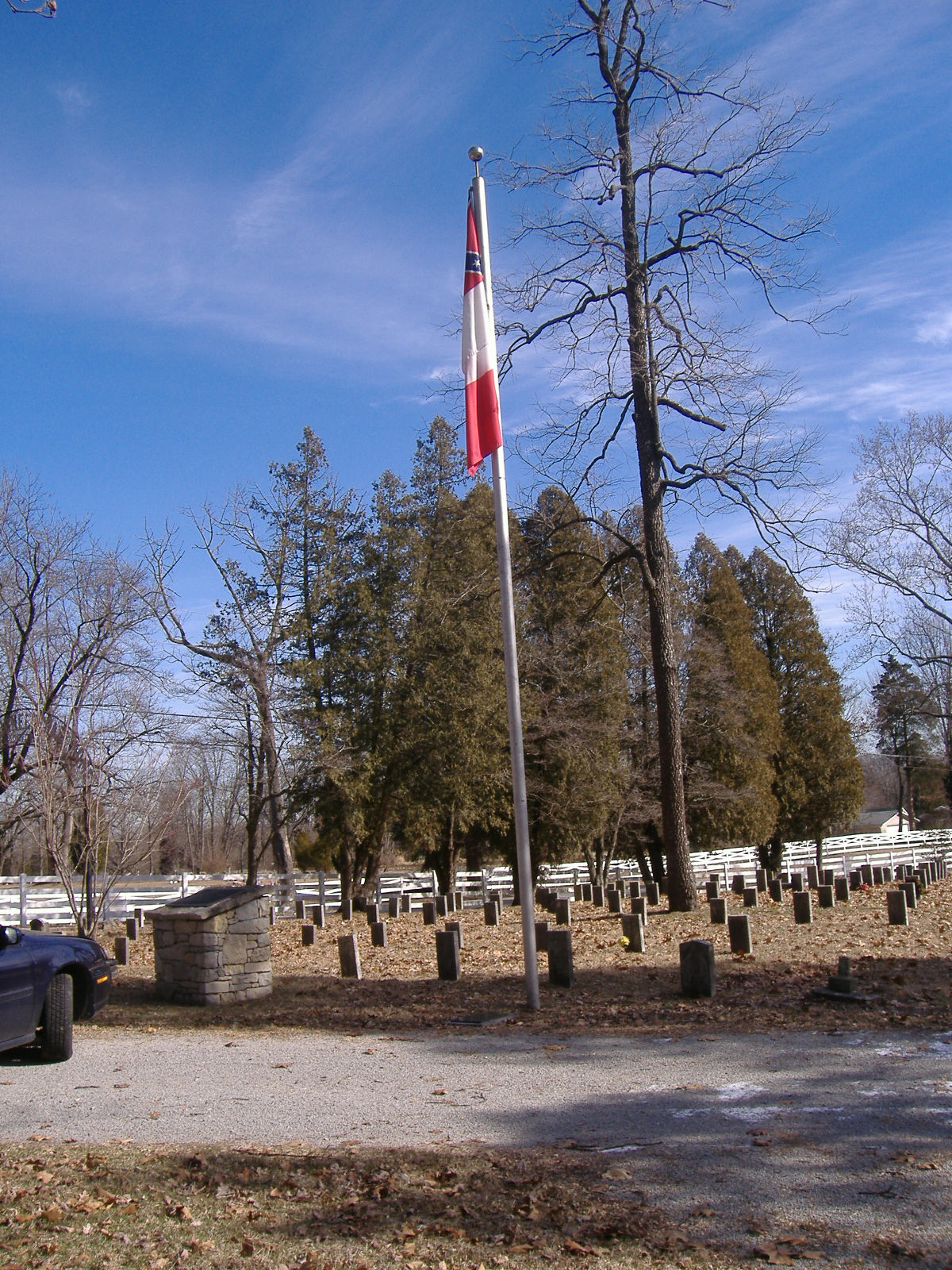

- Location within Kentucky Location within the United States
- Nearest city: Pewee Valley, Kentucky
- Built: 1904
- MPS: Pewee Valley MPS
- NRHP reference No.: 89001984
- Added to NRHP: November 27, 1989

- Confederate Memorial in Pewee Valley
- U.S. National Register of Historic Places
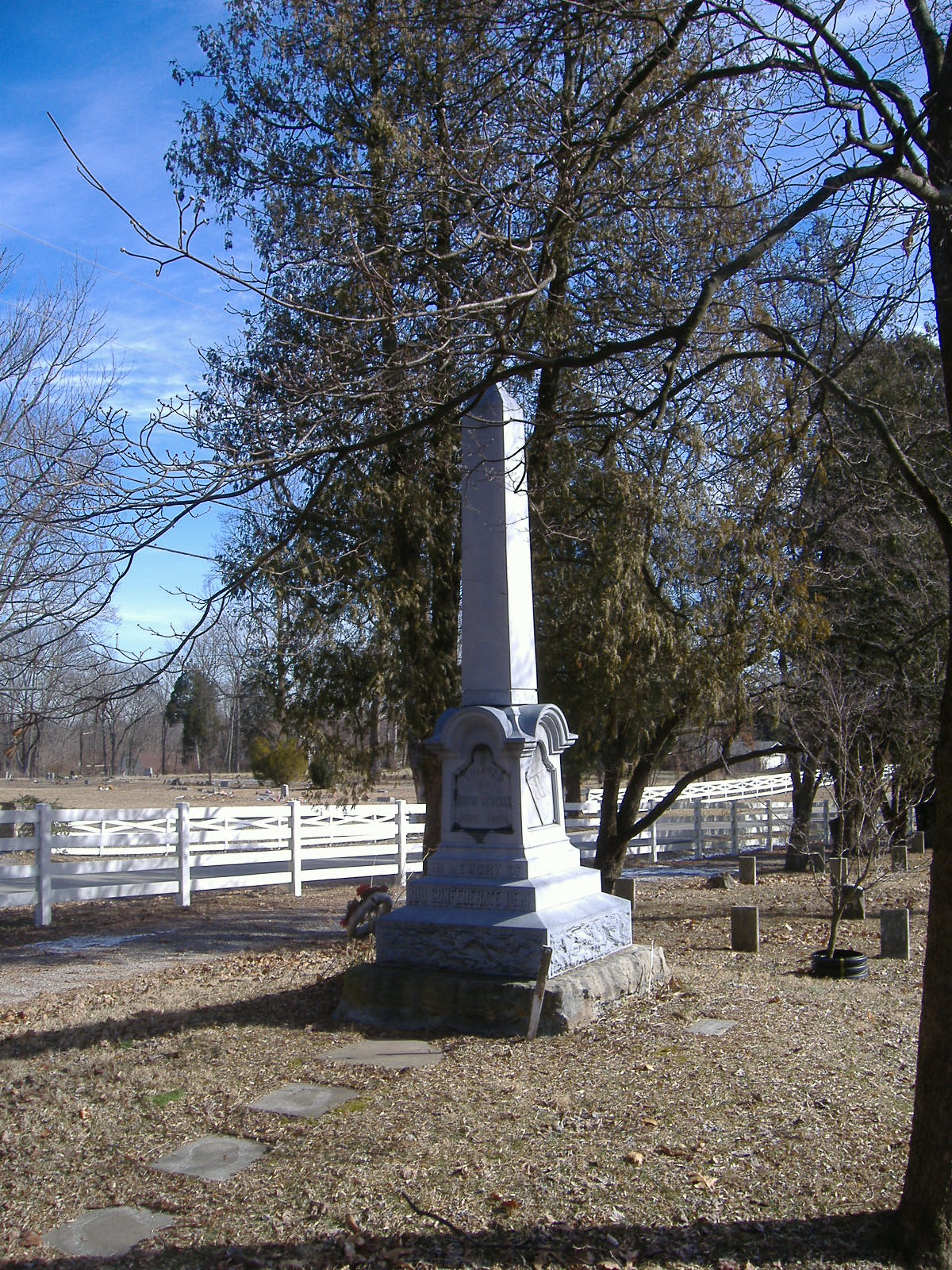
- Built: 1904
- MPS: Civil War Monuments of Kentucky MPS
- NRHP reference No.: 97000673
- Added to NRHP: July 17, 1997

Pewee Valley Confederate Cemetery is one mile from the old Kentucky Confederate Home site. The National Register of Historic Places lists the cemetery and separately an individual monument within it, the Confederate Memorial in Pewee Valley, as part of the Civil War Monuments of Kentucky MPS. It is the only cemetery for Confederate veterans, 313 in total, that is an official state burying ground in Kentucky.

== History ==
In May 1871, several local citizens of Pewee Valley, Kentucky, twenty miles (32 km) northeast of Louisville, Kentucky, decided they wanted a local public cemetery. By August 1871, the land was purchased. The following spring, in 1872, the cemetery was organized, and plants were placed to beautify the area. When they were finished, they asked for a charter from the Kentucky state government.

Close to the cemetery, the Villa Ridge Inn was built in 1889. The site was a four-story summer resort that was to be popular with Louisville entrepreneurs and their families. However, despite a $90,000 construction with "majestic architecture", it never attracted enough visitors to stay in business. Between the inn's closure and 1902, it temporarily became a private high school, the successor to the Kentucky College for Young Ladies.

When the Confederate home was approved in 1904, the cemetery was segregated into three parts: one for Confederate veterans, one for whites, and one for blacks.

In 1902, the Kentucky General Assembly unanimously approved the building of a veterans home specifically for Confederate veterans of the American Civil War by the cemetery. It was done at the behest of former Confederate officer Bennett H. Young, who had long desired such a facility as he saw many former Confederate veterans could no longer take care of themselves. After Young's group acquired $16,000, the legislation was approved. Young's group of Confederate veterans and the Daughters of the Confederacy chose the Villa Ridge site just outside the cemetery, as it was well-sited and inexpensive compared to what it had cost to build in 1889. The cemetery was established shortly after the hospital was opened, with the special monument built soon afterward. The total area of the home and cemetery was 11,275 square feet.

In the years it was an active veterans facility, it provided a hospital, nursing care, food, entertainment, and religious services for up to 350 veterans at a time, providing a home for 700 former Confederate soldiers in its years of operations. The requirements to be a resident of the home were to not only be a former Confederate soldier but to have been a resident of Kentucky for the past six months, be mentally stable, and have no problems with alcoholism. Many veterans once served under John Hunt Morgan. A fire on March 25, 1920, destroyed the main building, an infirmary ward, and laundry. There were no deaths, and the rest of the facility was enough to house those residents still using the home. Eventually, the number of veterans who could be served dwindled, and by 1934 the hospital was no more, with the remaining five residents being transferred to the nearby Pewee Valley Sanitorium.

== Present day ==
All that remains of the hospital is its main gate, which was moved to become the entrance arch for the cemetery one mile away and part of the walkway from the house to the railroad. A sign is placed along the pathway to mark it. The source of fresh water for the facility, a reservoir, was filled in during the 1990s.

The monument is unique for Kentucky Civil War monuments in that it is built of zinc, whereas most are made of marble or limestone. Another oddity is that the obelisk and base are separated by an inscribed Gothic altar that acts as an arch on the face of the monument. Confederate flags are also crafted on the monument.

== See also ==
- Alabama Confederate Soldiers Home

== Gallery ==
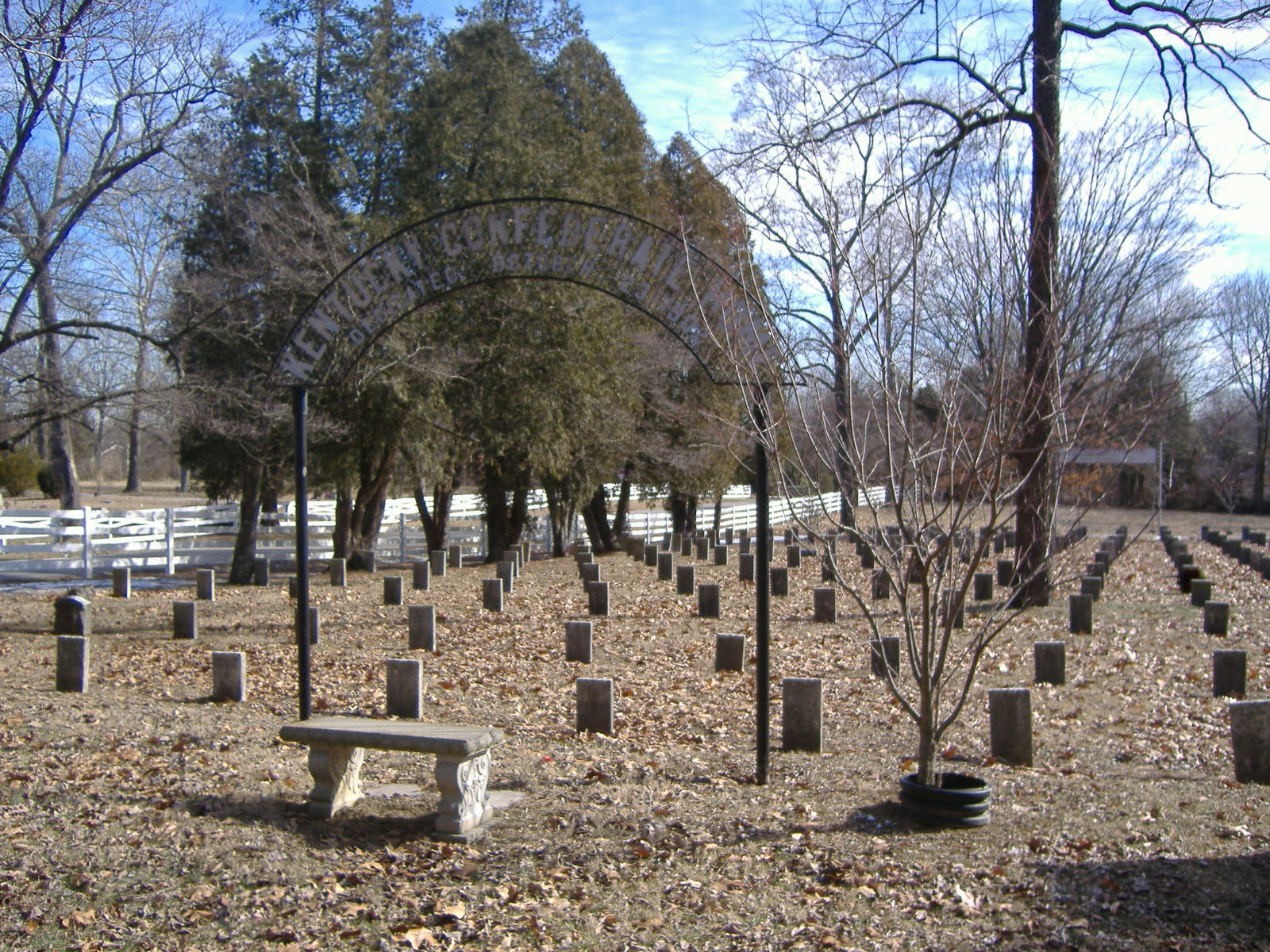
The gate is all that's left on the home

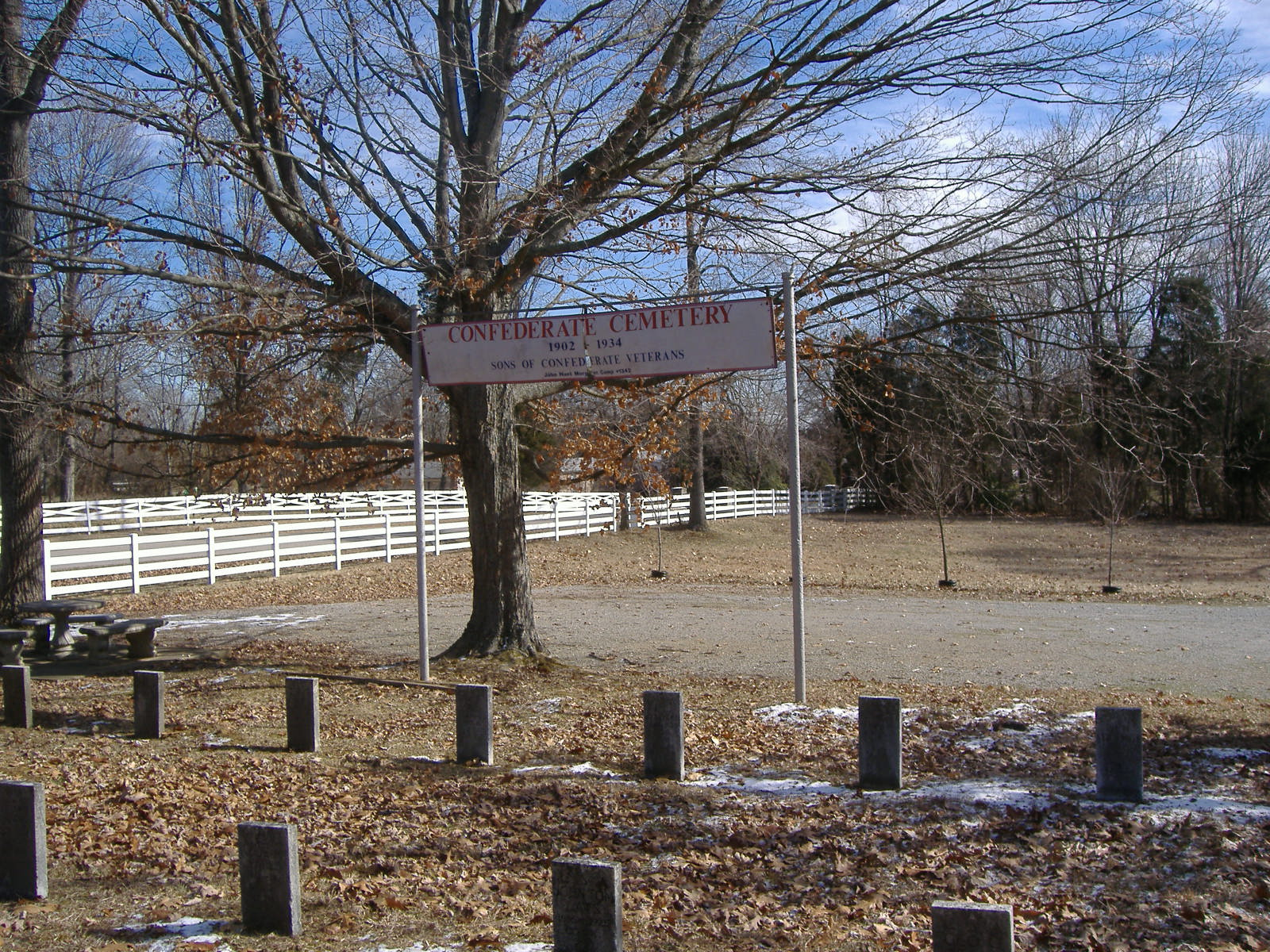

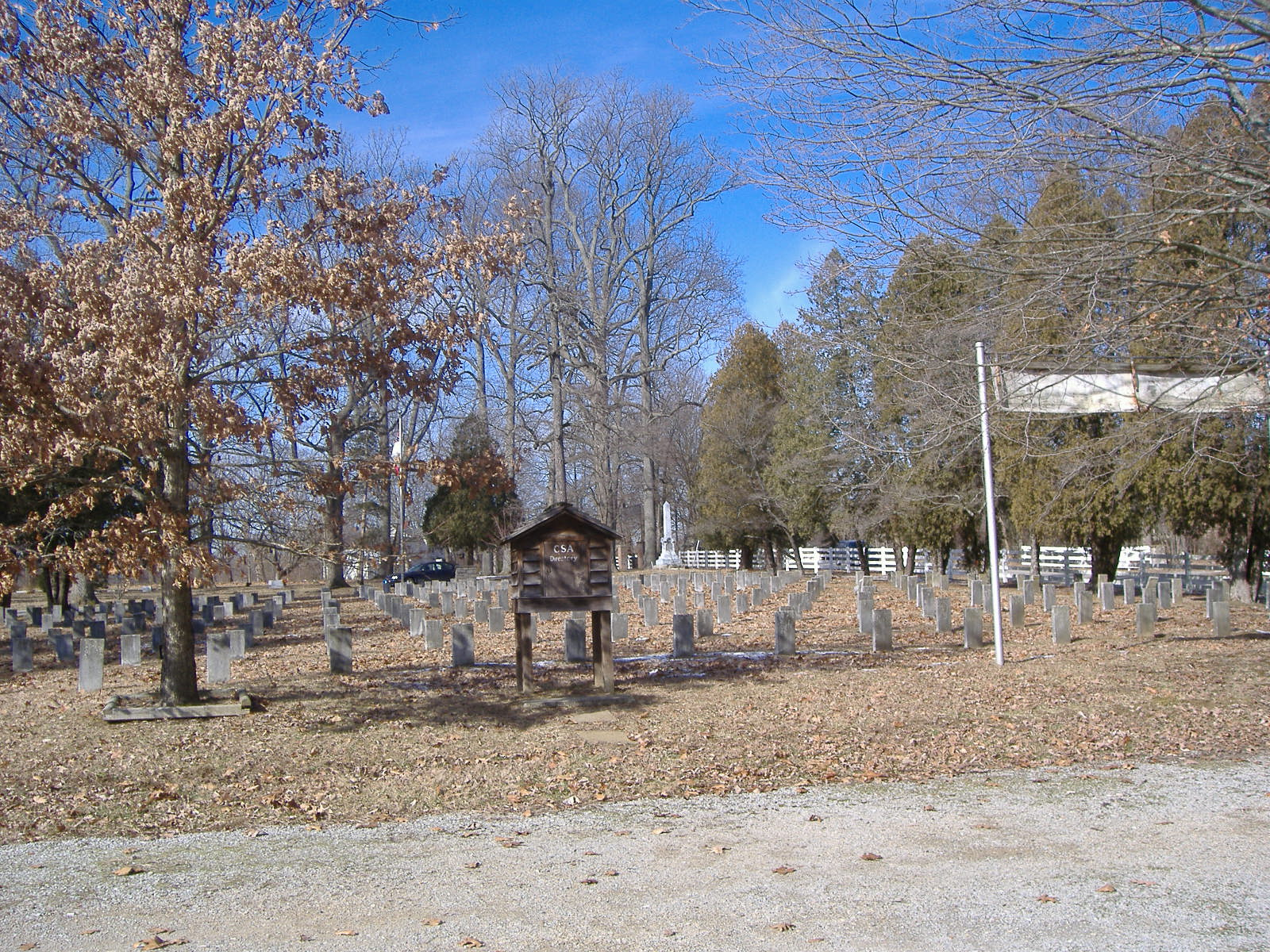
Backside of the cemetery, with a visitor's sheet available in the wooden structure

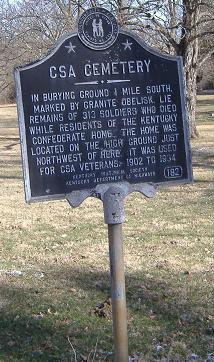
Marker denoting the cemetery at the corner of Maple Avenue and State Hwy. 146
