= Mountain Creek, Alabama =

- Unincorporated community
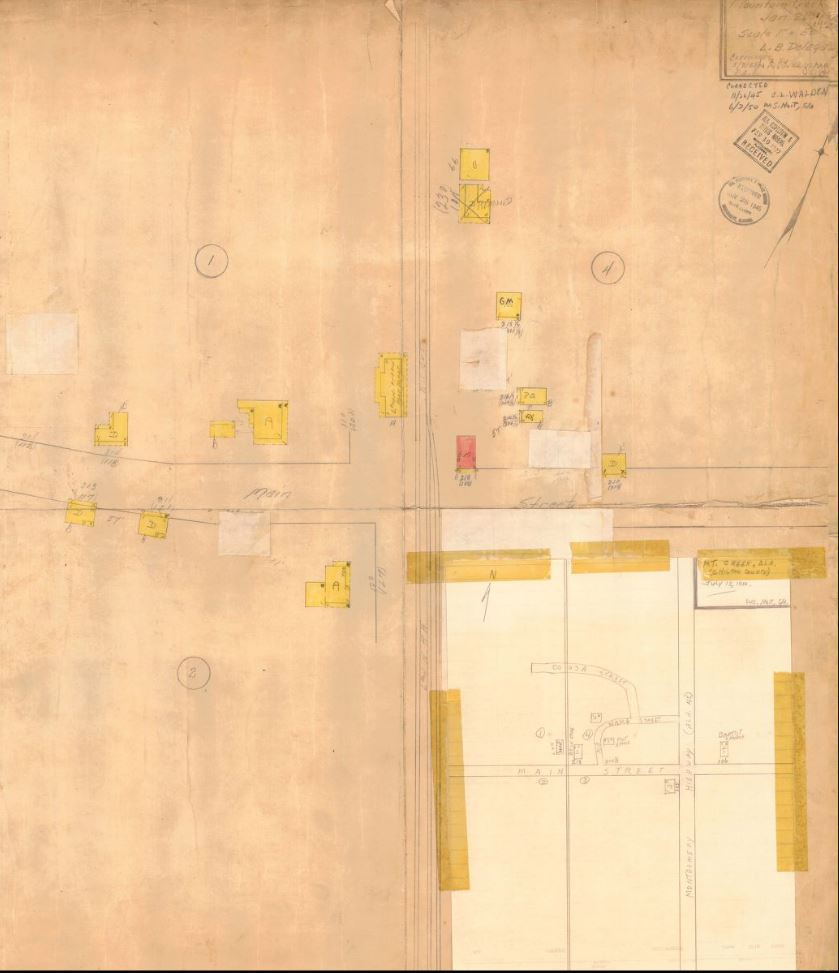
- 1922 fire insurance map of Mountain Creek

- Location within the state of Alabama Mountain Creek, Alabama (the United States)
- Coordinates: 32°42′38″N 86°28′44″W
- Country: United States
- State: Alabama
- County: Chilton
- Elevation: 528 ft (161 m)
- Time zone: UTC-6 (Central (CST))
  - Summer (DST): UTC-5 (CDT)
- Area codes: 205, 659
- GNIS feature ID: 152547

Mountain Creek is an unincorporated community in southeastern Chilton County, Alabama, United States.

== Confederate Memorial Park ==
Mountain Creek was the site of the Alabama Confederate Soldiers Home from 1902 to 1939, now the Confederate Memorial Park. The 102-acre (0.41 km^{2}) park has a museum, research facility, historic structures, ruins and two cemeteries with the graves of over 300 Confederate soldiers.
