= Reuben Sale House =

Historic house in Kentucky, United States

- U.S. National Register of Historic Places
- Location: 3700 Smith Lane, near La Grange, Kentucky
- Coordinates: 38°28′04″N 85°25′30″W
- Area: 3.2 acres (1.3 ha)
- Built: c.1833
- NRHP reference No.: 82001574
- Added to NRHP: November 24, 1982

The Reuben Sale House, at 3700 Smith Lane in Oldham County, Kentucky near La Grange, was built around 1833. It was listed on the National Register of Historic Places in 1982.

It is a two-story, single-pile brick house with four bays and Flemish bond brickwork on its front facade. A " fine double-crib log barn" is a second contributing building.
