= Skylight, Kentucky =

Unincorporated community in Kentucky, United States

Skylight
- Unincorporated community
- Location within the state of Kentucky
- Coordinates: 38°25′57″N 85°31′18″W
- Country: United States
- State: Kentucky
- County: Oldham
- Elevation: 728 ft (222 m)
- Time zone: UTC-5 (Eastern (EST))
  - Summer (DST): UTC-4 (EDT)
- GNIS ID: 503623

Skylight is an unincorporated community in Oldham County, Kentucky, United States. It was also known as Tippecanoe.
