= Harrods Creek Baptist Church and Rev. William Kellar House =

Historic church in Kentucky, United States

- U.S. National Register of Historic Places
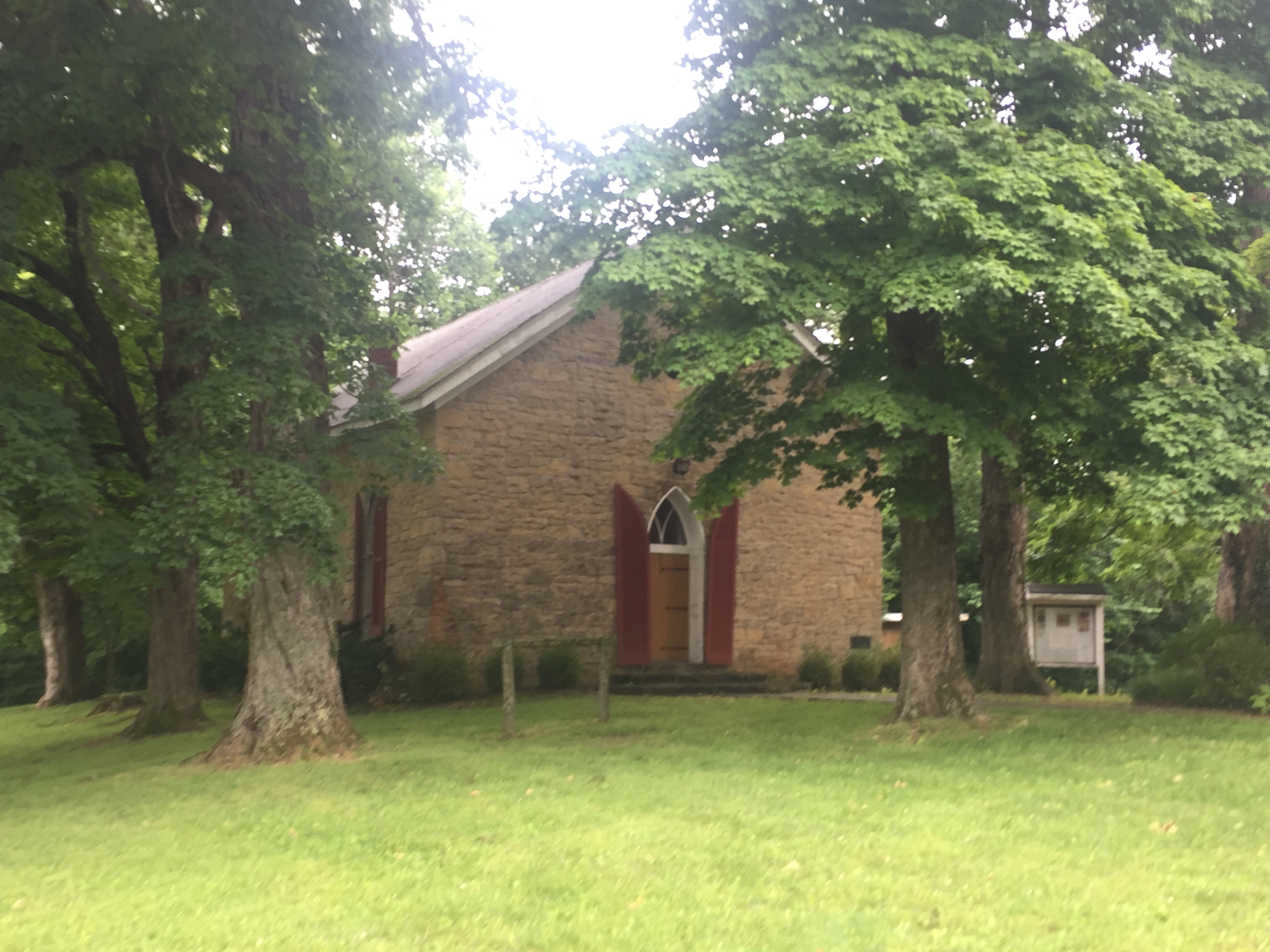
- Church in 2022

- Location within Kentucky Location within the United States
- Nearest city: Crestwood, Kentucky
- Coordinates: 38°21′32″N 85°30′39″W
- Area: 7 acres (2.8 ha)
- Built: 1807, c.1810
- NRHP reference No.: 76000934
- Added to NRHP: September 08, 1976

The Harrods Creek Baptist Church and Rev. William Kellar House was listed on the National Register of Historic Places in 1976. The church and house are located northwest of Crestwood, Kentucky, on Old Brownsboro Rd.

The Harrods Creek Church, built in c.1810, is a simple stone building. It faces north and has three windows on its east and west sides.

The Rev. William Kellar House, located .25 miles (0.40 km) to the west, up an old road, was built in 1807. It is a three-bay, two-story stone house with a brick ell.
