= Ashwood Avenue Historic District =

Historic district in Kentucky, United States

- U.S. National Register of Historic Places
- U.S. Historic district
- Location: Roughly Ash Ave. from La Grange Rd. to Elm Ave., Pewee Valley, Kentucky
- Coordinates: 38°18′26″N 85°29′19″W
- Area: 23 acres (9.3 ha)
- Built: 1890
- Architectural style: Queen Anne, Bungalow/craftsman, Colonial Revival
- MPS: Peewee Valley MPS
- NRHP reference No.: 89000951
- Added to NRHP: August 7, 1989

The Ashwood Avenue Historic District, also known as Ashwood Avenue Historic District, in Pewee Valley, Kentucky, is a 23 acres (9.3 ha) historic district which was listed on the National Register of Historic Places in 1989. It included 13 contributing buildings.

The district includes nine houses along Ash Ave. from La Grange Rd. to Elm Ave. in Pewee Valley, specifically numbers 100, 106, 110, 111, 112, 115, 116, 117 & 121 Ash Ave. It includes Queen Anne, Bungalow/American Craftsman, and Colonial Revival architecture, built from c. 1890 to 1936.
