= Confederate Memorial Park (Marbury, Alabama) =

Park in Alabama, United States

Coordinates: 32°43′16″N 86°28′26″W

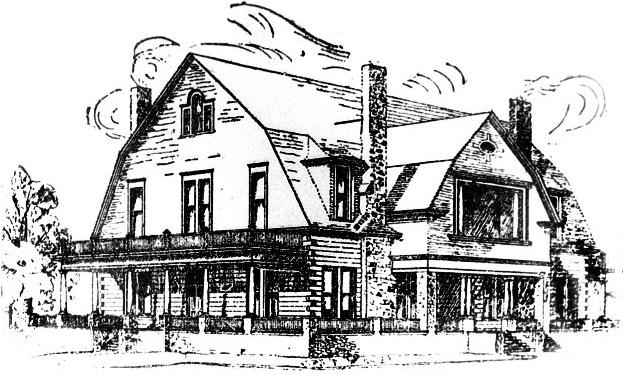
Drawing of the Alabama Confederate Soldiers Home, first published in the April 17, 1902 copy of the Blount County News-Dispatch.

Confederate Memorial Park is an Alabama State Park located in Mountain Creek, in rural Chilton County, Alabama, United States. The park's centerpiece is Alabama's only state home for Confederate soldiers. The home "operated from 1902–1939 as a haven for disabled or indigent veterans of the Confederate army, their wives, and widows." The last veteran at the facility died in 1934, and the facility closed in 1939 when "the five remaining widows were moved to Montgomery for better care".

In 1964, during the Civil War Centennial, the Alabama State Legislature established the Confederate Memorial Park, encompassing the original 102-acre site of the home, as "a shrine to the honor of Alabama's citizens of the Confederacy." In 1971, the site was placed under the Alabama Historical Commission's authority.

== History of the home ==
The home was founded in 1901 by former Confederate veteran Jefferson Manly Falkner, a lawyer from Montgomery, Alabama. Falkner wished to provide a home for former Confederate veterans and their wives and widows who could no longer support themselves, even with pensions. Initially, the home required women to have living husbands at the homes, but in 1915 the rules were changed to permit widows. He donated 80 acres (320,000 m^{2}) in 1902 for housing such residents in Mountain Creek, a summer resort area. The state government took control of the operations at the home in 1903. It was the only official home for Confederate veterans in Alabama.

The home included a small hospital, a dairy barn, a mess hall, and nine cottages, with a then-modern sewage system. At its height between 1914 and 1918, 104 veterans and nineteen widows of such veterans lived at the home. A total of 650–800 individuals lived at the home at one time or another, most from Alabama, but some had lived in other states during the war and came to Alabama after the war. The last veteran in the home died in 1934. The home closed in October 1939, moving the remaining five widows to a home in Montgomery to receive better care.

The Mountain Creek Baptist Church first met at the home in 1908, spending its first two years there. Even though the church moved out, the earliest surviving church records show many Confederate veterans still attending the church in the 1920s.

The grounds include two cemeteries, with 313 graves. A museum with relics from the war and the home is on the site. Also at the site is a Methodist church; the former Mountain Creek Post Office was located there. The home's cemetery rosters, insurance papers, and superintendent reports are available at the Alabama Dept. of Archives and History in Montgomery.

== Lost Cause, funding controversy ==
In 2018, the Anniston Star noted that visitors to the Alabama Confederate Park were greeted with the following banner: "Many have been taught the war between the states was fought by the Union to eliminate Slavery. THIS VIEW IS NOT SUPPORTED BY THE HISTORICAL EVIDENCE … The Southern States Seceded Because They Resented the Northern States Using Their Numerical Advantage in Congress to Confiscate the Wealth of the South to the Advantage of the Northern States."

The property tax that funds the Confederate Widows' Pension Fund is required under the 1901 Alabama Constitution. Despite attempts to cut funding for a memorial some find offensive, this has protected the Confederate Memorial Park from budget cuts, unlike other parks and historical sites in the state. In April 2021, during the George Floyd protests, some state lawmakers proposed allocating the same amount of money to African-American historical sites.

== See also ==
- Alabama in the American Civil War
- Confederate Memorial Park (Albany, Georgia)
- Pewee Valley Confederate Cemetery — near the site of the Kentucky Confederate Home, in Oldham County, Kentucky
