= Bluff River =

Bluff River may refer to:

- Bluff River (New Zealand)
- Bluff River (New South Wales), Australia
- Bluff River (Murchison River), a river of Tasmania
- Bluff River (Prosser River), Tasmania; see Levendale, Tasmania

== See also ==
- River Bluff (disambiguation)
