= Park Lake, Kentucky =

- Neighborhood
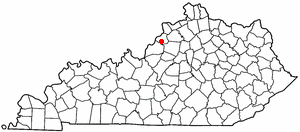
- Location of Park Lake, Kentucky
- Coordinates: 38°20′43″N 85°28′28″W
- Country: United States
- State: Kentucky
- County: Oldham

Area
  - Total: 0.12 sq mi (0.3 km^{2})
  - Land: 0.12 sq mi (0.3 km^{2})
  - Water: 0 sq mi (0.0 km^{2})
- Elevation: 751 ft (229 m)

Population (2000)
  - Total: 537
  - Density: 5,470/sq mi (2,112/km^{2})
- Time zone: UTC-5 (Eastern (EST))
  - Summer (DST): UTC-4 (EDT)
- FIPS code: 21-59260
- GNIS feature ID: 1669490

Park Lake is a neighborhood of the city of Crestwood in Oldham County, Kentucky, United States. The population was 537 at the 2000 census, at which time it was a separate city. Crestwood annexed Park Lake on May 1, 2006.

== Geography ==
Park Lake is located at 38°20′43″N 85°28′28″W.

According to the United States Census Bureau, the city had a total area of 0.1 square miles (0.26 km^{2}), all land.

== Demographics ==
As of the census of 2000, there were 537 people, 159 households, and 145 families residing in the city. The population density was 5,470.1 inhabitants per square mile (2,112.0/km^{2}). There were 161 housing units at an average density of 1,640.0 per square mile (633.2/km^{2}). The racial makeup of the city was 97.02% White, 0.37% Native American, 1.12% Asian, 0.74% from other races, and 0.74% from two or more races. Hispanic or Latino of any race were 0.74% of the population.

There were 159 households, out of which 67.9% had children under the age of 18 living with them, 78.6% were married couples living together, 10.7% had a female householder with no husband present, and 8.8% were non-families. 6.9% of all households were made up of individuals, and none had someone living alone who was 65 years of age or older. The average household size was 3.38 and the average family size was 3.56.

In the city the population was spread out, with 38.2% under the age of 18, 5.4% from 18 to 24, 41.5% from 25 to 44, 13.6% from 45 to 64, and 1.3% who were 65 years of age or older. The median age was 31 years. For every 100 females, there were 100.4 males. For every 100 females age 18 and over, there were 97.6 males.

The median income for a household in the city was $63,750, and the median income for a family was $64,167. Males had a median income of $50,156 versus $31,583 for females. The per capita income for the city was $21,384. None of the families and 0.6% of the population were living below the poverty line, including no under eighteens and none of those over 64.
