= The Oldham Era =

Newspaper in Oldham County, Kentucky

- Type: Weekly newspaper
- Format: Broadsheet
- Owner(s): Paxton Media Group
- Founded: 1876
- Language: English
- Headquarters: La Grange, Kentucky
- Website: oldhamera.com

The Oldham Era is a weekly newspaper published in Oldham County, Kentucky. In 2021, Landmark Media Enterprises sold the newspaper to Paxton Media Group.
