= Bondurant-Hustin House =

Historic house in Kentucky, United States

- Bondurant--Hustin House
- U.S. National Register of Historic Places
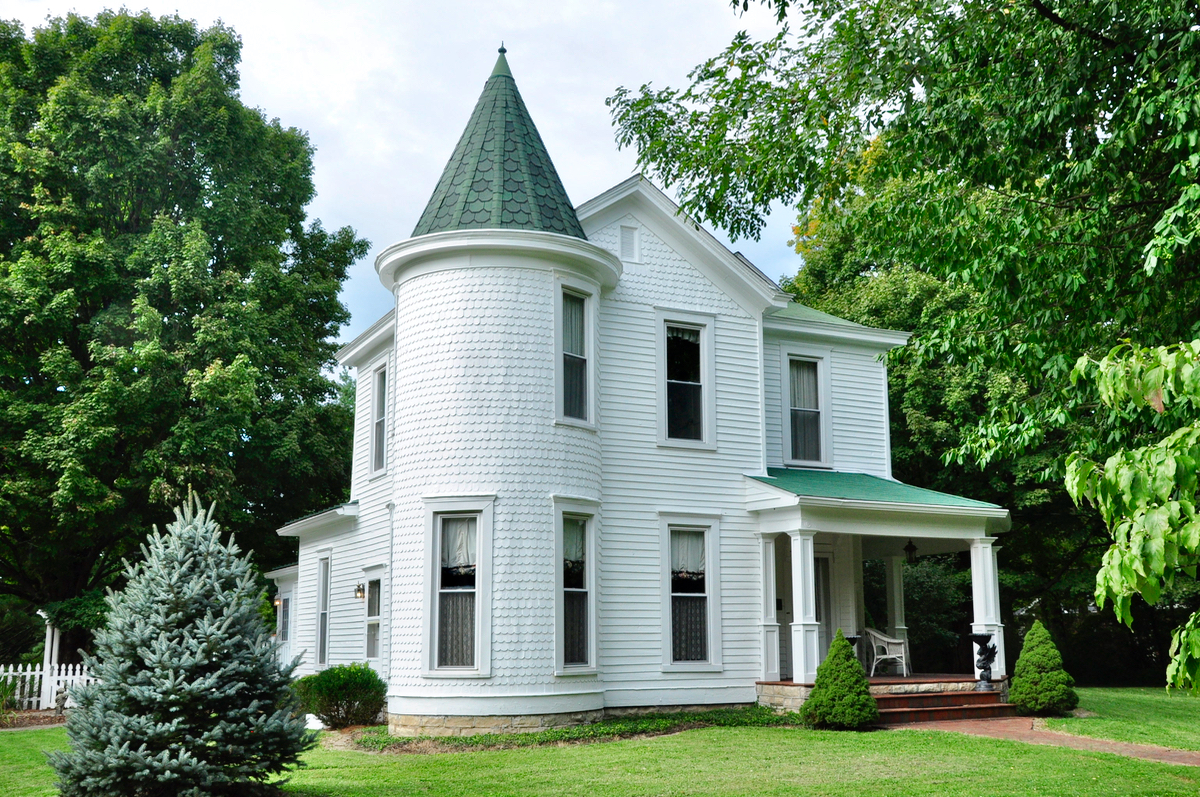

- Location within Kentucky Location within the United States
- Location: 104 Castlewood Dr., Pewee Valley, Kentucky
- Coordinates: 38°18′21″N 85°29′45″W
- Area: 4.3 acres (1.7 ha)
- Built: 1885
- Architectural style: Queen Anne
- MPS: Pewee Valley MPS
- NRHP reference No.: 89001989
- Added to NRHP: November 27, 1989

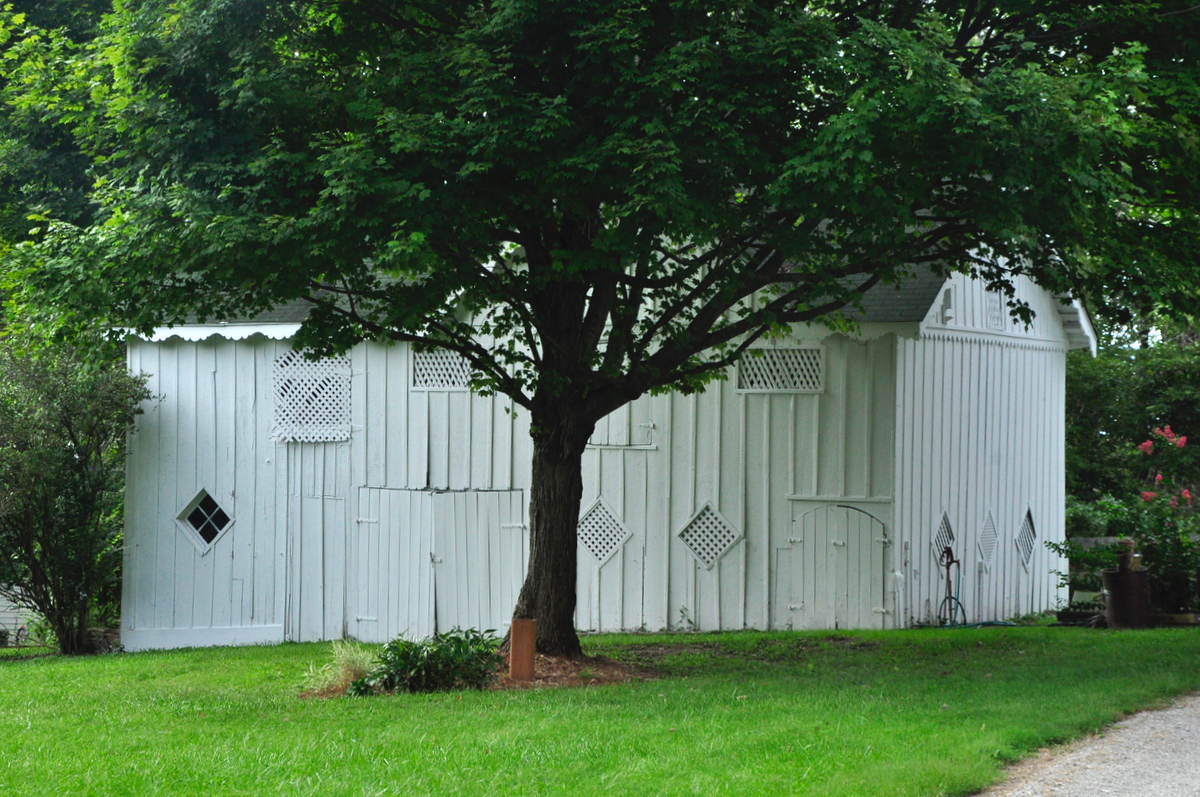
the Carriage House of the Bondurant-Hustin House in Pewee Valley, Kentucky

The Bondurant-Hustin House, located at 104 Castlewood Dr. in Pewee Valley, Kentucky, is a two-story Queen Anne-style house which was built in 1885. It was listed on the National Register of Historic Places in 1989.

It is asymmetric in plan and has a round tower with a conical roof. It has a wraparound porch with Tuscan-style columns. The property includes a carriage house which is a second contributing building in the listing.
