= McMahan House =

Historic house in Kentucky, United States

- U.S. National Register of Historic Places
- U.S. Historic district – Contributing property
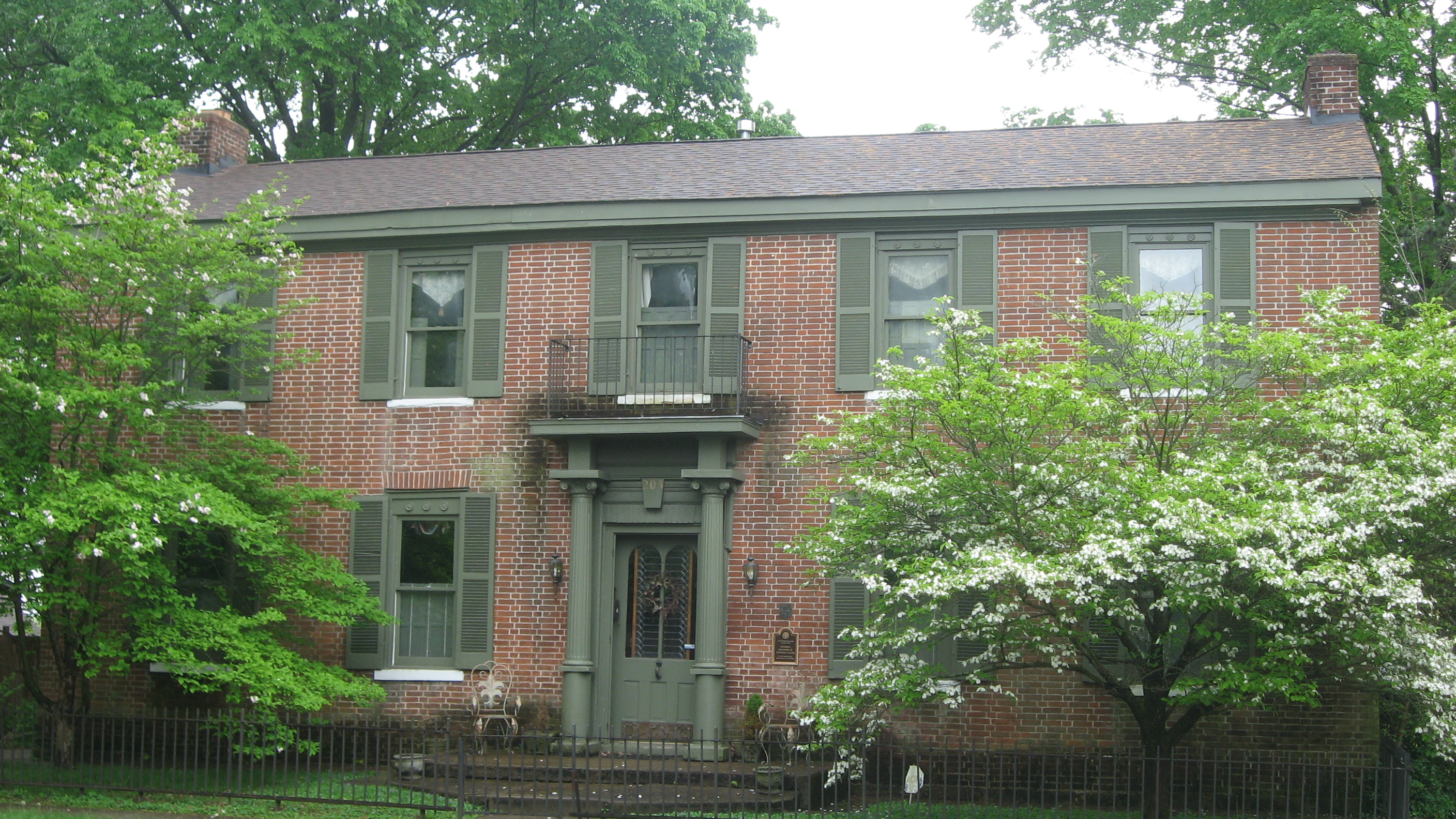

- Location within Kentucky Location within the United States
- Location: 203 Washington St., La Grange, Kentucky
- Coordinates: 38°24′24″N 85°22′37″W
- Area: 0.3 acres (0.12 ha)
- Built: c.1820
- Architectural style: I-house
- Part of: Central La Grange Historic District (ID88001316)
- NRHP reference No.: 82002741

Significant dates
- Added to NRHP: May 13, 1982
- Designated CP: September 8, 1988

The McMahan House at 203 Washington St. in La Grange, Kentucky was built in c.1820 as a brick I-house. It was listed on the National Register of Historic Places in 1982.

It is notable as "the only remaining early nineteenth century structure in LaGrange, Kentucky. As such, the five-bay brick I-house is the town's only tangible link with its early settlement and building period. The double-stretcher Flemish bond of the north facade and the remaining interior Federal moldings and mantles are evidence of the building's early construction date...."

It is a contributing building in the Central La Grange Historic District, which is also listed on the National Register.
