= Central La Grange Historic District =

Historic district in Kentucky, United States

- U.S. National Register of Historic Places
- U.S. Historic district
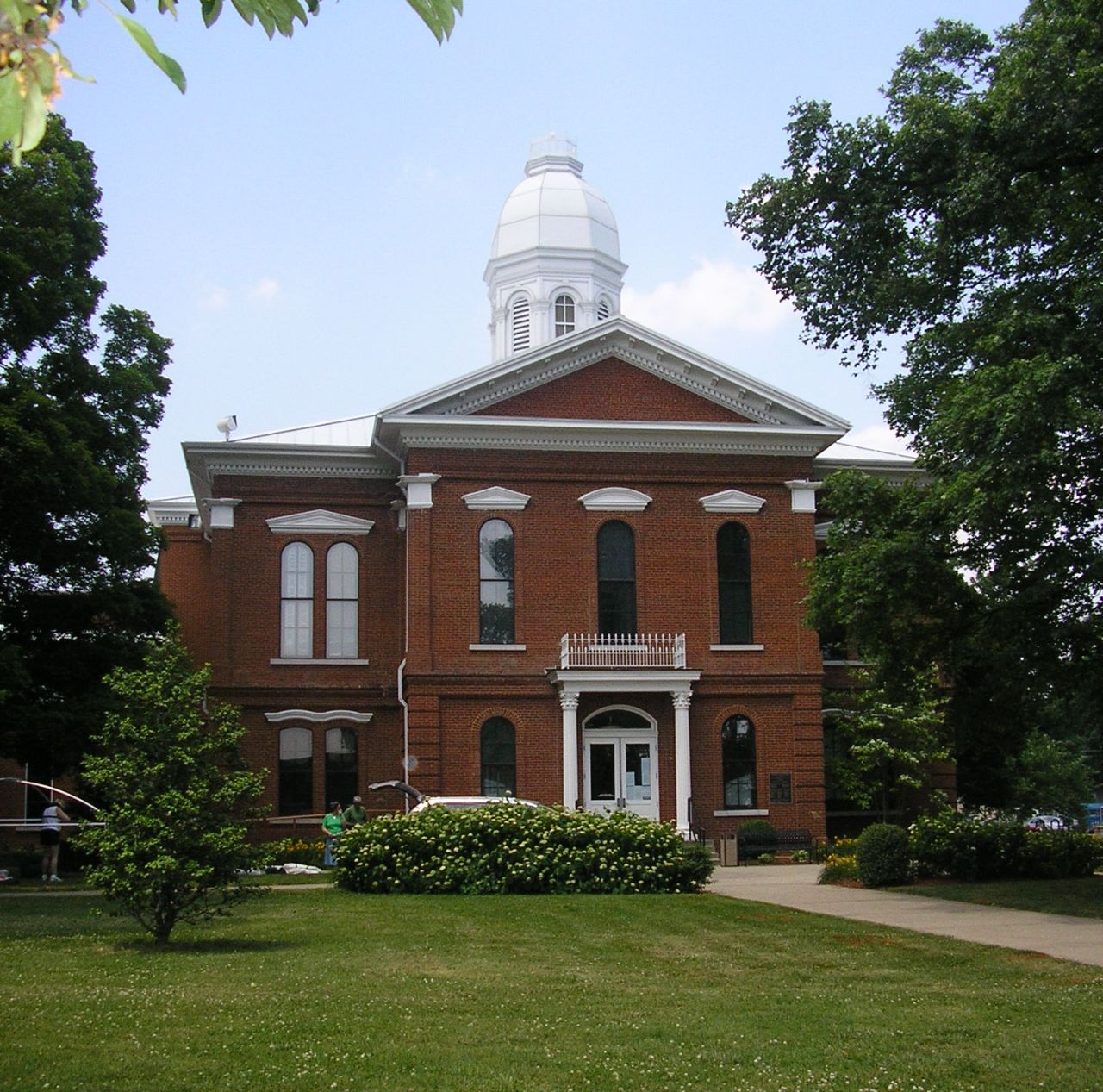
- Oldham County Courthouse

- Location within Kentucky Location within the United States
- Location: Primarily along Washington, Main, and Jefferson Sts., Kentucky Ave., and First through Sixth Aves., La Grange, Kentucky
- Coordinates: 38°24′25″N 85°22′54″W
- Area: 70 acres (28 ha)
- Built: 1838
- Architect: Wilson, Monroe Q.; Et al.
- Architectural style: Bungalow/craftsman, Late Victorian, Commercial Style
- NRHP reference No.: 88001316
- Added to NRHP: September 8, 1988

The Central La Grange Historic District in La Grange, Kentucky is a 70 acres (28 ha) historic district which was listed on the National Register of Historic Places in 1988. It runs primarily along Washington, Main, and Jefferson Sts., Kentucky Ave., and First through Sixth Aves.

It includes the Oldham County Courthouse. It includes the D.W. Griffith House and the McMahan House which are separately listed on the National Register.
