= Bondurant (surname) =

Bondurant is a surname. Notable people with the surname include:

- Amy L. Bondurant (born 1951), former U.S. Ambassador to the OECD
- Bob Bondurant (1933–2021), American race car driver
- Bourbon Bondurant (1898–1971), professional football player
- George W. BonDurant (1915–2017), American preacher
- James Bondurant (born 1978), American race car driver
- Jean Pierre Bondurant dit Cougoussac, a French Huguenot who emigrated from France in 1697 to Switzerland then on to Virginia in 1700 to escape religious persecution after Louis XIV revoked the Edict of Nantes.
- Joan Bondurant (1918–2006), American spy and scholar of nonviolence
- Matt Bondurant, American writer
