= Confederate Memorial Park (Tampa, Florida) =

Monument in Tampa, Florida, US

- Interactive map of Confederate Memorial Park
- Location: Tampa, Florida
- Coordinates: 27°59′50″N 82°19′39″W

The Confederate Memorial Park is a monument located in Tampa/Brandon, Florida. The monument, which stands close to the intersection of Interstate 4 and Interstate 75, features a large Confederate battle flag, which can be seen from the intersection.

== History ==
Confederate battle flag

The park was opened in 2008 and was funded by the Sons of Confederate Veterans. The park features a large 60-by-30-foot (18.3 by 9.1 m) Confederate battle flag, which is claimed to be the second largest Confederate flag in the world. During the anti-racist protests following the 2020 murder of George Floyd, the flag was removed after threats to burn it were made on social media.
