= Confederate Memorial Park (Albany, Georgia) =

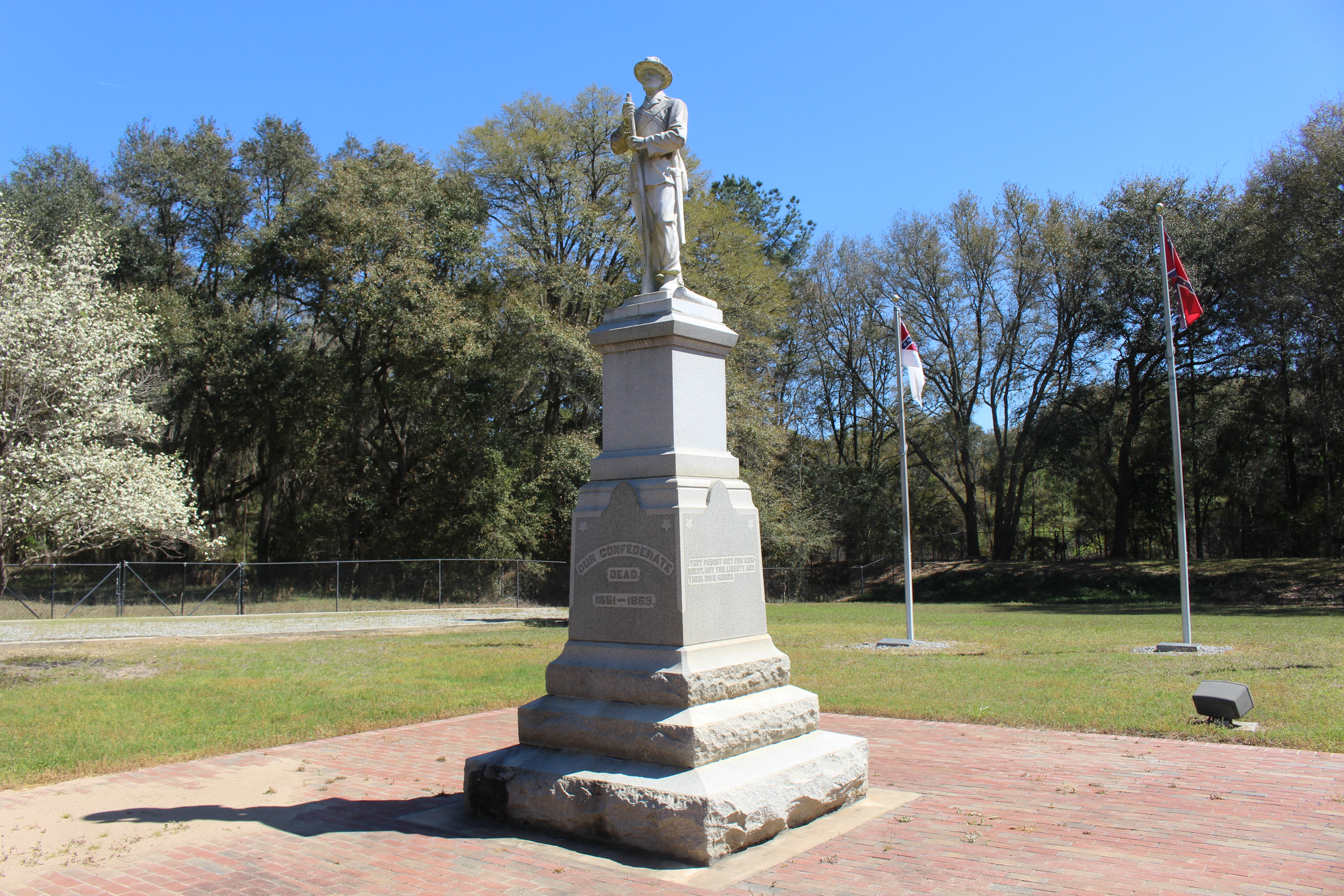
- Interactive map of Confederate Memorial Park
- Location: Albany, Georgia
- Coordinates: 31°37′21.2″N 84°07′44.0″W
- Material: Marble
- Completion date: 1901
- Dedicated to: Our Confederate Dead

The Confederate Memorial Park in Albany, Georgia, United States is located on Philema Road across from Chehaw Park.

The stone monument to Albany's Confederate veterans from the American Civil War was originally located in downtown Albany in the middle of the intersection of Jackson Street and Pine Avenue. It was moved several times, first to the grounds of the Albany Municipal Auditorium, then to Oakview Cemetery, and finally to its present location. It was rededicated on January 22, 2000.

An inscription on one side of the monument reads:

They Fought Not For Conquest, But For Liberty And Their Own Homes.

The park is owned and maintained by the Sons of Confederate Veterans and the United Daughters of the Confederacy.

== See also ==
- Confederate Memorial Day
- Confederate Memorial Park (Marbury, Alabama)
- War memorial
