= Oldham County, Kentucky =

County in Kentucky, United States

- County
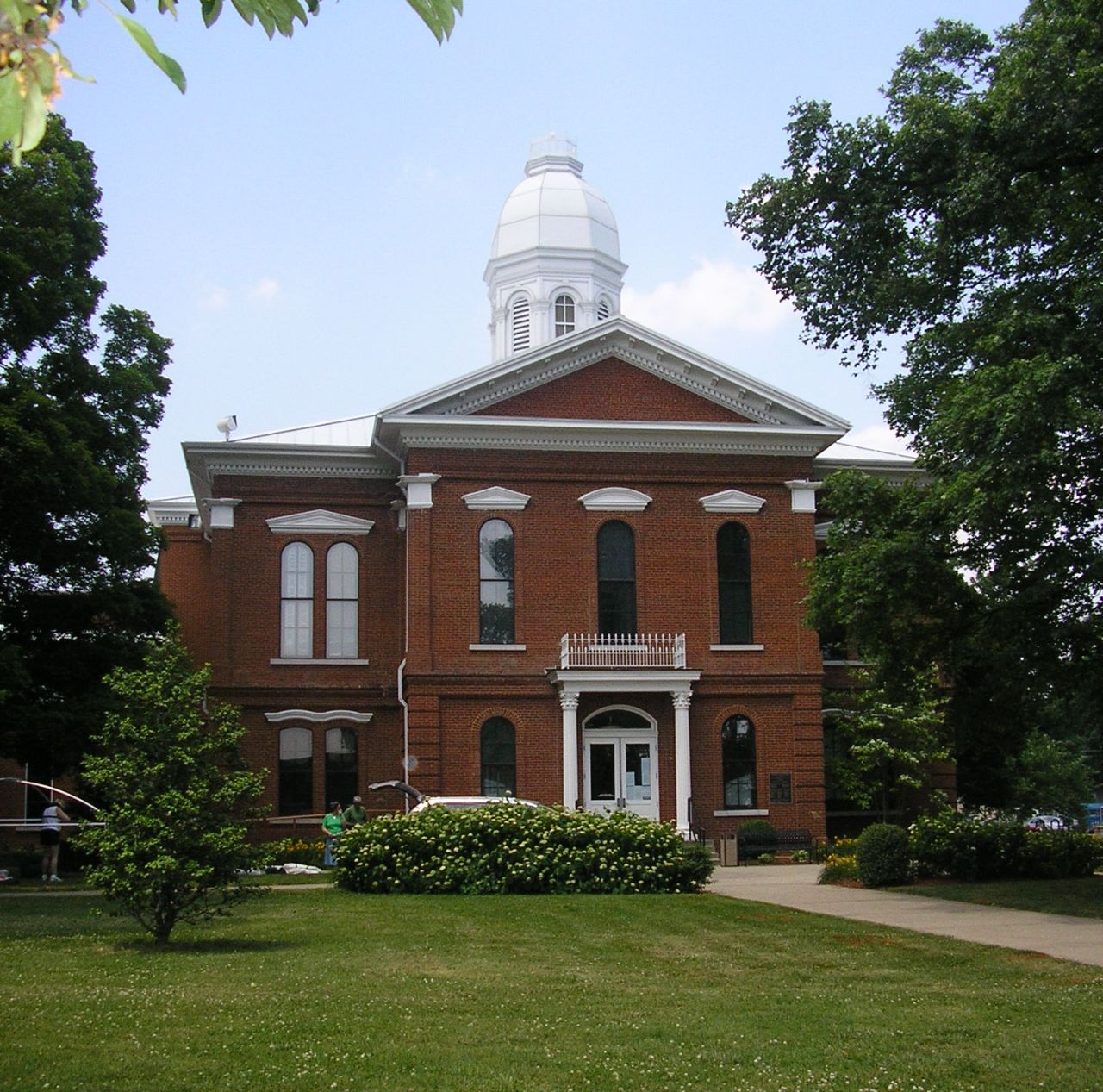
- Oldham County courthouse in La Grange

- Flag Seal

- Location within the U.S. state of Kentucky
- Coordinates: 38°24′N 85°26′W
- Country: United States
- State: Kentucky
- Founded: December 15, 1823
- Named for: William Oldham (1753–1791), American Revolutionary War colonel
- Seat: La Grange
- Largest city: La Grange

Government
  - Judge/Executive: David Voegele (R)

Area
  - Total: 196 sq mi (510 km^{2})
  - Land: 187 sq mi (480 km^{2})
  - Water: 9.2 sq mi (24 km^{2}) 4.7%

Population (2020)
  - Total: 67,607
  - Estimate (2025): 70,986 ▲
  - Density: 362/sq mi (140/km^{2})
- Time zone: UTC−5 (Eastern)
  - Summer (DST): UTC−4 (EDT)
- Congressional district: 4th
- Website: oldhamcountyky.gov

Oldham County is a county located in the north central part of the U.S. state of Kentucky. As of the 2020 census, the population was 67,607. Its county seat is La Grange. The county is named for Colonel William Oldham.

Oldham County is part of the Louisville/Jefferson County, KY–IN Metropolitan Statistical Area.

Oldham County is the wealthiest county in Kentucky and 47th-wealthiest county in the U.S. (and 37th in the U.S. by median income) and ranks as the most educated county in Kentucky. While the causes for this are complicated, areas east of Louisville have long been popular with wealthy residents, initially as summer residences and eventually as year-round suburban estates and bedroom communities. Oldham County lies northeast of the best known of these areas, Anchorage, just outside Louisville's pre-merger East End.

== History ==
Oldham County was established on December 15, 1823, from parts of Henry, Jefferson, and Shelby Counties. It was the 74th Kentucky county, and was named in honor of Col. William Oldham of Jefferson County, a Revolutionary War officer.

Initially, it was mainly a rural county with small, scattered developments in places like Westport which was founded in 1800 and served as the county seat early on. When the Louisville and Frankfort Railroad Company introduced rail lines in the area in the 1850s, many new towns and communities sprang up. Eventually the railroad ceased operating as a form of public transportation, but the more rural nature of the county continued to draw residents away from the metropolitan areas in Jefferson County. Since the early 1970s and the completion of Interstate 71, which connects Oldham County to Downtown Louisville and shopping in Eastern Jefferson County, Oldham County has increasingly become suburban in nature, a natural extension of Louisville's wealthy East End as it ran out of large tracts of undeveloped land.

== Geography ==
According to the United States Census Bureau, the county has a total area of 196 square miles (510 km^{2}), of which 187 square miles (480 km^{2}) are land and 9.2 square miles (24 km^{2}) (4.7%) are covered by water. It is the 13th-smallest county in Kentucky. The county's northern border with Indiana is formed by the Ohio River.

=== Adjacent counties ===
- Clark County, Indiana (northwest)
- Trimble County (northeast)
- Henry County (east)
- Shelby County (southeast)
- Jefferson County (southwest)

== Demographics ==
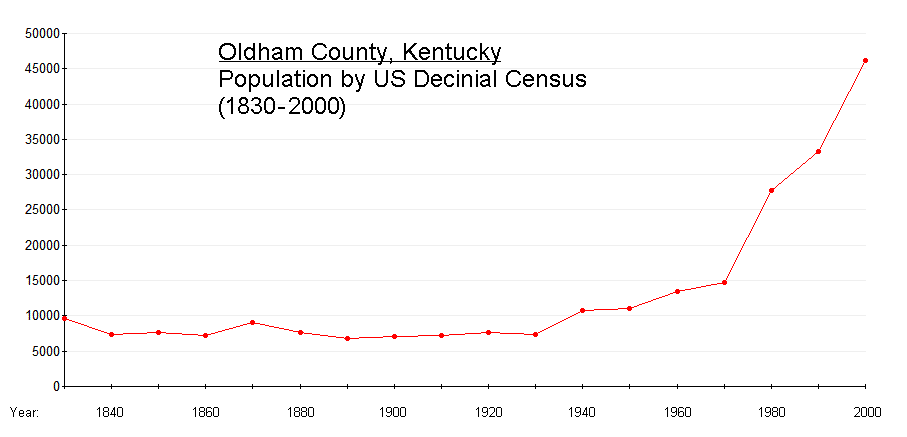
Graph of Oldham County population over time

Historical population
Census	Pop.	Note	%±
1830	9,588		—
1840	7,380		−23.0%
1850	7,629		3.4%
1860	7,283		−4.5%
1870	9,027		23.9%
1880	7,667		−15.1%
1890	6,754		−11.9%
1900	7,078		4.8%
1910	7,248		2.4%
1920	7,689		6.1%
1930	7,402		−3.7%
1940	10,716		44.8%
1950	11,018		2.8%
1960	13,388		21.5%
1970	14,687		9.7%
1980	27,795		89.2%
1990	43,455		56.3%
2000	46,178		6.3%
2010	60,316		30.6%
2020	67,607		12.1%
2025 (est.)	70,986	▲	5.0%
U.S. Decennial Census; 1790–1960 1900–1990; 1990–2000

=== 2020 census ===
As of the 2020 census, the county had a population of 67,607. The median age was 40.0 years. 26.7% of residents were under the age of 18 and 14.2% of residents were 65 years of age or older. For every 100 females there were 107.3 males, and for every 100 females age 18 and over there were 109.4 males age 18 and over.

The racial makeup of the county was 86.6% White, 3.3% Black or African American, 0.3% American Indian and Alaska Native, 1.7% Asian, 0.0% Native Hawaiian and Pacific Islander, 1.7% from some other race, and 6.3% from two or more races. Hispanic or Latino residents of any race comprised 4.8% of the population.

74.8% of residents lived in urban areas, while 25.2% lived in rural areas.

There were 22,133 households in the county, of which 42.4% had children under the age of 18 living with them and 17.7% had a female householder with no spouse or partner present. About 16.5% of all households were made up of individuals and 7.7% had someone living alone who was 65 years of age or older.

There were 23,064 housing units, of which 4.0% were vacant. Among occupied housing units, 84.8% were owner-occupied and 15.2% were renter-occupied. The homeowner vacancy rate was 1.1% and the rental vacancy rate was 5.8%.

=== 2000 census ===
As of the census of 2000, there were 46,178 people, 14,856 households, and 12,196 families residing in the county. The population density was 244 per square mile (94/km^{2}). There were 15,541 housing units at an average density of 82 per square mile (32/km^{2}). The racial makeup of the county was 93.62% White, 4.21% Black or African American, 0.21% Native American, 0.44% Asian, 0.01% Pacific Islander, 0.55% from other races, and 0.97% from two or more races. 1.30% of the population were Hispanic or Latino of any race.

There were 14,856 households, out of which 44.10% had children under the age of 18 living with them, 71.50% were married couples living together, 7.80% had a female householder with no husband present, and 17.90% were non-families. 14.90% of all households were made up of individuals, and 4.80% had someone living alone who was 65 years of age or older. The average household size was 2.85 and the average family size was 3.17.

The age distribution was 27.40% under the age of 18, 6.90% from 18 to 24, 33.10% from 25 to 44, 25.60% from 45 to 64, and 7.00% who were 65 years of age or older. The median age was 37 years. For every 100 females, there were 114.00 males. For every 100 females age 18 and over, there were 117.90 males.

The median income for a household in the county was $70,171 (2005), and the median income for a family was $70,495. Males had a median income of $46,962 versus $28,985 for females. The per capita income for the county was $25,374. About 2.90% of families and 4.10% of the population were below the poverty line, including 4.50% of those under age 18 and 6.00% of those age 65 or over. Oldham County is the most affluent county in the state of Kentucky; most residents work in Louisville and choose to live in Oldham County due to the lack of crime and the nationally recognized school system. North Oldham High School in particular, is ranked very highly among state high schools, having been named a national blue ribbon school of excellence, and ranked in the top 250 best schools in the nation through Us Weekly. 2006 classes at Oldham County High School were reported to have a teacher:student ratio of 1:15, but that number does not accurately reflect the ratio of a normal class. That number includes, for example, the small classes of five to six students in Behavioral Disorders. The published ratio also includes small classes at the County Career Center, which is located on the same campus. The actual teacher-student ratios are closer to 1:30. Regardless of population swelling and diminishing student-teacher ratios, which have led to a slight decline as of late, Oldham county is still widely recognized as the best public school system in the state.

== Communities ==
=== Cities ===
- Crestwood
- Goshen
- La Grange (county seat)
- Orchard Grass Hills
- Pewee Valley
- Prospect (mostly in Jefferson County)
- River Bluff

=== Census-designated places ===
- Buckner
- Westport

=== Other unincorporated places ===
- Ballardsville
- Brownsboro
- Centerfield
- Floydsburg
- Park Lake

== Politics ==
United States presidential election results for Oldham County, Kentucky
Year	Republican		Democratic		Third party(ies)	
Year	No.	%	No.	%	No.	%
1912	261	14.88%	1,159	66.08%	334	19.04%
1916	642	30.34%	1,455	68.76%	19	0.90%
1920	1,014	27.52%	2,655	72.07%	15	0.41%
1924	906	31.30%	1,954	67.50%	35	1.21%
1928	1,604	54.02%	1,359	45.77%	6	0.20%
1932	888	27.47%	2,319	71.73%	26	0.80%
1936	760	27.20%	2,020	72.30%	14	0.50%
1940	848	29.85%	1,983	69.80%	10	0.35%
1944	1,021	34.65%	1,908	64.74%	18	0.61%
1948	1,036	35.49%	1,703	58.34%	180	6.17%
1952	1,723	49.57%	1,735	49.91%	18	0.52%
1956	2,128	54.44%	1,769	45.25%	12	0.31%
1960	2,221	53.12%	1,960	46.88%	0	0.00%
1964	1,256	32.34%	2,622	67.51%	6	0.15%
1968	1,655	41.45%	1,399	35.04%	939	23.52%
1972	3,041	68.00%	1,311	29.32%	120	2.68%
1976	3,695	55.72%	2,819	42.51%	117	1.76%
1980	5,586	58.74%	3,487	36.67%	437	4.60%
1984	8,112	73.81%	2,857	25.99%	22	0.20%
1988	8,716	68.14%	4,025	31.46%	51	0.40%
1992	8,263	49.66%	5,457	32.80%	2,919	17.54%
1996	10,477	57.25%	6,202	33.89%	1,622	8.86%
2000	13,580	67.00%	6,236	30.77%	452	2.23%
2004	18,801	69.29%	8,080	29.78%	251	0.93%
2008	18,997	64.80%	10,000	34.11%	319	1.09%
2012	20,179	67.52%	9,240	30.92%	465	1.56%
2016	20,469	62.30%	10,268	31.25%	2,116	6.44%
2020	22,654	59.65%	14,505	38.20%	817	2.15%
2024	23,025	60.26%	14,402	37.69%	783	2.05%

The county voted "No" on 2022 Kentucky Amendment 2, an anti-abortion ballot measure, by 58% to 42%, and backed Donald Trump with 60% of the vote to Joe Biden's 38% in the 2020 presidential election.

=== Elected officials ===
Elected officials as of January 3, 2025
U.S. House	Thomas Massie (R)	KY 4
Ky. Senate	Lindsey Tichenor (R)	6
Ky. House	Jason Nemes (R)	33
Ky. House	Ken Fleming (R)	48
Ky. House	David W. Osborne (R)	59

== Education ==
It is in the Oldham County Schools. It operates North Oldham High School, Oldham County High School, and South Oldham High School.

== Notable people ==
- D. W. Griffith, highly influential film director (The Birth of a Nation, Intolerance)
- Kyra Elzy, women's collegiate basketball player and coach of Kentucky Wildcats women's basketball
- Buddy Pepper, former songwriter, pianist, composer, arranger, and actor.
- Knocked Loose, a hardcore band signed to Pure Noise Records
- Justin Thomas, a Professional golfer
- Dean Kiekhefer, MLB pitcher
- Jon Rauch, MLB pitcher
- Donta Smith, professional basketball player

== See also ==
- Louisville/Jefferson County–Elizabethtown–Madison, KY-IN Combined Statistical Area
- Moist county
- National Register of Historic Places listings in Oldham County, Kentucky
- The Oldham Era
