= Pewee Valley, Kentucky =

- City
- Location of Pewee Valley in Oldham County, Kentucky.
- Coordinates: 38°18′38″N 85°29′23″W
- Country: United States
- State: Kentucky
- County: Oldham
- Settled: 1852
- Incorporated: 1870
- Named for: a local bird

Area
  - Total: 1.94 sq mi (5.03 km^{2})
  - Land: 1.93 sq mi (5.00 km^{2})
  - Water: 0.0077 sq mi (0.02 km^{2})
- Elevation: 778 ft (237 m)

Population (2020)
  - Total: 1,588
  - Estimate (2022): 1,618
  - Density: 821.9/sq mi (317.34/km^{2})
- Time zone: UTC-5 (Eastern (EST))
  - Summer (DST): UTC-4 (EDT)
- ZIP code: 40056
- Area code: 502
- FIPS code: 21-60492
- GNIS feature ID: 2404509
- Website: www.peweevalleyky.org

Pewee Valley is a home rule-class city in Oldham County, Kentucky, United States. The population was 1,588 as of the 2020 census.

== History ==
The site of present-day Pewee Valley was first settled as a stop on the Louisville and Frankfort Railroad in 1852 under the name Smith's Station, although it remains unclear which Smith gave his name to the community. It may have been Henry S. Smith, the son of a local pioneer, or Thomas Smith, a local shopkeep. The name was changed to Pewee Valley on the establishment of a post office by Henry's son Charles Franklin Smith in 1856. The name refers to the eastern wood pewee, a local bird, but, as the town lies on a ridge, the reason for naming the settlement a "valley" remains obscure.

== Geography ==
According to the United States Census Bureau, the city has a total area of 1.9 square miles (4.9 km^{2}), all land.

== Demographics ==
Historical population
Census	Pop.	Note	%±
1890	435		—
1900	464		6.7%
1910	651		40.3%
1920	649		−0.3%
1930	582		−10.3%
1940	625		7.4%
1950	687		9.9%
1960	881		28.2%
1970	950		7.8%
1980	982		3.4%
1990	1,283		30.7%
2000	1,436		11.9%
2010	1,456		1.4%
2020	1,588		9.1%
2022 (est.)	1,618		1.9%
U.S. Decennial Census

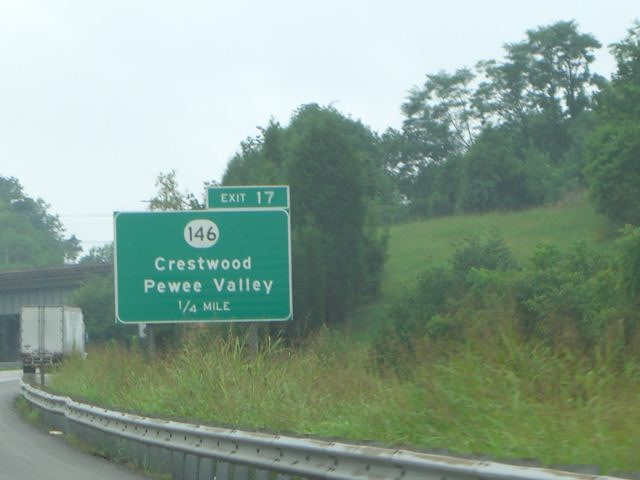
Interstate 71 exit sign for Crestwood and Pewee Valley in Kentucky.

=== 2020 census ===
As of the 2020 census, Pewee Valley had a population of 1,588. The median age was 50.0 years. 22.1% of residents were under the age of 18 and 27.3% of residents were 65 years of age or older. For every 100 females there were 92.5 males, and for every 100 females age 18 and over there were 86.3 males age 18 and over.

100.0% of residents lived in urban areas, while 0.0% lived in rural areas.

There were 528 households in Pewee Valley, of which 36.6% had children under the age of 18 living in them. Of all households, 71.8% were married-couple households, 9.1% were households with a male householder and no spouse or partner present, and 15.5% were households with a female householder and no spouse or partner present. About 14.3% of all households were made up of individuals and 8.7% had someone living alone who was 65 years of age or older.

There were 558 housing units, of which 5.4% were vacant. The homeowner vacancy rate was 0.6% and the rental vacancy rate was 17.0%.

Racial composition as of the 2020 census
Race	Number	Percent
White	1,420	89.4%
Black or African American	61	3.8%
American Indian and Alaska Native	3	0.2%
Asian	13	0.8%
Native Hawaiian and Other Pacific Islander	0	0.0%
Some other race	14	0.9%
Two or more races	77	4.8%
Hispanic or Latino (of any race)	28	1.8%

=== 2000 census ===
As of the census of 2000, there were 1,436 people, 484 households, and 394 families residing in the city. The population density was 761.8 inhabitants per square mile (294.1/km^{2}). There were 502 housing units at an average density of 266.3 per square mile (102.8/km^{2}). The racial makeup of the city was 96.10% White, 2.37% African American, 0.28% Asian, 0.56% from other races, and 0.70% from two or more races. Hispanic or Latino of any race were 2.02% of the population.

There were 484 households, out of which 33.7% had children under the age of 18 living with them, 73.3% were married couples living together, 6.4% had a female householder with no husband present, and 18.4% were non-families. 15.7% of all households were made up of individuals, and 7.9% had someone living alone who was 65 years of age or older. The average household size was 2.71 and the average family size was 3.04.

In the city, the population was spread out, with 23.6% under the age of 18, 4.9% from 18 to 24, 20.3% from 25 to 44, 31.0% from 45 to 64, and 20.2% who were 65 years of age or older. The median age was 46 years. For every 100 females, there were 87.0 males. For every 100 females age 18 and over, there were 82.5 males.

The median income for a household in the city was $71,625, and the median income for a family was $81,639. Males had a median income of $65,556 versus $33,571 for females. The per capita income for the city was $31,845. About 2.0% of families and 3.8% of the population were below the poverty line, including 6.7% of those under age 18 and 3.9% of those age 65 or over.

== Notable people ==
- Mary Lockwood Matthews, home economist at Purdue University (1882–1968)
