= Crestwood, Kentucky =

City in the United States

- City
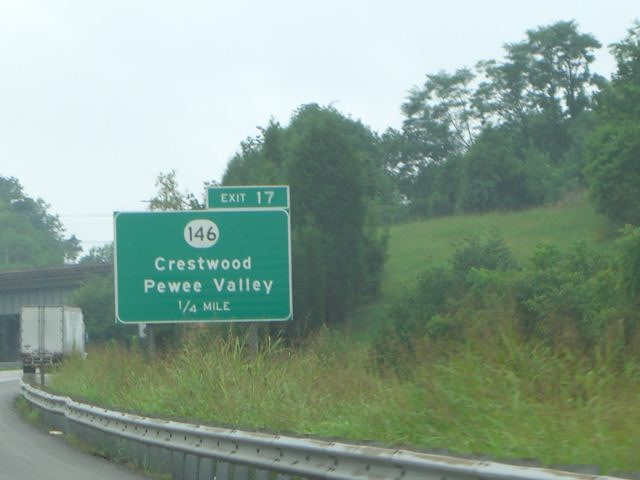
- Interstate 71 exit sign for Crestwood and Pewee Valley in Kentucky.

- Location of Crestwood in Oldham County, Kentucky.
- Coordinates: 38°19′51″N 85°28′31″W
- Country: United States
- State: Kentucky
- County: Oldham
- Founded as Beard's Station: 1857
- Renamed to Crestwood: 1909

Government
  - Mayor: Jim Kramer

Area
  - Total: 4.07 sq mi (10.55 km^{2})
  - Land: 4.05 sq mi (10.48 km^{2})
  - Water: 0.027 sq mi (0.07 km^{2})
- Elevation: 719 ft (219 m)

Population (2020)
  - Total: 6,183
  - Estimate (2024): 6,493
  - Density: 1,527.8/sq mi (589.87/km^{2})
- Time zone: UTC-5 (Eastern (EST))
  - Summer (DST): UTC-4 (EDT)
- ZIP code: 40014
- Area code: 502
- FIPS code: 21-18496
- GNIS feature ID: 2404155
- Website: https://crestwoodky.gov/

Crestwood is a home rule-class city in Oldham County, Kentucky, United States just outside Louisville's Northeast End. The population was 6,183 as of the 2020 census. CNN listed it as the 52nd best place to live in America in 2005.

The area was first settled in the early 19th century, and the town was established as Beard's Station in 1857. In 1909, the town was renamed to Crestwood.

== Geography ==
According to the United States Census Bureau, the city has a total area of 3.6 square miles (9.3 km^{2}), all land.

== Demographics ==
Historical population
Census	Pop.	Note	%±
1980	531		—
1990	1,435		170.2%
2000	1,999		39.3%
2010	4,531		126.7%
2020	6,183		36.5%
2024 (est.)	6,493		5.0%
U.S. Decennial Census

=== 2020 census ===
As of the 2020 census, Crestwood had a population of 6,183. The median age was 36.4 years. 30.8% of residents were under the age of 18 and 10.9% of residents were 65 years of age or older. For every 100 females there were 89.2 males, and for every 100 females age 18 and over there were 88.4 males age 18 and over.

99.7% of residents lived in urban areas, while 0.3% lived in rural areas.

There were 2,241 households in Crestwood, of which 46.8% had children under the age of 18 living in them. Of all households, 55.6% were married-couple households, 14.6% were households with a male householder and no spouse or partner present, and 25.1% were households with a female householder and no spouse or partner present. About 22.1% of all households were made up of individuals and 7.6% had someone living alone who was 65 years of age or older.

There were 2,330 housing units, of which 3.8% were vacant. The homeowner vacancy rate was 0.8% and the rental vacancy rate was 6.6%.

Racial composition as of the 2020 census
Race	Number	Percent
White	5,288	85.5%
Black or African American	184	3.0%
American Indian and Alaska Native	21	0.3%
Asian	109	1.8%
Native Hawaiian and Other Pacific Islander	3	0.0%
Some other race	141	2.3%
Two or more races	437	7.1%
Hispanic or Latino (of any race)	407	6.6%

=== 2000 census ===
As of the census of 2000, there were 1,999 people, 811 households, and 548 families residing in the city. The population density was 554.5 inhabitants per square mile (214.1/km^{2}). There were 860 housing units at an average density of 238.6 per square mile (92.1/km^{2}). The racial makeup of the city was 94.80% White, 2.15% African American, 0.35% Native American, 0.60% Asian, 1.10% from other races, and 1.00% from two or more races. Hispanic or Latino of any race were 3.15% of the population.

There were 811 households, out of which 33.9% had children under the age of 18 living with them, 51.5% were married couples living together, 12.9% had a female householder with no husband present, and 32.4% were non-families. 26.8% of all households were made up of individuals, and 7.4% had someone living alone who was 65 years of age or older. The average household size was 2.45 and the average family size was 3.02.

In the city, the population was spread out, with 25.9% under the age of 18, 9.0% from 18 to 24, 32.6% from 25 to 44, 23.1% from 45 to 64, and 9.5% who were 65 years of age or older. The median age was 35 years. For every 100 females, there were 89.8 males. For every 100 females age 18 and over, there were 87.9 males.

The median income for a household in the city was $42,619, and the median income for a family was $55,000. Males had a median income of $37,250 versus $23,984 for females. The per capita income for the city was $21,569. About 6.6% of families and 7.4% of the population were below the poverty line, including 7.6% of those under age 18 and 8.7% of those age 65 or over.

== Education ==
Crestwood has a lending library, South Oldham Library, a branch of the Oldham County Public Library.

Oldham County Schools has eleven public schools.

- Camden Station Elementary
- Crestwood Elementary
- Goshen Elementary
- Centerfield Elementary
- Locust Grove Elementary
- Kenwood Station Elementary
- South Oldham Middle School
- South Oldham High School
- East Oldham Middle School
- Oldham County High School
- North Oldham High School

== Parks ==
Crestwood has one park inside the city limits as of March 2021, the Maples Park

== Notable residents ==
- Mary Spencer Nay, painter and printmaker, born in Crestwood
