= Springs Station, Kentucky =

Coordinates: 38.2473°N 85.6695°W

Spring Station was a fort established sometime before 1782 around Beal's Branch of Beargrass Creek in what is now Louisville, Kentucky. It was established at the time of Louisville's founding as part of the settlement's defensive network of six forts, which protected settlers from attack by the Native Americans (commonly referred to as "Indians" at the time) who were allied with the British.

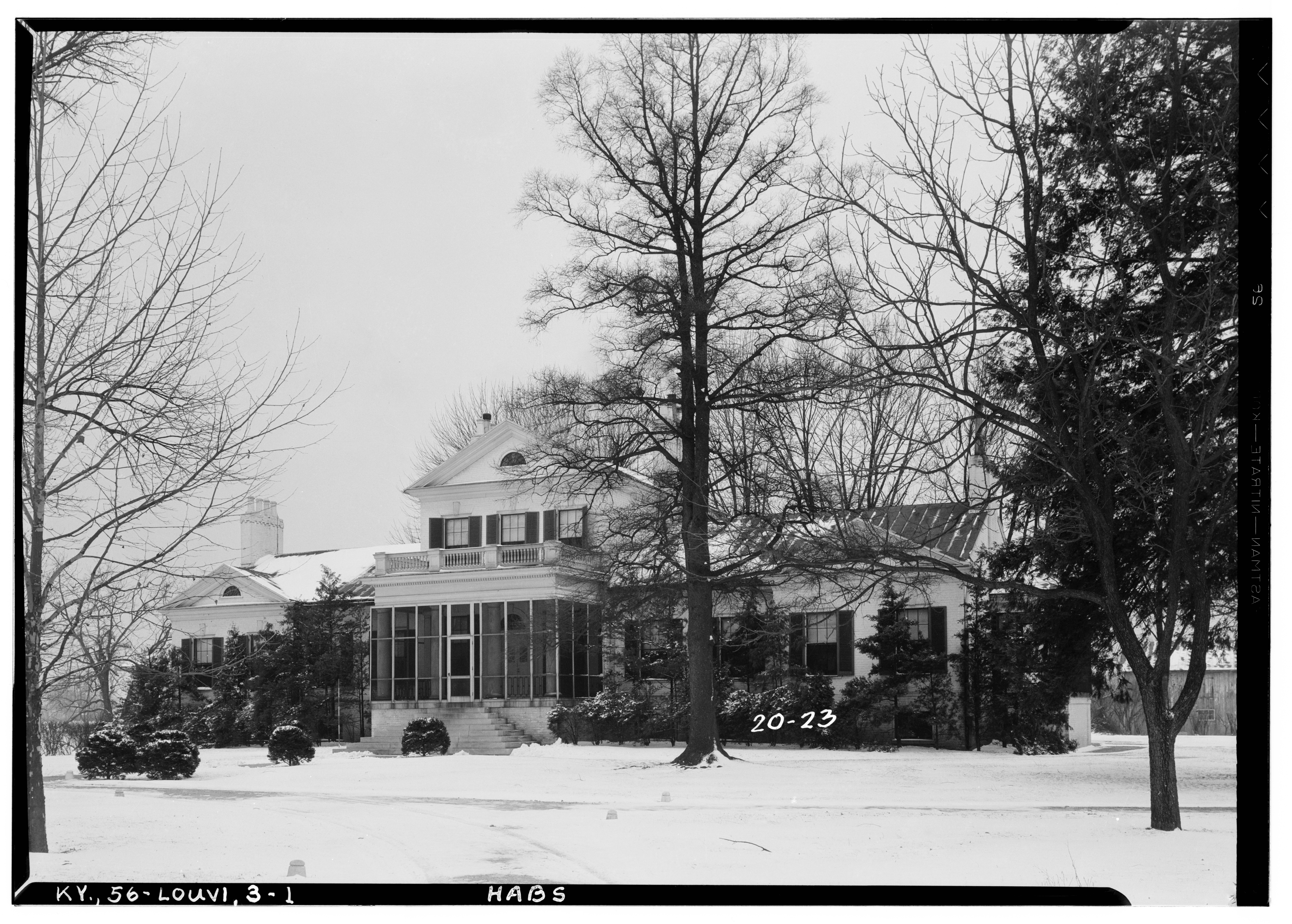

The fort at Spring Station was built by the Steele family, originally from Ireland. Richard Steele and his family emigrated to America to the town of Mercersburg, Pennsylvania. Richard Steele's children, specifically Richard Steele Jr., moved his family to Kentucky to occupy the land he had been granted for his military service in 1780. The Steeles traveled down the Ohio River in flatboats, landing on Corn Island near the Falls of the Ohio. They remained there for two years before moving to Beargrass Creek and building a fort at Spring Station. Richard and Martha Steele lived at Spring Station and had thirteen children.

Martha Steele became a pioneer heroine when she saved her wounded husband after an Indian attack at Spring Station. When the fort was attacked, Martha and the other women and children went to Floyd Station, another fort about five miles from Spring Station, where they would be safe. Tradition has it that when Martha learned that her husband, Richard Steele Jr., had been seriously injured, she wrapped her baby up and traveled alone on horseback through the wooded night back to Spring Station. She rode past the Native American encampment and up the road now known as Story Avenue. The story goes that once Martha was within calling distance of the fort, she began screaming for Richard. Upon recognizing his wife's voice, he ordered the gate to be opened just in time for her horse to run through without stopping. Martha Steele narrowly made it in time and was able to aid her husband, who ended up making a full recovery. By 1784, the Steele family moved from Spring Station to a farm in Fayette County, Lexington, Kentucky.

== Origins of the Residence ==
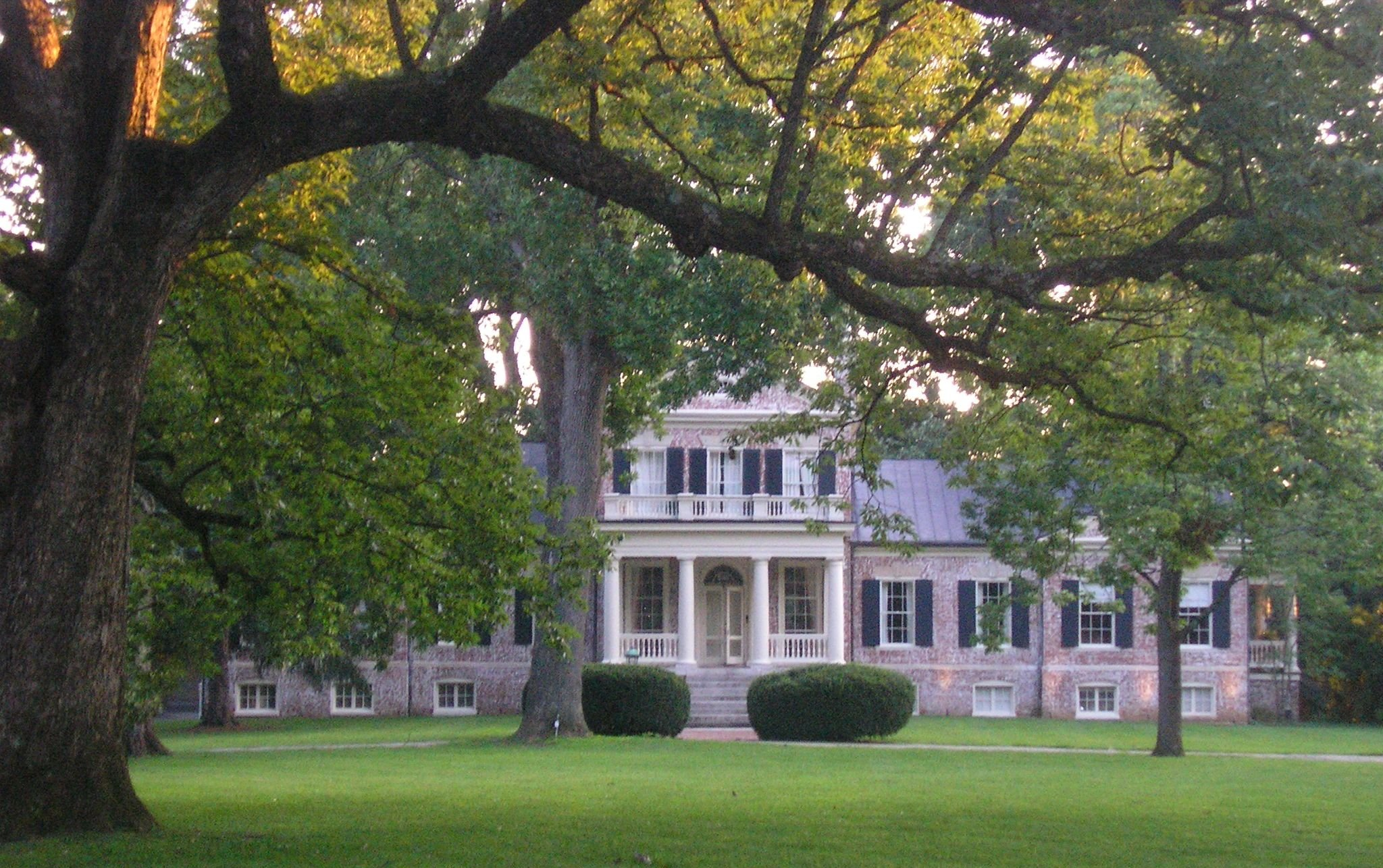

Although the house's precise origins are uncertain, the fort gave way to the dwelling known as Spring Station sometime between 1784 and 1802. There is some conflict regarding who built the house, but oral tradition has it that Thomas Jefferson gave his plans for the house to Samuel Beale (variously spelled as Beal, Beall, Beale, or Bealle), who built it in 1795. The source of this tradition comes from a letter written in 1922 by Herman D. Newcombe, who owned the house from 1906 to 1920. In the letter, Newcombe stated that John Beale from Albemarle County was a good friend of Jefferson's and patented his plans for the home. However, no record of a John Beale from Albermarle County ever coming to Kentucky suggests an unreliable account from Mr. Newcombe, whose source remains unknown.

The Kentucky Land Grants does record that Samuel Beale was granted nearly 3,000 acres in Jefferson County along Beargrass and Fern Creek on November 7, 1787. Samuel Beale's son, Norborne Beale, came to Kentucky in 1802 and settled on the part of his father's land known as Spring Station with his family. It is not certain whether Samuel Beale or his son, Norborne, built the house; however, the Beale family certainly played a significant part in the origins of the residence at Spring Station.

== See also ==
- Corn Island (Kentucky)
- Fort Nelson (Kentucky)
- Fort-on-Shore
- Fort William (Kentucky)
- Floyd's Station (Kentucky)
- Low Dutch Station
- Bryan's Station
- Station (frontier defensive structure)
