= Low Dutch Station =

Coordinates: 38°14′29″N 85°38′08″W

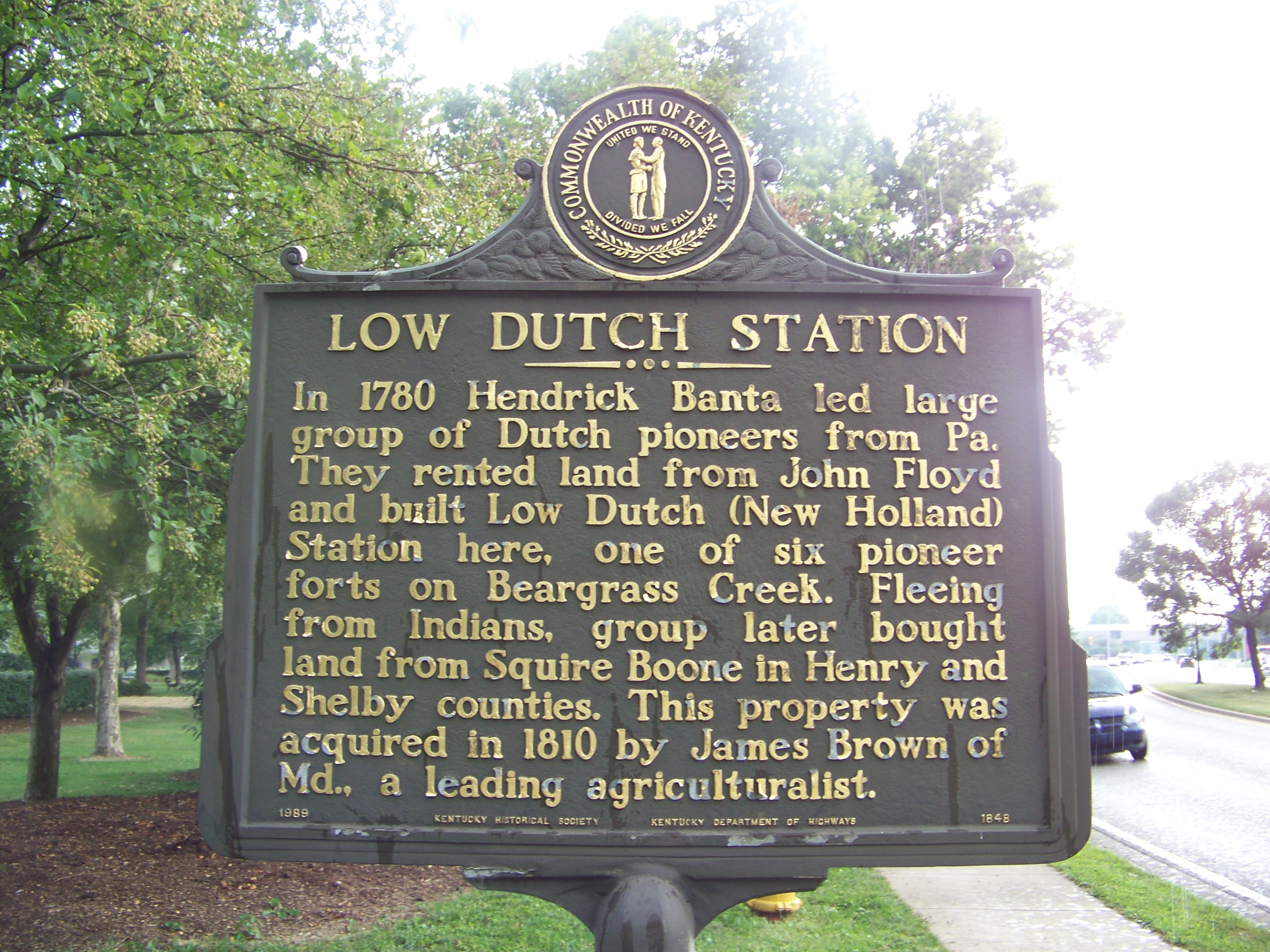
Low Dutch Station historical marker, on Kresge Way looking west toward the Emergency Entrance of Baptist East Hospital

Low Dutch Station was established in 1780 on the middle fork of Beargrass Creek in Kentucky. This station was settled by Dutch pioneers from Pennsylvania and was also known as New Holland Station. The station was one of a group of seven forts established on Beargrass Creek during this period in this area that is now a part of Louisville. The leader of the group was Hendrick Banta. The group of settlers were a part of the "Low Dutch Company" and had their own bylaws, a formal charter, and accounting procedures. The group had as its purpose the preservation of the language, culture and religion of the Dutch. The Dutch traveled from a settlement near Harrodsburg to Low Dutch Station.

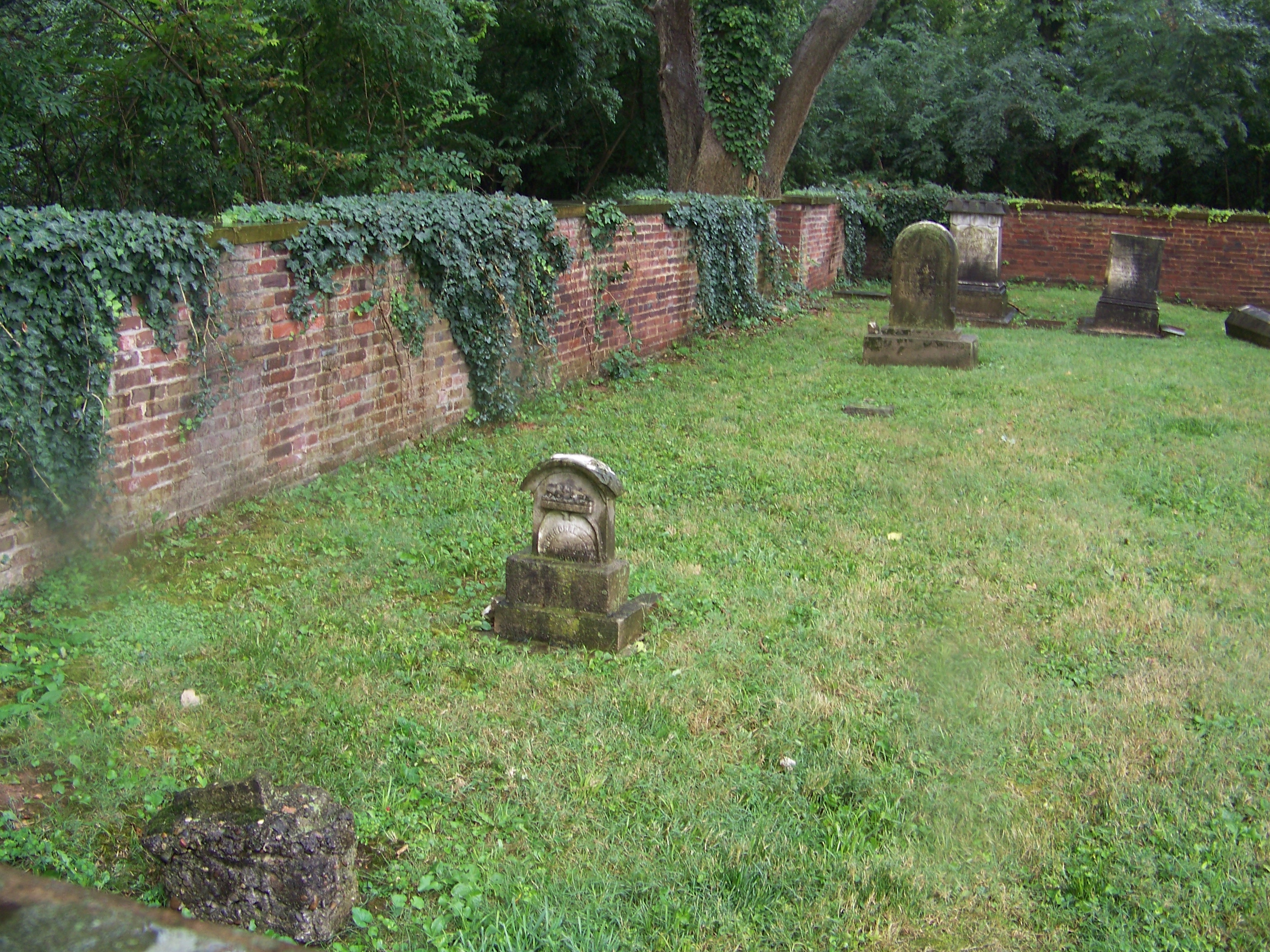
The historic Brown Family Cemetery is in the southeast corner of Brown Park, about 1400 ft. southeast of the historical marker for Low Dutch Station; the primary families represented by the old tombstones are Brown, Forman, Galt, Lawrence, & Pope, along with single stones each for Anderson & Hobbs, and two infants of the Nicholas family.

There is no connection between Low Dutch Station or its settlers and the nearby road known as Dutchmans Lane in St. Matthews. The aforementioned Dutchmans Lane was originally named Deutschman's Lane, taking its name from the fact that it was the access road from Taylorsville Road to the farm owned and operated by Louis J. Hollenbach Sr., a prominent German-American businessman in early 20th-century Louisville. Anti-German sentiment in Louisville during World War I prompted the shortening of the name from Deutschman (lit. "German man") to Dutchman.

The bronze plaque historical marker for Low Dutch Station is located on the south side of Kresge Way, about 200 ft. east/northeast of the traffic light intersection where Browns Lane & Baptist Hospital East Emergency Entrance crosses Kresge Way. It could also be described as being 200 ft. east of the northwest corner of Brown Park, and the marker actually is at the edge of Brown Park, next to the road and sidewalk right-of-way. This marker and its post had been missing for some time, and has since been replaced with a new marker with a slightly different wording, counting it as one of "seven" pioneer forts along Beargrass Creek instead of the previously worded "six". The new marker also eliminated references to "Indians" and the Dutch settlers moving to Henry and Shelby Counties and buying land there from Squire Boone.

The text of the new marker reads as follows:

In 1780 Hendrick Banta led a large group of Dutch settlers down the Ohio River to the Falls of the Ohio from Pennsylvania. They rented land from John Floyd and built Low Dutch (New Holland) Station, one of seven forts on Beargrass Creek. In 1810, leading agriculturalist James Brown of Maryland, acquired the property.

== See also ==
- Corn Island (Kentucky)
- Fort Nelson (Kentucky)
- Fort-on-Shore
- Fort William (Kentucky)
- Spring Station (Kentucky)
- Floyd's Station (Kentucky)
- Bryan's Station
- Long Run Massacre
- Shippingport, Kentucky
- Westervelt Massacre
