= Station (frontier defensive structure) =

Defensible residence on the American frontier

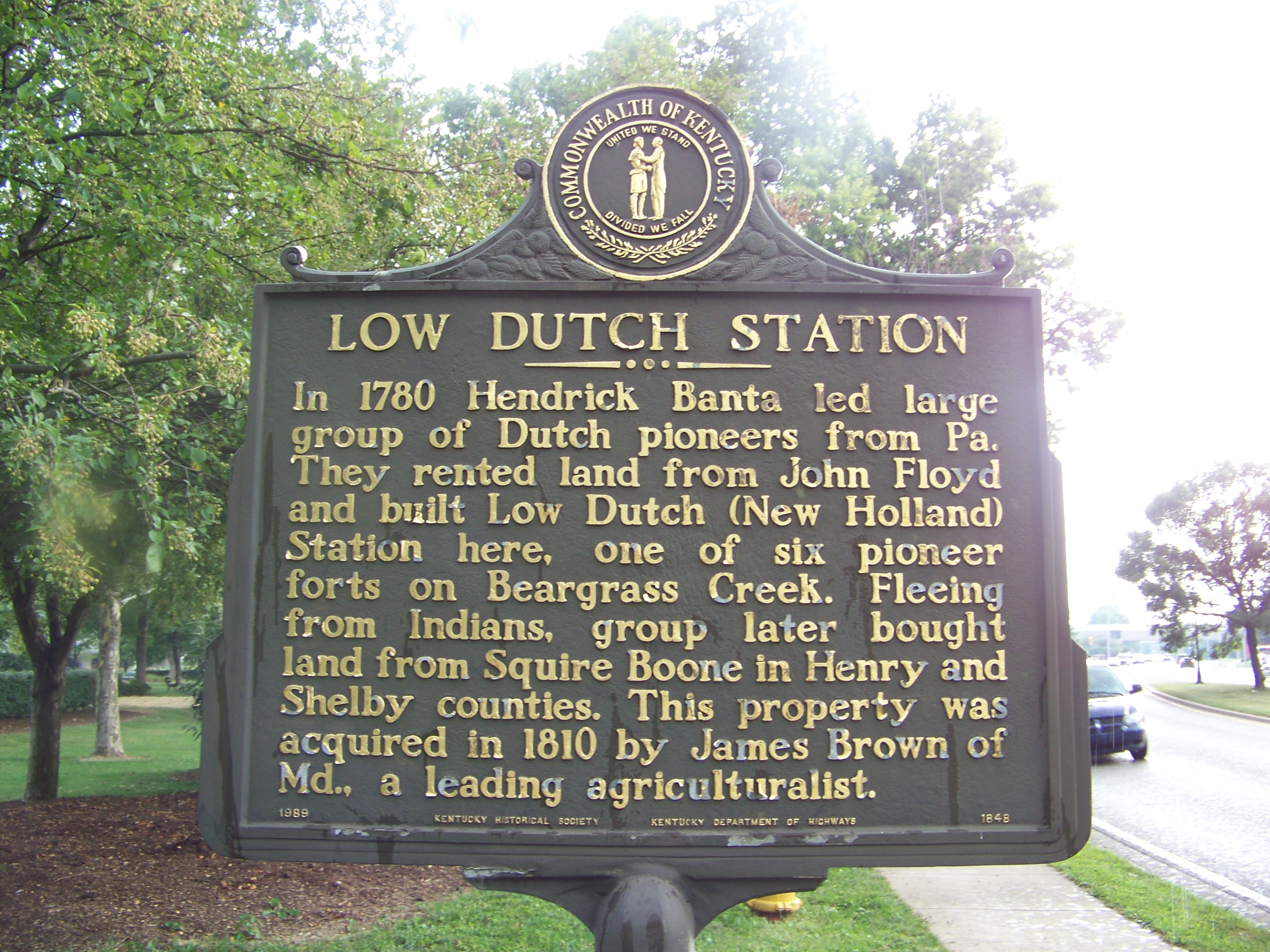
Low Dutch Station historical marker

A station was a defensible residence constructed on the American frontier during the late 18th and early 19th century.

Many of these structures were built on the Kentucky frontier during the struggle with the British and Native Americans. According to Virginia law, settled land had to be surveyed, a corn crop planted and a dwelling built. On the frontier, this building had to be fortified.

The home, often called a station, but could be called a fort in other regions, was usually built of logs and were supplied only while hostilities were continuing. Families often maintained a station and visitors were always welcome, since in numbers there was strength. Veterans were given land grants after the American Revolution, and many built a station to secure the area.

The purpose for stations in Kentucky was for protection, since most Native Americans at the time supported the British and often attacked the settlers.

== See also ==
- Columbia and Fort Miami (Ohio)
- Corn Island (Kentucky)
- Covalt Station - Bethany Town (Ohio)
- Dunlap's Station (Ohio)
- Fort Nelson (Kentucky)
- Fort-on-Shore
- Fort William (Kentucky)
- Spring Station, Kentucky
- Floyd's Station, Kentucky
- Bryan's Station, Kentucky
