= Floyd's Station, Kentucky =

Stockade in frontier Kentucky

Floyd's Station was a fort on Beargrass Creek in what is now St. Matthews, Kentucky. In November 1779 James John Floyd built cabins and a stockade near what is now Breckenridge Lane. In 1783, John Floyd, future Governor of Virginia was born in the Station. The pioneer's father was killed by Indians twelve days before the birth of his son. The station was one of six on Beargrass Creek and was involved in local conflict with Native Americans in the area for the next five years. All that remain today of Floyd's Station are a spring house and cemetery.

== Gallery ==
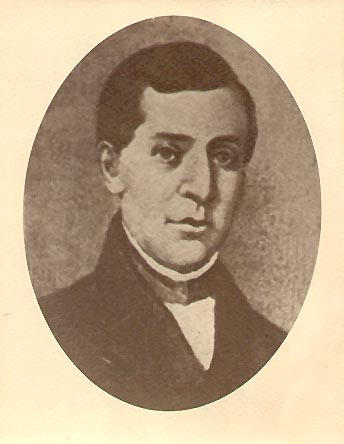
James John Floyd

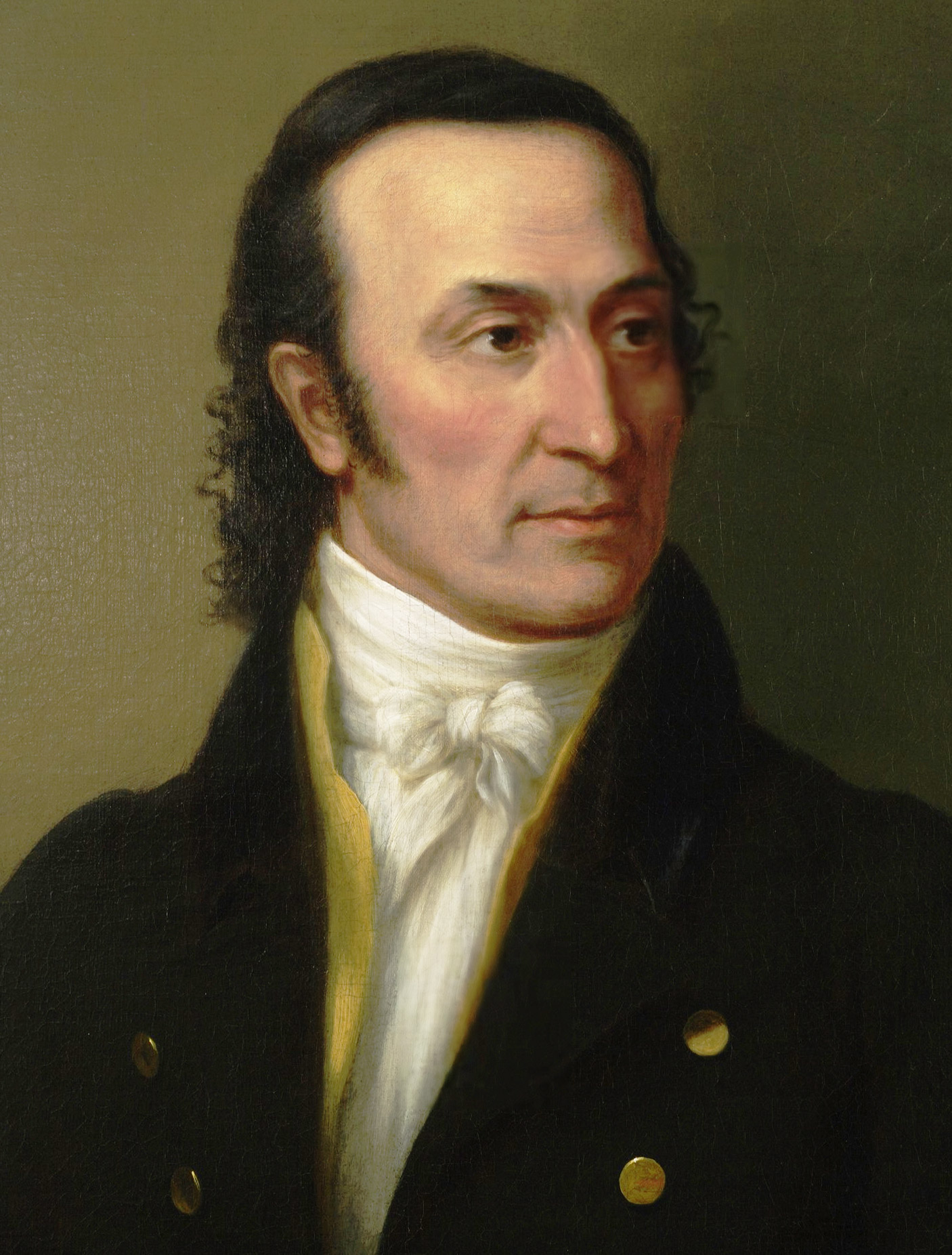
John Floyd

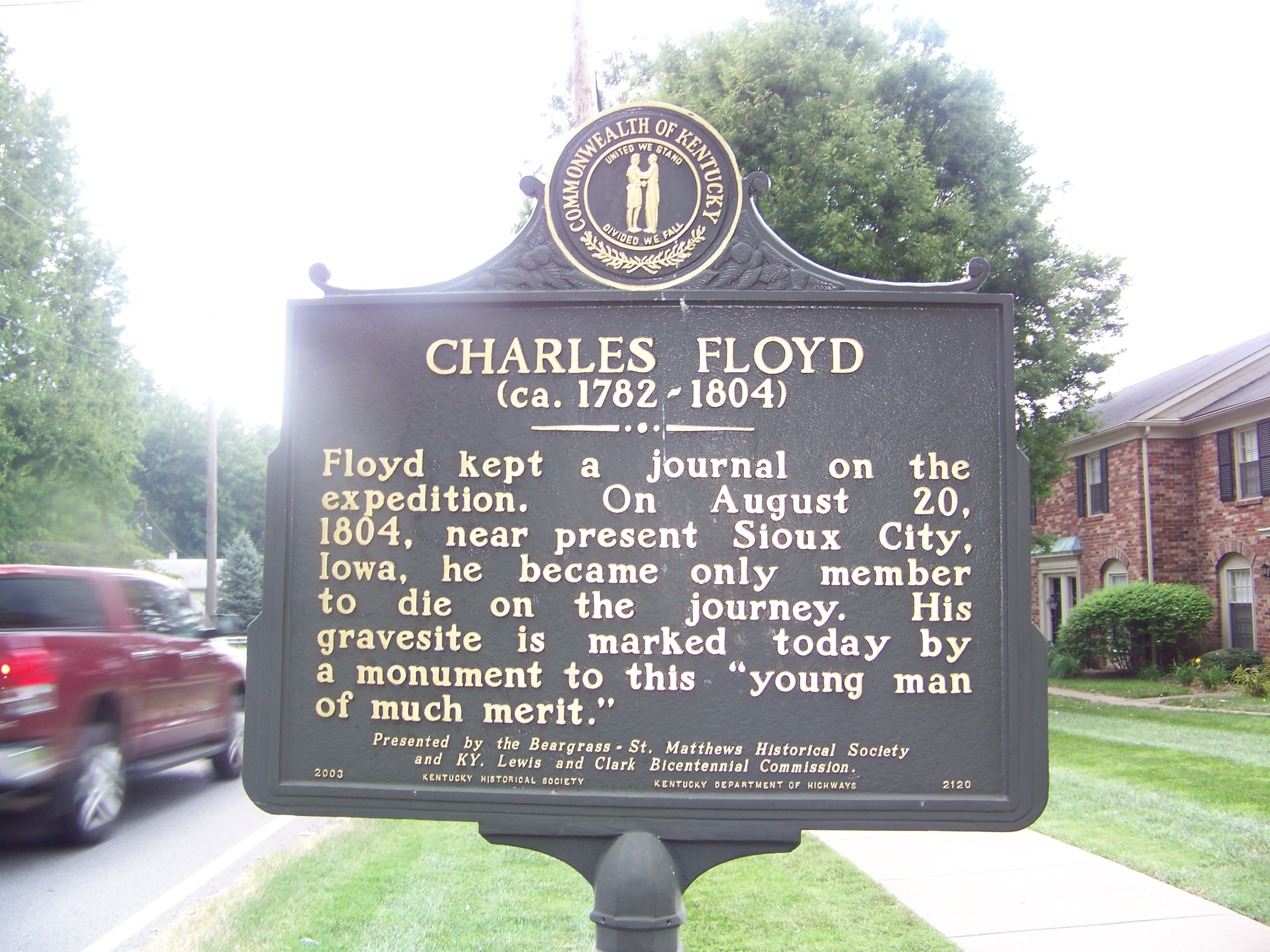
Charles Floyd

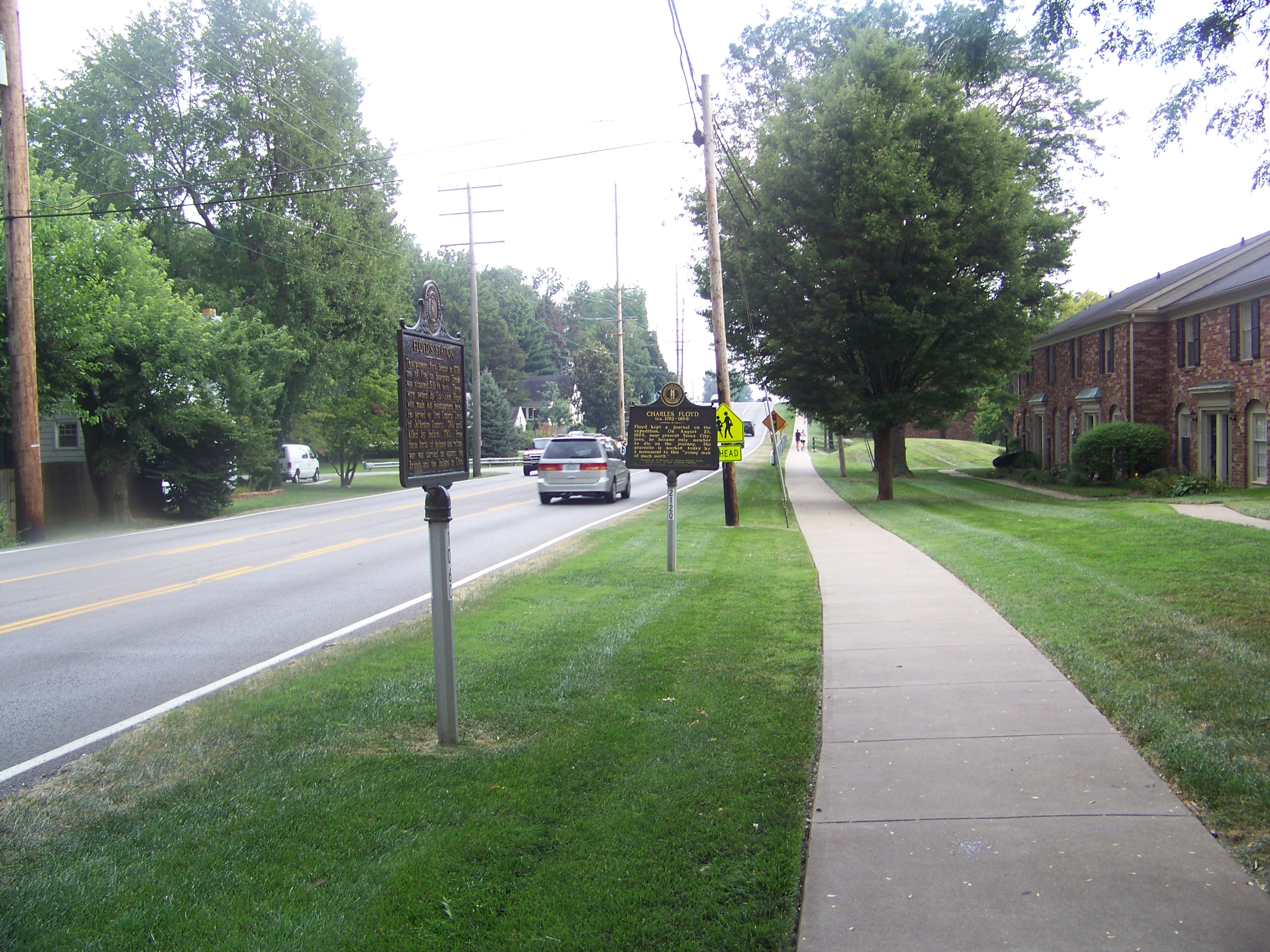
2008 Area Scene

== See also ==
- Corn Island (Kentucky)
- Fort Nelson (Kentucky)
- Fort-on-Shore
- Fort William (Kentucky)
- Spring Station (Kentucky)
- Low Dutch Station
- Bryan's Station
- Station (frontier defensive structure)
