= John Floyd (Virginia politician) =

American politician and military officer (1783–1837)

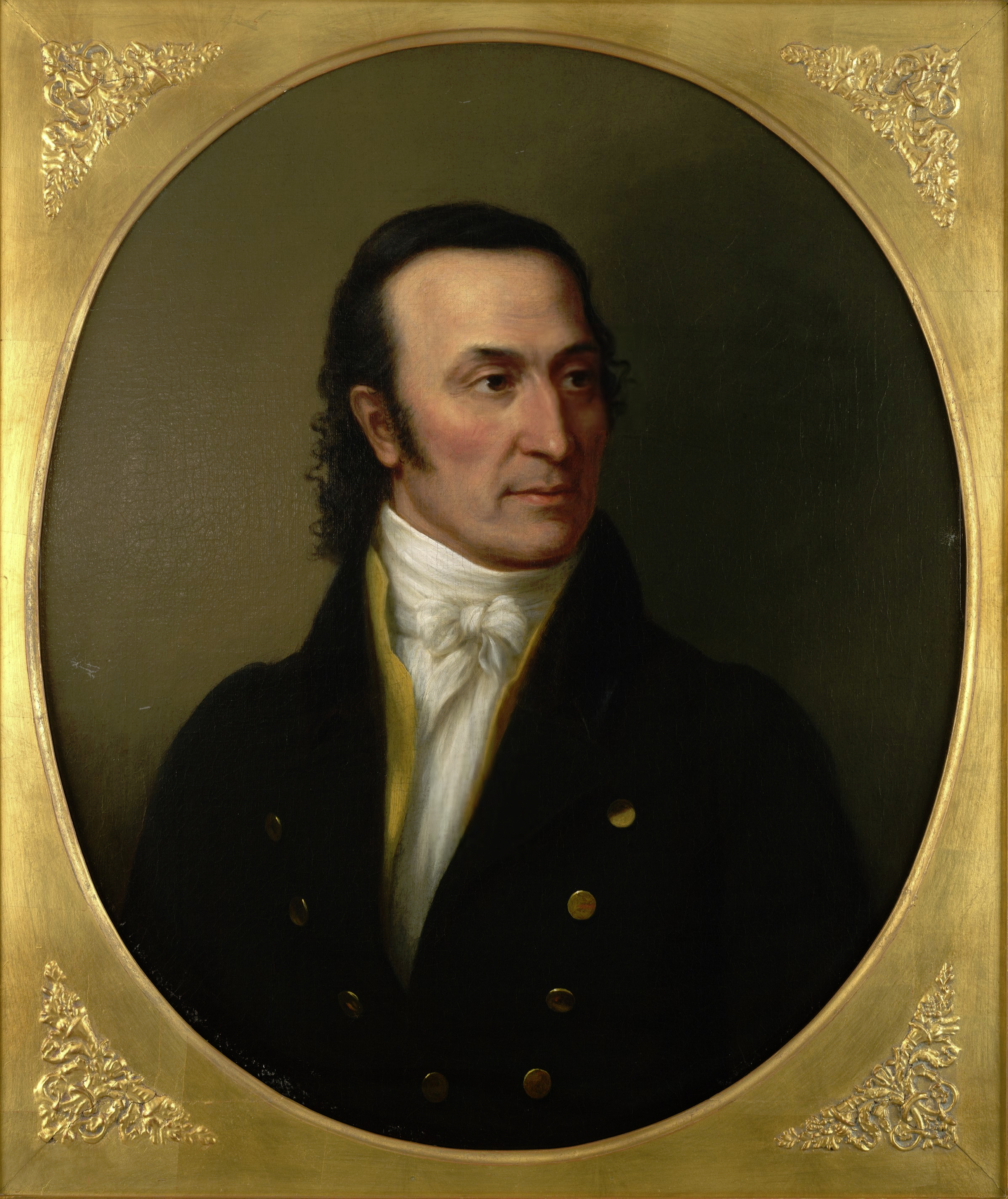

25th Governor of Virginia
- In office March 4, 1830 – March 31, 1834
- Preceded by: William Branch Giles
- Succeeded by: Littleton Waller Tazewell

Member of the U.S. House of Representatives from Virginia
- In office March 4, 1823 – March 3, 1829
- Preceded by: Arthur Smith
- Succeeded by: Robert Craig
- Constituency: 20th district
- In office March 4, 1817 – March 4, 1823
- Preceded by: James Breckinridge
- Succeeded by: John Randolph
- Constituency: 5th district

Member of the Virginia House of Delegates from Montgomery County
- In office October 10, 1814 – January 19, 1815 Serving with Thomas McHenry
- Preceded by: Thomas Goodson
- Succeeded by: John Ingles

Personal details
- Born: April 24, 1783 Floyd's Station, Virginia, U.S. (now Jefferson County, Kentucky)
- Died: August 17, 1837 (aged 54) near Sweet Springs, Virginia, U.S. (now West Virginia)
- Party: Democratic-Republican (before 1828); Nullifier (1828–1829); Democratic (1829–1837)
- Children: 10, including John and George
- Parent: John Floyd
- Education: Dickinson College (attended); University of Pennsylvania (MD)

Military service
- Allegiance: United States
- Branch/service: Virginia Militia; United States Army
- Years of service: 1807–1814
- Rank: Brigadier General
- Battles/wars: War of 1812

John Floyd (April 24, 1783 – August 17, 1837) was an American politician and military officer. He represented Virginia in the United States House of Representatives and later served as the 25th governor of Virginia.

During his career in the House of Representatives, Floyd advocated for settling the Oregon Country, unsuccessfully arguing on its behalf from 1820 until he left Congress in 1829; the area did not become a territory of the United States until 1848.

During the 1832 presidential election, Floyd was selected by John C. Calhoun to serve as the Nullifier Party's candidate. The state legislature of South Carolina voted to give the state's eleven electoral votes to Floyd. While governor of Virginia, Nat Turner's Rebellion occurred. Although Floyd was an outspoken advocate for state's rights, he supported the gradual abolition of slavery on account of its inefficiency. His term as governor oversaw a period of economic prosperity for the state.

== Family and early life ==
Floyd was born at Floyds Station, Virginia, near what is now Louisville, Kentucky. His parents were pioneer John Floyd, who Native Americans killed twelve days before his son's birth, and Jane Buchanan. His first cousin was Charles Floyd, the only member of the Lewis and Clark Expedition to die. In a letter dated 15 December 1830, Sam Houston stated that Floyd was the first cousin of another member of the expedition, Nathaniel Pryor.

Floyd was educated at home and a nearby log schoolhouse before enrolling in Dickinson College in Carlisle, Pennsylvania at the age of thirteen. He became a member of the Union Philosophical Society in 1797. Although he enrolled in the class of 1798, he had to withdraw due to financial troubles. His guardian had failed in his payments, and family accounts relate Floyd was so poor that "he was obliged to borrow a pair of panteloons from a boatman" to return to his home in Kentucky.

When his step-father, Alexander Breckinridge, died in 1801, he could return but had to withdraw again due to a lung illness. He moved to Philadelphia and was placed under the care of Dr. Benjamin Rush, an experience that influenced his decision to pursue a medical career. After an apprenticeship in Louisville, Kentucky, Floyd enrolled in the medical department of the University of Pennsylvania in Philadelphia in 1804 and became an honorary member of the Philadelphia Medical Society and a member of the Philadelphia Medical Lyceum. Floyd graduated in 1806, and his graduating dissertation was entitled An Enquiry into the Medical Properties of the Magnolia Tripetala and Magnolia Acuminata. He moved to Lexington, Virginia and then to the town of Christiansburg, Virginia. Floyd also served as a Justice of the Peace in 1807. In 1810, he was recorded as owning four slaves in Christiansburg.

In 1804, Floyd married Letitia Preston, who came from a prominent southwest Virginian family. She was the daughter of William Preston and Susannah Smith and sister of Francis Preston, of Abingdon, Washington County, Virginia. They had 12 children, including:

- John Buchanan Floyd (1806–1863), Governor of Virginia and Secretary of War under President Buchanan.
- Nicketti Buchanan Floyd, married United States Senator John Warfield Johnston.
- George Rogers Clark Floyd (1810–1895), Secretary of Wisconsin Territory and later a member of the West Virginia Legislature
- Eliza Lavalette Floyd, married professor George Frederick Holmes

Floyd was a surgeon with the rank of major in the Virginia State Militia from 1807 to 1812. At the outbreak of the War of 1812, Floyd moved his family to a new home near present-day Virginia Tech to be near friends and entered the regular army. On July 13, 1813, he was appointed surgeon of Lt. Col. James McDowell's Flying Camp in the Virginia militia. When he returned from a leave of absence, he discovered someone else had been appointed to replace him, so his service in this role ended on November 16, 1813. Floyd was then commissioned as major of the militia on April 20, 1814, and was promoted to the rank of brigadier general of the 17th Brigade of Virginia militia. He served until he was elected to the Virginia House of Delegates in 1814. During this time, he moved his family again, this time to Thorn Spring, a large plantation in Montgomery County, Virginia. Thornspring (Pulaski) (now Thornspring Golf Course) was inherited by Letitia Preston Floyd from her father William Preston and was located near her older brother, Virginia Treasurer, Gen John Preston, and his Horseshoe Bottoms Plantation (now the site of the Radford Army Ammunition Plant). They both were near Preston's home at Smithfield plantation (now the campus of Virginia Tech) that their father had completed in Montgomery county for their mother, Susannah Smith Preston, before he died. John Floyd used to keep Bears chained to the tree on the lawns of the Thornspring Plantation (Pulaski, Virginia).

== Political career ==
From 1814 to 1815, Floyd was a member of the Virginia House of Delegates and established a record as a strong nationalist. He supported a joint resolution to coordinate Virginia's defense with the Federal government as opposed to the contending resolution to "authorize the governor to 'communicate' with the 'Government of the United States'". In addition, Floyd supported a bill that authorized Virginia to raise troops and place them at the federal government's order, as well as supporting a resolution to condemn the terms of peace proposed by the British commissioners at Ghent. He was also an opponent of the tactics of the Federalist leader, Charles F. Mercer, who questioned whether the United States was a sovereign country.

In 1816, Floyd was elected as a Democratic-Republican to the United States House of Representatives and served from March 4, 1817, to March 3, 1829. When Henry Clay's proposition to send a minister to Buenos Aires and therefore recognize Argentina in its bid for independence from Spain, Floyd was in support and urged recognition as a matter of national self-interest and justice. As Floyd's biographer noted:

This proposed recognition meant more to Floyd even than trade advantages and justice; it was another step in the disenthrallment of America. It would afford relief from that political plexus that had made it impossible for one European nation to move, even in matters relating to America, without creating a corresponding movement in each of the others. He was tired of negotiating the things which related exclusively to America in London, Paris, and Madrid.

When General Andrew Jackson tried and executed two British agents during the First Seminole War in Spanish-held Florida, it precipitated the Great Seminole Debate of 1818–1819 in Congress, with some claiming he exceeded his orders from President James Monroe and demanding his censure. Floyd, however, supported Jackson's actions, maintaining he had acted according to precedent and his orders. He also denied the sovereignty of the Seminole tribe.

When Missouri sought statehood in 1820, it sparked a heated debate that eventually ended with the Missouri Compromise, which allowed it to be a slave state with the admission of Maine as a free state. Before this compromise, various proposals were floated, all swirling around allowing or prohibiting slavery in the new state. A majority of Virginia's representatives in Congress desired the retention of slavery in Missouri at any price; however, Floyd was silent, and his biographer, Charles Henry Ambler, has inferred from various statements made by Floyd that he preferred immediate statehood to an extension of slavery, though admits there is "little evidence to show that he opposed the latter on general principles." However, when anti-slavery forces in Congress tried to delete a clause in Missouri's state constitution that would have prevented free blacks from settling in the state, Floyd opposed, on the principle of state's rights to decide its own matters and also because he was opposed to the growing Federal power. He stated:

If gentlemen would only expunge from their memories the progress of European liberty and institutions, they would find in America a number of states, or separate, independent, and distinct nations, confederated for common safety, and mutual protection, taught wisdom by the eternal feuds of Spain, England, France, and Germany, now consolidated into large empires. These states before the confederation could make war and peace, raise armies, or build a navy, coin money, pass bankrupt laws, naturalize foreigners, or regulate commerce ... Informed by Europe they knew Jealousies would arise, and constant strife render armies in every nation necessary to their defence, which would endanger their liberties and homes. These states then, in their sovereign and independent characters, were willing to enter into a compact, by which the power of making war and peace, and regulating commerce, possessed alike by all, should be transferred to a congress of the states, to be exercised with uniformity, for their mutual benefit; thus avoiding the evils of "superanuated and enslaved" Europe. These two were the only powers ever intended to be granted by the states. All other powers conferred by the compact are necessary to carry these two into execution.

Floyd's position was that Congress had allowed Missouri to become a sovereign state and that now its only choice was whether or not to admit it into the Union. Missouri came up again during the presidential election of 1820. At issue was whether its electoral votes were valid since it was still awaiting Congress's final approval of its constitution. Floyd argued for counting its votes, and the "debate which followed precipitated one of the liveliest 'scenes' ever witnessed ...". Disorder followed, and both Floyd and John Randolph were "so persistent in their interruptions as to necessitate an adjournment of the joint session". A compromise was brought forward to count it as "so many with the vote of Missouri and so many without it", but both Randolph and Floyd opposed this, which later prompted John Quincy Adams to describe their action as "an effort to bring Missouri into the Union 'by storm.'"

=== Oregon Country ===
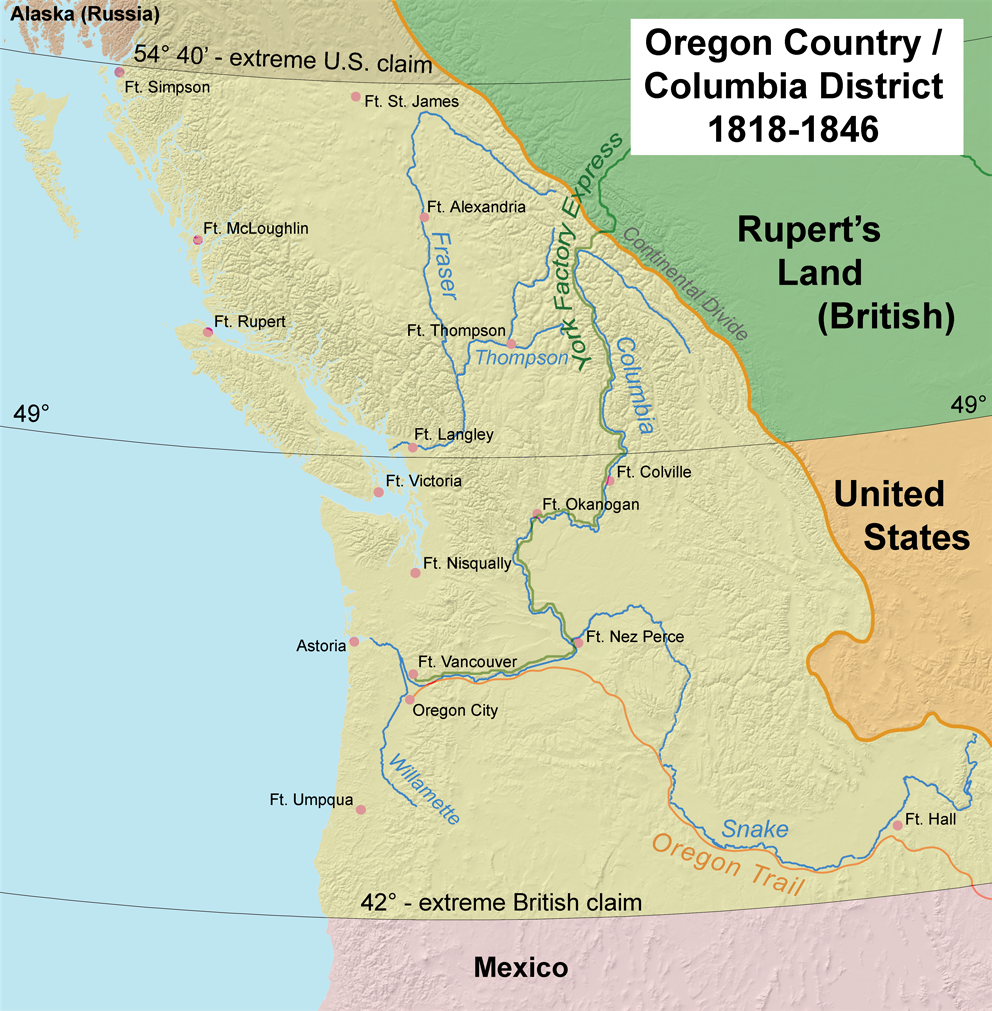
Map of Oregon Country

Since the end of the War of 1812, the Oregon Country was claimed by both Britain and the United States, but neither side pressed their claim. Floyd wanted to pursue America's interests there more aggressively. So on December 20, 1820, he brought this question, the first person to do so, to the attention of Congress with a resolution to appoint a committee and "inquire into the situation of the settlements upon the Pacific Ocean and the expediency of occupying the Columbia River." The resolution passed, and the committee was formed with Floyd as the chairman, and Thomas Metcalfe of Kentucky and Thomas Van Swearingen of Virginia as members. Floyd presented the committee's report on January 21, 1821, along with a bill to authorize the occupation of the Columbia River area. Nothing happened with the bill, and John Quincy Adams, then Secretary of State, criticized Floyd and characterized him as "a 'flaunting' canvasser and a politician seeking to win prestige and patronage, particularly the latter, by a vigorous opposition to the party in power" and attributed his motives for occupation by "a desire to provide a retreat for a defaulting relative and possibly for himself." Floyd then brought forth a resolution on December 10, 1821, to inquire into the expediency of occupying the area, and a week later presented another resolution to have the Secretary of the Navy give an estimate for a survey of harbors on the Pacific Coast.

On January 18, 1822, he introduced a bill to authorize and require the president to occupy "the territory of the United States" on the waters of the Columbia River and to organize the territory north of the 42d parallel of latitude and west of the Rocky Mountains as the "Territory of Oregon" as soon as the population reached 2000. Floyd then asked that all the correspondence relating to the Treaty of Ghent be presented to the House, which was possibly done in an attempt to damage John Quincy Adams' political ambitions by intimating that his negotiation neglected the United States' interests in the West. However, Floyd's bill was unsuccessful, as was a possible attempt to discredit Adams. Floyd next capitalized on the fear of Russia's claims of sovereignty in the area and succeeded in having a resolution adopted asking the president to inform the House whether any foreign government had communicated any claims to the territory, but the information was then deemed too sensitive to disclose to the House.

Not deterred in his attempt to discredit Adams, Floyd learned of a letter Jonathan Russell wrote to James Monroe on December 15, 1814, that contained "proof positive" of Adams' neglect of the West in the treaty negotiations. He successfully passed a resolution of inquiry that gave him the letter. Still, his actions backfired when the press attacked Floyd and forced him to defend his conduct. Adams certainly saw it as an attempt to damage his chances for the presidency. When President Monroe acknowledged that it was time to consider the rights of the United States in this area in December 1822, Floyd reintroduced his bill and argued for its passage. When a vote was taken on January 27, 1823, it failed to pass by a tally of 61 to 100. Throughout the rest of 1823 and 1824, Floyd continued in his pursuit. When President Monroe suggested that the second session of the 18th United States Congress look into establishing a military base at the mouth of the Columbia River, Floyd reintroduced his bill. He argued:

I ... appeal to the House to consider well our interests in the Western Ocean, on our western coast, and the trade to China and India; and the ease with which it can be brought down the Missouri. What is this commerce? Thousands of years have passed by, and, year after year, all the nations of the earth have, each year, sought the rich commerce of that country; all have enjoyed the riches of the East. That trade was sought by King Solomon, by Tyre, Sidon; this wealth found its way to Egypt, and at last to Rome, to France, Portugal, Spain, Holland, England, and finally to this Republic. How vast and incomparably rich must be that country and commerce, which has never ceased, one day, from the highest point of Jewish splendor to the instant that I am speaking, to supply the whole globe with all the busy imagination of man can desire for his ease, comfort, and enjoyment! Whilst we Rave so fair an opportunity offered to participate so largely in all this wealth and enjoyment, if not to govern and direct the whole, can it be possible that doubt, or mere points of speculation, will weigh with the House and cause us to lose forever the brightest prospect ever presented to the eyes of a nation?

His bill passed this time, with a vote of 115 to 57, but it failed in the Senate. He continued to argue for settling Oregon throughout the rest of his term in Congress.

=== Role in presidential elections ===
In the period leading up to the 1824 presidential election, a leading candidate was William H. Crawford. However, malfeasance charges were brought up against Crawford. A select committee was formed to investigate the charges, the chairman of which was Floyd. Crawford's rivals were determined to remove Floyd, as it was known he favored Crawford's candidacy, but their efforts failed. The committee acquitted Crawford of the charges.

The 1828 presidential election did not initially have a clear front-runner for the Southern politicians. They were united in their determination to unseat Adams but thought at first that Andrew Jackson's time had passed after his unsuccessful bid in 1824. However, his popularity had grown, and he was convinced that Jackson could serve as a figurehead only while the cabinet ran things; an alliance was formed between Northern "plain republicans", with Martin Van Buren as their spokesperson, and Southern "planters", with Senator Littleton Waller Tazewell of Virginia, an intimate friend of Floyd, as their spokesperson, to put Jackson in the White House. Floyd later wrote:

At this moment [1828] came the direful struggle between the great parties in Congress founded upon the claim which the majority ... from the north of the Potomac made to the right to lay any tax upon the importations into the United States which was intended to act as a protection to northern manufacturers by excluding foreign fabrics of the same kind. Hence all the states to the south of the Potomac became dependent upon the Northern States for a supply of whatever thing they might want, and in this way the South was compelled to sell its products low and buy from the North all articles it needed from twenty-five to one hundred and twenty-five per cent higher than from France to England ... At this juncture the southern party brought out Jackson.

Floyd worked hard on Jackson's behalf and considered his efforts sufficient for a post in the new cabinet, and so declined to run again for Congress. However, he did not receive this post.

=== Governor of Virginia ===
Floyd was Governor of Virginia from 1830 to 1834. A rift was already forming between Floyd and other Southern politicians, as Jackson failed to act on the tariff issue and other matters. On December 27, 1830, Floyd wrote to a friend:

As you long ago wrote me, and told me personally, nay predicted, Jackson has thrown me overboard; he is not only unwilling to give me employment, as he promised after I declined a reelection to Congress, but has in every single instance refused office to my friends, and even respectful consideration to my letters of recommendation to others. Nor does he stop here. I am at this moment enduring the whole weight of the opposition to him, his friends, and the power and patronage of his government to break down myself and my friends in Virginia, and to prevent my reelection to the office I now fill. Without having much reputation for political matters, I have read those folks at Washington thoroughly ... I am not of a temper to pocket insult, neglect, or injury. I have, my dear friend, determined on my course. I can be as silent and patient as any of my aboriginal ancestors,^{[a]} and like them I feel that vengeance would be sweet, but when the day of retribution shall come, it will be marked by the effects of the tomahawk. You must know that notwithstanding all efforts to prevent it I calculate on a reelection. Then I will begin to formulate a message in which, as you know, my own principles will be maintained.

In January 1831, Floyd was successful in his bid for re-election as governor, this time for three years, and as the first governor under the new state constitution enacted in 1830. Virginia's economy had seen an upswing under his stewardship, and in his December address, he said he wanted to see this continue. He unveiled a "bold economic program" that included a network of state-subsidized internal improvements designed to make Virginia a "commercial empire". The success of his plan and Virginia's future, however, depended on national politics and who captured the White House in 1832. His preoccupation with economic growth for Virginia and how the Jackson plans were threatening this made him different from other southern "nullifiers", whose primary fear was the abolition of slavery. Floyd opposed slavery purely for economic reasons, as he viewed it as inefficient. "Though an implacable Southern-rights man, the governor was a foe of the peculiar institution."

The presidential election of 1832 was approaching, and Floyd was torn: He wanted to see Vice President Calhoun as the presidential candidate but wondered if he should first be proposed as the vice presidential candidate for the second term. He felt Calhoun had a better chance to beat Jackson than Clay, and he wrote to Calhoun in April 1831 to know his opinion: "Under all these views I really do not know which course to take; whether to announce you a candidate for the presidency and take the hazard of war, or wait the fate of Clay. We would be glad to know your opinion about these things." Floyd, along with Tazewell and John Tyler, were considered the leaders of the Virginians that had become disaffected with Jackson and had turned to Calhoun. They felt that Jackson had repudiated "virtue and ability as well as Old Republican tenets." According to historian Stephen Oates, "In Floyd's opinion, the federal government under "King Andrew" had usurped power left and right, thus allowing the majority to run roughshod over the minority."

Clay did not agree to postpone his bid for the presidency in favor of Calhoun, and Calhoun did not put himself forward. At some point, Floyd went home to rest for a time and then returned in time to witness his political friends courting the Anti-Masonic party and their candidate for president, William Wirt. Floyd "refused absolutely to have anything to do with one of Wirt's 'laxity in morals' and 'opportune' political thinking; with one who would turn the federal government over to 'fanatics, knaves, and religious bigots.'" Floyd, however, ceased his objections against Jackson for a time.

Nat Turner's Rebellion occurred on August 21, 1831. In November, he decided to recommend to the General Assembly gradual abolition of slavery, either for the whole state or for the counties west of the Blue Ridge Mountains if the former could not be attained, but with a goal for abolition for the entire state in time. However, something caused him to change his mind, for his annual message did not contain this recommendation. Instead, he encouraged delegates from western counties to introduce its discussion. However, the debate heated, Floyd and others "became alarmed", and eastern delegates discussed splitting the state. Floyd observed that "a sensation had been engendered which required great delicacy and caution in touching." As a result, a vote was instead put forth on whether the state should legislate this issue. The pro-slavery party narrowly won sixty-seven to sixty. During Floyd's address to the General Assembly, he did, however, touch upon the national issues swirling around the country. As Floyd's biographer noted:

In clear and forceful language Floyd reasserted the state sovereignty theory of government, as guaranteed by the 'Compact or Constitution,' holding the Federal Government to be merely the 'Agent of the States' entrusted only with such powers as were originally intended to operate 'externally' and 'upon nations foreign to those composing the Confederacy.' He called attention to the disregard with which 'an unrestrained majority' had received the memorials and protests of some of the 'sovereign states,' justifying their acts by precedent and expediency and thus melting away 'the solder of the Federal chain;' also to the fact that it was then 'strongly insinuated' that the states could not 'interpose to arrest an unconstitutional measure.' Such a course, he was certain, could result only in nullifying the federal constitution and in a complete failure in our experiment in government.

When the Democratic Party announced that Van Buren would be their vice presidential candidate, Floyd was not happy. He renewed his antagonism with Jackson accordingly. Floyd felt that Van Buren would inject "Northern principles" into the government and would "lead with a rapidity of lightening [sic] to the sudden and immediate emancipation of slavery". Virginians led the movement to prevent Van Buren's election. Philip P. Barbour was brought forward as a running mate on a Jackson-Barbour ticket. "In this way Floyd expected to throw the choice of the vice-president into the Senate, where, it was thought, Van Buren's election could be prevented." As historian William J. Cooper noted, "For the Calhounites in Virginia, replacing Van Buren with Barbour would achieve two desired goals: eliminate the man they designated as the great enemy both of Calhoun and of the Virginia doctrine as well as symbolize the political resurgence of Virginia." Barbour, however, later withdrew his candidacy to accept Jackson's appointment as judge of the United States Circuit Court for the Eastern District of Virginia, and Van Buren became Vice President.

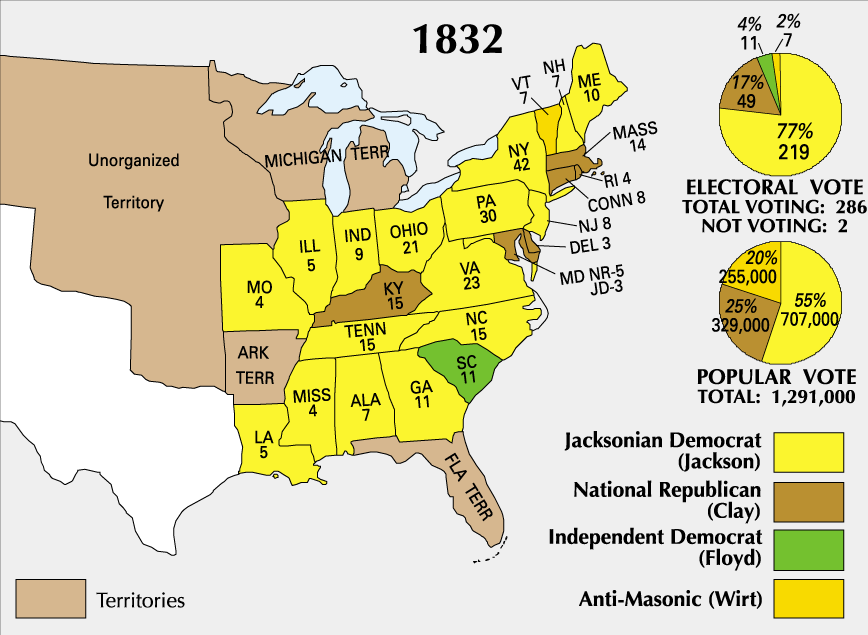
Presidential electoral votes by state. Floyd carried South Carolina (in green)

The Nullification Crisis had been ongoing since 1828, and in December 1832, Jackson came down squarely against "the nullifiers" in his proclamation. However, in the presidential election of 1832, Jackson confirmed his power in the Southern United States by winning his re-election. Jackson had skillfully neutralized Barbour's movement, and Clay did not appear on several southern tickets. It was only in Calhoun's stronghold of South Carolina that Jackson did not fare well: they put all their electoral votes (11) for Floyd, their ally, for President of the United States. South Carolina, at that time, had the legislature appoint their electors, and was the only state in this election to do so.

Floyd's biographer commented that despite advocating moderation in his annual message in December 1832, he was "secretly counting the costs and horrors of war" and that Floyd characterized Jackson's Proclamation in response to South Carolina's Nullification Ordinance as an "outrage upon our institutions" and a "satire upon the revolution" making war inevitable. A letter to Tazewell at this time called Jackson the "tyrant usurper" and feared a civil war would be the result. When Floyd learned that Clay was willing to compromise on the tariff and that South Carolina would submit her issues to a "convention of the states", he supported both. The crisis averted, he toned down his opposition to Jackson but was unwilling to return to the Democratic Party while Van Buren was the leader. As a result, he turned to Clay and attempted to bring him and John C. Calhoun together in a new political party to support these views. "... the elimination of both Clay and Calhoun from the list of eligibles for the presidency had become temporarily imperative. Accordingly, Floyd set himself to the task of working out a fighting alliance between all the factions opposed to the administration. To this end, he encouraged discord within the Democratic party, while scrupulously keeping the conflicting ambitions of his own friends in the background." This was the beginnings of the Whig Party.

Floyd suffered a stroke in 1834 while still in office but was able to serve out his term. He approached Littleton Waller Tazewell to be his successor, who was ultimately successful. "Believing that 'great events are in the gale' he urged Tazewell to hasten to Richmond and to be prepared to lay down his share in the power of the state as he had lain [sic] it down for the 'Confederacy,' 'uninjured and undiminished.'" On April 16, 1834, he left Richmond for his home, escorted by Bigger's Blues, Richardson's Artillery, Myer's Cavalry, and Richardson's Riflemen, Richmond's volunteer companies.

=== Electoral history ===
- 1817; Floyd was elected to the U.S. House of Representatives with 57.6% of the vote, defeating Federalist Elijah McClannahan.
- 1819; Floyd was re-elected unopposed.
- 1821; Floyd was re-elected unopposed.

== Catholicism and death ==
In 1832, Floyd's daughter, Letitia Floyd Lewis, converted to Catholicism, and "owing to her prominence, caused a sensation throughout the state" of Virginia. Then followed other family members, including Floyd himself, after he left office as governor. "The conversion of the Floyd and Johnston families led into the Catholic Church other members of the most distinguished families of the South."

Floyd suffered a stroke and died on August 17, 1837, in Sweet Springs in Monroe County, Virginia (now West Virginia), and his tombstone can be found in the Lewis Family Cemetery, on the hill behind the remains of the historic Lynnside Manor. His grave is near to that of John Lewis.

On January 15, 1831, the General Assembly of Virginia passed an act creating the present county of Floyd out of Montgomery County, named after Floyd, who was governor at the time.

== Notes ==
a. There was a family legend that Floyd's paternal grandmother was a descendant of the Powhatan chieftain Opchanacanough. Ambler, Charles Henry, The Life and Diary of John Floyd (Richmond Press), pages 13-30.

U.S. House of Representatives
Preceded by James Breckinridge	Member of the U.S. House of Representatives from Virginia's 5th congressional district 4 March 1817 – 4 March 1823	Succeeded by John Randolph
Preceded by Arthur Smith	Member of the U.S. House of Representatives from Virginia's 20th congressional district 4 March 1823 – 3 March 1829	Succeeded by Robert Craig
Party political offices
New political party	Nullifier nominee for President of the United States; 1832	Succeeded by Hugh Lawson White; Endorsed
Political offices
Preceded by William Branch Giles	Governor of Virginia; 4 March 1830 – 31 March 1834	Succeeded by Littleton Waller Tazewell
