= Westervelt massacre =

Attack by Native Americans in frontier Kentucky

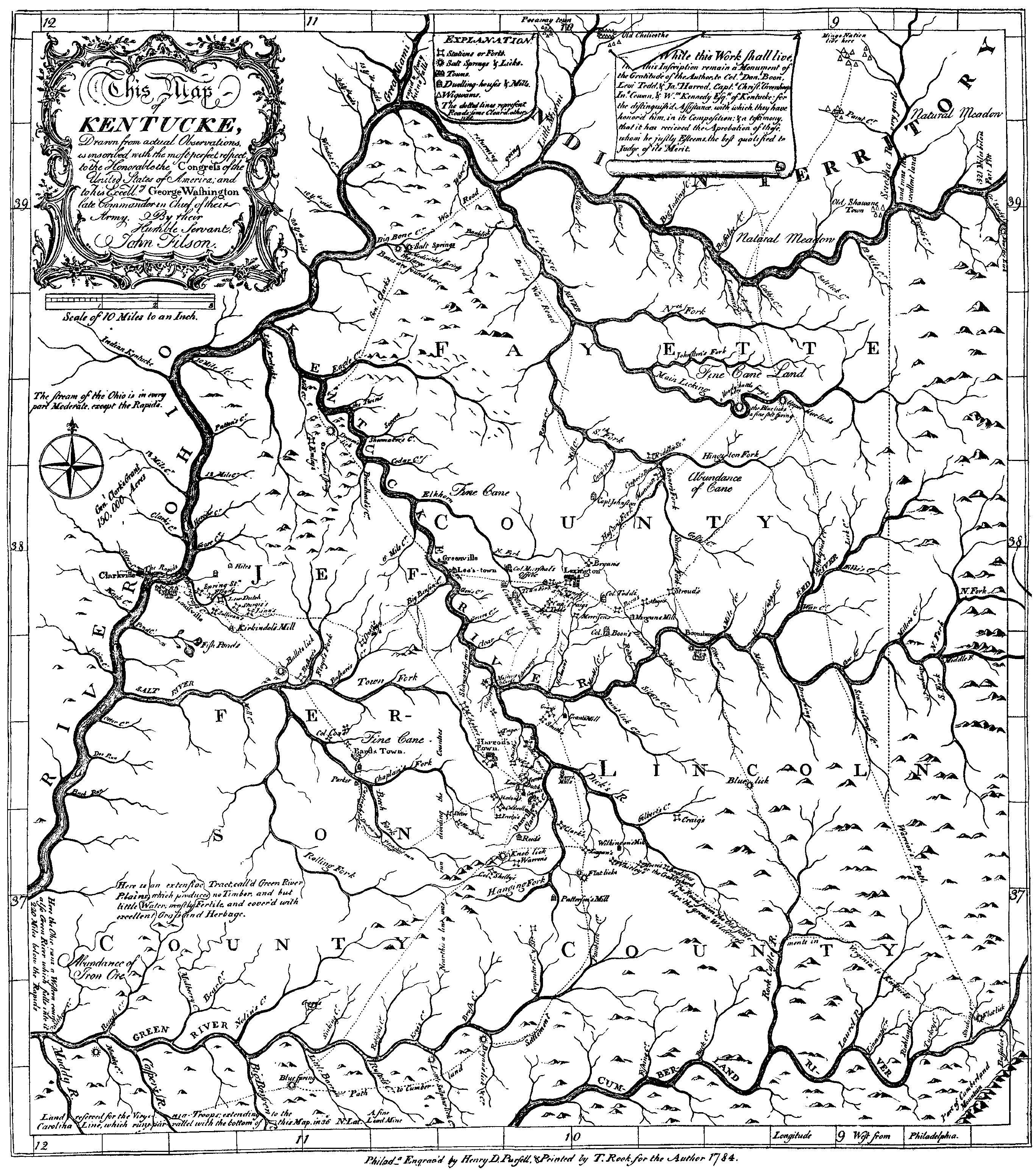
- A map of Kentucke County, Virginia made in 1784 by John Filson. The Westervelt massacre occurred approximately 12 miles southeast of Low Dutch Station.
- Location: Floyd's Fork and Broad Run, Kentucky
- Date: June 27, 1780
- Attack type: Massacre
- Deaths: 17 killed
- Perpetrator: Native Americans

The Westervelt massacre, also known as the Westerfield massacre, was an attack by Native Americans on a caravan of Dutch American settlers on June 27, 1780, near the frontier. Occurring amidst the backdrop of the Revolutionary War, the attack remains one of the largest massacres in the history of Kentucky.

The settlers, who were escaping Bird's invasion of Kentucky, left the colonial settlement of Low Dutch Station to relocate to Harrodsburg; the route they took went southwards via what would become the Old Shepherdsville Road to the modern-day Shepherdsville, before turning east-southeast down the trails along the Salt River, taking them through present-day Spencer County towards Harrodsburg. Harrodburg was fortified, making it an attractive location to escape Captain Bird's invading army from the north. However, the settlers never made it to Sheperdsville; British-allied Native Americans were active in the area immediately east of Low Dutch Station (where the Mall St. Matthews now stands).

The settlers, who were travelling in a caravan, were ambushed and massacred in a surprise attack by the British-allied Native Americans at night after they had travelled 12 miles on June 26. Debate exists over historians concerning the exact location of the massacre, though historical consensus places the event at Floyd's Fork and Broad Run, in modern-day Kentucky. The caravan was formed by Dutch-American settler Jacobus Westervelt and consisted of forty-one settlers from ten different families; ten of the seventeen settlers killed were members of the Westervelt family. Men, women and children alike were killed in the massacre. After committing the massacre, the Native Americans present scalped their victims and gave them to the British, who paid them a bounty of £5 for each scalp.

The massacre led to wave of fear among settlers in the region, and drove many of them to join Patriot militia under the command of George Rogers Clark. In September 2019, a historical marker was erected at the site of the massacre, after a consensus had been reached among Kentucky historians as to the definitive location of the event, which was determined to be near Brooks, Bullitt County.

== Historical background ==
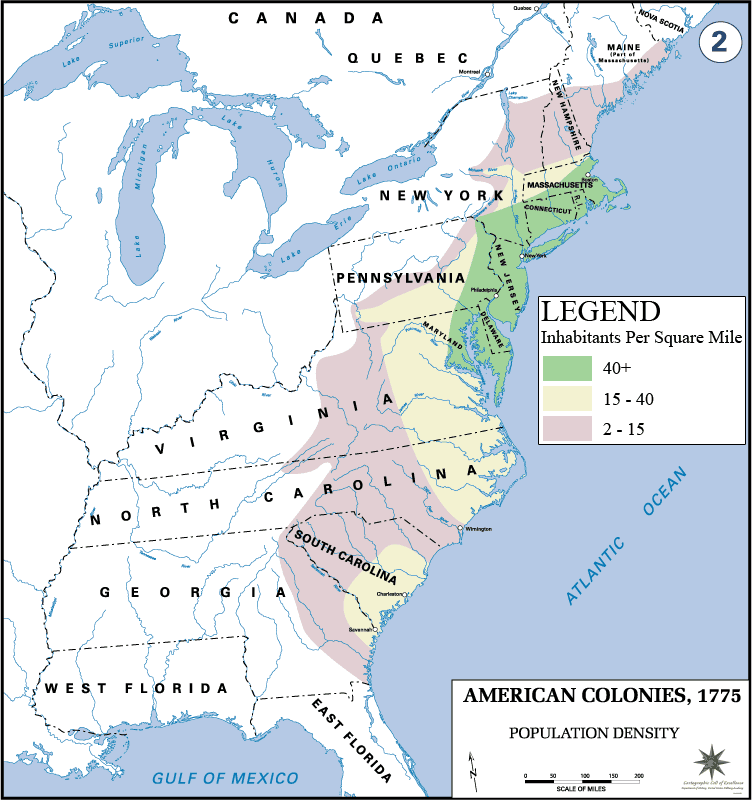
Population density in the American Colonies in 1775. At the time of the Westervelt Massacre, in 1780, Kentucky was part of the Commonwealth of Virginia. The Westervelt family arrived during the American Revolutionary War and were among the first colonists to settle in the territory.

Following the issuing of the Second Virginia Charter in 1609, the territory claimed by the English colony of Virginia was expanded to cover the U.S. state of Kentucky. However, the areas claimed by Virginia were in name only and would not be officially explored by white settlers until 1750. A scouting party, led by Thomas Walker, returned with reports of indigenous activities, topographical surveys, and botanical research. During the expedition, the first colonial house was also built in Kentucky. However, Walker and his scouting party returned to the colonies. The area would not be permanently settled by white settlers until 1775, during the beginning stages of the American Revolutionary War.

In 1780, Hendrick Banta led a large contingent of Dutch American settlers from Pennsylvania into Kentucky, where they founded the settlement of Low Dutch Station along Beargrass Creek. In the spring of 1780, settler Jacobus Westervelt and his family arrived in Kentucky County, Virginia. They were among the earliest group of settlers on the Kentucky frontier. The Westervelts were one of the founding families of the Low Dutch Station settlement. However, by the summer of 1780, the Westervelt family made preparations to move to Harrod's Town, Kentucky; the region was becoming increasingly dangerous with Indian raids. Likewise, a British Army expedition of 750 men from the Province of Quebec, led by Captain Henry Bird, resulted in many settlers seeking safer territory. The British expedition crossed into Kentucky on May 25, 1780. On June 21, 1780, Jacobus Westervelt purchased 400 acres of land in the area of Harrod's Town. Shortly thereafter, Jacobus Westervelt hired John Thixton as a guide for the caravan. The Dutch-American families gathered in Low Dutch Station the following weekend, setting out on June 26, 1780.

== The massacre ==
First account testimonies of the Westervelt massacre were preserved in the manuscripts of Lyman C. Draper in 1865. According to the reports, the caravan camped by running water approximately twelve miles from Low Dutch Station. The families that were traveling included the Westervelts, Swans, McGlaughlins, Plyburns, and Thixtons. In the darkness of early morning, the settlers were awakened to the sounds of carnage.

As historian Ronald Belcher wrote:

Survivors from the attack recounted hearing hacking sounds, chopping, "crackling of skulls, plundering and screaming", joined by the sound of volleys discharged from muskets. In moments, about half the members of the Westervelt group were slaughtered despite valiant attempts by the men to protect the women and children. Fewer than half of the approximately forty settlers managed to escape.

The majority of the men were killed within minutes. The only men that managed to escape were the frontier guides: John Thixton, William Thixton, and Thomas Pearce. Several of the wives and children were also killed, while others were taken prisoner.

== See also ==
- Chenoweth Massacre
- List of Indian massacres
- Long Run Massacre
