= Floydsburg, Kentucky =

Unincorporated community in Kentucky, United States

Coordinates: 38°18′38.62″N 85°27′35.20″W

Floydsburg is a rural unincorporated community in Oldham County, Kentucky, United States. It is located southeast of Crestwood on KY 1408.

This community was named its location near pioneer James John Floyd's Ford Station. The Floyds Fork, a tributary of the Salt River, starts nearby.

Floydsburg was the birthplace of the American Civil War Colonel and 14th Governor of Illinois (1865–1869) Richard J. Oglesby on July 25, 1824. He also served in the Illinois Senate (1860) and the United States Senate for Illinois (1873–1879).
