= John Floyd (pioneer) =

American military officer (1750–1783)

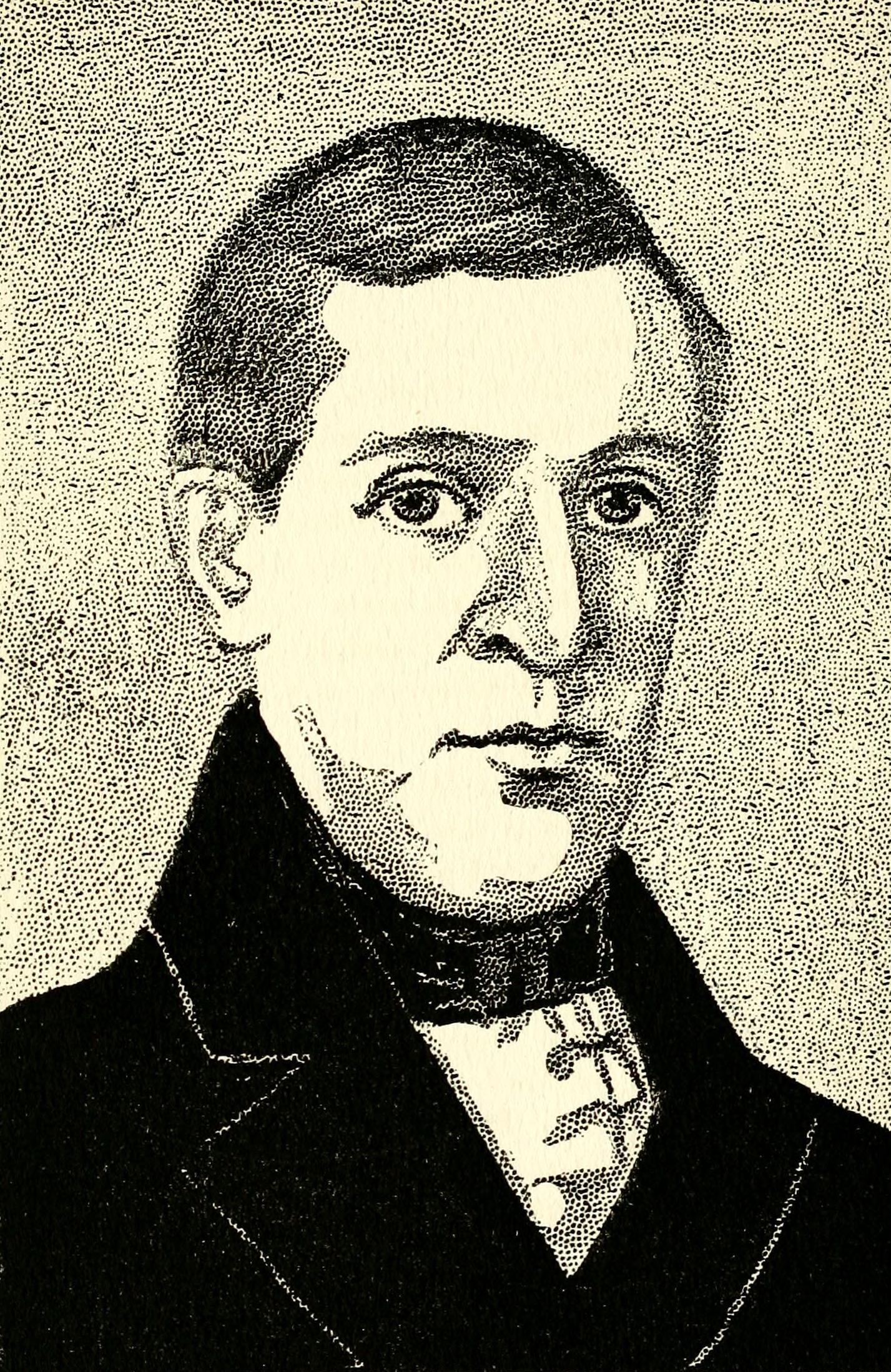
- 1920 illustration of Floyd by Kathleen Jennings, based on a photograph of a lost portrait.
- Born: 1750; Virginia, British America
- Died: 10 April 1783 (aged 32–33); Bullitt County, Kentucky
- Cause of death: Gunshot
- Resting place: Breckinridge Cemetery; St. Matthews, Kentucky
- Children: John

Colonel James John Floyd (1750 – 10 April 1783) was an American military officer. An early settler of St. Matthews, Kentucky, he helped lay out Louisville. In Kentucky, he served as a Colonel of the Kentucky Militia in which he participated in raids with George Rogers Clark and later became one of the first judges of Kentucky.

== Biography ==
=== Virginia ===
Floyd was born in 1750 in Amherst County, Virginia, to William and Abadiah (Davis) Floyd, descendants of Welsh immigrants. Family legend was that his mother was a descendant of the Powhatan chieftain Opchanacanough. Another family tradition maintains that her brother was Evan Davis, the grandfather of Jefferson Davis. In Virginia, the Floyd family operated a farm and made a decent living there, but the younger Floyd knew opportunity to do better was in the west.

At the age of 18, he married Matilda Burford, daughter of Daniel Burford, sheriff of Amherst County, but she died a year later during the birth of their daughter, Mourning Floyd. In 1770, at the age of 20, Floyd moved to Botetourt County, Virginia, to seek employment. He worked as a teacher while living in the home of William Preston. Preston, a prominent frontier Virginian, was the surveyor for the western part of Virginia then known as Fincastle County, Virginia, which stretched as far as the Mississippi River.

Floyd became a deputy surveyor under Preston, doing land survey jobs from time to time. When he was not working with Preston, he rode as a deputy sheriff with Daniel Trigg, working under Sheriff Col. William Christian of Botetourt County. Preston started receiving applications for land claims to be located and surveyed from veterans of the French and Indian War. In 1774, Floyd was selected to lead a group of surveyors into what is now West Virginia and Kentucky.

=== Kentucky ===
Floyd and a team of seven surveyors set out for the Falls of the Ohio on April 7, 1774 with a group of men claiming land. They traversed the Kanawha and Ohio River for most of the trip. Floyd had previously surveyed land for George Washington and Patrick Henry along the Kanawha River. In mid-May, they arrived in Kentucky Country and had an experience with Native Americans who came down the river and had passes from the commandant at Fort Pitt warning off white men as a part of Lord Dunmore's War. This scared off some of the group, but none of the surveyors left, and the rest of the expedition continued on. While in the area sectioning land tracts, Floyd bought a 2,000-acre (8.1 km^{2}) site for himself in what is now St. Matthews, Kentucky.

With the threat of a war with the Shawnee looming, Preston and Cap. William Russell sent frontiersmen Daniel Boone and Michael Stoner on a mission to warn settlers and surveyors to come back to Botetourt County. Unfortunately, Native Americans attacked Floyd's group before the warning arrived, killing two members of the surveying party. The remaining members of Floyd's group fled to safety down the Ohio and Mississippi River to New Orleans. Floyd, unable to hold out by himself, went for the most direct route to Virginia, traversing across the terrain in 16 days. He arrived near Clinch Mountain in Virginia to discover the locals rallying for Dunmore's War. Floyd, eager to participate, gathered a militia together and followed the main army's trail and arrived half a day late to the October 10, 1774, battle that ended Dunmore's War at the Battle of Point Pleasant.

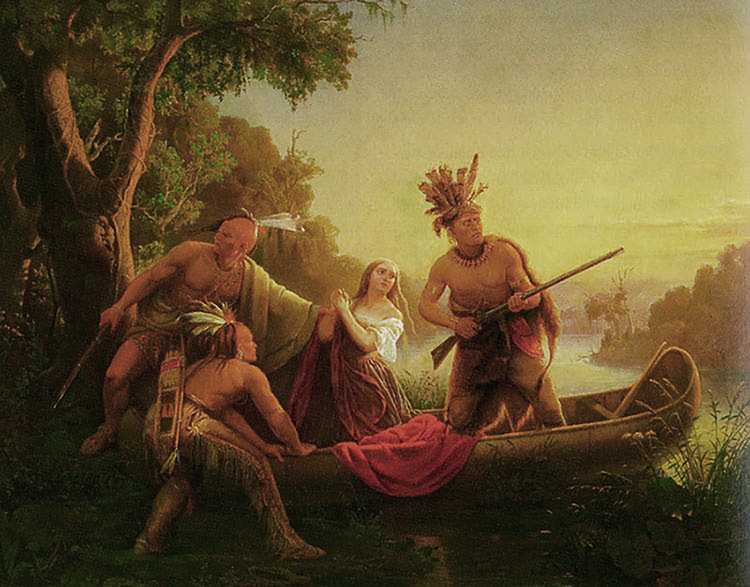
The abduction of Jemima Boone by Indians by Karl Ferdinand Wimar

On April 21, 1775, Floyd began preparing to re-enter Kentucky through Cumberland Gap. Floyd took a party of 32 men to Dix River in 1775 to set up a camp. Only twenty miles from Boonesborough, Kentucky, which was founded by Daniel Boone on the Kentucky River. On May 23, 1775, Floyd was sent as a delegate from the settlement of St. Asaph to Boonesborough to meet to agree on laws and regulations for requirements to establish a colony called Transylvania. This marked the earliest form of any government west of the Allegheny Mountains. During the summer of 1776, he was living in Boonesborough and accepted the surveyor of Transylvania by Richard Henderson the leader of the colony attempt.

Floyd participated in the rescue of Jemima Boone from four Shawnee and one Cherokee in July 1776, an event that would become a popular frontier story. The first night, only five miles were covered due to a delay at crossing a river. The next day they tracked them over 40 miles (64 km) and overtook them while the Native Americans prepared a campfire to cook.

Information began trickling into the Kentucky Country about the American Revolution in late 1776.

=== Privateer ===
In 1776, when Fincastle County was abolished by the Virginia legislature, John Floyd's job as a surveyor ended. In September 1776, Floyd left Boonesborough and returned to Virginia. Floyd traveled to Williamsburg and signed on to a privateering syndicate and agreed to serve on board the Massachusetts schooner Phoenix. The syndicate members included Robert Morris, Carter Braxton, Michael Gratz, Dr. Thomas Walker, Edmund Pendleton, and others.

Floyd placed a notice in a Williamsburg newspaper on December 26, 1776, that he intended to leave the colony of Virginia for a few months. Carter Braxton's instructions to Phoenix captain Joseph Cunningham of Boston indicated the schooner was to sail from Yorktown, Virginia to the West Indies for a three-month voyage. Floyd sailed out of Chesapeake Bay in early January 1777. The Phoenix successfully arrived back in Boston in early April 1777 but without Floyd, who had been captured and transported to Forton Prison near Portsmouth, England. In late October 1777, Floyd escaped from Forton and found his way to Paris. On October 30, 1777, Floyd received assistance in Paris from Arthur Lee who, along with Benjamin Franklin and Silas Deane, agreed to advance him funds to return to Virginia.

While in Paris, Floyd "obtained his wedding Clothes, a rich and beautiful pair of brilliant shoe buckles for his intended bride, a Scarlet Coat for himself." Floyd returned to Virginia from Paris arriving in February 1778. After months of recuperating from his illnesses, Floyd married Jane Buchanan, a ward of Col. Preston's, on November 2, 1778.

He lived in Virginia on his father's homestead for a year before meeting George Rogers Clark.

=== Return to Kentucky ===
Floyd returned to the Falls of the Ohio again in October 1779 with his new wife and son, William Floyd. His brothers Isham, Robert, and Charles, and sisters Jemima and Abadiah, came with him to Kentucky this time. Floyd had returned to the 2,000 acres (8.1 km^{2}) of land he bought in 1774 to keep squatters off his land and became the first settler in Jefferson County who had ownership of the land he lived on. They built a cabin near 3rd and Main Street in present-day Louisville for a temporary shelter for the women and children while they established a settlement near Beargrass Creek. The settlement became known as Floyd's Station as 10 more families located there, and a Stockade was added. There, he would be the leader of the area that took in part a small local war with the Native Americans and was led by George Rogers Clark. All the Floyd brothers participated. In 1780, by the act of the Virginia General Assembly, Floyd was placed as one of seven trustees of Louisville with the power to layout and establish the town. Later, George Rogers Clark convinced Governor Thomas Jefferson in 1781 to appoint Floyd as Colonel of the Kentucky Militia, and also later in the year, Justice of the Peace and surveyor of Jefferson County.

Floyd succeeded Col. Christy as the County Lieutenant of Jefferson County in 1781 making him responsible for the defense of the settlers in the county. The area was regularly being raided by Native Americans and dozens of settlers had been killed. Floyd wrote two letters to Thomas Jefferson pleading for support.

In September 1781, Floyd led 27 men in a rescue/burial mission as a result of the previous day's Long Run Massacre. When they reached the site, Floyd's detachment was ambushed. The majority of his men were killed (17 out of the 27), but Floyd narrowly managed to escape. This became known as Floyds Defeat.

Floyd participated in the Battle of Blue Licks which then led George Rogers Clark to raid several Native American villages along the Great Miami River. Floyd also took part in these raids. On November 4, 1782, it was reported during the raids by Clark that Col. Floyd took 300 men to approach a village of Native Americans but was discovered too early causing the group to flee and most of them escaped.

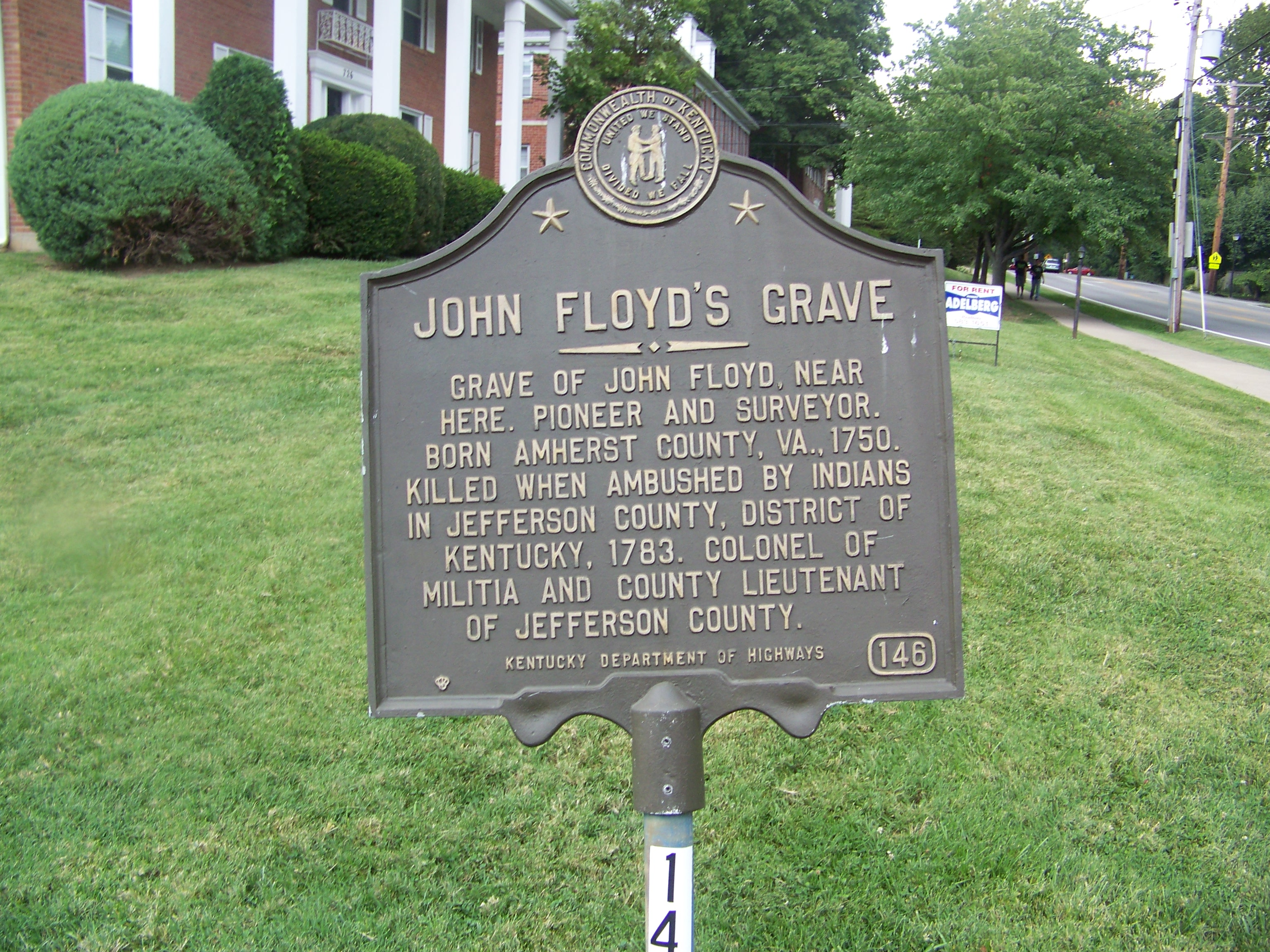
Historical marker for John Floyd's grave site

In 1783, Virginia organized the government of Kentucky and Floyd was appointed to be one of the first two judges of Kentucky. Later in the year in March he would write Preston informing him of his brother in law Billy Buchanan being killed by Native Americans . Also in the letter Floyd wrote that he dreamed that his fate might become the same. This proved true as a month later Floyd was wounded on April 8, 1783, by Native Americans while on his way to Bullitt's Lick while wearing the scarlet coat he had brought from Paris. He died of his injuries on April 10, 1783. His widow Jane preserved the scarlet coat until 1812 when the coat was buried with her, as she had requested. Floyd is buried near Floyd's Station at Breckinridge Cemetery.

== Legacy ==
Floyd County, Kentucky, is named for John Floyd. He is also credited as the namesake of Floyd County, Indiana, although it has been argued that this county was actually named for Davis Floyd. Floyd's Station Springhouse still stands today. The Floyds Fork river is named after him as well, which when it meets with the Salt River is near the location where he was mortally wounded. Floydsburg, Kentucky, a small unincorporated community is also named after Floyd. Floyd Street, that runs North to South from downtown Louisville through the University of Louisville was named after him as well.

== See also ==
- Charles Floyd – Nephew (Son of Robert Floyd)
- Davis Floyd – Nephew (Son of Robert Floyd)
- John Floyd – Son and Governor of Virginia
- George Rogers Clark Floyd – Grandson
- John B. Floyd – Grandson and Governor of Virginia
- Floyds Fork
- Floyd's Station, Kentucky
