= Long Run massacre =

Massacre by Native Americans in frontier Kentucky

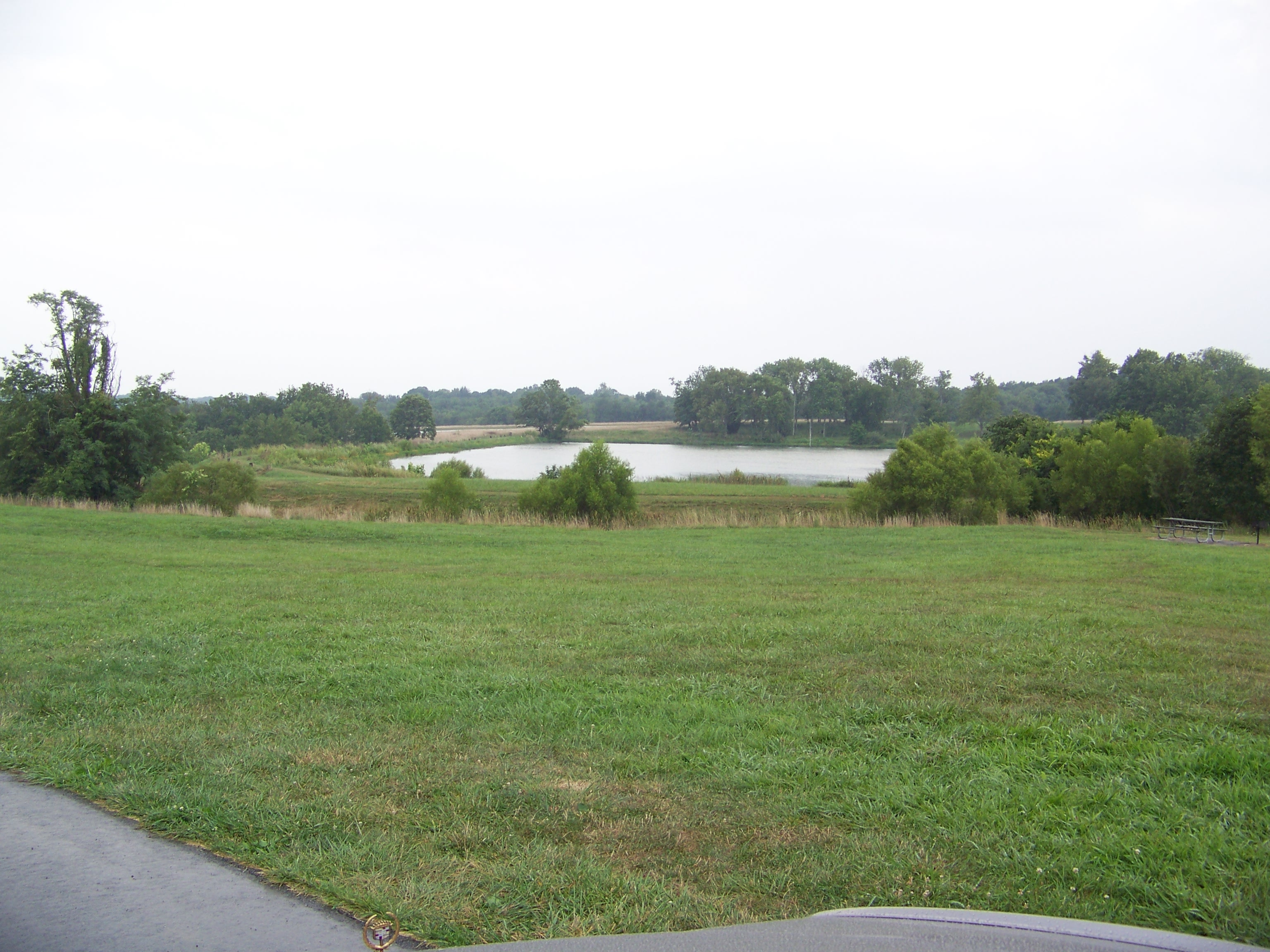
- Lake in area of the massacre as it appears in 2008

- Long Run massacre (Kentucky)
- Location: 38°10′56.42″N 85°29′13.28″W; Floyd's Fork, Kentucky
- Date: 13–14 September 1781
- Attack type: Raid
- Deaths: ~32 killed
- Perpetrator: Indian war parties

The Long Run massacre occurred on 13 September 1781 at the intersection of Floyd's Fork creek with Long Run Creek, along the Falls Trace, a trail in what is now eastern Jefferson County, Kentucky.

A day earlier, settlers at Painted Stone Station, established by Squire Boone, had learned that the fort was about to be raided by a large Indian war party under the command of Loyalist captain Alexander McKee. Most chose to abandon that station for the better defended ones near Beargrass Creek, and had left the injured Boone and one other family behind. Some settlers hesitated for two days before moving toward Linn's Station. Following the loss of part of their military guard, the party was ambushed at thirteen-mile tree, 8 miles (13 km) from Linn's Station. At least seven settlers were killed; Indian losses are unknown. The survivors fled and reached Linn's Station by nightfall.

Despite historical markers and at least one published report indicating that at least 60 people were killed and only a few escaped, only about 15 settlers were actually killed, followed by 17 soldiers under Colonel John Floyd who were attacked the following day when they went to bury their remains. During the second engagement, however, a Wyandot chief present was killed, which led to the dispersal of the Indian forces and the end of McKee's raid.

Reenactments are held annually in the Shelbyville, Kentucky area by the Painted Stone Settlers near the site of the massacre.

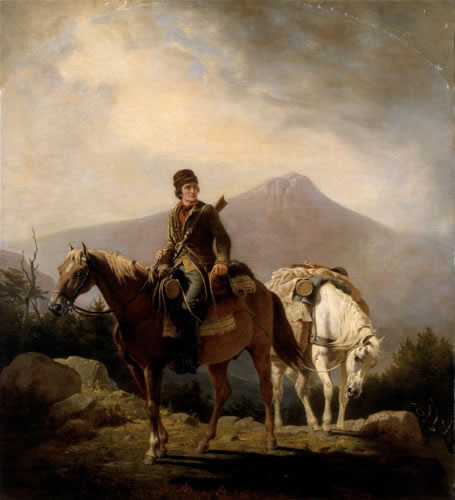
Squire Boone Crossing the Mountains with Stores for His Brother Daniel, Encamped in the Wilds of Kentucky (1852)

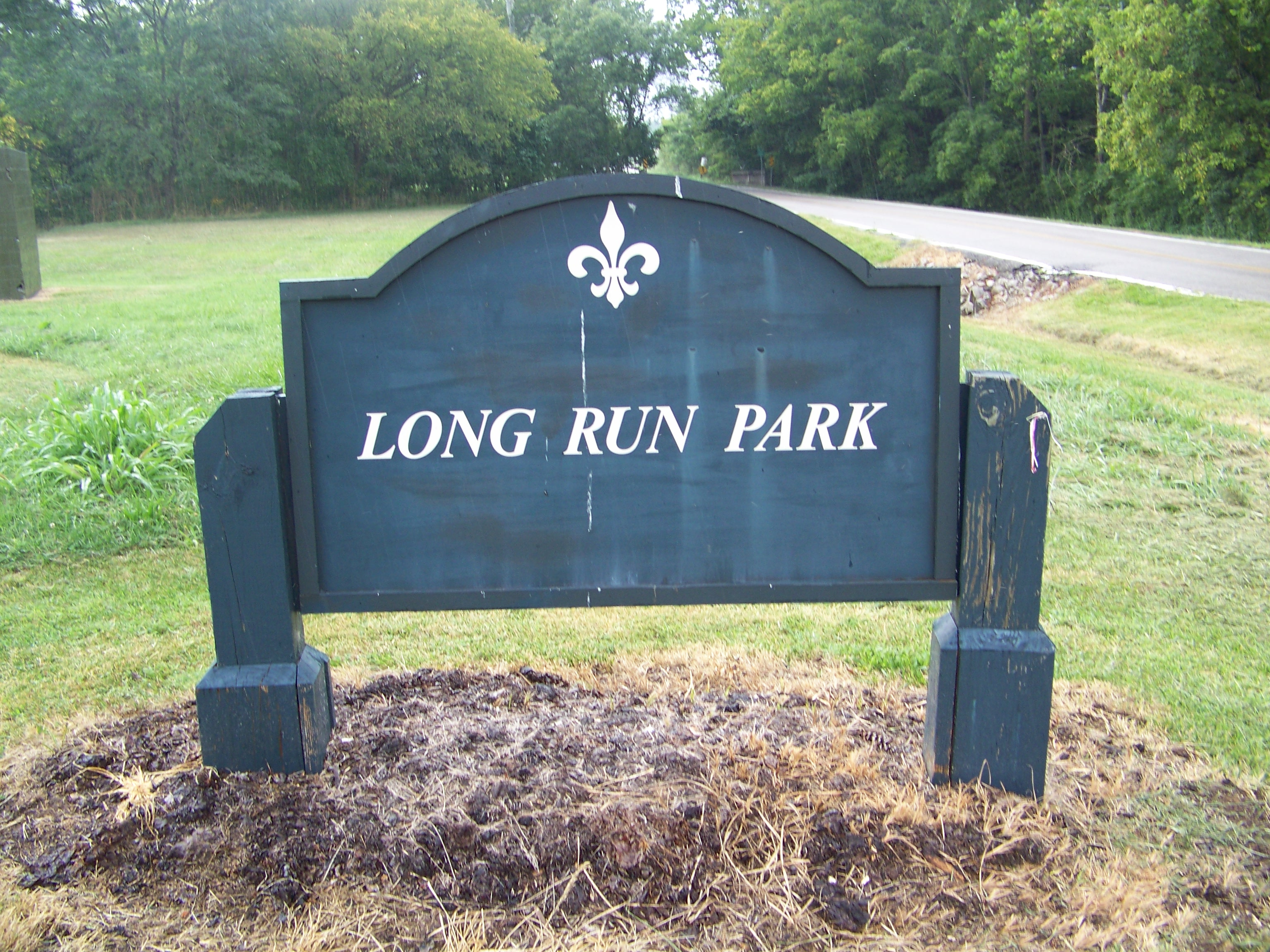
Park entrance sign

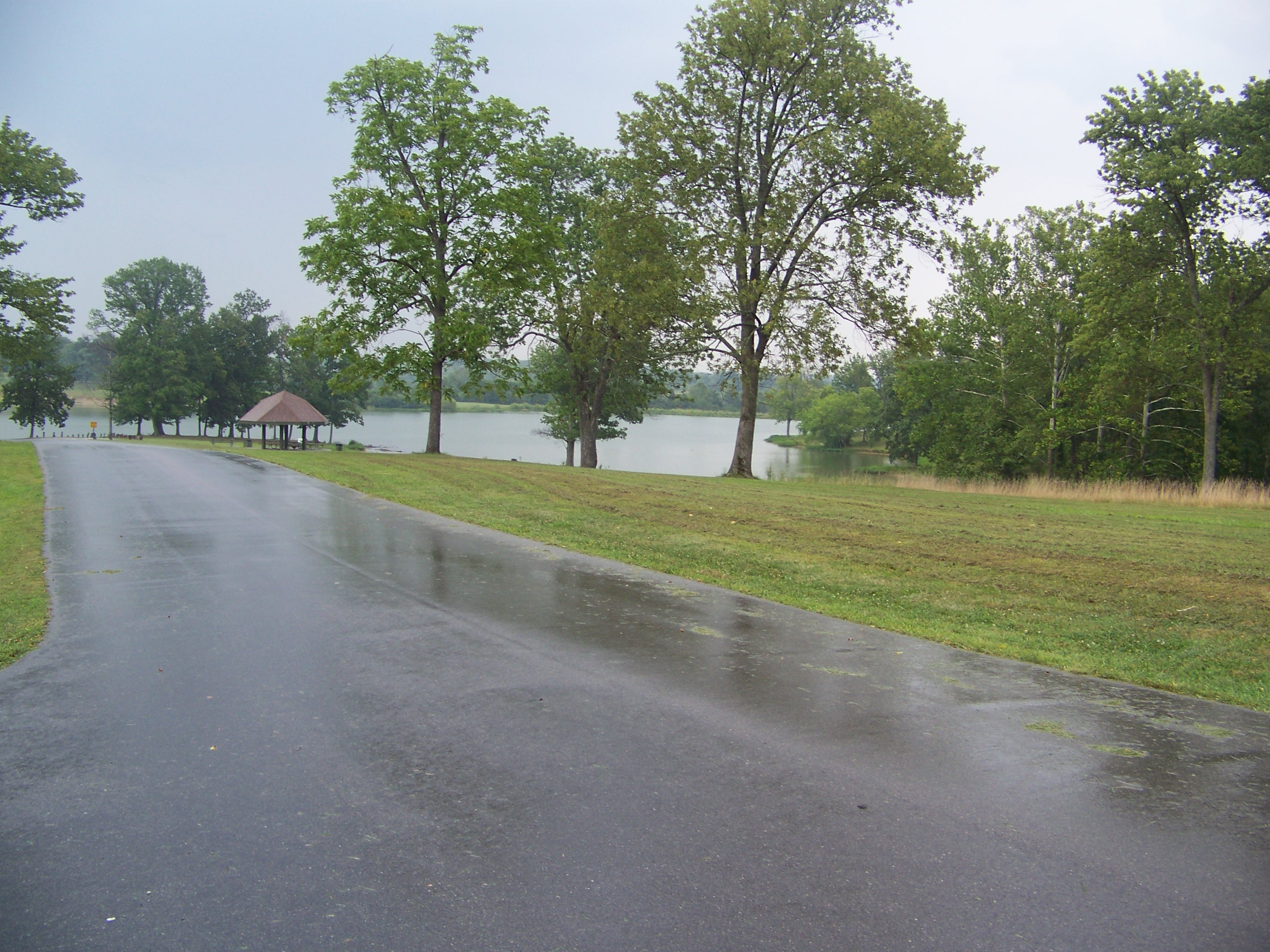
Park scene

== See also ==
- Fort Nelson (Kentucky)
- History of Louisville, Kentucky
- List of battles fought in Kentucky
