= Lynnside Historic District =

Historic district in West Virginia, United States

- U.S. National Register of Historic Places
- U.S. Historic district
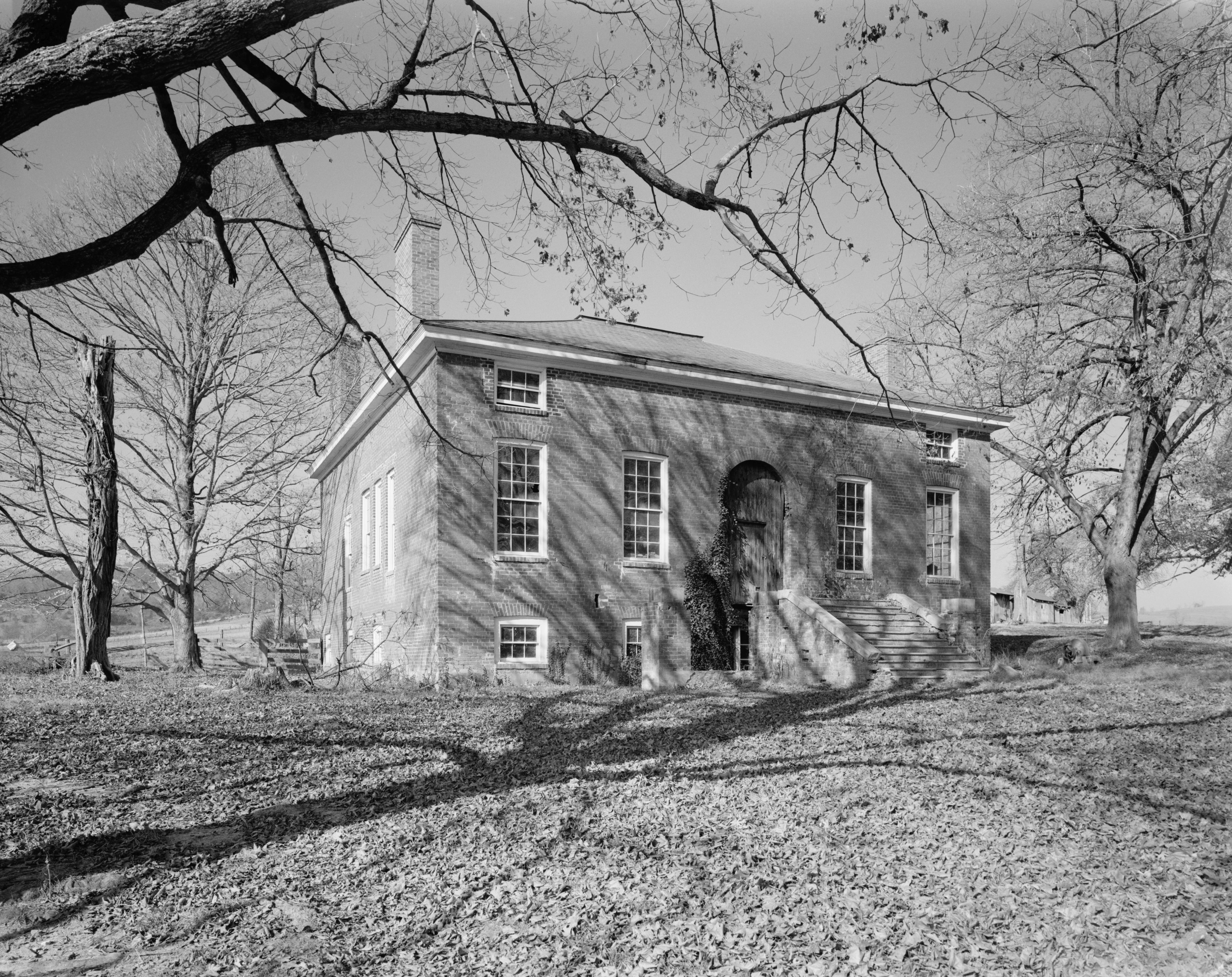
- Lynnside in Sweet Springs, 1974

- Location within West Virginia Location within the United States
- Location: Junction of WV 3 and Cove Creek Road, near Sweet Springs, West Virginia
- Coordinates: 37.6271°N 80.2502°W
- Area: 40 acres (16 ha)
- Built: 1845
- Architectural style: Greek Revival
- NRHP reference No.: 91000452
- Added to NRHP: April 26, 1991

Lynnside Historic District is a national historic district located near Sweet Springs, Monroe County, West Virginia. The district includes six contributing buildings, three contributing sites, and two contributing structures. It consists of three contiguous properties related to the Lewis family home, known as "Lynnside."

The main house was built in 1845 on the site of a previous plantation house, probably by enslaved people owned by the Lewis family, and is a 1 1/2-story, rectangular masonry dwelling in the Greek Revival style. It measures 70 feet by 40 feet. Governor John Floyd died at Lynnside while visiting his daughter, Letitia, and son-in-law, William Lynn Lewis, and was buried in Lewis Family Cemetery there. The house and other buildings on the plantation were heavily vandalized by Union soldiers during the Civil War due to its association with Confederate general John B. Floyd. A fire in 1933, caused by a lightning strike, gutted the house, destroying its roof and porticoes. Miscommunication resulted in firefighters first going to Lindside, some 30 miles away; by the time they arrived at the manor it could not be saved. Although the then-owner, Coralie Lewis, was able to re-roof the house and reinstall windows, interior floors, and partitions, the restoration ran out of funds in the early 1950s. Since then, it has fallen into disrepair. Plans to restore the building exist, but have not been implemented as of 2026 due to a lack of funding. The house has become overgrown, and is listed on the Preservation Alliance of West Virginia's endangered properties list.

Also on the property are four wooden barns dated to about 1900. The Lewis Family Cemetery contains the graves of many Lewis family members, family servants, and slaves. Given the family's Catholic faith, land adjacent to the cemetery was given to the church in 1882, this "Old Catholic Cemetery" contains the graves of Irish and German Catholics who moved to the area to assist in turnpike and railroad construction. The district also includes St. John's Catholic Chapel (1853-1859), a simple masonry Greek Revival style building which was restored in 1982, and the adjacent "New Cemetery", which was founded in the 1940s.

It was listed on the National Register of Historic Places in 1991.
