= Floyds Fork =

Coordinates: 37.9988°N 85.6781°W

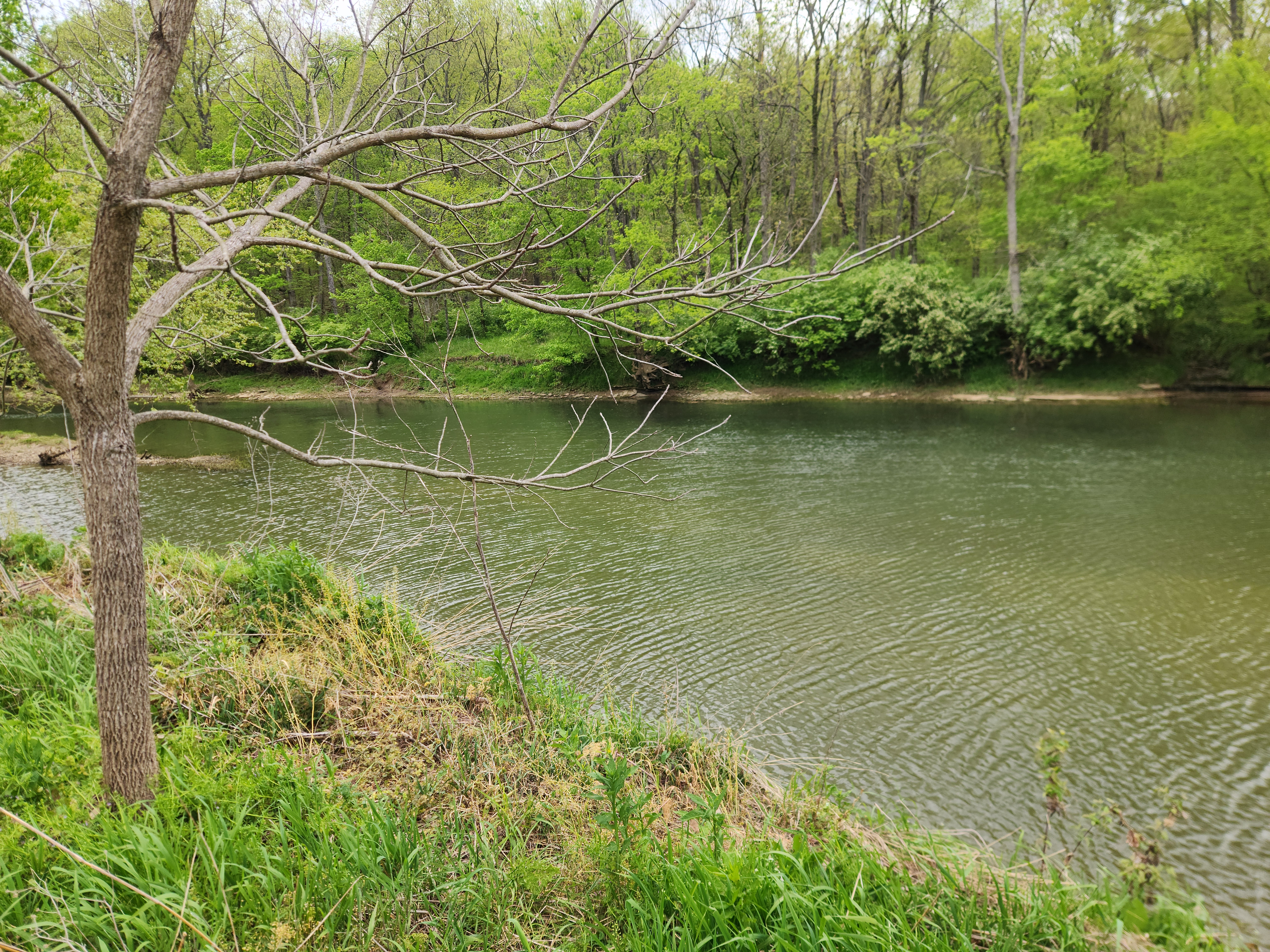
- Floyd's Fork in Kentucky

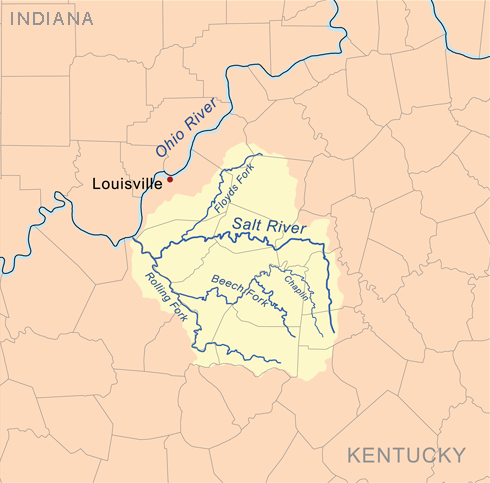
- Salt River watershed

Location
- Country: United States

Physical characteristics
- Source
  - location: Smithfield, Kentucky
  - elevation: 886 feet (270 m)
- Mouth
  - location: Bullitt County, Kentucky
- Length: 62-mile-long (100 km)
- Discharge
  - location: Shepherdsville, Kentucky

Floyds Fork is a 62-mile-long (100 km) tributary of the Salt River in Kentucky, directly south and east of Louisville. It begins in Henry County, near Smithfield Kentucky, flows through eastern Jefferson County and flows into the Salt River near Shepherdsville in Bullitt County.

It runs for about 30 miles (48 km) through Jefferson County and drains approximately 122 square miles (320 km^{2}), making it the largest watershed in the county. It is also the least environmentally compromised watershed in the county, according to the Metropolitan Sewer District, as large-scale development in the southeastern portions of Jefferson County is still relatively sparse. To preserve its rural character, much of Floyds Fork south of I-64 was zoned rural residential in 1993.

At Mount Washington, Floyds Fork has a discharge of approximately 387 cubic feet per second.

The City of Parks initiative by Louisville purchased 2,000 acres (8.1 km^{2}) of land along the river and established four parks, as well as hiking and other recreational trails.

Floyds Fork is named for John Floyd, an early surveyor of the area. During the Civil War, Confederate and Union forces skirmished on Floyds Fork and what is now US 60 (Shelbyville Road, locally) on October 1, 1862.

== The Parklands of Floyds Fork ==
In August 2010, Louisville's newest public parks system was named according to the waterways, the one unifying feature that ties the four primary parks together, and that runs through and unites the nearly 4,000 acres (16 km^{2}) of park system being created in the eastern and southeastern part of the county;

- Beckley Creek Park – 616 acres (2.49 km^{2}), encompassing the existing Miles Park at Shelbyville Rd. and stretching to South English Station and Echo Trail. A major highlight of the park is the 22-acre great-lawn, that is encircled by a walking path and park drive, and named the "Egg Lawn", which gets its name from its shape. It has excellent wooded and groomed trails for running and biking. A picturesque setting for any family outing as well.
- Pope Lick Park – 575 acres (2.33 km^{2}), just south of Beckley Creek Park, stretching south approximately 4.5 miles (7.2 km) to near Thurman Rd., and incorporating the existing Floyds Fork Park off Taylorsville Rd.
- Turkey Run Park – 1,076 acres (4.35 km^{2}), stretching 4 miles (6.4 km) from Seatonville Road to Broad Run Rd.
- Broad Run Park – 685 acres (2.77 km^{2}), south of Turkey Run Park and stretching south to Bardstown Rd.

A 3.5-mile-long (5.6 km) narrow strip of connecting land between Pope Lick Park and Turkey Run Park, called "The Strand", will encompass another 353 acres (1.43 km^{2}).

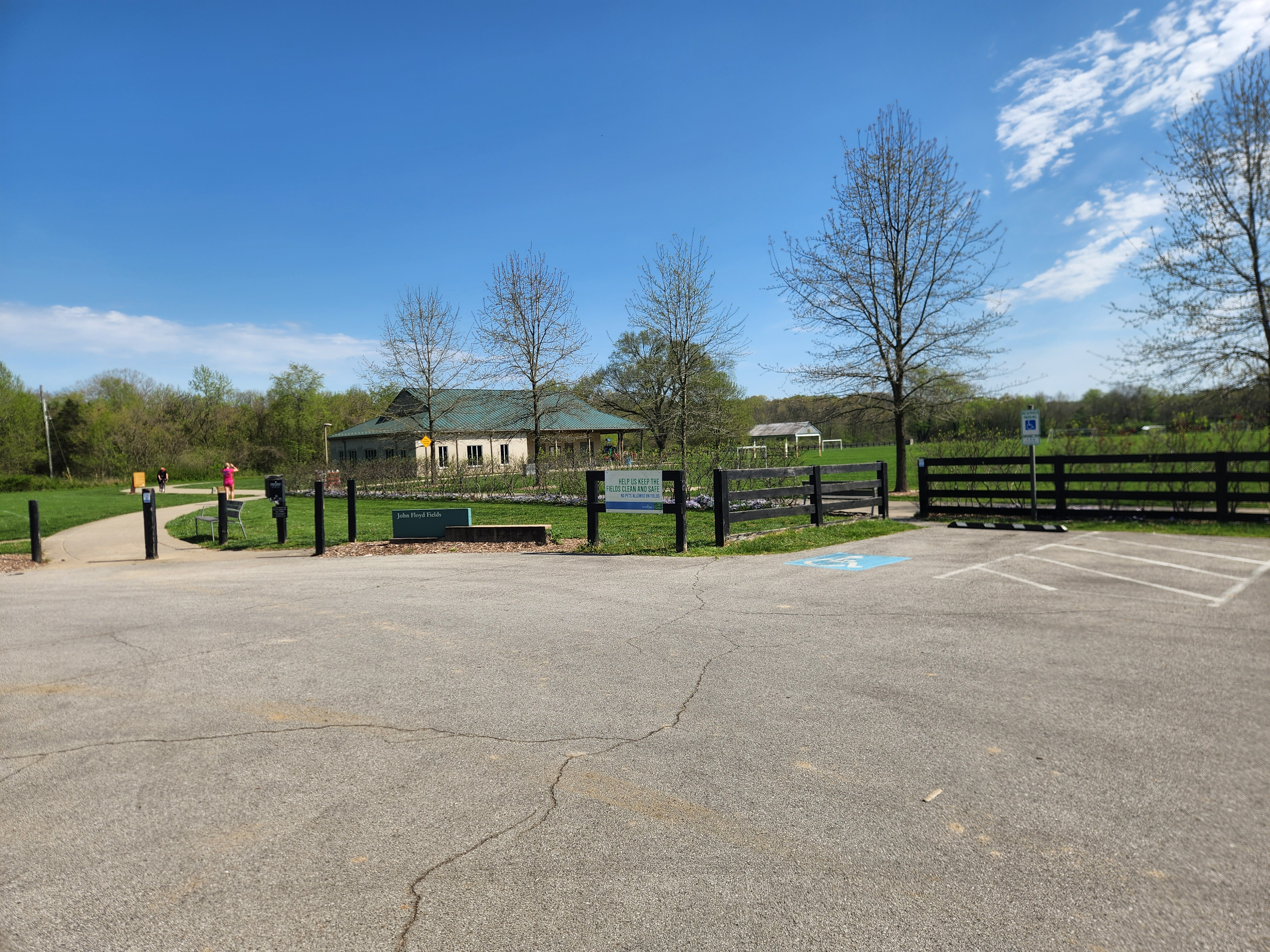
Pope Lick Park in April 2024

Turkey Run Park will be the city's second-largest park, behind the Jefferson Memorial Forest.

The Parklands of Floyds Fork are operated by Louisville nonprofit, 21st Century Parks. The new park system relies on donor-support, memberships, and an endowment for annual operations.

In recent years, the area surrounding Floyds Fork has been subject to new property development. In order to protect the tributary from developers, the Future Fund has purchased 115 acres of land, which were otherwise going to become a subdivision. The aim of this organisation is to preserve the creek by making sure it is only being used for recreation, reducing private development to a minimum.

== See also ==
- List of rivers of Kentucky
- City of Parks
- Geography of Louisville, Kentucky
- List of attractions and events in the Louisville metropolitan area
- List of parks in the Louisville metropolitan area
