= Spring Station, Kentucky =

Unincorporated community in Kentucky, United States

Spring Station
- Unincorporated community
- Location within the state of Kentucky Spring Station (the United States)
- Coordinates: 38.1542°N 84.7440°W
- Country: United States
- State: Kentucky
- County: Woodford
- Elevation: 814 ft (248 m)
- Time zone: UTC-6 (Central (est))
  - Summer (DST): UTC-5 (CST)
- GNIS feature ID: 504150

Spring Station, Kentucky is an unincorporated community in the northern part of Woodford County, Kentucky located approximately three miles west of Midway. The area is said to have been settled during the early part of the 19th century and it became a station stop on the Lexington and Ohio Railroad line when it was opened through the village in 1833.

According to the University of Kentucky, it "was named for several nearby springs and may also have been known as Big Spring Station." A postal outlet operated at Spring Station from year 1856 to 1973.

Spring Station was home to the Woodburn Stud, a thoroughbred and standardbred horse breeding operation built by Robert A. Alexander which became the birthplace of Kentucky's Thoroughbred industry.

In 1869, Daniel Swigert, who bred three Kentucky Derby winners, built a 300-acre (1.2 km^{2}) thoroughbred horse breeding business at Spring Station he named Stockwood Farm.
