= Fort William (Kentucky) =

Coordinates: 38.2487°N 85.6033°W

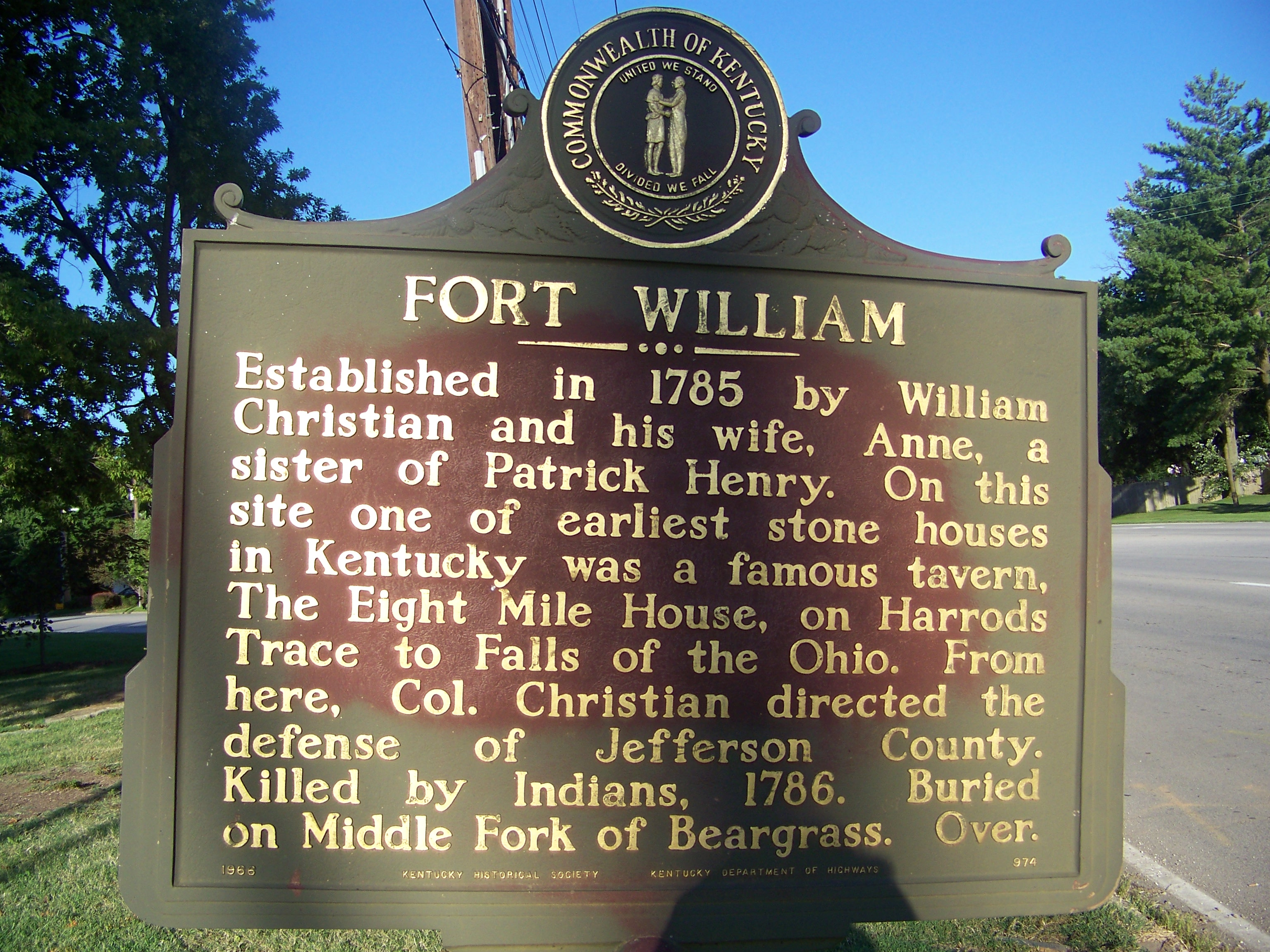
Historical marker for Fort William

Fort William was a pioneer fort in Kentucky established in 1785 by Colonel William Christian and Anne Christian. William Christian directed the defense of what is now Louisville from attacks by the Indians. The fort was in the area of Jefferson County near St. Matthews and Lyndon. Although the historical marker for Fort William is located in front of the Eight Mile House, an early stone house and tavern, the location of the fort was actually southwest of the Eight Mile House. Fort William was another name for A'Sturgus Station built in 1779 on the Middle fork of Beargrass Creek. After Christian's death in 1786, his wife, Anne, began to refer to the site as Fort William. Anne Christian was a sister of Patrick Henry. The land acquired by the Christians was payment for his service during the Seven Years' War. They moved into the area with children and slaves. After William Christian's death, Anne moved to Mercer County. However, she was ill and traveled to the West Indies in hopes it would improve her health. In 1790, she died either on the return trip from Antigua or the day after arriving in Norfolk, Virginia.

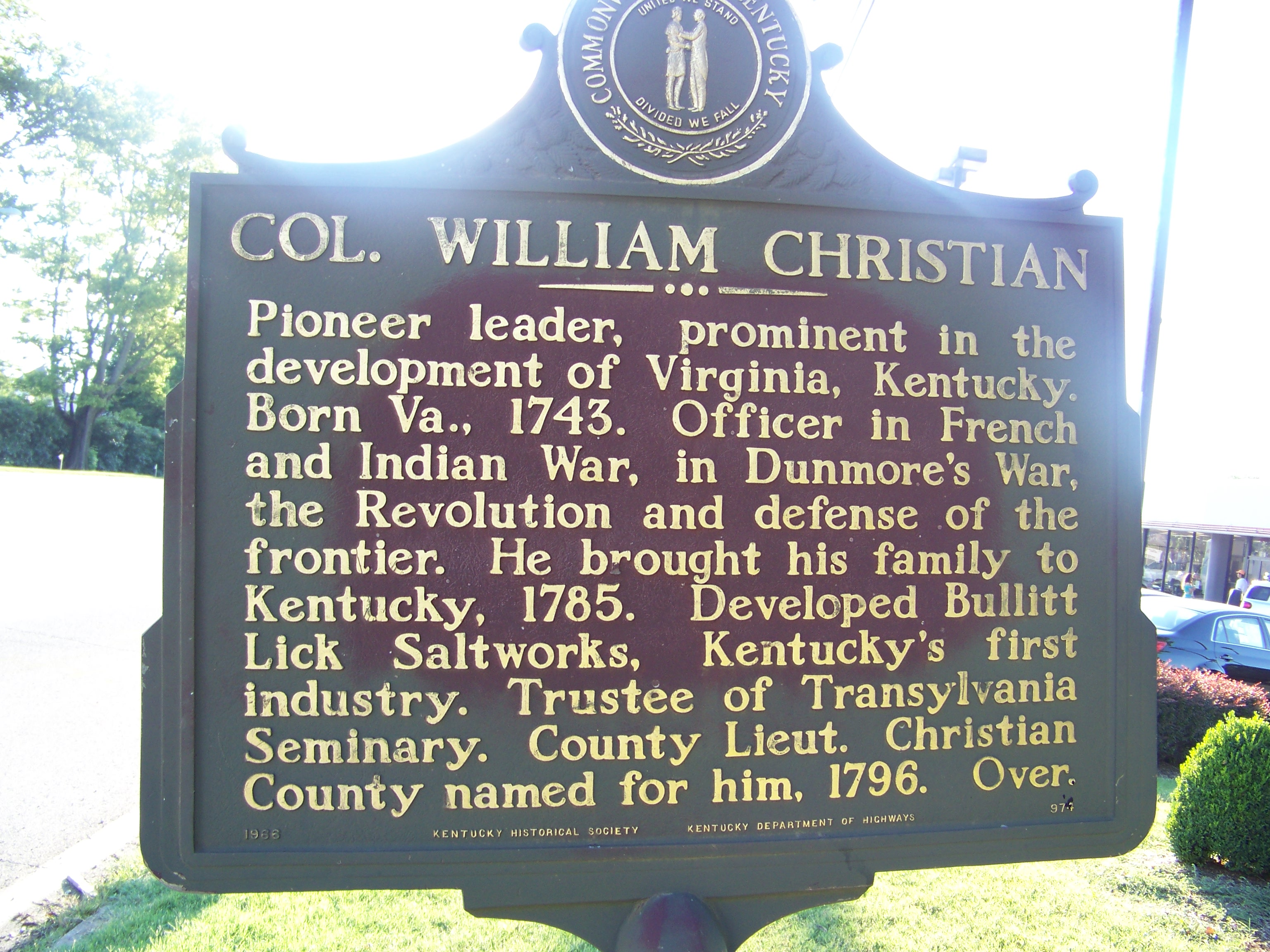
Historical marker for Col. William Christian

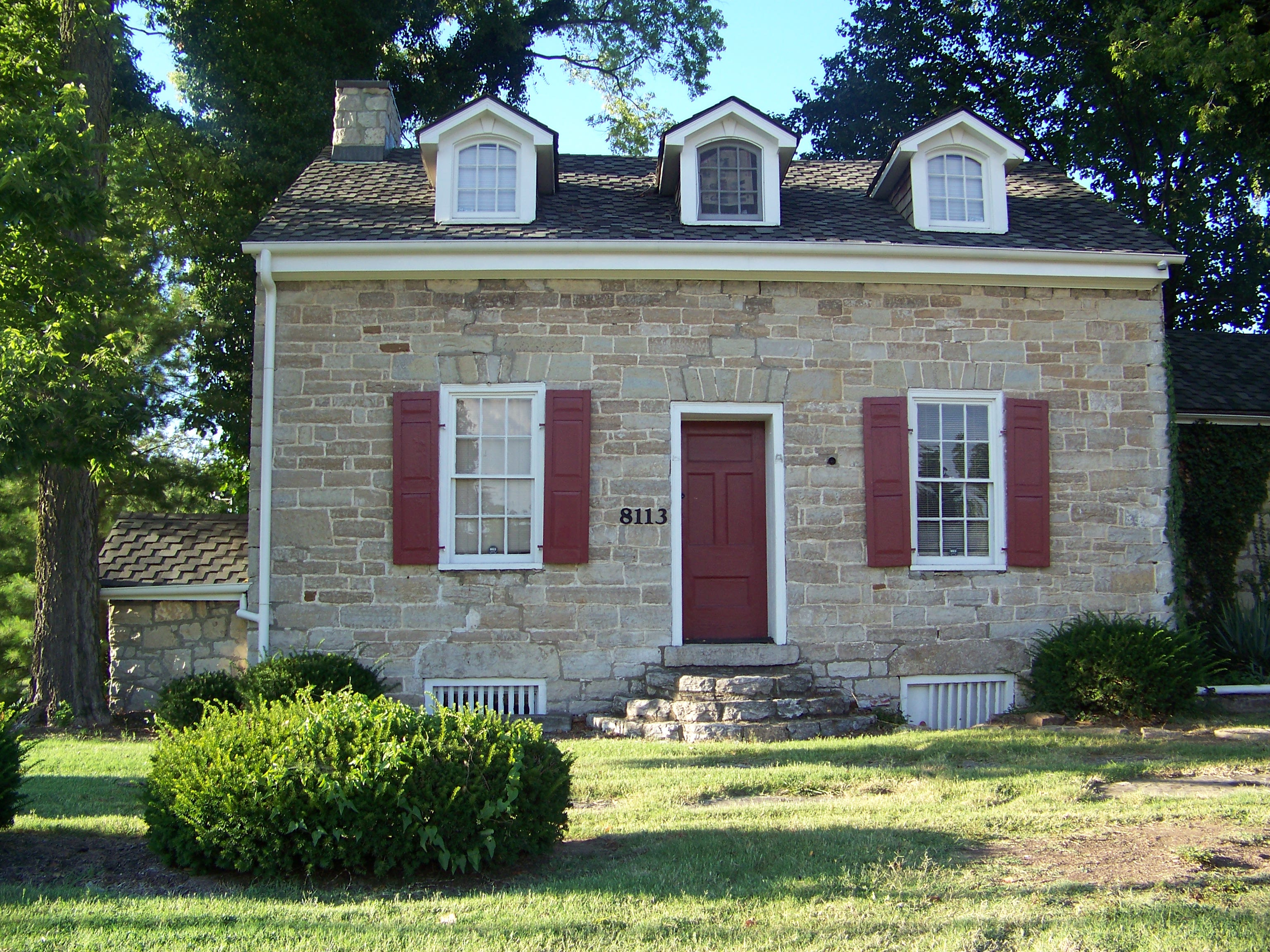
Eight Mile House
