= Corn Island (Kentucky) =

Former island in Kentucky, US

Coordinates: 38°15′44″N 85°45′33″W

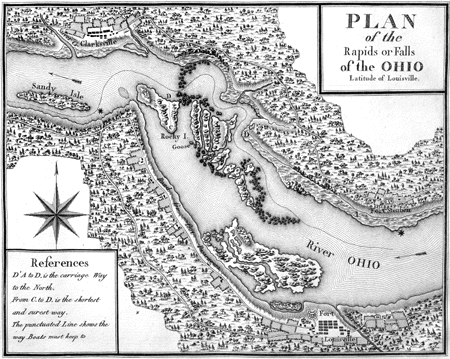
An early map of the Falls of the Ohio, Corn Island is seen in the lower center

Corn Island, formerly Dunmore's Island, was an island in the Ohio River at head of the Falls of the Ohio, just north of Louisville, Kentucky. Estimates of the size of Corn Island, now submerged, vary with time, as it gradually was eroded and became submerged. A 1780 survey listed its size at 43 acres (170,000 m^{2}). It then extended from what is now Louisville's Fourth to Fourteenth Streets. The first settlement that later became Louisville on the mainland was established on the island in 1778 by George Rogers Clark.

== History ==
Corn Island was first surveyed in 1773 by Virginia Captain Thomas Bullitt's party and called Dunmore's Island (after John Murray, 4th Earl of Dunmore, Crown Governor of Virginia). Surveying expeditions like that helped to provoke Dunmore's War the following year.

During the American Revolutionary War, the island was settled on May 27, 1778, by George Rogers Clark's militia and 60 civilian settlers, who remained behind when Clark's party departed on June 24. Among the surviving names of the families are those of Captain James Patton, Richard Chenoweth, John Tuel, William Faith, and John McManus. Clark established the farming colony on the island as a communication post to support his famous military campaign in the Illinois Country.

Shortly after Roger's departure, Colonel David Rogers and Captain Robert Benham land there on their way to New Orleans to meet with the Spanish governor. In October 1779, both made another short visit to the island on their return trip. When leaving the island a few days later, the group was attacked by Simon Girty opposite Dayton, Kentucky.

The island was renamed Corn Island by Clark, presumably reflecting the early importance of farming. The agricultural name also might have helped further the ruse that it was intended purely as a farming settlement, not as a military post. The settlers remained long after Clark's campaign ended. They moved to the mainland the following year and established Louisville, which traces its foundation in 1778 to the settlement on Corn Island. The island continued to be used for farming and hunting until it was submerged.

According to the Draper Manuscripts, which document the earliest pioneer settlers on Corn Island, the first documented non-Native American children born in Kentucky were Isaac Kimbley, born to Andrew Kimbley (1737–1834) and Sarah "Sallie" Bromley Kimbley (1755–1822). Andrew Kimbley fought alongside General George Rogers Clark and was later granted a land grant in Kentucky by Clark.

Corn Island was abandoned after 1779 with the establishment of a settlement, named Louisville, on the mainland.

From early as 1806, deforestation, erosion, and the mining of its limestone caused the island's footprint to shrink and threatened it with submersion. The Louisville Cement Company extracted rock for cement in the 19th century, and the removal of trees from the island contributed to erosion. By 1889, all that remained was its bedrock base. To improve navigation, from 1889 to 1891, the Army Corps of Engineers blasted and excavated the rock base of the island until it was submerged. The island was flooded by the construction of a dam in the 1920s. It now lies permanently underwater.

== Legacy ==
The annual Corn Island Storytelling Festival in September takes its name from the subject landmark. There is also a Sea Scout Group named The Corn Island Pirates in Louisville as well as a cultural resources survey company named Corn Island Archaeology, LLC.

== See also ==
- Fort Nelson (Kentucky)
- Fort-on-Shore
- History of Louisville, Kentucky
