= Fort Nelson (Kentucky) =

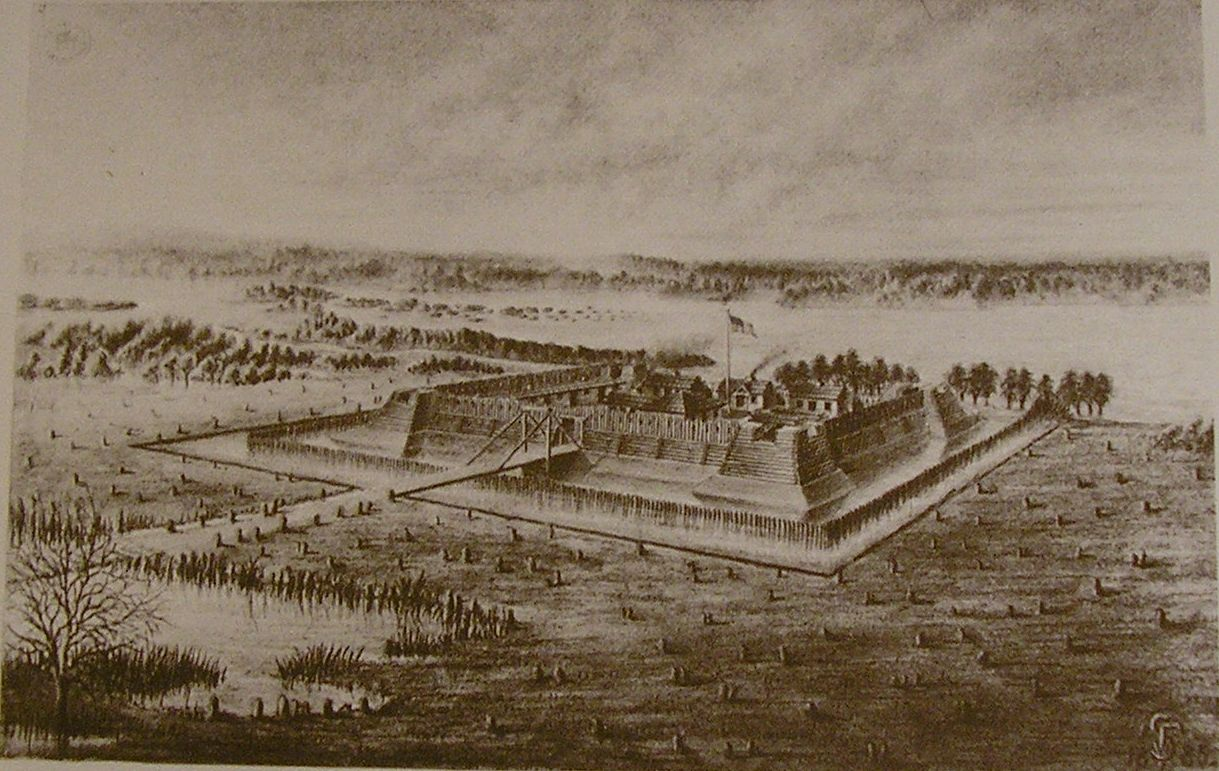
1885 sketch of the fort, made for history writer Reuben Durrett

Fort Nelson, built in 1781 by troops under George Rogers Clark including Captain Richard Chenoweth, was the second on-shore fort on the Ohio River in the area of what is now downtown Louisville, Kentucky. Fort-on-Shore, the downriver and first on-shore fort, had proved to be insufficient barely three years after it was established. In response to continuing attacks from Native Americans and the threat of British attacks during the Revolutionary War, Fort Nelson was constructed between what is currently Main Street and the river, with its main gate near Seventh Street. It was named after Thomas Nelson Jr., then the governor of Virginia. (Kentucky was part of Virginia at the time.)

The fort was used as a courthouse and jail until one was built. The fort was garrisoned until the building of Fort Finney across the river at the site of what is today Jeffersonville, Indiana about 1784. Ironically, the fort was built late in the Revolutionary War when the need for it had almost disappeared. By the late 1780s there were reports that the fort had been abandoned and was in poor condition.

Fort Nelson Park stands in the vicinity today, a pocket park housing a granite monument commemorating the fort.

== Fort-on-Shore ==
Fort-on-Shore (38°15.560′N 85°46.148′W), built in 1778 by William Linn, was the first on-shore fort on the Ohio River in the area of what is now downtown Louisville. George Rogers Clark had directed Linn to move the militia post to the mainland from its original off-shore location at Corn Island. The fort was located near the current intersection of Twelfth and Rowan Streets.

== See also ==
- History of Louisville, Kentucky
