= National Register of Historic Places listings in Bullitt County, Kentucky =

Location of Bullitt County in Kentucky

This is a list of the National Register of Historic Places listings in Bullitt County, Kentucky.

It is intended to be a complete list of the properties and districts on the National Register of Historic Places in Bullitt County, Kentucky, United States. The locations of National Register properties and districts for which the latitude and longitude coordinates are included below, may be seen in an online map.

There are 11 properties and districts listed on the National Register in the county.

This National Park Service list is complete through NPS recent listings posted December 12, 2025.

== Current listings ==
	Name on the Register	Image	Date listed	Location	City or town	Description
1	Ashworth Rock Shelters Site		September 11, 1975 (#75000739)	At the foot of McDonald's Knob, along Floyds Fork; 38°00′45″N 85°41′45″W	Shepherdsville	
2	Bank of the Commonwealth	Bank of the Commonwealth	January 8, 1987 (#87000173)	Buckman St. 37°59′13″N 85°43′02″W	Shepherdsville	
3	Henry J. Barnes House	Henry J. Barnes House	March 1, 1993 (#93000049)	144 N. Bardstown Rd. 38°02′55″N 85°32′32″W	Mount Washington	
4	T. Jeremiah Beam House		October 15, 1987 (#87001854)	Big Level Rd. 37°55′51″N 85°39′12″W	Clermont	
5	Solomon Neill Brooks House	Solomon Neill Brooks House	April 10, 1980 (#80001488)	4893 North Preston Highway, Shepherdsville (N of Shepherdsville) at John Harper (KY 1526) and Preston Highways (KY 61), south of and adjacent to Schoppenhorst Underwood-Brooks funeral home 38°03′09″N 85°40′48″W	Shepherdsville	
6	Camp Crescendo		January 17, 2025 (#100011306)	1480 Pine Tavern Rd. 37°51′05″N 85°42′18″W	Lebanon Junction	
7	Henry Crist House		January 8, 1987 (#87000215)	Maraman Ln. off Kentucky Route 1604; 37°57′22″N 85°34′09″W	Brownington	
8	Lebanon Junction Historic District		December 4, 2003 (#03001224)	Roughly bounded by Maple St., Kentucky Route 61, Knoxville Ave., and Harrel and Masden Sts. 37°49′55″N 85°43′53″W	Lebanon Junction	
9	James M. Lloyd House	James M. Lloyd House	February 11, 1993 (#93000048)	Northeastern corner of the junction of U.S. Route 31E and East St. 38°02′51″N 85°32′25″W	Mount Washington	
10	Louisville to Bardstown Turnpike Milestones and Roadbed		July 12, 2019 (#100004215)	Along and near US 31E from Louisville to Bardstown; 38°03′10″N 85°32′14″W	Louisville	
11	Zack Stansbury House	Zack Stansbury House	February 11, 1993 (#93000047)	1430 Bardstown Rd. 38°01′59″N 85°31′43″W	Mount Washington	

== See also ==
- List of National Historic Landmarks in Kentucky
- List of attractions and events in the Louisville metropolitan area
