= Fox Chase, Kentucky =

- City
- Location of Fox Chase in Bullitt County, Kentucky.
- Coordinates: 38°02′45″N 85°41′28″W
- Country: United States
- State: Kentucky
- County: Bullitt

Area
  - Total: 0.39 sq mi (1.01 km^{2})
  - Land: 0.38 sq mi (0.99 km^{2})
  - Water: 0.0077 sq mi (0.02 km^{2})
- Elevation: 515 ft (157 m)

Population (2020)
  - Total: 436
  - Density: 1,142.6/sq mi (441.16/km^{2})
- Time zone: UTC-5 (Eastern (EST))
  - Summer (DST): UTC-4 (EDT)
- ZIP code: 40165
- Area code: 502
- FIPS code: 21-28785
- GNIS feature ID: 2403655
- Website: foxchase1.weebly.com

Fox Chase is a home rule-class city in Bullitt County, Kentucky, in the United States. It was formally incorporated by the state assembly in 1983. The population was 436 as of the 2020 census, down from 447 in the 2010 census.

== Geography ==
Fox Chase is located in northern Bullitt County 16 miles (26 km) south of downtown Louisville. It is bordered on its west side by Interstate 65, with the closest access from Exit 121 (John Harper Highway) 0.5 miles (0.80 km) north of Fox Chase. Surrounding communities include the city of Hillview, with land to the north, southeast, and west; the city of Hebron Estates to the east; and unincorporated Brooks to the west of I-65.

According to the United States Census Bureau, Fox Chase has a total area of 0.39 square miles (1.0 km^{2}), of which 0.008 square miles (0.02 km^{2}), or 1.72%, is water.

== Demographics ==
Historical population
Census	Pop.	Note	%±
1990	528		—
2000	476		−9.8%
2010	447		−6.1%
2020	436		−2.5%
U.S. Decennial Census

As of the census of 2000, there were 476 people, 176 households, and 162 families residing in the city. The population density was 1,416.8 inhabitants per square mile (547.0/km^{2}). There were 176 housing units at an average density of 523.8 per square mile (202.2/km^{2}). The racial makeup of the city was 99.79% White, and 0.21% from two or more races.

There were 176 households, out of which 27.8% had children under the age of 18 living with them, 87.5% were married couples living together, 2.8% had a female householder with no husband present, and 7.4% were non-families. 6.8% of all households were made up of individuals, and 2.3% had someone living alone who was 65 years of age or older. The average household size was 2.70 and the average family size was 2.81.

In the city the population was spread out, with 19.1% under the age of 18, 7.8% from 18 to 24, 19.5% from 25 to 44, 46.4% from 45 to 64, and 7.1% who were 65 years of age or older. The median age was 47 years. For every 100 females, there were 102.6 males. For every 100 females age 18 and over, there were 107.0 males.

The median income for a household in the city was $73,750, and the median income for a family was $75,790. Males had a median income of $50,781 versus $32,250 for females. The per capita income for the city was $30,371. None of the population or families were below the poverty line.
