= Hillview, Kentucky =

- City
- Location of Hillview in Bullitt County, Kentucky.
- Coordinates: 38°01′29″N 85°39′57″W
- Country: United States
- State: Kentucky
- County: Bullitt
- Incorporated: March 28, 1974

Government
  - Type: Mayor-Council
  - Mayor: James Eadens

Area
  - Total: 6.61 sq mi (17.11 km^{2})
  - Land: 6.51 sq mi (16.86 km^{2})
  - Water: 0.097 sq mi (0.25 km^{2})
- Elevation: 548 ft (167 m)

Population (2020)
  - Total: 8,622
  - Estimate (2022): 8,771
  - Density: 1,324.7/sq mi (511.46/km^{2})
- Time zone: UTC-5 (Eastern (EST))
  - Summer (DST): UTC-4 (EDT)
- ZIP code: 40229
- Area code: 502
- FIPS code: 21-36982
- GNIS feature ID: 2404701
- Website: www.hillviewky.org

Hillview is a home rule-class city in Bullitt County, Kentucky, in the United States. The population was 8,622 as of the 2020 census, up from 8,172 at the 2010 census. The primary road through the area is Kentucky Route 61, known as Preston Highway in both Jefferson and Bullitt counties.

Long a rural farming community, Hillview was connected to what became Interstate 65 in 1954 and grew in the 1950s and 1960s as a suburb of Louisville. Its larger subdivisions included Maryville, Overdale, and Lone Acres, and they incorporated in 1974 to form the present city.

== Geography ==
Hillview is located in northern Bullitt County 15 miles (24 km) south of downtown Louisville. The northern border of Hillview is the southern border of Louisville-Jefferson County. Hillview is bordered to the east by Pioneer Village, and other nearby cities include Hunters Hollow to the west, Hebron Estates to the southeast, and Fox Chase to the south. The unincorporated community of Brooks is to the west across I-65.

According to the United States Census Bureau, the city has a total area of 3.3 square miles (8.6 km^{2}), of which 0.027 square miles (0.07 km^{2}), or 0.86%, is water.

== Demographics ==
=== 2020 census ===
As of the 2020 census, Hillview had a population of 8,622. The median age was 37.2 years. 23.6% of residents were under the age of 18 and 13.0% of residents were 65 years of age or older. For every 100 females there were 97.9 males, and for every 100 females age 18 and over there were 94.1 males age 18 and over.

98.9% of residents lived in urban areas, while 1.1% lived in rural areas.

There were 3,238 households in Hillview, of which 36.3% had children under the age of 18 living in them. Of all households, 48.2% were married-couple households, 15.8% were households with a male householder and no spouse or partner present, and 25.7% were households with a female householder and no spouse or partner present. About 22.0% of all households were made up of individuals and 8.7% had someone living alone who was 65 years of age or older.

There were 3,337 housing units, of which 3.0% were vacant. The homeowner vacancy rate was 0.8% and the rental vacancy rate was 5.2%.

Racial composition as of the 2020 census
Race	Number	Percent
White	7,692	89.2%
Black or African American	195	2.3%
American Indian and Alaska Native	16	0.2%
Asian	63	0.7%
Native Hawaiian and Other Pacific Islander	0	0.0%
Some other race	96	1.1%
Two or more races	560	6.5%
Hispanic or Latino (of any race)	333	3.9%

=== 2000 census ===
As of the census of 2000, there were 7,037 people, 2,411 households, and 2,013 families residing in the city. The population density was 1,689.7 inhabitants per square mile (652.4/km^{2}). There were 2,460 housing units at an average density of 590.7 per square mile (228.1/km^{2}). The racial makeup of the city was 97.90% White, 0.37% African American, 0.47% Native American, 0.28% Asian, 0.11% from other races, and 0.87% from two or more races. Hispanic or Latino of any race were 0.70% of the population.

There were 2,411 households, out of which 41.6% had children under the age of 18 living with them, 66.6% were married couples living together, 11.5% had a female householder with no husband present, and 16.5% were non-families. 13.1% of all households were made up of individuals, and 3.2% had someone living alone who was 65 years of age or older. The average household size was 2.92 and the average family size was 3.16.

Historical population
Census	Pop.	Note	%±
1980	5,196		—
1990	6,119		17.8%
2000	7,870		28.6%
2010	8,172		3.8%
2020	8,622		5.5%
2024 (est.)	8,962		3.9%
U.S. Decennial Census

In the city, the population was spread out, with 28.7% under the age of 18, 8.6% from 18 to 24, 34.9% from 25 to 44, 22.3% from 45 to 64, and 5.5% who were 65 years of age or older. The median age was 32 years. For every 100 females, there were 100.2 males. For every 100 females age 18 and over, there were 98.1 males.

The median income for a household in the city was $42,743, and the median income for a family was $45,594. Males had a median income of $33,962 versus $22,027 for females. The per capita income for the city was $15,832. About 5.3% of families and 7.1% of the population were below the poverty line, including 9.0% of those under age 18 and 9.3% of those age 65 or over.

== Education ==
Hillview has a public library, a branch of the Bullitt County Public Library.
