= Lebanon Branch =

Lebanon Branch may refer to:

- Lebanon Branch (Ohio) of the Pennsylvania Railroad
- Lebanon Branch (Pennsylvania) of the Pennsylvania Railroad
- Louisville and Nashville Railroad Lebanon Branch
