= GTR Patricks Vindicator =

Miniature horse

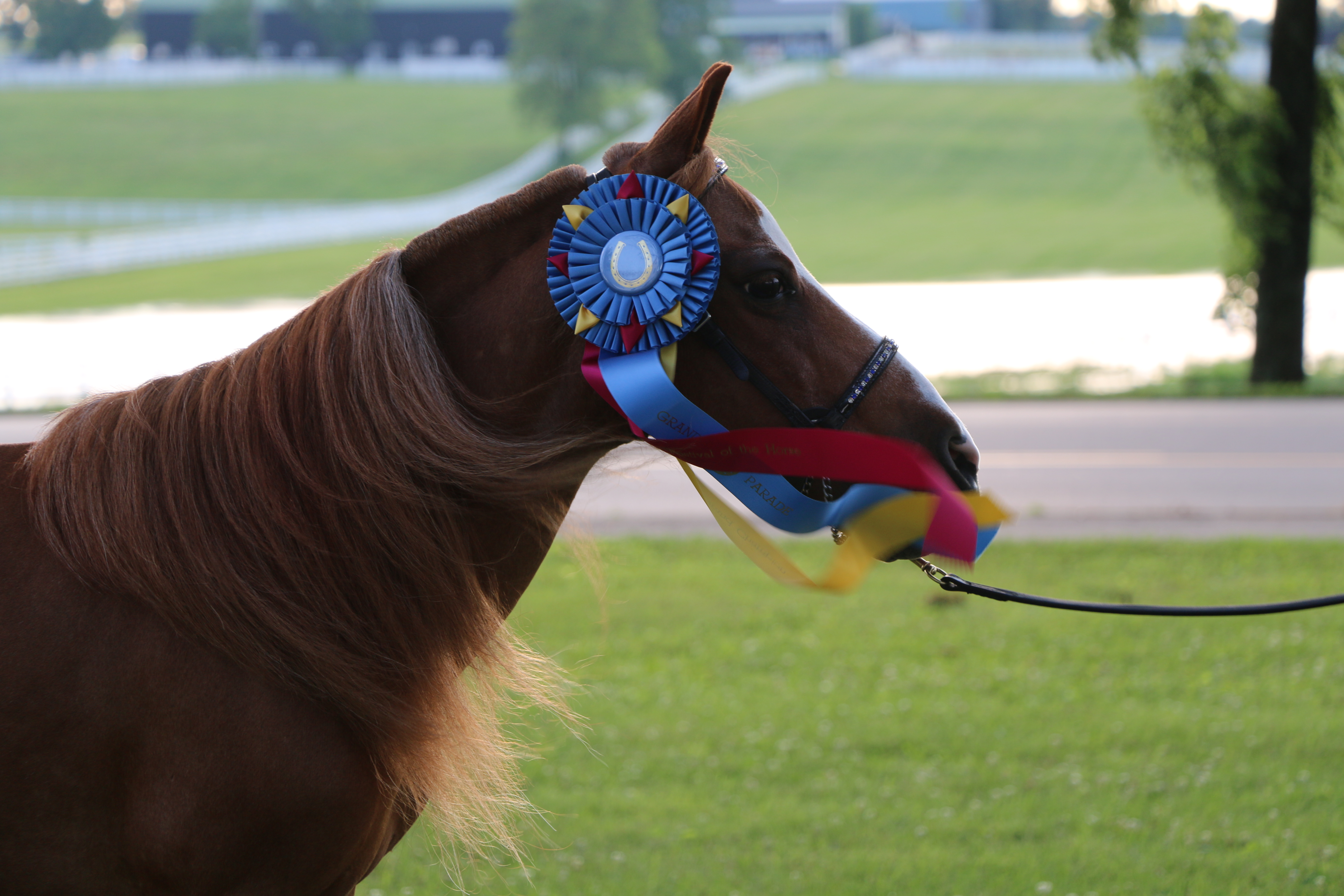
- GTR Patricks Vindicator at the KY Horse Park
- Breed: American Miniature Horse
- Discipline: Jumper, hunter, halter, showmanship, obstacle, tricks
- Sire: Wrights Vindicator
- Dam: Dell Teras Lulu
- Sex: Gelding
- Foaled: April 17, 1994 (32 years, 2 months and 25 days old)
- Country: United States
- Color: Sorrel
- Breeder: Richard and Gayle Topper
- Owner: Jessica Schaaf
- Trainer: Sarah Schaaf

Honors
- 2013 KAFHS High Point Youth Halter, 2015 KVMA Animal Hall of Fame Inductee
- Last updated on: January 26, 2016.

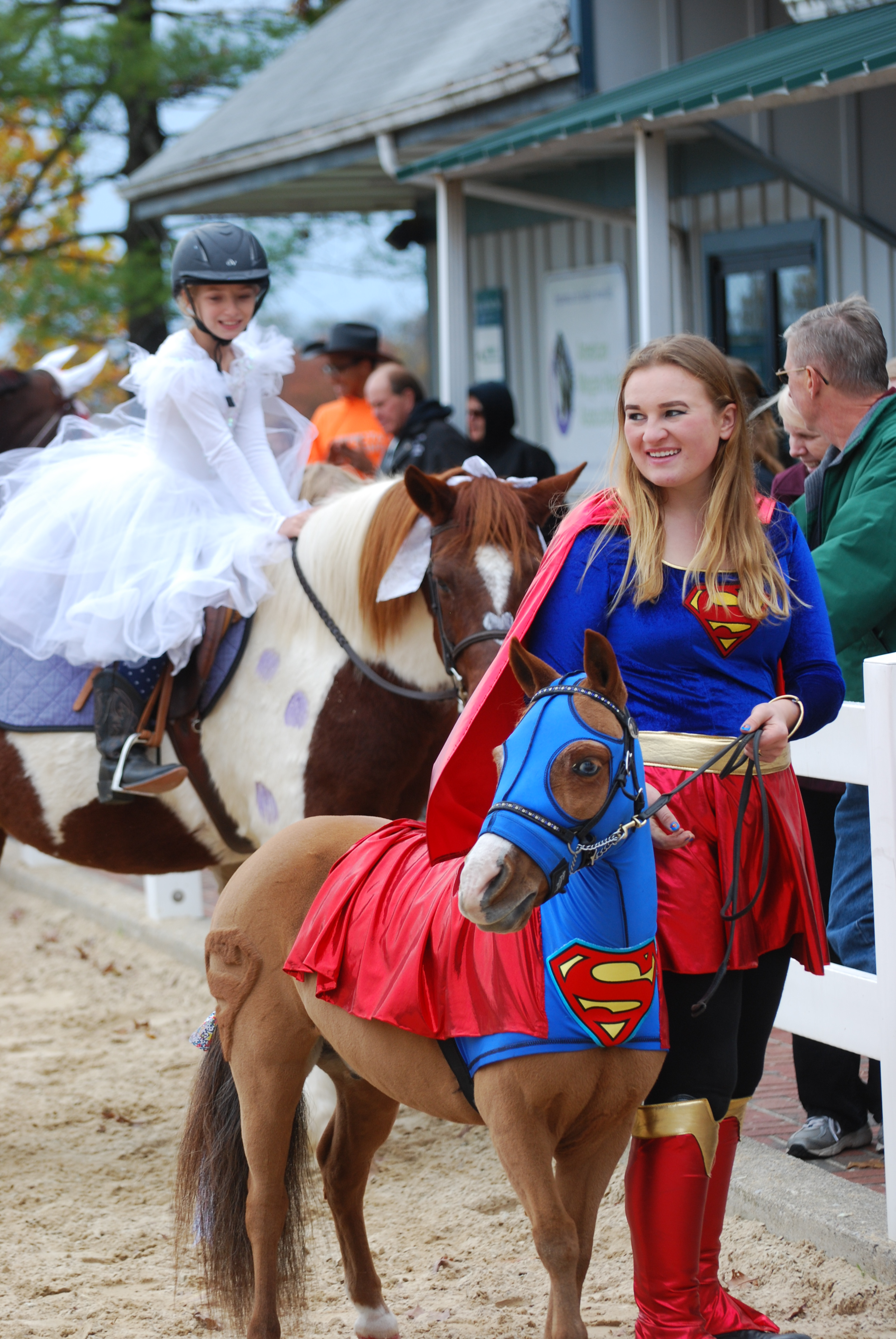
GTR Patricks Vindicator at "Hallowhinny" at the Kentucky Horse Park, 2015

GTR Patricks Vindicator (foaled April 17, 1994) is a registered American Miniature Horse gelding, foaled in South Carolina at GTR Mini Ranch. He is most commonly known as "Patrick" or "Patrick The Miniature Horse". He is a sorrel, with one blue eye (left), a blaze, and a coronet with white hoof. He measures at 33.5 inches tall, and is registered with the American Miniature Horse Association (AMHA) and the American Miniature Horse Registry (AMHR) He was purchased by Byrd's End Farm on July 4, 1998, and has been located in Shepherdsville, Kentucky ever since. He now competes at sanctioned and non-sanctioned Miniature Horse shows, performs therapy work and exhibits at notable events across Kentucky.

== Early life ==
GTR Patricks Vindicator was foaled on April 17, 1994 in South Carolina. His sire was Wrights Vindicator, and his dam was Dell Teras Lulu. He remained in South Carolina for 2–3 years, and was gelded at this time. In approximately 1997, he was sold to Roger Herald in Lagrange, Kentucky. Here, he received basic training, and was used in a petting zoo for a brief period. On July 4, 1998, Dr. Raymond and Jessica Schaaf purchased GTR Patricks Vindicator and KPM TopGun ( a pinto miniature horse) for their, then one-year-old daughter, Sarah. Between 1998 and 2002, he was trained by Jessica Schaaf to drive and be ridden. Sarah often rode him until she reached the age of seven. His driving career was cut short after he was injured in an accident- the Schaafs do not see it necessary to risk further injury.

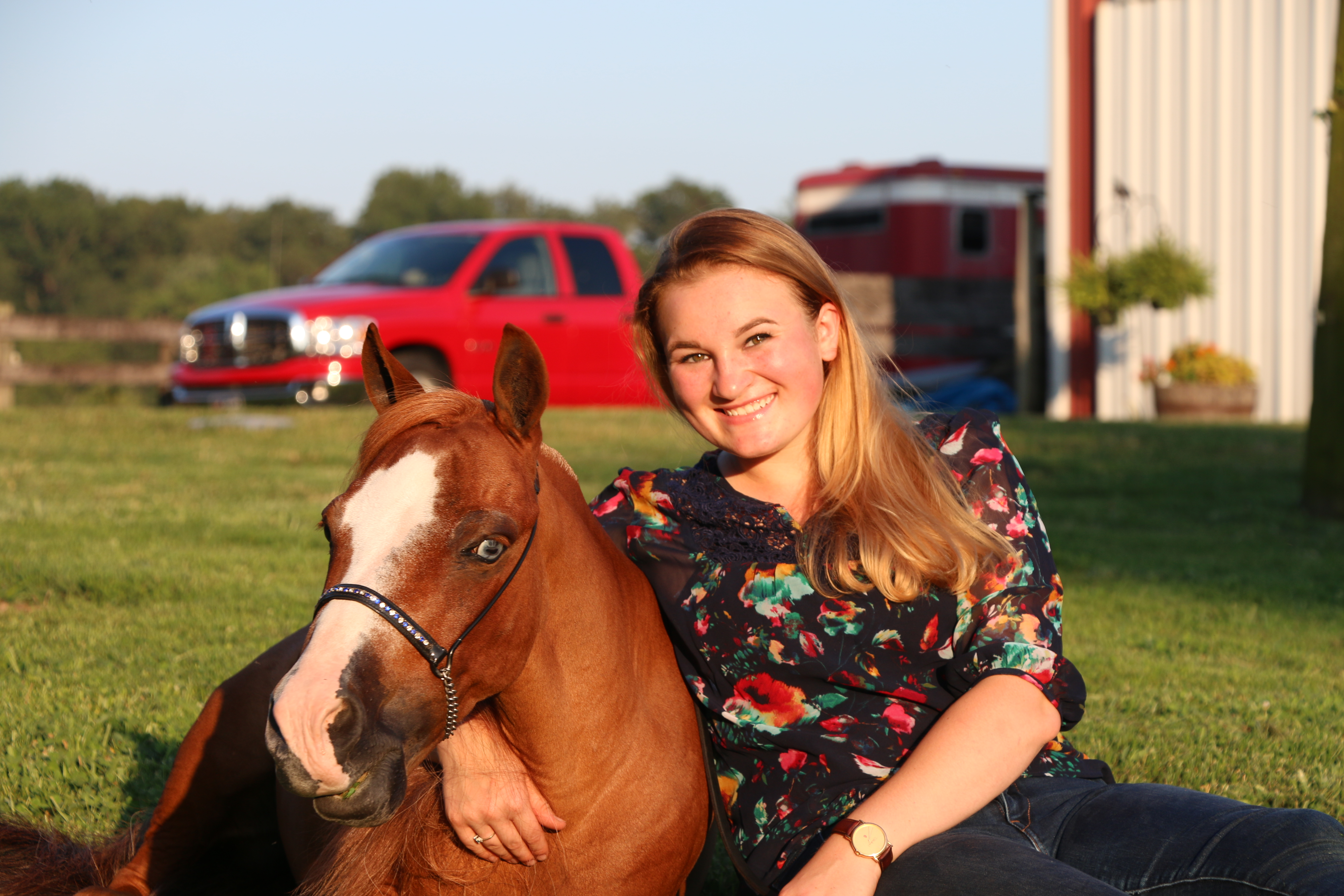
GTR Patricks Vindicator and owner, Sarah Schaaf

== Show career ==
GTR Patricks Vindicator began competing in shows in 2002. Many of the County Fairs he and Sarah compete(d) at include the Bullitt County Fair, the Oldham County Fair, the Larue County Fair, The Lawrenceburg Fair, The Spencer County Fair and the Franklin County Fair. He has also competed at the Bluegrass Classic Horse Show, held at the Kentucky State Fair from 2002–present. The Bluegrass Classic is an AMHA sanctioned show. He has competed in the following classes from 2002 until present:

- Youth Jumper – 13–18 years (2008–2015)
- Amateur Jumper (2016–)
- Open Jumper (2008–)
- Liberty (2012–)
- Senior Geldings – over 32” to 34” (2002–)
- Stock-Type Senior Geldings (2015–)
- Youth Stock-Type Geldings (2015)
- Youth Hunter – 13–18 years (2014–)
- Amateur Hunter (2016–)
- Open Hunter (2014–)
- Youth Showmanship – 8–12 years (2005–2009)
- Youth Showmanship – 13–18 years (2010–2015)
- Amateur Showmanship (2016–)
- Open Costume (2002–)
- Solid Color Stallions and Geldings (2002–)
- Youth Exhibiting A Senior Gelding – 7 years and under (2002–2004)
- Youth Exhibiting A Senior Gelding – 8–12 years (2005–2009)
- Youth Exhibiting A Senior Gelding – 13–18 years (2010–2015)

* In 2016, Sarah Schaaf is no longer eligible to compete in Youth Classes, only now eligible to compete in Amateur and open classes.

=== Awards ===
2013 High Point Youth Halter Award, Kentucky Association of Fairs and Horse Shows

== Therapy ==
GTR Patricks Vindicator is a therapy animal, registered with Pet Partners. In 2014, Sarah Schaaf completed an online handler's course that made GTR Patricks Vindicator eligible for an "evaluation". As stated on the Pet Partner's website,

"The Pet Partners Therapy Animal Program also distinguishes itself by requiring all animals to pass a skills and aptitude evaluation every two years to remain registered as a therapy animal, a practice recommended by both the International Association of Human-Animal Interaction Organizations (IAHAIO) as well as the Society for Healthcare Epidemiology of America (SHEA). However, it’s more than an evaluation for the animal. Handlers are also expected to demonstrate best practices in handling, elevating the requirements of a therapy animal team beyond basic obedience skills."

Sarah Schaaf has taken Patrick to Kindred Hospital In Louisville, Kentucky to visit patients who suffer from ALS and Multiple Sclerosis. They have also attended the Reach Out For Kosair Kids charity event. They will go re-evaluated in 2016, and hope to expand their visits to other facilities in Louisville and Lexington, Kentucky.

=== Awards ===
Inducted into the Kentucky Veterinary Medical Association's Animal Hall of Fame in 2015.

== Ambassador ==
GTR Patricks Vindicator is most well known for being an ambassador to the American Miniature Horse. According to Sarah Schaaf, many of the shows she and Patrick attended in the past have been canceled due to lack of competitors and lack of public interest in the Miniature Horse breed. Schaaf is dedicated to educating the public about the many disciplines Miniature Horses are capable of participating in, and their gentle dispositions. She hopes to create more public interest in the breed, and hopefully reboot many of the events held in Kentucky in the future. She also believes that, because of Patrick's size, he is ideal to introduce the public to horses, in general.

"Patrick is a seasoned veteran and loves to meet people and promote the breed as well as horses in general. Whereas many of the larger horse breeds are intimidating, everyone loves to come and pet Patrick and realize that horses aren’t scary at all!"

GTR Patricks Vindicator has attended the following events to demonstrate the versatility of the American Miniature Horse:

- Breyerfest (2008, 2009, 2010, 2011, 2012, 2013, 2014, 2015, 2016)
- Secretariat Festival (2009, 2010, 2011, 2012, 2013, 2014, 2015, 2016) – GTR Patricks Vindicator is the "mascot" of the Bourbon County Secretariat Festival
- KY Derby Parade (2010)
- Georgetown Festival of the Horse Parade (2008, 2009, 2010, 2012, 2016)
- Rolex Kentucky Three Day Event (2015, 2016)
- CP National Horse Show (2015, 2016)
- KY Horse Park Breeds Barn Show (2015, 2016)
- Bluegrass Festival (2015, 2016)
- Reach Out For Kosair Kids Charity Event (2015)
- Churchill Downs Family Fun Day (2015)
- Keeneland Paddock Demonstration (2015)

* Some events may be added in 2016

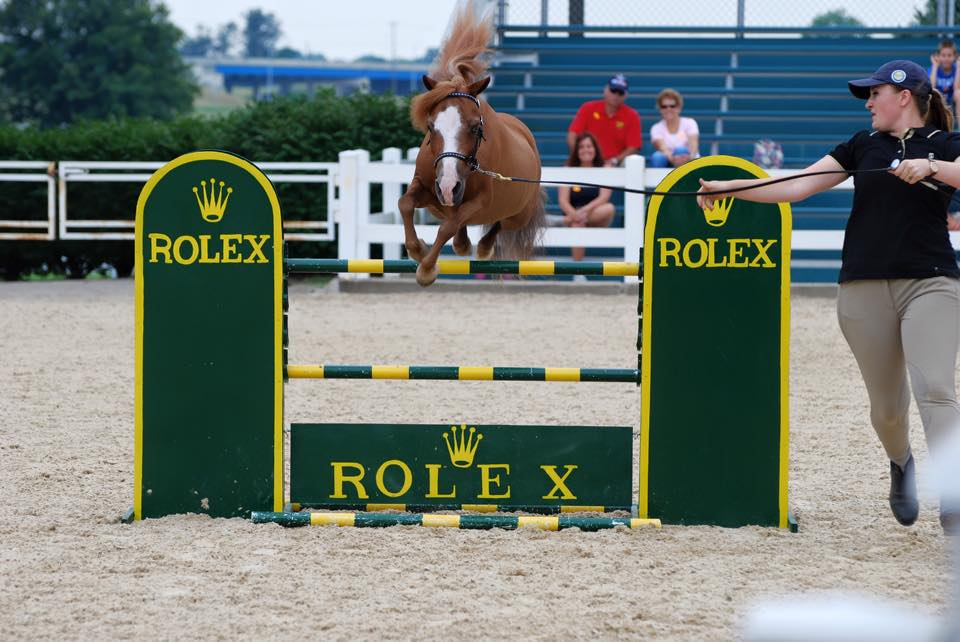
GTR Patricks Vindicator performing at the Kentucky Horse Park breeds barn, 2015

== Publications ==
In addition to promoting The American Miniature Horse at events and shows, GTR Patricks Vindicator has been featured in multiple magazines. Such publications include:

- The Journal (2010)
- Miniature Horse World (2010, 2011, 2012, 2013, 2014, 2015)
- The Paisley (2014)
- Young Rider (2014)
- Sidelines (2015)
- Rolex KY Program (2015)
- Purina Proud promotional posters (2015)
- Original song, written and performed by Jim Seekamp "Patrick The Miniature Horse"
- Featured in "Penny and Red" a documentary about the life of Penny Chenery and Triple Crown winner, Secretariat.
- Patrick will be the subject of a new illustrated children's book, to be published in the coming year.
