= Shepherdsville train wreck =

Rail accident in 1917

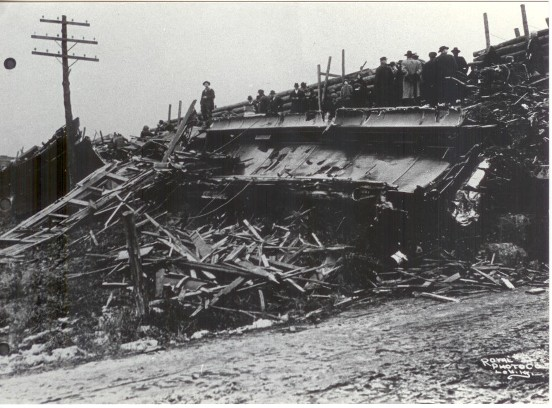
- Wreckage of a demolished car

Details
- Date: December 20, 1917; 108 years ago 5:30 p.m.
- Location: Shepherdsville, Kentucky
- Coordinates: 37°59′13″N 85°42′53″W
- Country: United States
- Line: Louisville and Nashville Railroad
- Incident type: Rear-end collision
- Cause: Failure to protect train

Statistics
- Trains: 2
- Deaths: 49
- Injured: 52

The Shepherdsville train wreck was a fatal rail accident that killed at least 49 people when an express collided with a local train at Shepherdsville, Kentucky on December 20, 1917. It was the deadliest train wreck in Kentucky's history. Blame was chiefly attributed to negligence by the driver and flagman of the local train, though the standard signalling routines were also found to be inadequate.

== Casualty report ==
The collision at Shepherdsville, Kentucky on the Louisville and Nashville Railroad killed 49 people (some sources say 51), and left a similar number seriously injured. It is the worst and deadliest train wreck of Kentucky's history.

== Incident ==
A local train No.41, known as the Accommodation, departed Union Station in Louisville at 4:35 pm, bound for Springfield. It consisted of an engine pulling a baggage car, a combination smoker/colored car, and a first class car. It arrived at Brooks, 14 miles from Louisville at 5:12 pm, some six minutes late, and its conductor was told by the dispatcher to let the approaching Cincinnati-to-New Orleans express train, Flyer, pass at Shepherdsville unless he could make it to Bardstown Junction. The Flyer had left Louisville at 4:53 pm, nearly two hours late; it had nine steel cars and was intending to make up time on the run south.

The local train's conductor decided to stop normally at Shepherdsville (rather than go straight into the siding) then confirm the Flyer's position before deciding whether to go back into the siding. Unfortunately when it arrived at the station at 5:24 the station operator had no news about the Flyer, so Conductor Campbell hurried to the depot for information. Meanwhile, the Flyer passed Brooks, giving four short whistle blasts to request right of way; this was granted, the signal being changed from red to green. The depot informed the Campbell that the Flyer was approaching fast so the local pulled forward in order to "back in" at the switch.

The engineer on the Flyer reported later that half a mile from Shepherdsville, "I blew four blasts for orders. I could see the signal only dimly, and it was green, our signal to proceed if we had seen it change from red to green. I did not see it change, I believed it had already changed from red to green, meaning for me to proceed". As the local threw the switch to allow it to go back into the siding the signal automatically changed the signal to red. The Flyer's engineer immediately applied the emergency brakes but it was too late. It struck the rear of the wooden framed local at a speed of 25 mph. The engine continued to the entire length of the rear car, "shattering it completely" and continued through half the length of the smoker, though itself was not derailed. The force of the collision drove the local forward a distance of 800 feet.

A relief train arrived before 7 p.m. with 11 Louisville doctors and several surgeons, but it was nearly midnight before the last of the mangled bodies was removed from the splintered wreckage; some were unrecognisable.

== Those killed or injured ==
The following people are known to have died in this train wreck.

Father Eugene A. Bertello, Joshua Bethel Bowles, Hollis Bridges, Miss Josie Bridges, Mahlon H. Campbell, Carrie B. Cherry, Redford Columbus Cherry Sr., Redford Columbus Cherry Jr., Raymond Thomas Cravens, George C. Duke, Virginia Frances Duke, Lawrence C. Greenwell, Henry Z. Hardaway, Mattie E. Harmon, Joseph Raoul Losson Hurst, Louisa B. Hurst, Mrs. Catharine "Kate" A. Ice, W. C. Johnson, Silas "Sil" C. Lawrence, David Maraman, Emily Haycraft Mashburn, Miss Elizabeth McElroy, Amelia Miller, Lillian Miller, Mabel Brown Miller, W. McMakin Miller, Garnette McKay Moore, Lucas Moore, James Hartwell Morrison, Cora May Muir, George Shadburne Muir, Nathaniel Wickliffe Muir, Frank L. Nunn, Estella B. Nutt, Forrest L. Overall, Maggie Mae Overall, Bettie Phillips, David Phillips, John T. Phillips, Alice May Pulliam, Emory Samuels, Thomas Schaffer, Carrie May Simmons, Miss Mary Alethaire Simms, Thomas Spalding, J. W. Stansbury, Ben Talbott, James Thompson, N. H. Thompson.

These people have been identified as having sustained injuries as a result of the wreck.

Henry Bowman, James Bradbury, Margaret Bradbury, Arthur Cahoe, James Carrico, Walter Carter, Benjamin Chapeze, Ed Clarkson, Miss Anna Cravens, Eliza M. Cravens, Frank Daugherty, Dr. D. S. Dodds, Mrs. George C. Duke, John Ford, Jeff D. Gregory, Judge Nat Halstead, Natalie Halstead, Edith Hatfield, Miss Lena Hatfield, Thomas W. Hoagland, Charles Jenkins, Charles Jessie, John Keyer, Howard Maraman, Ezekiel Masden, John McClure, George Moore, Claude Lee Nutt, Daniel Nutt, C. H. Perkins, Miss Ella Phillips, J. Frank Ratcliff, Annie Reed, Leonard Riney, Lee Roby, Harry Samuels, Susie Sheckles, C. William Shelton, Charles Showalter, John Showalter, Susan S. Simmons, J. E. Smith, Michael Smith (Bullitt County), Michael Smith (Louisville), Ethel Thornton, Roscoe Tucker, Elizabeth Ward, Henry Wilhite, Marvin Williams.

== Investigation ==
The Interstate Commerce Commission report of the accident assigned responsibility for the accident to the conductor and flagman of the local train, for failing to protect their train with fusees and torpedoes: "the action of these two experienced employees in failing to protect their train is inexcusable" (both were killed by the disaster).

A contributing factor was the failure of the express engineman to properly observe the train order signal at Shepherdsville. However the system (in which all signals were held in the stop position until an approaching train, within 600 yards of the signal sounded four short blasts to request the signal be cleared) was unworkable since, if the engineman fails to see the clearing of the signal, then he is required to stop at the signal; but high-speed trains such as the Flyer required considerably more distance than 600 yards to come to a halt.

The report also stated that the line, with 44 trains scheduled in each direction daily, could not be operated safely by the time-interval and dispatching system and recommended the railroad should "take immediate steps to implement an adequate block system for the protection of trains on this line".
