= Bullitt County Public Schools =

School district in Kentucky, United States

Bullitt County Public Schools is a school district serving students residing in Bullitt County, Kentucky. Cities served by district include Shepherdsville, Lebanon Junction, Mount Washington, and some small sections of Bullitt County with a Louisville postal address. This district is one of the largest in the state.

The district serves all of the county except for parts in Fort Knox, which are served by the Department of Defense Education Activity (DoDEA).

== Schools ==
=== Elementary schools ===
- Brooks Elementary School
- Cedar Grove Elementary School
- Crossroads Elementary School
- Freedom Elementary School
- Lebanon Junction Elementary School
- Maryville Elementary School
- Mount Washington Elementary
- Old Mill Elementary School
- Overdale Elementary School
- Pleasant Grove Elementary School
- Roby Elementary School
- Shepherdsville Elementary School

=== Middle schools ===
- Bernheim Middle School
- Bullitt Lick Middle School
- Eastside Middle School
- Hebron Middle School
- Mount Washington Middle School
- Zoneton Middle School
- Shepherdsville Middle School (Formed in 1980, closed early 1990s)

=== High schools ===
- Bullitt Central High School, located in Shepherdsville
- Bullitt East High School, located in Mount Washington
- North Bullitt High School, located in Hebron Estates (served by the Shepherdsville post office)
- Riverview Opportunity Center, located in Shepherdsville

=== Additional programs ===
- Adult Education School
- Day Treatment High School
