= Hunters Hollow, Kentucky =

- City
- Location of Hunters Hollow in Bullitt County, Kentucky.
- Coordinates: 38°04′42″N 85°41′36″W
- Country: United States
- State: Kentucky
- County: Bullitt
- Incorporated: 1979

Area
  - Total: 0.073 sq mi (0.19 km^{2})
  - Land: 0.073 sq mi (0.19 km^{2})
  - Water: 0 sq mi (0.00 km^{2})
- Elevation: 515 ft (157 m)

Population (2020)
  - Total: 324
  - Density: 4,503.1/sq mi (1,738.65/km^{2})
- Time zone: UTC-5 (Eastern (EST))
  - Summer (DST): UTC-4 (EDT)
- ZIP code: 40229
- Area code: 502
- FIPS code: 21-38670
- GNIS feature ID: 2404744
- Website: https://www.cityofhuntershollow.com/

Hunters Hollow is a home rule-class city in Bullitt County, Kentucky, in the United States. The population was 324 as of the 2020 census, down from 386 at the time of the 2010 U.S. census.

== Geography ==
Hunters Hollow is located in northern Bullitt County. The city of Hillview is to the north, east and south, and the unincorporated community of Brooks is to the west. Downtown Louisville is 15 miles (24 km) to the north.

According to the United States Census Bureau, the city has a total area of 0.1 square miles (0.26 km^{2}), all land.

== Demographics ==
Historical population
Census	Pop.	Note	%±
1980	260		—
1990	286		10.0%
2000	372		30.1%
2010	386		3.8%
2020	324		−16.1%
U.S. Decennial Census

As of the census of 2000, there were 372 people, 117 households, and 106 families residing in the city. The population density was 5,778.3 inhabitants per square mile (2,231.0/km^{2}). There were 119 housing units at an average density of 1,848.4 per square mile (713.7/km^{2}). The racial makeup of the city was 97.58% White, 0.54% Asian, 0.54% from other races, and 1.34% from two or more races. Hispanic or Latino people of any race were 0.27% of the population.

There were 117 households, out of which 52.1% had children under the age of 18 living with them, 76.1% were married couples living together, 12.0% had a female householder with no husband present, and 9.4% were non-families. 6.8% of all households were made up of individuals, and 1.7% had someone living alone who was 65 years of age or older. The average household size was 3.18 and the average family size was 3.33.

In the city the population was spread out, with 31.7% under the age of 18, 7.8% from 18 to 24, 38.4% from 25 to 44, 20.7% from 45 to 64, and 1.3% who were 65 years of age or older. The median age was 31 years. For every 100 females, there were 91.8 males. For every 100 females age 18 and over, there were 96.9 males.

The median income for a household in the city was $55,000, and the median income for a family was $55,750. Males had a median income of $38,375 versus $20,809 for females. The per capita income for the city was $17,665. About 1.8% of families and 3.0% of the population were below the poverty line, including 5.6% of those under age 18 and none of those age 65 or over.
