= Yogi Ferrell =

American basketball player (born 1993)

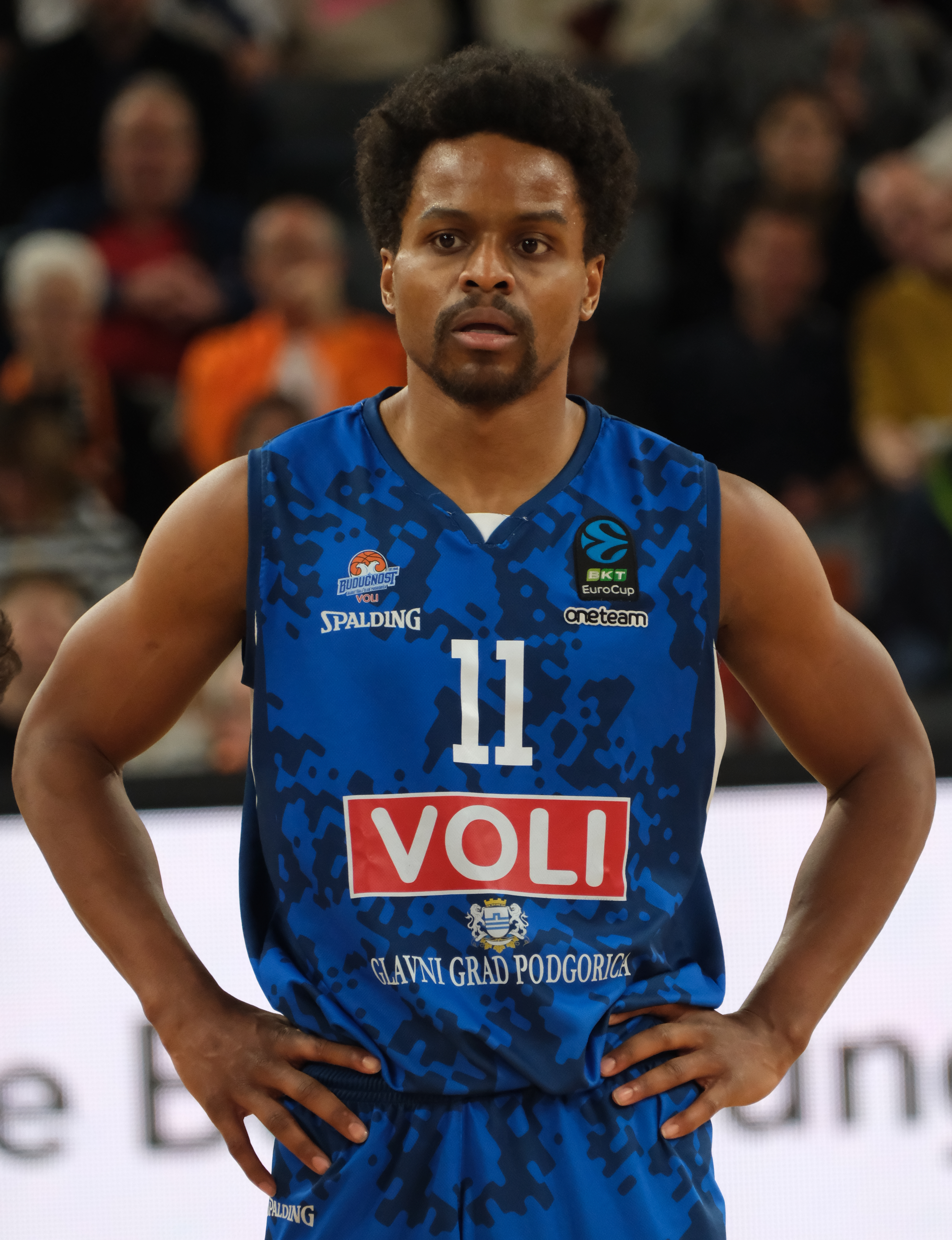
- Ferrell with Budućnost in 2025

No. 11 – Budućnost
- Position: Point guard
- League: Prva A Liga; ABA League

Personal information
- Born: May 9, 1993 (age 33) Indianapolis, Indiana, U.S.
- Listed height: 6 ft 0 in (1.83 m)
- Listed weight: 178 lb (81 kg)

Career information
- High school: Park Tudor (Indianapolis, Indiana)
- College: Indiana (2012–2016)
- NBA draft: 2016: undrafted
- Playing career: 2016–present

Career history
- 2016: Brooklyn Nets
- 2016: →Long Island Nets
- 2016–2017: Long Island Nets
- 2017–2018: Dallas Mavericks
- 2018–2020: Sacramento Kings
- 2021: Cleveland Cavaliers
- 2021: Salt Lake City Stars
- 2021: Los Angeles Clippers
- 2021: Panathinaikos
- 2021–2023: Cedevita Olimpija
- 2023: Shanghai Sharks
- 2023–present: Budućnost

Career highlights
- Montenegrin Cup winner (2025); 2× Slovenian League champion (2022, 2023); 2× Slovenian Cup winner (2022, 2023); EuroCup Top Scorer (2023); NBA D-League All-Star (2017); NBA All-Rookie Second Team (2017); Second-team All-American – SN (2016); Third-team All-American – AP, NABC (2016); 2× First-team All-Big Ten (2015, 2016); Second-team All-Big Ten (2014); Big Ten All-Defensive team (2016); Big Ten All-Freshman Team (2013); McDonald's All-American (2012)
- Stats at NBA.com
- Stats at Basketball Reference

Kevin Duane "Yogi" Ferrell Jr. (born May 9, 1993) is an American professional basketball player for Budućnost of the Montenegro Prva A Liga and the Adriatic League. He played college basketball for the Indiana Hoosiers.

== Early life ==
Ferrell played for Lakeside Elementary in Warren Township and a travel team sponsored by Adidas.

== High school career ==
At the conclusion of his high school career at Park Tudor School, Yogi Ferrell was rated the No. 19 player and No. 3 point guard in the class of 2012 by Rivals.com, the No. 32 player by Scout.com, and the No. 24 player and No. 3 point guard in the ESPNU 100. He was rated best passer, best speed, and best point guard in Indiana by Rivals, and the best player in Indiana in the November 2011 edition of Rick Bolus' High Potential rankings.

Ferrell brought Park Tudor School to the State Championship Game in just his sophomore season. They fell just short to Wheeler High School, losing 41–38 in the 2010 IHSAA Class 2A Boys Basketball State Final.

In his junior year of high school, Ferrell continued to build off his early success. He averaged 18.5 points, 6.6 assists and 3.1 rebounds per game, leading Park Tudor to a 26–2 record and the 2A IHSAA State Championship, recording 14 points, six assists and five rebounds in the championship game. The game, a 43–42 win over the Bishop Noll Institute, was played at Conseco Fieldhouse in front of 11,035 fans and a statewide television audience.

"I like to think of myself as a leader on the court. I always give it 100 percent. I try to find different guys and give them the ball where they need it. I think I’m a true point guard, and I always want my teammates to be happy. I want to lead the team to victory every night, that’s the biggest thing."

— Yogi Ferrell, ESPNHS (November 16, 2011).

In a summer game on August 8, 2011, Ferrell played in a nationally televised game at Adidas Nations in California and recorded 14 assists. On November 8, 2011, Ferrell appeared on 'Guard Play with Kenny "The Jet" Smith,' where he got a lesson from the former NBA player and TNT analyst.

In his senior year of high school, on March 24, 2012, Ferrell won a second 2A IHSAA State Championship and tied a championship game record with 12 assists. He also contributed 17 points and nine rebounds, coming up just one rebound short of a triple-double. Ferrell finished his senior year averaging 18.5 points, 3.1 rebounds and 6.6 assists per game, as the team went 26–2 during the season. Ferrell was Indiana Mr. Basketball runner-up behind Gary Harris.

== College career ==
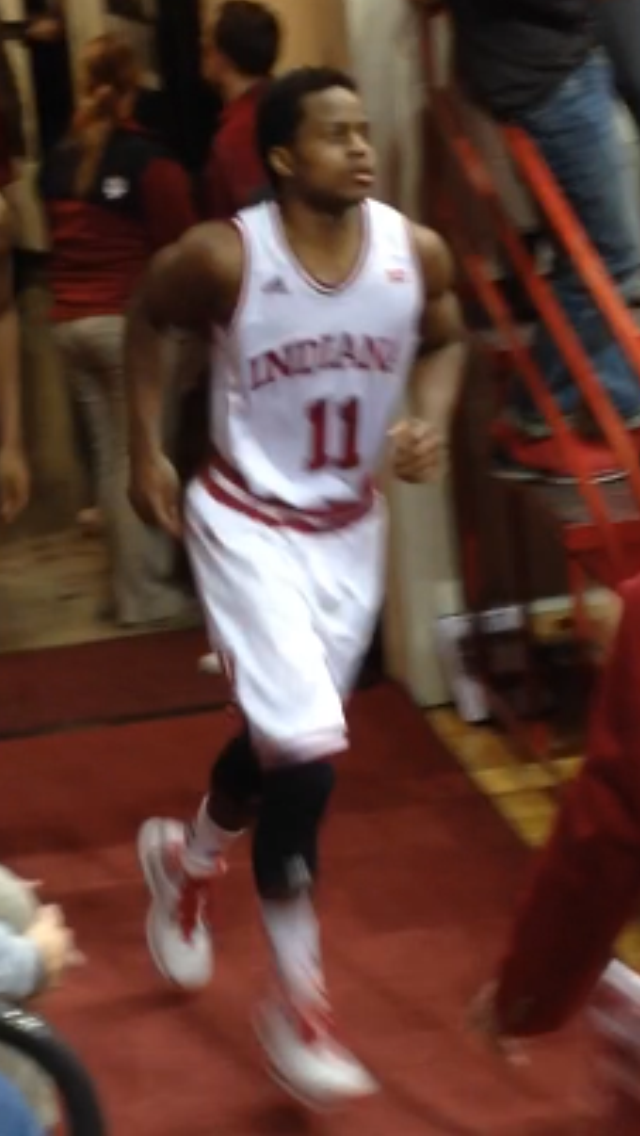
Ferrell with the Indiana Hoosiers in 2014

On November 9, 2011, Ferrell signed a letter of intent to play for Indiana, turning down offers from Butler, Florida, Virginia, and Wake Forest. Upon committing to Indiana said, "The main goal I actually want to accomplish coming in to college is winning a national championship." Ferrell was one of five players included in an Indiana recruiting class ranked by Rivals.com as second in the nation for 2012.

In his freshman year during the 2012–13 season, Ferrell was described as running the offense "with the focus of a surgeon" while playing tenacious defense. According to Indiana head coach Tom Crean, "He's wiser than his years. He's at his best in big environments." His team finished the regular season as outright Big Ten champions. Ferrell finished the season averaging 7.6 points, 4.1 assists, and 2.8 rebounds in 28.1 minutes per game. He also shot 40.3% from the field and 79.8% from the free throw line. His 132 single-season assists by a freshman ranked among the top two in the Indiana record book.

Ferrell continued to excel in his sophomore year, leading the team in scoring (17.3 ppg) and assists (3.9 apg). He had another strong shooting year, hitting 41.3% from the field and 40% from beyond the arc. At the end of the season, Ferrell was named to the All-Big Ten Second Team by the coaches and media.

During his junior season, Ferrell continued to move up in the record books. His active streak of making at least one three-pointer in a game extended to 65 straight games, which stands as the longest active streak in the nation. He joined the 1,000 points scorers' club early in the season, and he finished with 1,379 points (22nd on the all-time leading scorers list at UW P). Ferrell made an impressive jump on the all-time leading assists list with his total at the end of the season coming to 438 (sixth on the all-time assist list at IU). He also joined the elite club at IU in which only five Hoosiers have 1,000 career points, 400 career assists, and 300 career rebounds. Ferrell was also the first player to lead the team in points and assists in back-to-back seasons since Isiah Thomas did it in 1981.

In his senior year, Ferrell continued his record-breaking legacy. On January 19, 2016, he broke the all-time assists record at Indiana University when he made his 546th career assist while facing off against Illinois' Fighting Illini. On February 1, he was named one of 10 finalists for the Bob Cousy Point Guard of the Year Award. He was named to the 35-man midseason watchlist for the Naismith Trophy on February 11.

On June 22, 2020, the Big Ten Network named Ferrell to their "All-Decade Basketball Team", placing him on their Third Team. Ferrell was one of 16 players honored by the Network for accomplishments between 2010 and 2019. Of the honor, Ferrell told BTN's Rick Pizzo, "Man, that's a huge honor. I didn't even know they were voting for that. To be a part of that is really something great."

Ferrell would also set the Indiana record for career starts by Senior night.

== Professional career ==
=== Long Island Nets (2016) ===
After going undrafted in the 2016 NBA draft, Ferrell joined the Brooklyn Nets for the 2016 NBA Summer League. In four games for the Nets, he averaged 8.8 points, 1.8 assists, 1.5 rebounds in 17 minutes per game. He shot 43.8 percent from the field, 18.2 percent on three-pointers, and 71.4 percent from the free throw line. He signed with the Nets on August 5, 2016, but was later waived on October 21, after appearing in three preseason games.

On November 1, 2016, Ferrell was acquired by the Long Island Nets of the NBA Development League as an affiliate player of Brooklyn.

=== Brooklyn Nets (2016) ===
Ferrell returned to Brooklyn on November 9, 2016, and made his NBA debut that night, recording five points, three assists, one rebound and one steal in 14 minutes off the bench in a 110–96 loss to the New York Knicks. On November 30, he was assigned to Long Island. He was recalled on December 1, reassigned on December 5, and recalled again later that day. On December 8, he was waived by Brooklyn after appearing in 10 games.

=== Return to Long Island (2016–2017) ===
On December 10, 2016, Ferrell was reacquired by the Long Island Nets.

=== Dallas Mavericks (2017–2018) ===
On January 28, 2017, Ferrell signed a 10-day contract with the Dallas Mavericks. He made his debut for the Mavericks the following day, recording nine points and seven assists in 36 minutes as a starter in a 105–101 win over the San Antonio Spurs. A day later, he scored a then career-high 19 points in a 104–97 win over the Cleveland Cavaliers. On February 1, in a 113–95 win over the Philadelphia 76ers, Ferrell had 11 points and five assists in 38 minutes in just his third game with the team. Two days later, he scored a career-high 32 points in a 108–104 win over the Portland Trail Blazers. He became just the third undrafted rookie in NBA history to have a 30-point game within his first 15 games, joining Connie Hawkins (twice) and Anthony Morrow. Ferrell, a 28 percent 3-point shooter coming into the game against Portland, hit nine three-pointers on 11 attempts, which tied the record for made three-point shots in a game for an NBA rookie. On February 7, 2017, he signed a multiyear deal with the Mavericks. Deron Williams' return from injury on February 11 against the Orlando Magic meant Ferrell didn't start at point guard for the first time in eight games since joining the Mavericks. Despite coming off the bench, he was solid again with 10 points and seven of Dallas' season-high 32 assists in a 112–80 win. On March 2, 2017, he was named Western Conference Rookie of the Month for games played in February. He led all Western Conference rookies in scoring (12.0 ppg), assists (4.7 apg) and minutes (31.5 mpg) in February. At the season's end, he was named to the NBA All-Rookie Second Team.

On December 22, 2017, Ferrell scored a then season-high 23 points in a 113–101 loss to the Miami Heat. On January 10, 2018, he made seven 3-pointers and scored 22 points in a 115–111 win over the Charlotte Hornets. On March 6, 2018, he scored a season-high 24 points with six 3-pointers in a 118–107 win over the Denver Nuggets.

On June 26, 2018, Ferrell received a qualifying offer from the Mavericks. They later withdrew the offer on July 13. After reportedly agreeing to terms on a two-year, $5.3 million deal on July 19, Ferrell backed out of his agreement with the Mavericks the following day.

=== Sacramento Kings (2018–2020) ===
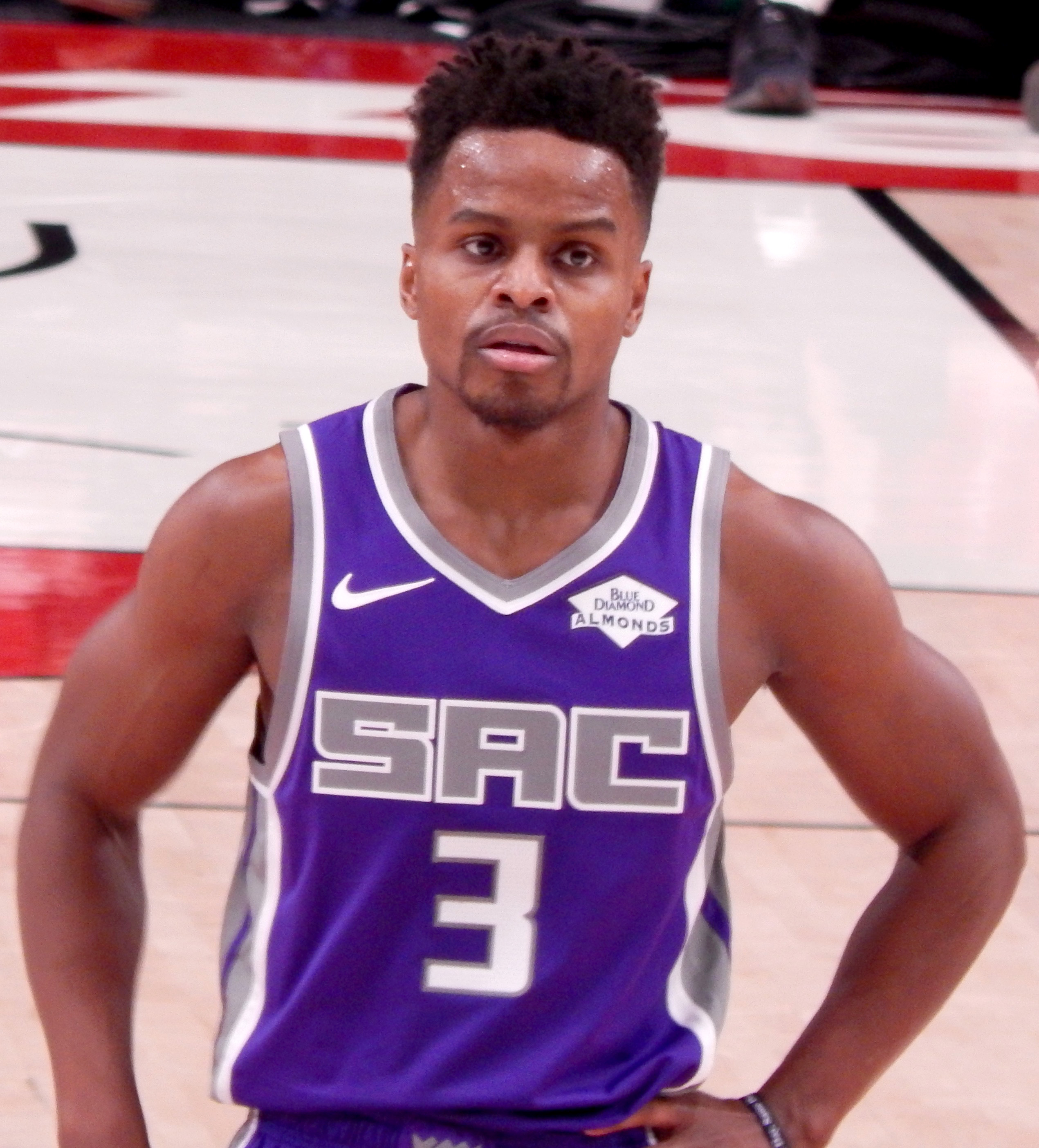
Ferrell with the Sacramento Kings in 2019

On July 23, 2018, Ferrell signed a two-year deal with the Sacramento Kings on a contract worth $3,000,000 for the 2018–19 season and $3,150,000 in the 2019–20 season.

=== Cleveland Cavaliers (2021) ===
On December 18, 2020, Ferrell signed a contract with the Utah Jazz, but was later waived on the next day. On January 11, 2021, he signed a 10-day contract with the Cleveland Cavaliers, but was waived three days later, after playing two games on successive nights. He scored 9 points against Memphis on 4–9 shooting and 10 points against Utah on 4–12 shooting.

=== Salt Lake City Stars (2021) ===
On January 26, 2021, Ferrell signed with the Salt Lake City Stars, appearing in 14 games.

=== Los Angeles Clippers (2021) ===
On April 19, 2021, Ferrell signed a 10-day contract with the Los Angeles Clippers and ten days later, he signed a multi-year contract.

=== Panathinaikos (2021) ===
On October 10, 2021, Ferrell signed with European powerhouse Panathinaikos of the Greek Basket League and the EuroLeague until the end of the 2021–22 season.

=== Cedevita Olimpija (2021–2023) ===
On December 1, 2021, Ferrell signed with Slovenian club Cedevita Olimpija of the ABA League.

Yogi Ferrell won the Slovenian Basketball League Finals MVP in 2023, scoring 35 points in game 3.

=== Shanghai Sharks (2023) ===
On August 17, 2023, Ferrell signed with the Shanghai Sharks of the Chinese Basketball Association.

=== Budućnost VOLI (2023–present) ===
On November 29, 2023, Ferrell signed a one-year deal with Budućnost VOLI of the Montenegrin Prva A Liga and the Adriatic League.

On June 14, 2026, Ferrell re–signed with Budućnost.

== Career statistics ==
Legend
GP	Games played	GS	Games started	MPG	Minutes per game
FG%	Field goal percentage	3P%	3-point field goal percentage	FT%	Free throw percentage
RPG	Rebounds per game	APG	Assists per game	SPG	Steals per game
BPG	Blocks per game	PPG	Points per game	**Bold**	Career high
*	Led the league

=== NBA ===
==== Regular season ====
Year	Team	GP	GS	MPG	FG%	3P%	FT%	RPG	APG	SPG	BPG	PPG
2016–17	Brooklyn	10	0	15.1	.367	.296	.625	1.2	1.7	.2	.2	5.4
2016–17	Dallas	36	**29**	**29.1**	.412	**.403**	.877	2.8	**4.3**	1.1	.2	**11.3**
2017–18	Dallas	**82***	21	27.8	.426	.373	.796	3.0	2.5	.8	.1	10.2
2018–19	Sacramento	71	3	15.0	**.435**	.362	.896	1.5	1.9	.5	.1	5.9
2019–20	Sacramento	50	0	10.6	.420	.304	.857	1.0	1.4	.4	.1	4.4
2020–21	Cleveland	2	0	20.0	.381	.333	.000	**3.5**	2.5	**1.5**	**.5**	9.5
2020–21	L.A. Clippers	8	0	12.0	.333	.316	**1.000**	1.5	2.1	.5	.3	4.6
Career		259	53	20.1	.420	.365	.835	2.1	2.3	.6	.1	7.7

==== Playoffs ====
Year	Team	GP	GS	MPG	FG%	3P%	FT%	RPG	APG	SPG	BPG	PPG
2021	L.A. Clippers	9	0	1.7	.400	.000	—	.3	.3	.0	.0	.4
Career		9	0	1.7	.400	.000	—	.3	.3	.0	.0	.4

=== EuroLeague ===
Year	Team	GP	GS	MPG	FG%	3P%	FT%	RPG	APG	SPG	BPG	PPG	PIR
2021–22	Panathinaikos	5	0	8.0	.214	.250	—	1.0	1.8	—	—	1.6	0.8
Career		5	0	8.0	.214	.250	—	1.0	1.8	—	—	1.6	0.8

=== College ===
Year	Team	GP	GS	MPG	FG%	3P%	FT%	RPG	APG	SPG	BPG	PPG
2012–13	Indiana	**36**	**36**	28.1	.403	.303	.798	2.8	4.1	.8	**.2**	7.6
2013–14	Indiana	32	32	33.8	.413	.400	.824	3.0	3.9	.8	.0	**17.3**
2014–15	Indiana	34	34	**34.9**	.439	.416	**.860**	3.2	4.9	.7	.0	16.3
2015–16	Indiana	35	35	34.7	**.458**	**.420**	.829	**3.8**	**5.6**	**1.1**	.0	**17.3**
Career		137	137	32.8	.432	.399	.830	3.2	4.6	.8	.1	14.5

== Personal life ==
Ferrell is the son of Kevin Ferrell Sr. and Lydia Ferrell and has one brother and two sisters.
