= Logan Wyatt =

American baseball player (born 1997)

Free agent
- First baseman
- Born: November 15, 1997 (age 28); Louisville, Kentucky, U.S.
- Bats: Left Throws: Right

Logan Thomas Wyatt (born November 15, 1997) is an American professional baseball first baseman who is a free agent. He played college baseball for the Louisville Cardinals and was selected by the San Francisco Giants in the second round of the 2019 Major League Baseball draft.

== Amateur career ==
Wyatt attended North Bullitt High School in Shepherdsville, Kentucky. He signed to play college baseball at the University of Louisville during his senior year. As a senior, he batted .412 with five home runs, 55 RBIs, and seven stolen bases and was named to the All-State baseball team for the third time in his high school career. Undrafted out of high school in the 2016 Major League Baseball draft, he enrolled at Louisville to play college baseball for the Louisville Cardinals.

In 2017, as a freshman at Louisville, Wyatt appeared in only 18 games, batting .167. That summer, he played in the New England Collegiate Baseball League with the Sanford Mainers where he hit .258 in 22 games. Wyatt broke out as a sophomore in 2018. In 64 games, he slashed .339/.490/.522 with six home runs and 69 RBIs and was named to the All-ACC First Team. After the season, he played in the Cape Cod Baseball League for the Orleans Firebirds and was named to the All League Team. In 2019, Wyatt's junior year, he batted .283 with nine home runs and 53 RBIs in 69 games and was named to the All-ACC Second Team.

== Professional career ==
=== San Francisco Giants ===
Wyatt was considered one of the top prospects for the 2019 Major League Baseball draft. He was selected by the San Francisco Giants in the second round with the 51st overall pick, and signed for $1 million. He made his professional debut with the Arizona League Giants of the Rookie-level Arizona League, and, after seven games, was promoted to the Salem-Keizer Volcanoes of the Low–A Northwoods League. After 18 games with Salem-Keizer, he earned a promotion to the Augusta GreenJackets of the Single–A South Atlantic League. Over 44 games between the three clubs, he batted .278 with three home runs and 30 RBI.

Wyatt did not play in a game in 2020 due to the cancellation of the minor league season because of the COVID-19 pandemic. In 2021, he was assigned to the Eugene Emeralds of the High-A West and also played briefly for the Rookie-level Arizona Complex League Giants, slashing .238/.386/.308 with two home runs and 28 RBI over eighty games with both teams. After playing only 29 games in 2022, he was selected to play in the Arizona Fall League for the Scottsdale Scorpions following the end of the season. In 2023, Wyatt split the season between Eugene and the Double–A Richmond Flying Squirrels, slashing .258/.355/.436 with 17 home runs and 65 RBI over 117 games.

Wyatt began the 2024 campaign back with Richmond, playing in 14 games and hitting .156/.240/.333 with two home runs, five RBI, and one stolen base.

=== Lake Country DockHounds ===
Wyatt initially retired from professional baseball on August 10, 2024. However, on October 13, 2025, Wyatt came out of retirement and signed with the Lake Country DockHounds of the American Association of Professional Baseball. He was released by Lake Country prior to the start of the season on February 4, 2026.
