= Rick Bolus High Potential "Blue-Chip" Basketball Camp =

Coordinates: 38.208°N 84.553°W

Rick Bolus High Potential Blue Chip Basketball Camp
- Type: Private
- Industry: Camp, Sports Camp
- Founded: 1980
- Headquarters: Shepherdsville, Kentucky
- Key people: Rick Bolus, Founder of High Potential Blue Chip, Scout
- Website: http://www.basketball-camp.net

Rick Bolus High Potential "Blue-Chip" Basketball Camp is a youth basketball camp organization that holds camps annually during the summer months. The camp was created by basketball scout Rick Bolus who is based out of Kentucky.

== History ==
The "Blue-Chip" Basketball Camp began in 1980 for the purpose of providing exposure and evaluation for middle and high school level basketball players during the summer offseason. Bolus has served as a basketball scout since 1973 when he started the High Potential recruiting service. The camp was created particularly to help provide awareness for talented "sleepers" that could otherwise go unnoticed by college recruiters and coaches. "Blue-Chip" camps have been held primarily at colleges and universities in the state of Kentucky which include Northern Kentucky University, Bellarmine University, Campbellsville University, and Georgetown College.

"Blue-Chip" camps have been featured in USA Today and the Louisville Courier-Journal.
