= Brownington =

Brownington may refer to:

- Brownington, Kentucky
- Brownington, Vermont
- Brownington, Missouri
