= Solitude, Kentucky =

Unincorporated community in Kentucky, United States

Solitude
- Unincorporated community
- Location within the state of Kentucky Solitude (the United States)
- Coordinates: 37°58′23″N 85°32′25″W
- Country: United States
- State: Kentucky
- County: Bullitt
- Elevation: 469 ft (143 m)
- Time zone: UTC-5 (Eastern (EST))
  - Summer (DST): UTC-4 (EST)
- GNIS feature ID: 509090

Solitude is an unincorporated community located in Bullitt County, Kentucky, United States.
