= Shepherdsville, Kentucky =

- City
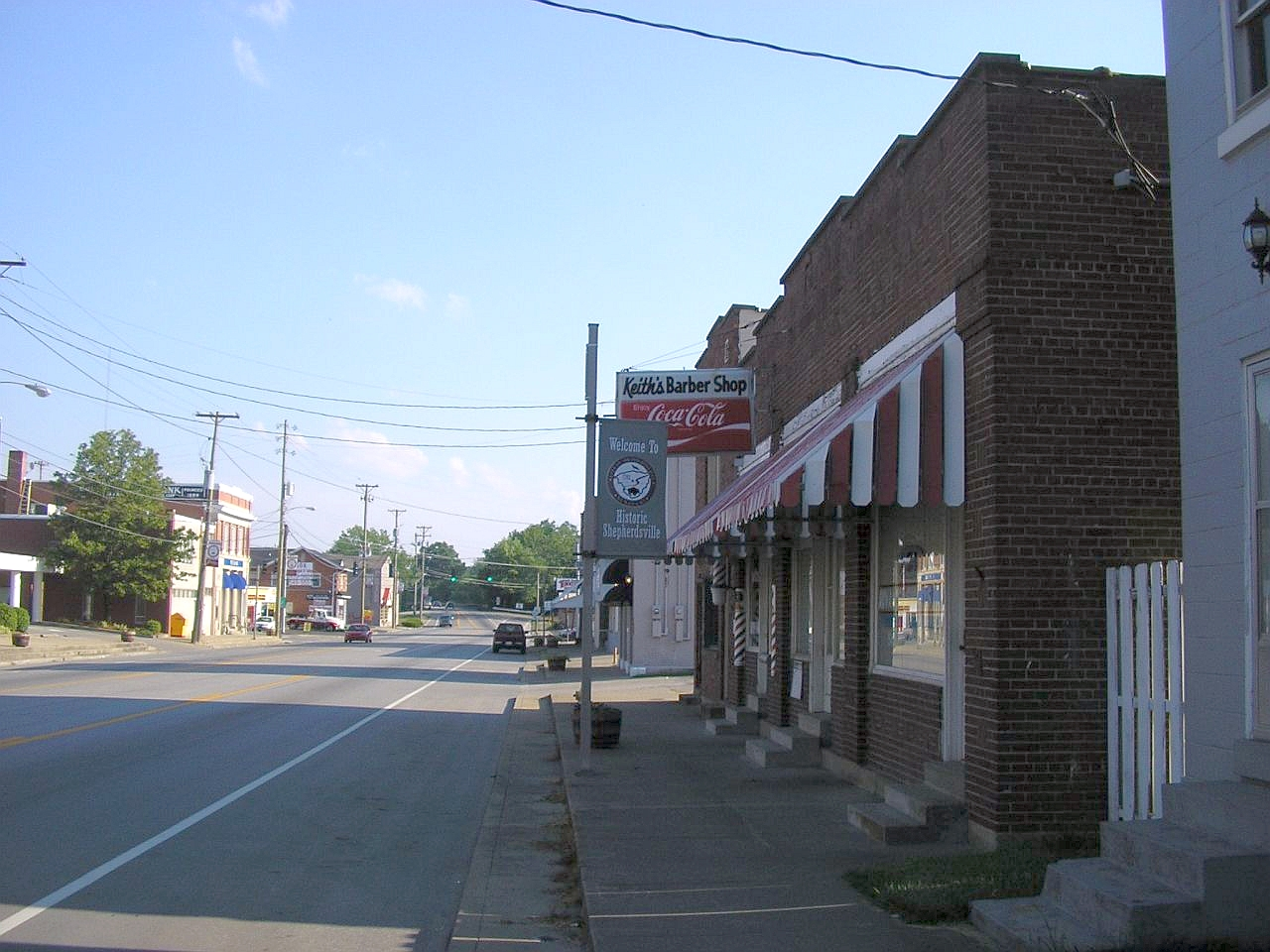
- Downtown Shepherdsville

- Flag Seal

- Location of Bullitt County Kentucky Incorporated and Unincorporated areas Shepherdsville Highlighted 2170086.svg
- Coordinates: 37.981425°N 85.702007°W
- Country: United States
- State: Kentucky
- County: Bullitt
- Founded: December 11, 1793

Government
  - Mayor: Jose Cubero
  - Councilmembers: Mike Hibbard Sr. Jennifer Mendez; Rob Adams; Bonnie Enlow; Faith Portman; Brad Whittaker

Area
  - Total: 16.613 sq mi (43.027 km^{2})
  - Land: 16.322 sq mi (42.273 km^{2})
  - Water: 0.291 sq mi (0.753 km^{2}) 1.75%
- Elevation: 430 ft (130 m)

Population (2020)
  - Total: 14,201
  - Estimate (2024): 14,837
  - Density: 909.1/sq mi (351.01/km^{2})
- Demonym: Shepherdsvillean
- Time zone: UTC−5 (Eastern (EST))
  - Summer (DST): UTC−4 (EDT)
- ZIP Code: 40165
- Area code: 502
- FIPS code: 21-70086
- GNIS feature ID: 2405458
- Website: shepherdsvilleky.gov

Shepherdsville is a home rule-class city on the Salt River in Bullitt County, Kentucky, United States. It is the second-largest city and seat of its county, located just south of Louisville. The population was 14,201 at the 2020 census, and was estimated to be 14,837 in 2024.

== History ==
Native Americans have been shown to have lived in the area for at least 15,000 years.

The vicinity was originally known by European Americans as "Bullitt's Lick" for the salt licks discovered by surveyor Capt. Thomas Bullitt in 1773. The area was home to Kentucky's first commercial salt works. These were shuttered in the 1830s because of competition from Virginian works along the Kanawha River (now in West Virginia). Shepherdsville developed around the mill and store erected along the Salt River by Adam Shepherd, who had purchased 900 acres (360 ha) in the area. The city received its charter in 1793 and was designated as the county seat when Bullitt County was formed in 1796.

The first post office opened in 1806. In 1836, a mineral water spa called Paroquet Springs opened. The mineral water was believed to have medicinal properties, so people with a variety of maladies visited Shepherdsville to drink and bathe in the water. In the mid-1850s, the Louisville and Nashville Railroad's mainline was constructed nearby.

During the Civil War, the railroad bridge over the Salt River at Shepherdsville was a potential target for sabotage and was guarded by Union troops. In 1879 shortly after the formal end of Reconstruction, the Paroquet Springs hotel burned to the ground. Water from the springs continued to be bottled and sold until 1915.

The Lynching of Marie Thompson of Shepherdsville was conducted in 1904, close to the jail near Lebanon Junction.

About 50 people were killed in the Shepherdsville train wreck in late December 1917, a two-train collision that was the deadliest train wreck in Kentucky history.

Throughout most of the 20th century, Shepherdsville's economy was based on agriculture. It was a trading center for the county, and important for law and justice related to the county seat. Construction of the Kentucky Turnpike (now Interstate 65) in the 1950s stimulated residential development in the suburbs, as people who worked in Louisville could commute more easily to work. Many moved to Shepherdsville and other outlying areas to have new houses.

== Geography ==
Shepherdsville is located on the banks of the Salt River. Downtown Louisville is 20 miles (32 km) to the north via Interstate 65, and Elizabethtown is 26 miles (42 km) to the south.

According to the United States Census Bureau, the city has a total area of 16.613 square miles (43.03 km^{2}), of which 16.322 square miles (42.27 km^{2}) is land and 0.291 square miles (0.75 km^{2}) (1.75%) is water.

=== Climate ===
The climate in this area is characterized by hot, humid summers and generally mild to cool winters. According to the Köppen Climate Classification system, Shepherdsville has a humid subtropical climate, abbreviated "Cfa" on climate maps.

== Demographics ==
Historical population
Census	Pop.	Note	%±
1800	96		—
1830	278		—
1860	305		—
1870	267		−12.5%
1880	299		12.0%
1890	251		−16.1%
1900	277		10.4%
1910	318		14.8%
1920	626		96.9%
1930	633		1.1%
1940	762		20.4%
1950	943		23.8%
1960	1,525		61.7%
1970	2,769		81.6%
1980	4,454		60.9%
1990	4,805		7.9%
2000	8,334		73.4%
2010	11,222		34.7%
2020	14,201		26.5%
2024 (est.)	14,837		4.5%
U.S. Decennial Census; 2020 Census

=== Racial and ethnic composition ===
Shepherdsville, Kentucky – racial and ethnic composition Note: the US Census treats Hispanic/Latino as an ethnic category. This table excludes Latinos from the racial categories and assigns them to a separate category. Hispanics/Latinos may be of any race.
Race / ethnicity (NH = non-Hispanic)	Pop. 1990	Pop. 2000	Pop. 2010	Pop. 2020	% 1990	% 2000	% 2010	% 2020
White alone (NH)	4,700	8,061	10,656	12,606	97.81%	96.72%	94.96%	88.77%
Black or African American alone (NH)	65	77	110	315	1.35%	0.92%	0.98%	2.22%
Native American or Alaska Native alone (NH)	2	27	41	34	0.04%	0.32%	0.37%	0.24%
Asian alone (NH)	17	31	62	107	0.35%	0.37%	0.55%	0.75%
Pacific Islander alone (NH)	—	1	2	4	—	0.01%	0.02%	0.03%
Other race alone (NH)	0	3	4	22	0.00%	0.04%	0.04%	0.15%
Mixed race or multiracial (NH)	—	72	168	711	—	0.86%	1.50%	5.01%
Hispanic or Latino (any race)	21	62	179	402	0.44%	0.74%	1.60%	2.83%
Total	4,805	8,334	11,222	14,201	100.00%	100.00%	100.00%	100.00%

=== 2020 census ===
As of the 2020 census, Shepherdsville had a population of 14,201, with 5,462 households and 3,791 families.

The median age was 33.7 years. 26.9% of residents were under the age of 18 and 10.5% of residents were 65 years of age or older. For every 100 females there were 94.4 males, and for every 100 females age 18 and over there were 91.4 males age 18 and over.

96.9% of residents lived in urban areas, while 3.1% lived in rural areas.

There were 5,679 housing units, of which 3.8% were vacant. The homeowner vacancy rate was 1.0% and the rental vacancy rate was 5.6%.

=== Recent estimates ===
As of the 2023 American Community Survey, there are 5,476 estimated households in Shepherdsville with an average of 2.59 persons per household. The city has a median household income of $71,250. Approximately 20.6% of the city's population lives at or below the poverty line. Shepherdsville has an estimated 69.4% employment rate, with 17.2% of the population holding a bachelor's degree or higher and 88.0% holding a high school diploma.

=== 2010 census ===
As of the 2010 census, there were 11,222 people, 4,199 households, and _ families residing in the city. The population density was 0.0 inhabitants per square mile (0.0/km^{2}). There were 4,483 housing units at an average density of 0.0 per square mile (0.0/km^{2}). The racial makeup of the city was 95.83% White, 0.99% African American, 0.37% Native American, 0.55% Asian, 0.03% Pacific Islander, 0.60% from some other races and 1.64% from two or more races. Hispanic or Latino people of any race were 1.60% of the population.

=== 2000 census ===
As of the 2000 census, there were 8,334 people, 3,177 households, and 2,363 families residing in the city. The population density was 791.30 inhabitants per square mile (305.5/km^{2}). There were 3,402 housing units at an average density of 323.00 per square mile (124.7/km^{2}). The racial makeup of the city was 97.24% White, 0.92% African American, 0.35% Native American, 0.37% Asian, 0.02% Pacific Islander, 0.12% from some other races and 0.97% from two or more races. Hispanic or Latino people of any race were 0.74% of the population.

There were 3,177 households, out of which 41.6% had children under the age of 18 living with them, 52.0% were married couples living together, 17.3% had a female householder with no husband present, and 25.6% were non-families. 20.7% of all households were made up of individuals, and 7.1% had someone living alone who was 65 years of age or older. The average household size was 2.59 and the average family size was 2.96.

In the city, the population was spread out, with 28.9% under the age of 18, 12.2% from 18 to 24, 33.4% from 25 to 44, 17.4% from 45 to 64, and 8.1% who were 65 years of age or older. The median age was 29 years. For every 100 females, there were 94.9 males. For every 100 females age 18 and over, there were 90.8 males.

The median income for a household in the city was $36,103, and the median income for a family was $40,878. Males had a median income of $31,324 versus $22,871 for females. The per capita income for the city was $16,519. About 13.7% of families and 15.2% of the population were below the poverty line, including 25.2% of those under age 18 and 8.6% of those age 65 or over.

== Economy ==
In 2024, Shepherdsville began a $40 million revitalizing plan that includes transforming a downtown area into a new town square, revitalizing parks and streetscapes, and erecting a $25 million aquatic center that is intended to be a tourist destination.

== Arts and culture ==
Shepherdsville has a public library, a branch of the Bullitt County Public Library.

== Education ==
Area students attend Bullitt County Public Schools. Different sections of the city are zoned to one of the county's three regular public high schools:

- Most of the city is served by Bullitt Central High School, located in Shepherdsville proper.

- Bernheim Middle and Bullitt Lick Middle are the middle schools for this area.
- Cedar Grove Elementary, Lebanon Junction Elementary, Nichols Elementary, Roby Elementary and Shepherdsville Elementary are the primary schools for this area.

- Some northern areas are zoned to North Bullitt High School, which has a Shepherdsville postal address but is located in the city of Hebron Estates.

- Hebron Middle and Zoneton Middle are the middle schools for this area.
- Brooks Elementary, Freedom Elementary, Maryville Elementary and Overdale Elementary are the primary schools for this area.

- Far eastern portions of the city are zoned to Bullitt East High School in Mount Washington.

- Eastside Middle and Mt. Washington Middle are the middle schools for this area.
- Crossroads Elementary, Mt. Washington Elementary, Old Mill Elementary and Pleasant Grove Elementary are the primary schools for this area.

The city also houses Riverview High School, the county district's alternative high school for at-risk students.

== Notable people ==
- Rick Bolus, high school basketball scout and analyst
- Cameron Dukes, gridiron football player, Toronto Argonauts
- Wayne Edwards, NASCAR driver
- Charles Kurtsinger, horse jockey, U.S. Racing Hall of Famer
- Alexandria Mills, model and Miss World 2010
- Shannon Tindle, creator of Kubo and the Two Strings

Notable animal

- GTR Patricks Vindicator, miniature horse ambassador, animal celebrity
