= North Bullitt High School =

Location
- 3200 E. Hebron Lane; Shepherdsville, Kentucky 40165; United States; 38.049°N 85.671°W

Information
- Type: Public
- Established: 1975
- School district: Bullitt County Public Schools
- Principal: Kristi Lynch
- Teaching staff: 63.93 (on an FTE basis)
- Grades: 9-12
- Enrollment: 1,178 (2024-2025)
  - Grade 9: 296
  - Grade 10: 290
  - Grade 11: 301
  - Grade 12: 289
- Student to teacher ratio: 18.43
- Campus type: Suburban
- Colors: Green and gold
- Nickname: Eagles
- Website: North Bullitt High School webpage

North Bullitt High School is a school located in Hebron Estates, Kentucky, United States, a small city served by the post office of nearby Shepherdsville. Opened in 1975, it is part of the Bullitt County Public Schools district. There are currently over 1,100 students enrolled at NBHS. The principal is Kristi Lynch.

The school underwent renovations in 2005 which were fully completed by Fall 2008. Another expansion for a career readiness center with fifteen additional classrooms was finished in 2014.

== Athletic activities ==
- Archery
- Baseball (boys')
- Basketball (boys')
- Basketball (girls')
- USAJROTC - color guard and rifle drill team
- Bowling
- Cheerleading
- Cross country
- Dance team
- Football
- Golf
- Marching band
- Soccer (boys')
- Soccer (girls')
- Softball
- Swimming
- Tennis (boys')]
- Tennis (girls')]
- Track (boys')
- Track (girls')
- Volleyball
- Wrestling

== Notable alumni ==
- Tom Mabe (class of 1985), comedian and performer
- Logan Wyatt (class of 2016), professional baseball first baseman
