= Bullitt County, Kentucky =

County in Kentucky, United States

- County
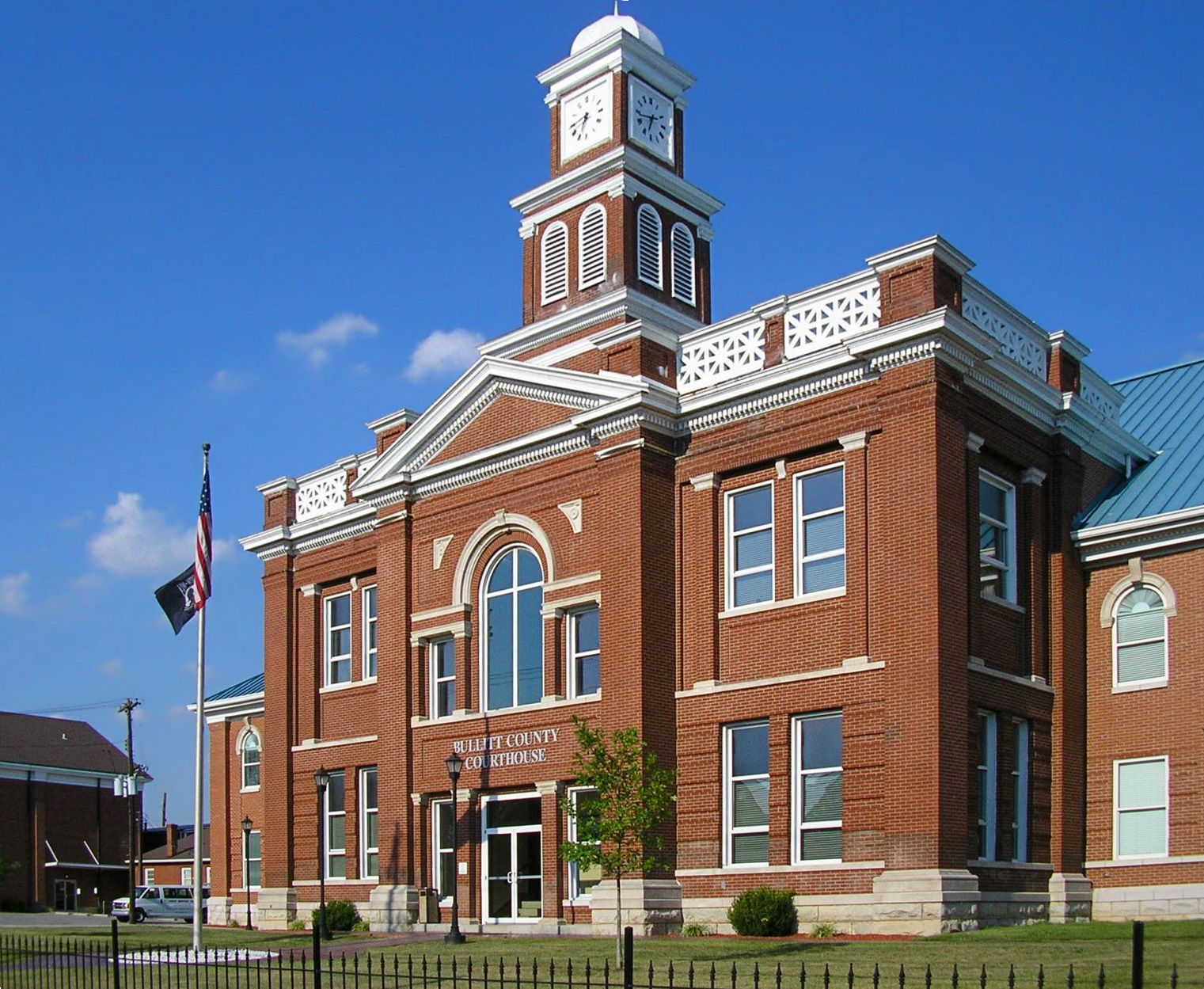
- Bullitt County Courthouse in Shepherdsville

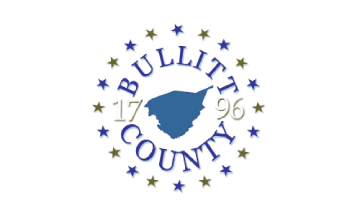
- Flag Seal

- Location within the U.S. state of Kentucky
- Coordinates: 37°58′N 85°42′W
- Country: United States
- State: Kentucky
- Founded: 1792
- Named for: Alexander Scott Bullitt
- Seat: Shepherdsville
- Largest city: Mount Washington

Government
  - Judge/Executive: Jerry Summers (R)

Area
  - Total: 300 sq mi (780 km^{2})
  - Land: 297 sq mi (770 km^{2})
  - Water: 3.2 sq mi (8.3 km^{2}) 1.1%

Population (2020)
  - Total: 82,217
  - Estimate (2025): 86,454 ▲
  - Density: 277/sq mi (107/km^{2})
- Time zone: UTC−5 (Eastern)
  - Summer (DST): UTC−4 (EDT)
- Congressional district: 2nd
- Website: bullittky.com

Bullitt County is a county located in the north central portion of the U.S. state of Kentucky. As of the 2020 census, the population was 82,217. Its county seat is Shepherdsville. The county was founded in 1796. Located just south of the city of Louisville, Bullitt County is included in the Louisville/Jefferson County, KY-IN Metropolitan Statistical Area, commonly known as Kentuckiana. The western fifth of the county (62 sq. miles/40,000 acres (160 km^{2})) is part of the United States Army post of Fort Knox and is reserved for military training.

== History ==
The first inhabitants of the land that would become Bullitt County were the Paleo-Indians who entered North America approximately 11,500 to 10,000 years BP. These people, whose ancestors can be traced back to Eastern and Central Asia, were nomadic. They were hunters and gatherers whose remains have been discovered near the area's mineral springs or salt licks, where big game such as the mammoth, bison and ground sloth once gathered. Native Americans were their descendants, including the Shawnee people, who probably considered this region part of their homeland and certainly valued it as a hunting ground.

Both France and Britain had traders and colonists who encountered the Shawnee. European colonization of the Americas led to competing claims between those nations to the lands west of the Appalachians and east of the Mississippi River. After suffering defeat by Great Britain in the Seven Years' War (known as the French and Indian War in its North American front), France ceded control in 1763 of its claimed territories.

For thousands of years before the county's formation, nutrient-rich salt licks attracted large herds of bison and other game to the area. Native American tribes made it their hunting grounds, as did the 18th century longhunter. In 1773, after the French and Indian War, the Virginia governor sent Captain Thomas Bullitt (uncle to Alexander Scott Bullitt) into the area to survey for land grants. The most historic of the county's salt licks, Bullitt's Lick, is named after him. As the Revolutionary War led to widespread salt shortages, the Lick became the site of Kentucky's first industry, attracting many settlers to the area.

Colonial veterans of the war were promised land in what was later called Kentucky. Bullitt's Lick became an important saltwork to the region; its salt was harvested and sent by pack train and flatboat as far off as Illinois to the west. The Bullitt's Lick saltwork was Kentucky's first industry and in production until around 1830. By that time, the steamboat and importing of salt brought access to less expensive sources.

The first settlement of the area was also the first station on the Wilderness Road between Harrodsburg and the Falls of the Ohio. It was a fort called Brashear's Station or the Salt River Garrison, built in 1779 at the mouth of Floyd's Fork. Most of the county was settled after the American Revolutionary War. Shepherdsville, named after Adam Shepherd, a prosperous business man who purchased the land near the Falls of Salt River in 1793, is the oldest town and became the county seat.

In December 1796 the county of Bullitt, named after Thomas Bullitt's nephew and Kentucky's first Lieutenant Governor Alexander Scott Bullitt, was organized from land taken from Jefferson and Nelson counties through an act approved on December 13, 1796, by the Kentucky General Assembly. In 1811, the northwestern area of the county expanded to include land given by Jefferson County. In 1824, an eastern area of the county was given to help form Spencer County.

BE it enacted by the General Assembly, That from and after the first day of January next, all that part of the counties of Jefferson and Nelson included in the following bounds.. shall be one distinct county and called and known by the name of Bullitt.

— Kentucky General Assembly, December 13, 1796

== Geography ==
According to the United States Census Bureau, the county has a total area of 300 square miles (780 km^{2}), of which 297 square miles (770 km^{2}) is land and 3.2 square miles (8.3 km^{2}) (1.1%) is water. The county is located in the far western Bluegrass region known as the Knobs.

=== Adjacent counties ===
- Jefferson County – (north)
- Spencer County – (east)
- Nelson County – (southeast)
- Hardin County – (southwest)

== Demographics ==
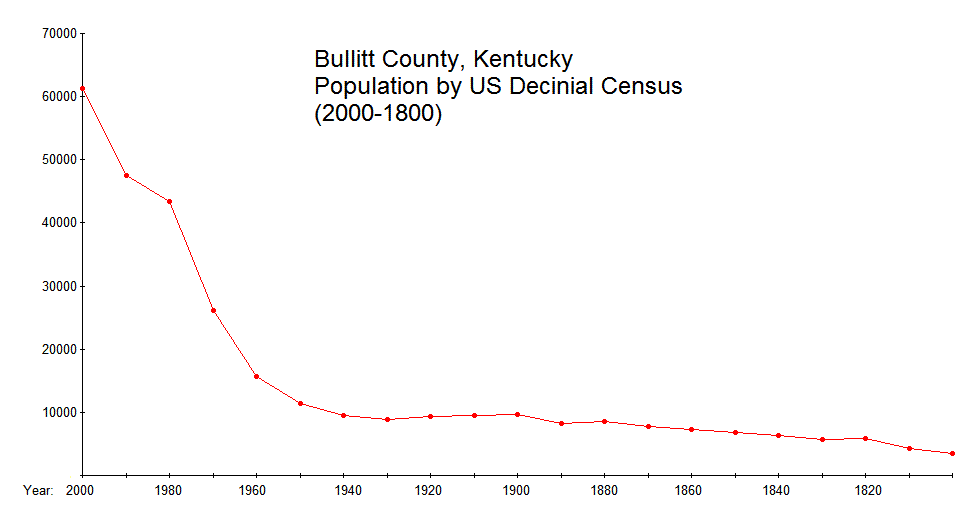
Graph of Bullitt County population by decade

Historical population
Census	Pop.	Note	%±
1800	3,542		—
1810	4,311		21.7%
1820	5,831		35.3%
1830	5,652		−3.1%
1840	6,334		12.1%
1850	6,774		6.9%
1860	7,289		7.6%
1870	7,781		6.7%
1880	8,521		9.5%
1890	8,291		−2.7%
1900	9,602		15.8%
1910	9,487		−1.2%
1920	9,328		−1.7%
1930	8,868		−4.9%
1940	9,511		7.3%
1950	11,349		19.3%
1960	15,726		38.6%
1970	26,090		65.9%
1980	43,346		66.1%
1990	47,567		9.7%
2000	61,236		28.7%
2010	74,319		21.4%
2020	82,217		10.6%
2025 (est.)	86,454	▲	5.2%
U.S. Decennial Census; 1790–1960 1900–1990; 1990–2000 2010–2020

=== 2020 census ===
As of the 2020 census, the county had a population of 82,217. The median age was 40.3 years. 23.4% of residents were under the age of 18 and 15.7% of residents were 65 years of age or older. For every 100 females there were 98.4 males, and for every 100 females age 18 and over there were 96.2 males age 18 and over.

The racial makeup of the county was 91.7% White, 1.3% Black or African American, 0.3% American Indian and Alaska Native, 0.5% Asian, 0.0% Native Hawaiian and Pacific Islander, 0.9% from some other race, and 5.3% from two or more races. Hispanic or Latino residents of any race comprised 2.6% of the population.

70.5% of residents lived in urban areas, while 29.5% lived in rural areas.

There were 31,409 households in the county, of which 33.9% had children under the age of 18 living with them and 22.0% had a female householder with no spouse or partner present. About 21.4% of all households were made up of individuals and 8.9% had someone living alone who was 65 years of age or older.

There were 32,704 housing units, of which 4.0% were vacant. Among occupied housing units, 80.6% were owner-occupied and 19.4% were renter-occupied. The homeowner vacancy rate was 0.8% and the rental vacancy rate was 6.2%.

=== 2000 census ===
As of the census of 2000, there were 61,236 people, 22,171 households, and 17,736 families residing in the county. The population density was 205 per square mile (79/km^{2}). There were 23,160 housing units at an average density of 77 per square mile (30/km^{2}). The racial makeup of the county was 98.07% White, 0.38% Black or African American, 0.34% Native American, 0.27% Asian, 0.01% Pacific Islander, 0.16% from other races, and 0.77% from two or more races. 0.63% of the population were Hispanics or Latinos of any race.

There were 22,171 households, out of which 39.00% had children under the age of 18 living with them, 65.40% were married couples living together, 10.40% had a female householder with no husband present, and 20.00% were non-families. 16.40% of all households were made up of individuals, and 5.40% had someone living alone who was 65 years of age or older. The average household size was 2.75 and the average family size was 3.07.

In the county, the population was spread out, with 27.20% under the age of 18, 8.60% from 18 to 24, 32.70% from 25 to 44, 23.70% from 45 to 64, and 7.80% who were 65 years of age or older. The median age was 34 years. For every 100 females, there were 98.90 males. For every 100 females age 18 and over, there were 97.20 males. It can be noted in the chart, the population surge in the 1970s. The few years of forced school racial integration in adjoining Jefferson County, known locally as 'bussing', had many with school age children relocating to Bullitt County in order to prevent their children from being 'bussed'.

The median income for a household in the county was $50,058 (2005), and the median income for a family was $49,481. Males had a median income of $35,851 versus $24,098 for females. The per capita income for the county was $18,339. About 6.20% of families and 7.90% of the population were below the poverty line, including 11.40% of those under age 18 and 7.60% of those age 65 or over.

== Economy ==
Bullitt County, which is bisected by I-65, the main north–south transportation corridor, has grown into a thriving distribution hub, and several of its major business parks are approximately 16 miles (26 km) from Louisville Muhammad Ali International Airport and UPS' global air-freight hub Worldport. More than 6,000,000 square feet (560,000 m^{2}) of distribution, warehousing and other complexes have been built and absorbed in Bullitt County since 2000, and additional construction is ongoing.

In May 2026, Averitt announced an investment that could exceed $113 million, retaining 182 jobs and creating 64 new full-time jobs, in a new regional distribution and logistics transportation campus in Bullitt County.

Bullitt County residents have easy access to major job centers such as Elizabethtown, Fort Knox, and Louisville.

=== Healthcare ===
In March 2024, Bullitt County opened its first full-service inpatient facility, the UofL Health – South Hospital, in Shepherdsville. The $78 million acute care hospital, with more than 100,000 square feet solved a major regional healthcare gap, as Bullitt County was without an inpatient hospital. The new hospital will have a capacity of 40 inpatient beds, shell space for 20 more, plus a 10-bed Intensive Care Unit (ICU). In May 2025, construction was underway on the new UofL Health – Brown Cancer Center, a $25 million regional cancer center, and Center for Rural Cancer Education and Research. The center will become part of the new UofL Health – South Hospital campus. In August 2026, the new Brown Cancer Center at South Hospital campus has completed construction, and is scheduled to begin seeing patients in September 2026.

=== Tourism ===
In July 2026, it was reported that tourism continued to play a vital role in Bullitt County's economy, generating an estimated $173.2 million in economic impact in 2025, and announced its fourth consecutive record-breaking year for tourism. Local attractions include the Bullitt County Wine, Whiskey & Ale Trail, and the family-friendly Bernheim Arboretum and Research Forest, located in Clermont.

== Politics ==
United States presidential election results for Bullitt County, Kentucky
Year	Republican		Democratic		Third party(ies)	
Year	No.	%	No.	%	No.	%
1880	275	24.86%	788	71.25%	43	3.89%
1884	302	31.66%	632	66.25%	20	2.10%
1888	429	29.63%	996	68.78%	23	1.59%
1892	398	28.05%	862	60.75%	159	11.21%
1896	799	39.01%	1,168	57.03%	81	3.96%
1900	772	34.63%	1,442	64.69%	15	0.67%
1904	593	30.92%	1,284	66.94%	41	2.14%
1908	726	33.36%	1,409	64.75%	41	1.88%
1912	209	10.48%	1,299	65.11%	487	24.41%
1916	826	35.27%	1,508	64.39%	8	0.34%
1920	1,393	35.23%	2,548	64.44%	13	0.33%
1924	946	33.04%	1,789	62.49%	128	4.47%
1928	1,793	50.45%	1,758	49.47%	3	0.08%
1932	1,088	27.11%	2,918	72.70%	8	0.20%
1936	647	20.63%	2,474	78.89%	15	0.48%
1940	813	25.35%	2,388	74.46%	6	0.19%
1944	876	29.44%	2,092	70.30%	8	0.27%
1948	673	27.86%	1,681	69.58%	62	2.57%
1952	1,292	37.80%	2,121	62.05%	5	0.15%
1956	2,007	46.78%	2,279	53.12%	4	0.09%
1960	2,683	52.40%	2,437	47.60%	0	0.00%
1964	1,417	26.59%	3,900	73.17%	13	0.24%
1968	1,965	31.14%	2,135	33.84%	2,210	35.02%
1972	4,517	59.80%	2,827	37.43%	209	2.77%
1976	3,639	38.40%	5,623	59.33%	215	2.27%
1980	6,364	50.60%	5,884	46.79%	328	2.61%
1984	9,556	65.11%	5,005	34.10%	115	0.78%
1988	8,859	59.01%	6,005	40.00%	149	0.99%
1992	7,745	40.83%	7,830	41.28%	3,394	17.89%
1996	8,697	47.28%	7,651	41.59%	2,047	11.13%
2000	14,054	61.91%	8,195	36.10%	452	1.99%
2004	19,433	67.88%	9,043	31.59%	151	0.53%
2008	20,102	65.42%	10,177	33.12%	447	1.45%
2012	21,306	67.04%	9,971	31.38%	502	1.58%
2016	26,210	72.67%	8,255	22.89%	1,604	4.45%
2020	30,708	73.12%	10,552	25.13%	738	1.76%
2024	32,299	74.75%	10,280	23.79%	630	1.46%

=== Elected officials ===
Elected officials as of January 3, 2025
U.S. House	Brett Guthrie (R)	KY 2
Ky. Senate	Michael J. Nemes (R)	38
Ky. House	Peyton Griffee (R)	26
Ky. House	Emily Callaway (R)	37
Ky. House	Thomas Huff (R)	49

== Education ==
Bullitt County is served by Bullitt County Public Schools, except for parts in Fort Knox, which are served by the Department of Defense Education Activity (DoDEA).

There are six county middle schools:

- Bernheim Middle School
- Bullitt Lick Middle School
- Eastside Middle School
- Hebron Middle School
- Mount Washington Middle School
- Zoneton Middle School

There are four county high schools:

- Bullitt Central High School, located in Shepherdsville, opened in 1970
- Bullitt East High School, located in Mount Washington
- North Bullitt High School, located in Hebron Estates (served by the Shepherdsville post office)
- Riverview High School (formerly 3 different schools)

Fort Knox Middle High School is the high school for Fort Knox.

== Communities ==
=== Cities ===
- Fox Chase
- Hebron Estates
- Hillview
- Hunters Hollow
- Lebanon Junction
- Mount Washington
- Pioneer Village
- Shepherdsville (county seat)

=== Census-designated place ===
- Brooks

=== Other unincorporated communities ===
- Brownington
- Clermont
- Solitude
- Zoneton

Although large-scale residential development has not made its way south of Shepherdsville, the growth is apparent in and around that town and in Mount Washington, as well as points north along I-65 towards Hillview. Both Shepherdsville and Mount Washington have stretched their boundaries such that they are nearly touching each other. The 10-mile (16 km) stretch of Kentucky 44 that connects the two towns has homes through nearly the entire expanse.

== See also ==
- National Register of Historic Places listings in Bullitt County, Kentucky
