= Zoneton, Kentucky =

Unincorporated community in Kentucky, United States

Zoneton
- Unincorporated community
- Location within the state of Kentucky Zoneton (the United States)
- Coordinates: 38°3′48″N 85°40′14″W
- Country: United States
- State: Kentucky
- County: Bullitt
- Elevation: 541 ft (165 m)
- Time zone: UTC-5 (Eastern (EST))
  - Summer (DST): UTC-4 (EST)
- GNIS feature ID: 507306

Zoneton is an unincorporated community located in Bullitt County, Kentucky, United States.

It is served by the Zoneton Fire Protection District.
