= Louisville and Nashville Railroad Lebanon Branch =

Former branch of the Louisville and Nashville Railroad

The former Louisville and Nashville Railroad Lebanon Branch (AKA Knoxville Branch) was 77 miles long and ran from Lebanon Junction in Bullitt County to near Mt. Vernon in Rockcastle County. Construction of the branch began in 1857, reaching Lebanon in that year. The line was extended to Crab Orchard in 1866 and completed in 1868. Most of the line was abandoned in 1987. The portion from Stanford to Mt. Vernon was abandoned during the 1990s.

== Timeline ==
- 1854 - Track is laid between Lebanon Junction off the Main Stem to New Haven
- 1857 - Lebanon reached on November 18, the branch line is 37.7 miles long running from Lebanon Junction to Lebanon.
- 1863 - John Hunt Morgan burns the depot at Lebanon during a battle with Federal troops there.
- 1864 - Lebanon Branch extension approved.
- 1865 - Gravel Switch reached by the railroad. The town is named after a spur off the Lebanon Branch used for loading gravel for ballast for track.
- 1866 - Parksville is reached on February 19. Goresburg, later renamed Junction City after arrival of the Cincinnati Southern, is reached on April 9. Stanford was reached on May 17, and Crab Orchard on July 1.
- 1879 - Cumberland & Ohio branch from Lebanon to Greensburg completed. The L&N later purchases this line in a foreclosure sale.
- 1883 - First train run from Louisville to Knoxville in March.
- 1900 - A passenger train derails on the Rolling Fork River bridge at Calvary on the Greensburg Branch.
- 1903 - Two freight trains collide in a head-on collision at Tilfords, a mile east of New Hope. Several crew members are killed.
- 1923 - Head on collision between Trains 52 and 55 at Nelsonville, KY.
- 1932 - Franklin D. Roosevelt visits Stanford on the Lebanon Branch during a whistle stop campaign tour.
- 1940 - Centralized Traffic Control signalling installed on the Lebanon Branch between Lebanon Junction and Lebanon.
- 1941 - Collision between two trains at St. Francis, KY.
- 1956 - The movie "Raintree County" is filmed using the Lebanon Branch for railroad scenes, the Baltimore & Ohio's William Mason is used in the movie.
- 1958 - Final passenger train run on the Lebanon Branch.
- 1979 - Final freight train run to Greensburg. The line between Campbellsville and Greensburg is abandoned afterwards.
- 1985 - Final trains on the Lebanon-Campbellsville portion of the Greensburg branch.
- 1987 - Last through freight train crosses the branch on July 8. CSX announces plans to abandon the line.
- 1990 - The Kentucky Railway Museum purchases 17 miles of the branch between New Hope and Boston, KY.

== Places of interest ==
=== New Hope-Lebanon ===
Between New Hope and Lebanon the line passes through a number of small towns that provide basic services and also a variety of interesting historic sites. These include churches in New Hope and St. Francis, and the Maker's Mark Distillery near Loretto. The largest town in this section is Lebanon, which has a restored downtown area with many historic buildings housing shops and restaurants. The railroad right of way passes one block behind the main street and is intact, being used as a parking area.

=== Lebanon-Stanford ===
Between Lebanon and Stanford the rail line passes through several small towns along the border between the Outer Bluegrass and the Knobs. Just west of Stanford the line passes near the site of historic Fort Logan. Though presently undeveloped, there are plans in the county for developing this as a historic site. In Stanford, they have successfully restored the Louisville & Nashville RR depot as a museum and community center. Also at the depot site are a playground, picnic gazebo, restored caboose and maintenance of way car, and a short walking trail on the right way.

=== East of Stanford ===
East of Stanford the line passes through what has become the new lake formed by the impoundment of Cedar Creek. This project was finished in 2002 and will provide boating, fishing, and other recreational opportunities. If a trail were to be developed, it would have to be rerouted from the original right of way, but it could be a vital part of this new recreational and natural area.

Just east of this lake is the historic William Whitley house. It is a state historic site and is open as a museum and park with a playground, picnic shelter, and restrooms. The line is intact and fairly clear as it passes this site.

Between the Whitley house and Mt. Vernon the line passes through a few small communities that offer restaurants, shops, and convenience stores. There are a number of creek crossings that offer lovely views, however the bridges have been removed. The last thru train passed here in July 1986, after which, the line was ripped out almost overnight from 10 ft west of Main Street, to Popes Creek Rd area, Lebanon KY. Remain trackage was used to serve the grain mill on far east Main St, as well as car storage on downtown sidings near the depot. Track from Stanford to near Mt. Vernon were removed around 1993.
