= Lebanon Junction, Kentucky =

- City
- Location of Lebanon Junction in Bullitt County, Kentucky.
- Coordinates: 37°50′09″N 85°43′27″W
- Country: United States
- State: Kentucky
- County: Bullitt
- Incorporated: 1895
- Named for: its position on the L&N railroad

Area
  - Total: 5.74 sq mi (14.87 km^{2})
  - Land: 5.64 sq mi (14.61 km^{2})
  - Water: 0.097 sq mi (0.25 km^{2})
- Elevation: 532 ft (162 m)

Population (2020)
  - Total: 1,746
  - Estimate (2022): 1,778
  - Density: 309.5/sq mi (119.49/km^{2})
- Time zone: UTC-5 (Eastern (EST))
  - Summer (DST): UTC-4 (EDT)
- ZIP code: 40150
- Area code: 502
- FIPS code: 21-44362
- GNIS feature ID: 2404904
- Website: https://lebanonjunctionky.com/

Lebanon Junction is a home rule-class city in Bullitt County, Kentucky, in the United States. The population was 1,746 as of the 2020 census, down from 1,813 as of the 2010 census.

== Geography ==
Lebanon Junction is located in southern Bullitt County, on the southeastern edge of Fort Knox. Interstate 65 passes through the city, with access to the downtown area from Exit 105. Via I-65 it is 13 miles (21 km) north to Shepherdsville, the county seat, and 32 miles (51 km) north to downtown Louisville. Elizabethtown is 14 miles (23 km) to the southwest via I-65.

The Rolling Fork river forms the southwest boundary of the city and also serves as the county line, with Hardin County on the opposite side. Nelson County is to the south, across Wilson Creek.

According to the United States Census Bureau, Lebanon Junction has a total area of 5.8 square miles (14.9 km^{2}), of which 5.6 square miles (14.6 km^{2}) is land and 0.12 square miles (0.3 km^{2}), or 1.71%, is water.

== History ==
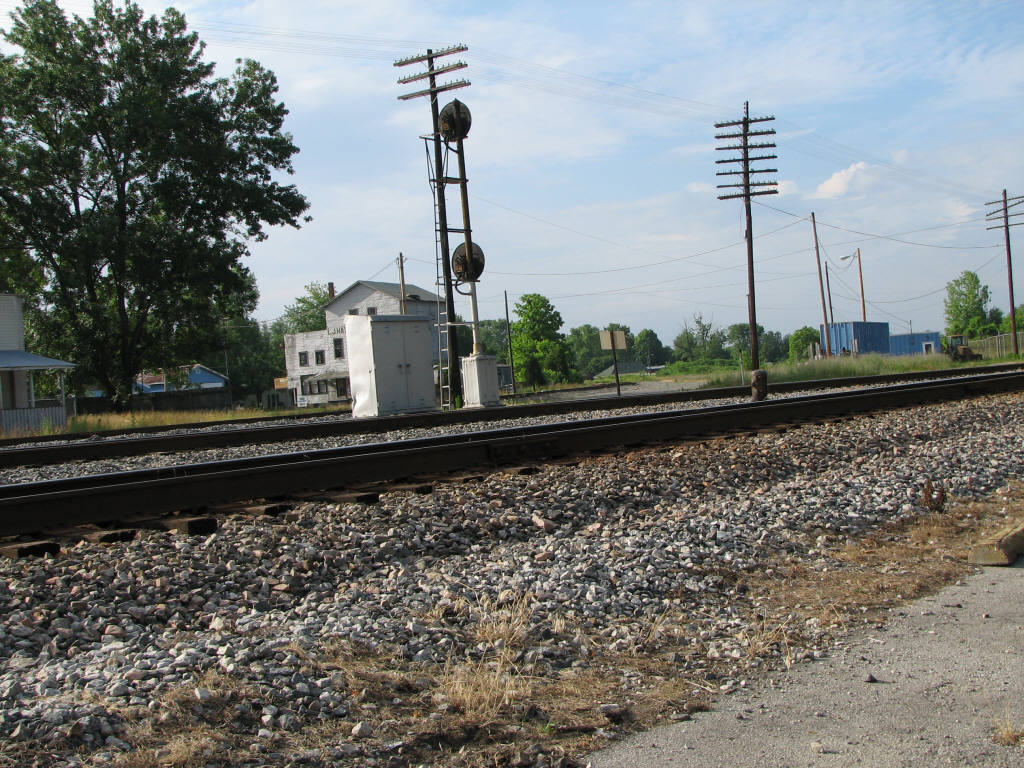
CSX Main Line and the old Lebanon Branch

Lebanon Junction sprang into existence from a railroad switching point that split Louisville and Nashville Railroad (now CSX Transportation) traffic off the mainline to the Lebanon Branch that ended in Lebanon, Kentucky. This branch was completed no later than March 8, 1858, and the town grew out of a need for railroad workers to man the terminal and switching station.

The city of Lebanon Junction was incorporated April 1, 1895. The initial population of the town was "about 700" as detailed in the official surveyor's description. The town grew and prospered until May 24, 1912, when a devastating fire swept through the business district, destroying several businesses and residences. This did not hamper the town's growth, however, and by the end of 1912 the business section was rebuilt, offering better facilities than before.

The town continued to grow, building a 1st–12th grade school in 1931. The school served as the center of town activities until 1970 when the public education system was consolidated into the Bullitt County school system as mandated by the state. Many a night, townsfolk would pack the gymnasium rebuilt in 1938 after the flood of 1937 to watch basketball games. The school even fielded a six-man football team.

Lebanon Junction was the site of the first parochial school in Bullitt County when Father Harold Ritter established the St. Benedict School in 1948. This school offered education in grades 1-12 from 1949 to 1965. In 1966 it was scaled back and offered 1-8th grades only. The school was closed in 2001.

Growth leveled off in the 1930s with the onset of the Great Depression and the centralization of railroad operations at the southern Louisville yards. This, coupled with the drastic decline in commuter train use, the development of diesel engines, and automated switching and traffic control, lowered the importance of the railroad to the town and vice versa.

Throughout its history, the town has been rocked by flooding along the Rolling Fork river; probably since its inception, but definitely since the great flood of 1937. Floods repeated to varying degrees in 1961, 1964, 1978, 1989, and 1997. After the flood of 1997, new levee work was completed, but that has yet to be tested by another flood.

Despite the many setbacks, both economic and natural, the town has persevered. Today its economic life revolves around its proximity to Interstate 65. Most of the economic growth of the town is centered on the highway exit now. In the 1980s, a gas station and large truck stop were constructed. In 1990, Publisher's Printing Company built a large printing facility just to the east of the exit.

Recent development in the town includes the aforementioned levee work, the construction of new wastewater processing lagoons, the shutdown of a dollar store, and various restaurants. A new public library, completed in the summer of 2010, recalls the railroad heritage of the town.

== Demographics ==
Historical population
Census	Pop.	Note	%±
1880	116		—
1900	599		—
1910	807		34.7%
1920	882		9.3%
1930	1,267		43.7%
1940	1,141		−9.9%
1950	1,243		8.9%
1960	1,527		22.8%
1970	1,571		2.9%
1980	1,581		0.6%
1990	1,741		10.1%
2000	1,801		3.4%
2010	1,813		0.7%
2020	1,746		−3.7%
2022 (est.)	1,778		1.8%
U.S. Decennial Census

=== 2020 census ===
As of the 2020 census, Lebanon Junction had a population of 1,746. The median age was 42.3 years. 20.9% of residents were under the age of 18 and 16.3% of residents were 65 years of age or older. For every 100 females there were 95.1 males, and for every 100 females age 18 and over there were 93.7 males age 18 and over.

0.0% of residents lived in urban areas, while 100.0% lived in rural areas.

There were 722 households in Lebanon Junction, of which 29.2% had children under the age of 18 living in them. Of all households, 43.8% were married-couple households, 18.6% were households with a male householder and no spouse or partner present, and 28.9% were households with a female householder and no spouse or partner present. About 28.9% of all households were made up of individuals and 12.9% had someone living alone who was 65 years of age or older.

There were 782 housing units, of which 7.7% were vacant. The homeowner vacancy rate was 2.3% and the rental vacancy rate was 3.0%.

Racial composition as of the 2020 census
Race	Number	Percent
White	1,623	93.0%
Black or African American	7	0.4%
American Indian and Alaska Native	6	0.3%
Asian	0	0.0%
Native Hawaiian and Other Pacific Islander	0	0.0%
Some other race	11	0.6%
Two or more races	99	5.7%
Hispanic or Latino (of any race)	17	1.0%

=== 2000 census ===
As of the census of 2000, there were 1,801 people, 716 households, and 499 families residing in the city. The population density was 337.9 inhabitants per square mile (130.5/km^{2}). There were 752 housing units at an average density of 141.1 units per square mile (54.5 units/km^{2}). The racial makeup of the city was 98.22% White, 0.56% African American, 0.28% Native American, 0.06% Asian, and 0.89% from two or more races. Hispanic or Latino of any race were 0.61% of the population.

There were 716 households, out of which 32.3% had children under the age of 18 living with them, 53.8% were married couples living together, 11.5% had a female householder with no husband present, and 30.3% were non-families. 27.4% of all households were made up of individuals, and 14.8% had someone living alone who was 65 years of age or older. The average household size was 2.52 and the average family size was 3.05.

In the city, the population was spread out, with 26.0% under the age of 18, 8.9% from 18 to 24, 29.0% from 25 to 44, 21.5% from 45 to 64, and 14.5% who were 65 years of age or older. The median age was 37 years. For every 100 females, there were 95.3 males. For every 100 females age 18 and over, there were 91.7 males.

The median income for a household in the city was $28,571, and the median income for a family was $38,021. Males had a median income of $30,000 versus $21,935 for females. The per capita income for the city was $15,890. About 11.8% of families and 14.8% of the population were below the poverty line, including 15.4% of those under age 18 and 17.6% of those age 65 or over.

== Schools ==
The town is a shadow of its former self in terms of education facilities. Today the town has one public school, Lebanon Junction Elementary School, offering grades K-5 only. The designated middle school (grades 6–8) is Bernheim Middle School, located just off Route 245 at exit 112 on I-65. The designated high school is Bullitt Central High School located in Shepherdsville just east of exit 117 off I-65.

The town also has a public library which is a branch of the Bullitt County Public Library system.
