= James M. Lloyd House =

Historic house in Kentucky, United States

- U.S. National Register of Historic Places
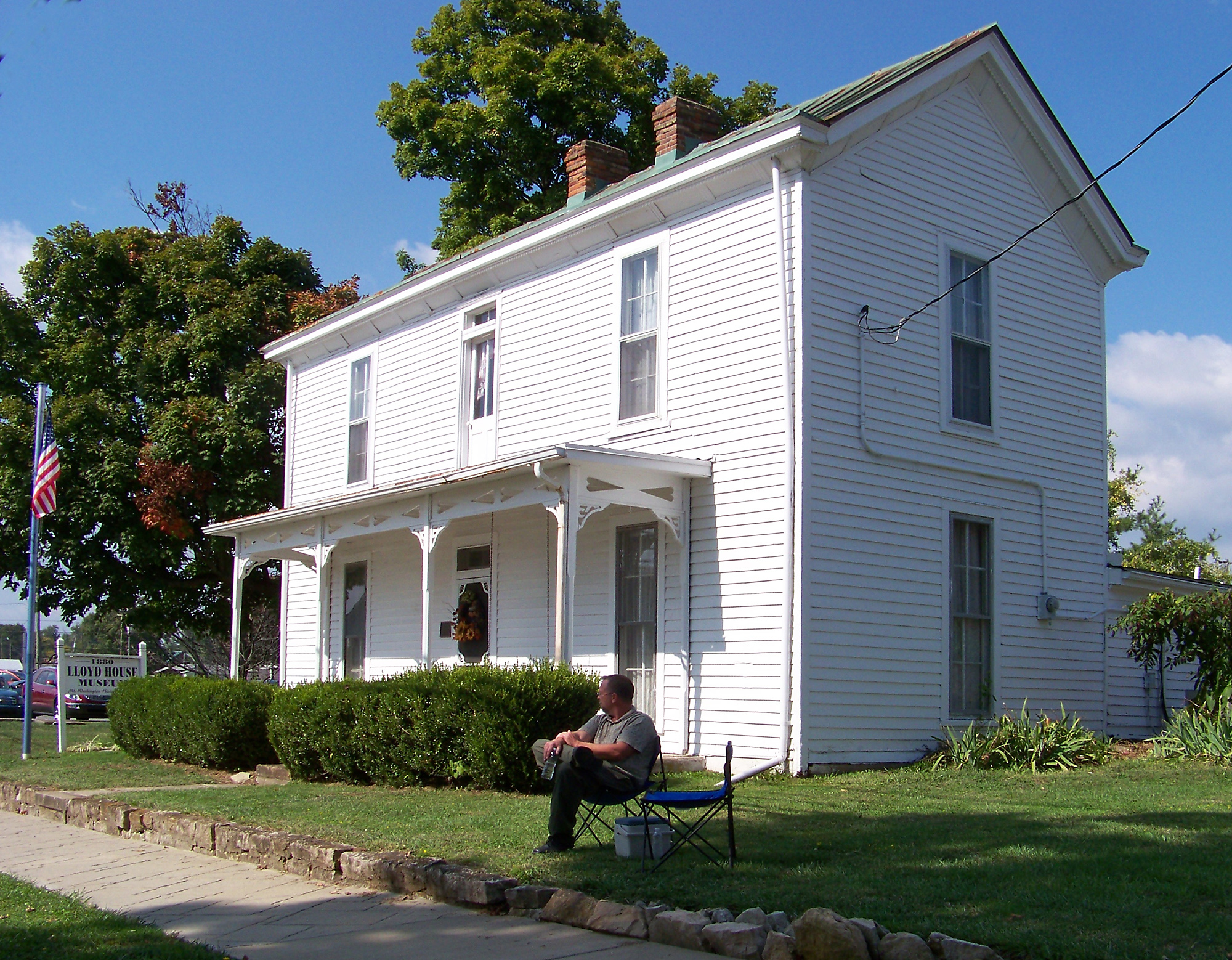

- Location within Kentucky Location within the United States
- Location: Jct. of US 31 E and East St., NE corner, Mt. Washington, Kentucky
- Coordinates: 38°2.9′N 85°32.4′W
- Area: 0.1 acres (0.040 ha)
- Architectural style: Italianate, Late Victorian
- NRHP reference No.: 93000048
- Added to NRHP: February 11, 1993

The James M. Lloyd House is a historic home located at the corner of Old Bardstown Road (US 31EX) and Dooley Drive in Mount Washington, Kentucky. After the original home on the property was lost to fire in 1880, James M. Lloyd, a skilled carpenter, constructed this new home for his family. The original two-story, three-bay structure with a central hall and stairwell rests on a limestone foundation. The frame and weatherboard siding were hewn from yellow poplar by the Collier mill of Mt. Washington. In the early 1900s a rear ell with a large side porch was added. In the 1940s the porch area was enclosed and became the kitchen and bathroom.

The home remained in the Lloyd family until 1989 when it was donated to the Mt. Washington Historical Society by Mr. Kenneth Lutes in memory of his wife, Anita Ann Dooley Lutes, a great-granddaughter of James M. Lloyd. The Lloyd House was added to the National Register of Historic Places in 1993.

== Preservation ==
Today, the home is the headquarters of the Mt. Washington Historical Society. The Historical Society continues in its quest to rehabilitate the home to serve as a meeting place, research center and museum dedicated to preserving and sharing the history of Mt. Washington. The home is open to the public for special events hosted by the Historical Society or for individual or group tours by appointment only.
