= Bullitt Central High School =

Secondary School, United States

Location
- 1330 Highway 44 East; Shepherdsville, KY 40165; United States; 37°59′59″N 85°41′52″W

Information
- Type: Public
- School district: Bullitt County Public Schools
- Principal: Joe Pat Lee
- Teaching staff: 76.74 (FTE)
- Grades: 9-12
- Enrollment: 1,359 (2023-2024)
- Student to teacher ratio: 17.71
- Colors: Maroon & Gray
- Nickname: Cougars
- Website: www.bullittschools.org/o/bchs

Bullitt Central High School is a secondary school located at 1330 Highway 44 East in the city of Shepherdsville, Kentucky, United States. Formed in 1970, it is part of the Bullitt County Public Schools district located in Bullitt County Kentucky.
