= Henry J. Barnes House =

Historic house in Kentucky, United States

- U.S. National Register of Historic Places
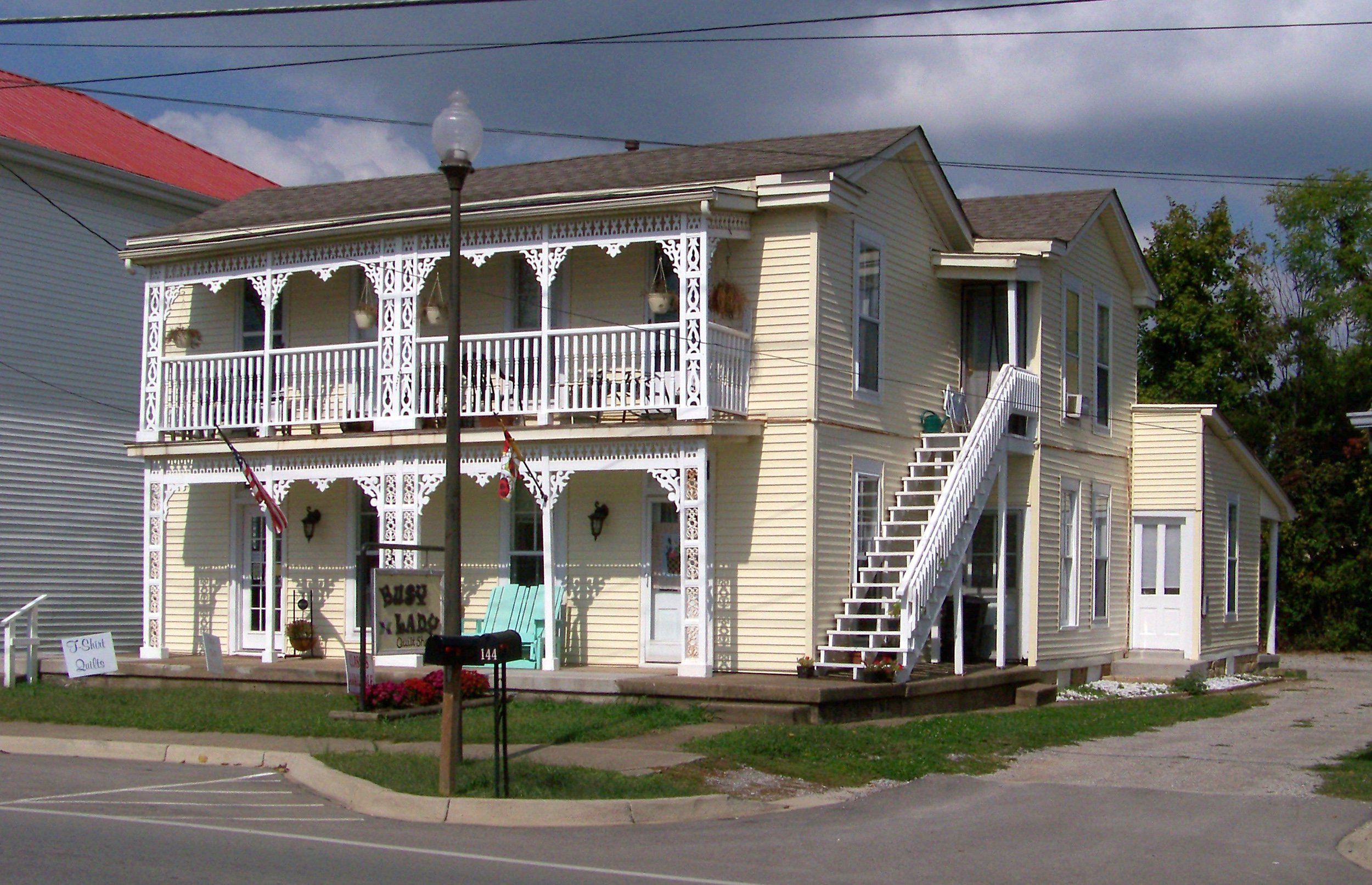
- Location: 144 N. Bardstown Rd., Mt. Washington, Kentucky
- Coordinates: 38°02′55″N 85°32′32″W
- Area: 0.2 acres (0.081 ha)
- Built: 1885
- Architectural style: Late Victorian, Italianate
- NRHP reference No.: 93000049
- Added to NRHP: March 1, 1993

The Henry J. Barnes House, at 144 N. Bardstown Rd. in Mt. Washington, Kentucky, was built in 1885. It was listed on the National Register of Historic Places in 1993.

It is a two-story double-pile four-bay "weatherboarded Cumberland form building with a two-tiered front porch."

The building thrived as the Busy Lady Quilt Shop, but after the business closed the property sat vacant. CVS purchased the building and surrounding property, hoping to construct one of their stores. Plans fell through, and the property was abandoned for years. The historic home was demolished February 26, 2024, even after the newly elected mayor of Mt. Washington had promised to save and revitalize it during his campaign.
