= Rick Bolus =

American basketball scout

Richard Jacob "Rick" Bolus (born September 26, 1949) is an American high school basketball scout and director of the Rick Bolus High Potential "Blue-Chip" Basketball Camp.

== Basketball scout ==
Bolus has been a basketball scout since 1973 and has served as a summer basketball camp director since 1980. Bolus maintains player rankings of high school basketball athletes for boys and girls from across the nation as well as for states in the Ohio Valley region such as Kentucky, Ohio, Illinois, and Indiana. His rankings and opinions are often cited by other media outlets such as ESPN, Sports Illustrated, CNN Headline News, and Rivals.com.

Bolus created the High Potential "Blue-Chip" Basketball Camp in 1980 to provide exposure for high school basketball players to college coaches and scouts. Over 30,000 players from across the United States and the world have attended his basketball camps.

Bolus serves as a consultant for various basketball events across the United States including a 5-year period as a player selector for the Kentucky Derby Festival Classic all-star game held annually before the Kentucky Derby at Freedom Hall in Louisville, Kentucky. He is currently a member of the Naismith Board of Selectors Prep Player of the Year. He also organized his own basketball events known as the "Blue-Chip" Basketball Shootouts which were held at Bellarmine University between 2001 and 2004 where future NBA athletes such as Kevin Durant, Rajon Rondo, Ty Lawson, and Brandan Wright showcased their talents for their respective high school teams. He now is a substitute for Bullitt County Public Schools, having been so since 1999.
