= Brownington, Kentucky =

Unincorporated community in Kentucky, United States

Brownington
- Unincorporated community
- Location within the state of Kentucky Brownington (the United States)
- Coordinates: 37°56′54″N 85°35′7″W
- Country: United States
- State: Kentucky
- County: Bullitt
- Elevation: 699 ft (213 m)
- Time zone: UTC-5 (Eastern (EST))
  - Summer (DST): UTC-4 (EST)
- GNIS feature ID: 507593

Brownington is an unincorporated community located in Bullitt County, Kentucky, United States.
