= Mount Washington, Kentucky =

- City
- Flag Seal

- Location of Mount Washington in Bullitt County, Kentucky.
- Coordinates: 38°02′35″N 85°33′18″W
- Country: United States
- State: Kentucky
- County: Bullitt
- Established: 1822
- Incorporated: 1833
- Reincorporated: 1954

Government
  - Mayor: Greg Gentry (Mayor-elect)
  - City Administrator: Elizabeth D. Hardin

Area
  - Total: 9.46 sq mi (24.50 km^{2})
  - Land: 9.42 sq mi (24.40 km^{2})
  - Water: 0.039 sq mi (0.10 km^{2})
- Elevation: 666 ft (203 m)

Population (2020)
  - Total: 18,090
  - Estimate (2022): 18,424
  - Density: 1,920.0/sq mi (741.33/km^{2})
- Time zone: UTC-5 (Eastern (EST))
  - Summer (DST): UTC-4 (EDT)
- ZIP code: 40047
- Area code: 502
- FIPS code: 21-54228
- GNIS feature ID: 2404327
- Website: mtwashingtonky.org

Mount Washington is a city in northeast Bullitt County, Kentucky, in the United States. The population was 18,090 at the 2020 census. The city is one of several surrounding Louisville that have experienced a sharp rise in population in the past three decades, becoming a commuter town.

== History ==
Mount Washington is located at what was once the crossroads of two stagecoach routes and was originally known as The Cross Roads. It was formally established in 1822 as Mount Vernon, after President George Washington's Virginia home, but it was unable to continue using the name because another town's post office had priority. At the time, the settlement housed c. 700 people and boasted three churches, two schools, six stores and groceries, five doctors, two taverns, and twelve mechanical trades. At the time of its (first) formal incorporation as a city in 1833, the town's name was changed to "Mount Washington", again in honor of the first United States president.

Mount Washington became the economic center of Bullitt County by the 1850s. In the autumn of 1862, during the Civil War, the town was held by John Wharton's Confederate cavalry, who skirmished with Maj. Gen. Thomas L. Crittenden's men north of Mount Washington along Floyds Fork on October 1. A defeat the following day led to a Confederate retreat from the area.

Through the nineteenth century, a two-room school building stood on the southern end of Bardstown Road (now Highway 31E), but in 1916 a new building consisting of four classrooms was built. Where the four-room classroom building once stood, now stands Mt. Washington Middle School. This building was constructed in the early 1940s as the high school. Mt. Washington Middle School had to expand and remodel in 1995 because the population was growing tremendously, and now supports over 200 classrooms and offices. Since then, another middle school had to be built on the other side of the city. That project was completed in 2006.

Mount Washington's industries aged, and by the 1930s it was no longer the most prominent town in the county. The decline continued when fire burned much of the business district on November 18, 1940. Mount Washington enjoyed an influx of new residents starting in the late 1960s with the opening of General Electric's Appliance Park nearby in Louisville. The population of Mount Washington grew from 2,020 in 1970 to over 9,000 by the 2010 census. Despite a downturn at the Appliance Park, eventually leading to the sale of GE's appliance division to Haier, Mount Washington continues as a commuter town of Louisville.

The events of the final call of the strip search phone call scam took place in Mount Washington in 2004. The local police department charged David R. Stewart with the crime, but he was acquitted in 2006.

=== Historic site ===
Three homes in Mt. Washington are listed on the National Register of Historic Places. Of particular note is the Lloyd House, which is in the care of the Mount Washington Historical Society and is currently being renovated to become a historic house museum.

- James M. Lloyd House
- Henry J. Barnes House
- Zack Stansbury House

== Geography ==
Mount Washington is located in northeastern Bullitt County. The city of Louisville is directly to the north; the downtown is 20 miles (32 km) northwest of the center of Mount Washington. U.S. Route 31E and U.S. Route 150 pass through the city, leading south 19 miles (31 km) to Bardstown.

According to the United States Census Bureau, Mount Washington has a total area of 6.1 square miles (15.8 km^{2}), of which 6.1 square miles (15.7 km^{2}) is land and 0.04 square miles (0.1 km^{2}), or 0.49%, is water.

== Demographics ==
Historical population
Census	Pop.	Note	%±
1830	227		—
1860	473		—
1870	340		−28.1%
1880	387		13.8%
1890	327		−15.5%
1900	1,093		234.3%
1960	1,173		—
1970	2,020		72.2%
1980	3,997		97.9%
1990	5,226		30.7%
2000	8,485		62.4%
2010	9,117		7.4%
2020	18,090		98.4%
2024 (est.)	18,863		4.3%
U.S. Decennial Census

=== 2020 census ===
As of the 2020 census, Mount Washington had a population of 18,090. The median age was 37.0 years. 27.2% of residents were under the age of 18 and 13.7% of residents were 65 years of age or older. For every 100 females there were 94.6 males, and for every 100 females age 18 and over there were 90.8 males age 18 and over.

98.3% of residents lived in urban areas, while 1.7% lived in rural areas.

There were 6,810 households in Mount Washington, of which 39.8% had children under the age of 18 living in them. Of all households, 54.8% were married-couple households, 14.0% were households with a male householder and no spouse or partner present, and 24.7% were households with a female householder and no spouse or partner present. About 22.7% of all households were made up of individuals and 11.0% had someone living alone who was 65 years of age or older.

There were 7,020 housing units, of which 3.0% were vacant. The homeowner vacancy rate was 0.8% and the rental vacancy rate was 5.9%.

Racial composition as of the 2020 census
Race	Number	Percent
White	16,799	92.9%
Black or African American	195	1.1%
American Indian and Alaska Native	41	0.2%
Asian	85	0.5%
Native Hawaiian and Other Pacific Islander	9	0.0%
Some other race	139	0.8%
Two or more races	822	4.5%
Hispanic or Latino (of any race)	399	2.2%

=== 2000 census ===
As of the 2000 census, there were 8,485 people, 3,111 households, and 2,945 families residing in the city. The population density was 1,588.8 inhabitants per square mile (613.4/km^{2}). There were 3,294 housing units at an average density of 616.8 per square mile (238.1/km^{2}). The racial makeup of the city was 98.26% White, 0.32% African American, 0.32% Native American, 0.15% Asian, 0.27% from other races, and 0.68% from two or more races. Hispanics or Latinos of any race were 0.58% of the population.

There were 3,111 households, out of which 43.8% had children under the age of 18 living with them, 62.3% were married couples living together, 12.2% had a female householder with no husband present, and 21.4% were non-families. 17.7% of all households were made up of individuals, and 5.3% had someone living alone who was 65 years of age or older. The average household size was 2.69 and the average family size was 3.03.

The age distribution was 29.0% under 18, 8.9% from 18 to 24, 34.8% from 25 to 44, 18.6% from 45 to 64, and 8.7% who were 65 or older. The median age was 32 years. For every 100 females, there were 91.9 males. For every 100 females age 18 and over, there were 90.0 males.

The median income for a household in the city was $43,813, and the median income for a family was $46,507. Males had a median income of $35,439 versus $23,600 for females. The per capita income for the city was $18,495. About 5.9% of families and 7.9% of the population were below the poverty line, including 11.8% of those under age 18 and 7.8% of those age 65 or over.

== Infrastructure ==
=== Education ===
Mount Washington is served by the Bullitt County Public Schools. There are four elementary schools, two middle schools, and one high school within the city limits. A new elementary school is currently under construction.

There are no colleges or universities in Mt. Washington.

Mount Washington has a public library, a branch of the Bullitt County Public Library.

==== Elementary schools ====
- Old Mill Elementary School
- Mount Washington Elementary School
- Pleasant Grove Elementary School
- Crossroads Elementary School

==== Middle schools ====
- Mount Washington Middle School
- Eastside Middle School

==== High schools ====
- Bullitt East High School

=== Transportation ===
The primary method of transportation in Mt. Washington is by road. Formerly named "The Crossroads", Kentucky Route 44 and a road signed as U.S. Route 31EX intersect in the heart of the city. A bypass through the city's east end carries the main line of U.S. Route 31E and creates a second north–south route through the town.

=== Fire protection ===
Several fire protection districts include portions of the city, including Mt Washington Fire Protection District.

== Government ==
Mount Washington is a home-rule class city and operates under a Mayor-Council form of government. The current mayor-elect of Mount Washington is Greg Gentry, who will take office in January 2027, succeeding current mayor Stuart Owen. The current city administrator is Elizabeth D. Hardin.

== Notable people ==
- W. A. Criswell, president of the Southern Baptist Convention 1968–70
- Marisha Ray, voice actress and producer
