= Bullitt East High School =

Location
- 11450 Highway 44 East; Mount Washington, Kentucky 40047; United States; 38°3′22″N 85°31′52″W

Information
- Type: Public
- Motto: "Do it the Charger Way!"
- Established: 1980
- School district: Bullitt County Public Schools
- Principal: Joshua Lightle
- Teaching staff: 85.00 (on an FTE basis)
- Grades: 9-12
- Enrollment: 1,664 (2023-2024)
- Student to teacher ratio: 19.58
- Campus type: Suburban
- Colors: Red & Gold
- Nickname: Chargers
- Website: www.bullittschools.org/o/behs

Bullitt East High School is a high school located at 11450 Highway 44 East in the city of Mount Washington, Kentucky, United States. It is part of the Bullitt County Public Schools district. Sports teams include: archery, swimming, football, soccer, tennis, track and field, baseball, softball, wrestling, basketball, volleyball, and cheerleading. Bullitt East High School offers a variety of AP classes and is partnered with KCTCS to offer rigorous dual credit courses.

== Notable alumni ==
- Amanda Matthews, sculptor and painter
- Derek Willis, Professional Basketball Player
