= Brooks, Kentucky =

Census-designated place in Kentucky, United States

- Census-designated place
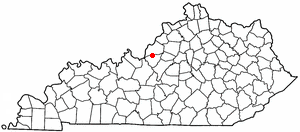
- Location of Brooks, Kentucky
- Coordinates: 38°03′57″N 85°43′04″W
- Country: United States
- State: Kentucky
- County: Bullitt

Area
  - Total: 3.71 sq mi (9.60 km^{2})
  - Land: 3.68 sq mi (9.54 km^{2})
  - Water: 0.023 sq mi (0.06 km^{2})
- Elevation: 532 ft (162 m)

Population (2020)
  - Total: 2,469
  - Density: 670.3/sq mi (258.81/km^{2})
- Time zone: UTC-5 (Eastern (EST))
  - Summer (DST): UTC-4 (EDT)
- ZIP code: 40109
- Area code: 502
- FIPS code: 21-09964
- GNIS feature ID: 2402721

Brooks is a census-designated place (CDP) in Bullitt County, Kentucky, United States. The population was 2,469 as of the 2020 census, stagnant from 2,401 in the 2010 census. Brooks was struck by a tornado in 1996.

== Geography ==
Brooks is located in northern Bullitt County. Its northern border is the county line, with Louisville/Jefferson County to the north. The eastern edge of the CDP is formed by Interstate 65, with access from Exit 121 (John Harper Highway). It is 15 miles (24 km) south of downtown Louisville via I-65.

According to the United States Census Bureau, the CDP has a total area of 4.5 square miles (11.7 km^{2}), of which 0.031 square miles (0.08 km^{2}), or 0.66%, is water.

== Demographics ==
Historical population
| Census | Pop. | Note | %± |
|---|---|---|---|
| 2020 | 2,469 | | — |
U.S. Decennial Census

=== 2020 census ===
As of the 2020 census, Brooks had a population of 2,469. The median age was 44.1 years. 22.1% of residents were under the age of 18 and 19.4% of residents were 65 years of age or older. For every 100 females there were 94.7 males, and for every 100 females age 18 and over there were 91.3 males age 18 and over.

83.6% of residents lived in urban areas, while 16.4% lived in rural areas.

There were 955 households in Brooks, of which 28.2% had children under the age of 18 living in them. Of all households, 48.0% were married-couple households, 17.4% were households with a male householder and no spouse or partner present, and 25.0% were households with a female householder and no spouse or partner present. About 22.7% of all households were made up of individuals and 8.9% had someone living alone who was 65 years of age or older.

There were 1,086 housing units, of which 12.1% were vacant. The homeowner vacancy rate was 0.5% and the rental vacancy rate was 34.8%.

Racial composition as of the 2020 census
| Race | Number | Percent |
|---|---|---|
| White | 2,167 | 87.8% |
| Black or African American | 38 | 1.5% |
| American Indian and Alaska Native | 15 | 0.6% |
| Asian | 19 | 0.8% |
| Native Hawaiian and Other Pacific Islander | 3 | 0.1% |
| Some other race | 92 | 3.7% |
| Two or more races | 135 | 5.5% |
| Hispanic or Latino (of any race) | 184 | 7.5% |

=== 2000 census ===
As of the census of 2000, there were 2,678 people, 1,032 households, and 762 families residing in the CDP. The population density was 571.7 inhabitants per square mile (220.7/km^{2}). There were 1,083 housing units at an average density of 231.2 per square mile (89.3/km^{2}). The racial makeup of the CDP was 97.31% White, 0.71% African American, 0.67% Native American, 0.22% Asian, 0.19% from other races, and 0.90% from two or more races. Hispanic or Latino of any race were 0.90% of the population.

There were 1,032 households, out of which 34.1% had children under the age of 18 living with them, 56.4% were married couples living together, 12.1% had a female householder with no husband present, and 26.1% were non-families. 20.6% of all households were made up of individuals, and 4.7% had someone living alone who was 65 years of age or older. The average household size was 2.59 and the average family size was 3.00.

In the CDP, the population was spread out, with 25.8% under the age of 18, 8.8% from 18 to 24, 31.7% from 25 to 44, 27.6% from 45 to 64, and 6.2% who were 65 years of age or older. The median age was 36 years. For every 100 females, there were 99.0 males. For every 100 females age 18 and over, there were 97.1 males.

The median income for a household in the CDP was $41,824, and the median income for a family was $51,146. Males had a median income of $37,225 versus $23,476 for females. The per capita income for the CDP was $17,675. About 5.9% of families and 10.6% of the population were below the poverty line, including 17.7% of those under age 18 and 6.9% of those age 65 or over.
