= Hebron Estates, Kentucky =

- City
- Location of Hebron Estates in Bullitt County, Kentucky.
- Coordinates: 38°03′00″N 85°40′05″W
- Country: United States
- State: Kentucky
- County: Bullitt
- Incorporated: 1984

Area
  - Total: 0.59 sq mi (1.53 km^{2})
  - Land: 0.59 sq mi (1.53 km^{2})
  - Water: 0 sq mi (0.00 km^{2})
- Elevation: 538 ft (164 m)

Population (2020)
  - Total: 1,014
  - Density: 1,716.9/sq mi (662.91/km^{2})
- Time zone: UTC-5 (Eastern (EST))
  - Summer (DST): UTC-4 (EDT)
- ZIP code: 40165
- Area code: 502
- FIPS code: 21-35545
- GNIS feature ID: 2404674
- Website: https://www.cityofhebronestates.com/

Hebron Estates is a home rule-class city in Bullitt County, Kentucky, in the United States. The population was 1,014 as of the 2020 census, a small decrease from 1,087 in the 2010 census.

== Geography ==
Hebron Estates is located in northern Bullitt County 17 miles (27 km) south of downtown Louisville. Kentucky Route 61 (North Preston Highway) forms the western border of the community.

According to the United States Census Bureau, the city has a total area of 0.62 square miles (1.6 km^{2}), all land.

== Demographics ==
Historical population
| Census | Pop. | Note | %± |
|---|---|---|---|
| 1990 | 930 | | — |
| 2000 | 1,104 | | 18.7% |
| 2010 | 1,087 | | −1.5% |
| 2020 | 1,014 | | −6.7% |
U.S. Decennial Census

At the 2000 census, there were 1,104 people, 432 households and 326 families residing in the city. The population density was 1,872.9 inhabitants per square mile (723.1/km^{2}). There were 442 housing units at an average density of 749.9 per square mile (289.5/km^{2}). The racial makeup of the city was 97.83% White, 0.18% African American, 0.18% Native American, 0.54% Asian, 0.18% from other races, and 1.09% from two or more races.

There were 432 households, of which 27.8% had children under the age of 18 living with them, 68.1% were married couples living together, 4.9% had a female householder with no husband present, and 24.5% were non-families. 19.4% of all households were made up of individuals, and 4.4% had someone living alone who was 65 years of age or older. The average household size was 2.56 and the average family size was 2.96.

Age distribution was 20.2% under the age of 18, 10.1% from 18 to 24, 28.5% from 25 to 44, 32.3% from 45 to 64, and 8.9% who were 65 years of age or older. The median age was 41 years. For every 100 females, there were 98.9 males. For every 100 females age 18 and over, there were 96.7 males.

The median household income was $51,146, and the median family income was $59,732. Males had a median income of $40,511 versus $26,875 for females. The per capita income for the city was $22,748. None of the families and 2.0% of the population were living below the poverty line, including no under eighteens and 5.7% of those over 64.
