= 1970 First National Tennis Classic – Singles =

Singles
- 1970 First National Tennis Classic

Final
- Champion: (Australia) Rod Laver
- Runner-up: (Australia) John Newcombe
- Score: 6–3, 6–3

Details
- Draw: 16

Events
Singles	Doubles
Louisville Open	· 1971 →

The 1970 First National Tennis Classic – Singles was an event of the 1970 First National Tennis Classic men's tennis tournament and was played at the Louisville Tennis Center in Louisville, Kentucky in the United States from July 29 through August 3, 1970. The draw consisted of 16 players. Rod Laver won the singles title, defeating John Newcombe in the final, 6–3, 6–3.

== Draw ==
=== Key ===
- Q = Qualifier
- WC = Wild card
- LL = Lucky loser
- Alt = Alternate
- SE = Special exempt
- PR = Protected ranking
- ITF = ITF entry
- JE = Junior exempt
- w/o = Walkover
- r = Retired
- d = Defaulted
- SR = Special ranking

First Round
(Australia) John Newcombe	6	6
(South Africa) Raymond Moore	0	4
(South Africa) Cliff Drysdale	6	6
(United States) Bob Lutz	2	2
(Spain) Andrés Gimeno	4	6	6
(United Kingdom) Mark Cox	6	0	2
(Australia) Tony Roche	6	6
(Egypt) Ismail El Shafei	2	1
(Australia) Ken Rosewall	6	6
(France) Pierre Barthès	4	2
(Australia) Roy Emerson	6	6
(United Kingdom) Graham Stilwell	2	2
(United States) Dennis Ralston	6	6
(Australia) Fred Stolle	2	4
(Australia) Rod Laver	6	6
(United States) Ronald Holmberg	2	2

Quarterfinals
(Australia) John Newcombe	6	6
(South Africa) Cliff Drysdale	3	4
(Spain) Andrés Gimeno	6	6	3
(Australia) Tony Roche	8	1	6
(Australia) Ken Rosewall	6	6
(Australia) Roy Emerson	4	1
(United States) Dennis Ralston	3	4
(Australia) Rod Laver	6	6

Semifinals
(Australia) John Newcombe	6	8
(Australia) Tony Roche	3	6
(Australia) Ken Rosewall	4	6	1
(Australia) Rod Laver	6	1	6

Final
(Australia) John Newcombe	3	3
(Australia) Rod Laver	6	6
