= 1970 First National Tennis Classic – Doubles =

Doubles
- 1970 First National Tennis Classic

Final
- Champion: (Australia) John Newcombe (Australia) Tony Roche
- Runner-up: (Australia) Roy Emerson (Australia) Rod Laver
- Score: 8–6, 5–7, 6–4

Details
- Draw: 8

Events
| Singles | Doubles |
| Louisville Open | · 1971 → |

The 1970 First National Tennis Classic – Doubles was an event of the 1970 First National Tennis Classic men's tennis tournament and was played at the Louisville Tennis Center in Louisville, Kentucky in the United States from July 29 through August 3, 1970. The draw consisted of eight teams. John Newcombe and Tony Roche won the singles title, defeating Roy Emerson and Rod Laver in the final, 8–6, 5–7, 6–4.

== Draw ==
=== Key ===
- Q = Qualifier
- WC = Wild card
- LL = Lucky loser
- Alt = Alternate
- SE = Special exempt
- PR = Protected ranking
- ITF = ITF entry
- JE = Junior exempt
- w/o = Walkover
- r = Retired
- d = Defaulted
- SR = Special ranking

Quarterfinals
(Australia) John Newcombe (Australia) Tony Roche | 6 | 3 | 6
(South Africa) Cliff Drysdale (United States) Ronald Holmberg | 3 | 6 | 3
(United Kingdom) Mark Cox (United Kingdom) Graham Stilwell | 7 | 6
(United States) Bob Lutz (United States) Dennis Ralston | 5 | 1
(Australia) Roy Emerson (Australia) Rod Laver | 6 | 3 | 6
(Egypt) Ismail El Shafei (South Africa) Raymond Moore | 0 | 6 | 3
(Australia) Ken Rosewall (Australia) Fred Stolle | 6 | 6
(France) Pierre Barthès (Spain) Andrés Gimeno | 1 | 2

Semifinals
(Australia) John Newcombe (Australia) Tony Roche | 8 | 3 | 6
(United Kingdom) Mark Cox (United Kingdom) Graham Stilwell | 6 | 6 | 4
(Australia) Roy Emerson (Australia) Rod Laver | 7 | 6
(Australia) Ken Rosewall (Australia) Fred Stolle | 5 | 3

Final
(Australia) John Newcombe (Australia) Tony Roche | 8 | 5 | 6
(Australia) Roy Emerson (Australia) Rod Laver | 6 | 7 | 4
