= 1974 Louisville Open =

- Date: July 29 – August 5
- Edition: 5th
- Category: Grand Prix (Grade AA)
- Draw: 64S / 32D
- Prize money: $100,000
- Surface: Clay / outdoor
- Location: Louisville, USA
- Venue: Louisville Tennis Center

Champions

Singles
- (Argentina) Guillermo Vilas

Doubles
- (United States) Charlie Pasarell / (United States) Erik van Dillen
← 1973 ·	Louisville Open	· 1975 →

The 1974 Louisville Open, also known as the First National Tennis Classic, was a men's tennis tournament played on outdoor clay courts at the Louisville Tennis Center in Louisville, Kentucky, USA. It was the fifth edition of the tournament and was held from 29 July through 5 August 1974. The tournament was part of the Grand Prix tennis circuit and categorized in Group AA. The singles final was won by tenth-seeded Guillermo Vilas who received the $16,000 first prize money and 80 Grand Prix points.

== Finals ==
=== singles ===
(Argentina) Guillermo Vilas defeated (Chile) Jaime Fillol 6–4, 7–5

- It was Vilas' fourth singles title of the year and the sixth singles title of his career

=== doubles ===
(United States) Charlie Pasarell / (United States) Erik van Dillen defeated (West Germany) Jürgen Fassbender / (West Germany) Hans-Jürgen Pohmann 6–2, 6–3
