= 1970 First National Tennis Classic =

- Date: July 29 – August 3
- Edition: 1st
- Category: Grand Prix (Class 2); WCT
- Draw: 16S / 8D
- Prize money: $25,000
- Surface: Clay / outdoor
- Location: Louisville, Kentucky, U.S.
- Venue: Louisville Tennis Center

Champions

Singles
- (Australia) Rod Laver

Doubles
- (Australia) John Newcombe / (Australia) Tony Roche
Louisville Open	· 1971 →

The 1970 First National Tennis Classic, also known as the Louisville Open, was a men's tennis tournament played on outdoor clay courts at the Louisville Tennis Center in Louisville, Kentucky in the United States. It was the inaugural edition of the tournament and was held from July 29 through August 3, 1970. The tournament was part of both the 1970 Grand Prix tennis circuit, categorized in Class 2, as well as the 1970 World Championship Tennis season and had total prize money of $25,000. The singles final was won by Rod Laver who earned $5,000 first-prize money as well as eight ranking points.

== Finals ==
=== Singles ===
(Australia) Rod Laver defeated (Australia) John Newcombe 6–3, 6–3

- It was Laver's 7th singles title of the year and the 35th of his career in the Open Era.

=== Doubles ===
(Australia) John Newcombe / (Australia) Tony Roche defeated (Australia) Roy Emerson / (Australia) Rod Laver 8–6, 5–7, 6–4
