= Poplar Level, Louisville =

Human settlement in Louisville, Kentucky, USA

Coordinates: 38°12′27″N 85°42′31″W

Poplar Level is a neighborhood five miles (8 km) southeast of downtown Louisville, Kentucky, United States. It is part of the larger Camp Zachary Taylor area.

Named for the poplar wood planks that originally made up Poplar Level Road, the main roadway through the neighborhood that stretches from Germantown to GE Appliance Park, it is generally bounded by Eastern Parkway to the north, Poplar Level road to the west, Newburg Road to the east, and Interstate 264 to the south. The South Fork of Beargrass Creek runs through the neighborhood.

== Neighborhood characteristics ==
With many parklands, such as Joe Creason Park, two large cemeteries, Louisville Cemetery and Calvary Cemetery, the Beargrass Creek State Nature Preserve and the Louisville Zoo, less than 20% of land in Poplar Level contains residential development.

While many of the southern portions of Poplar Level were developed as part of Camp Zachary Taylor in 1917, most modern residential development occurred in the 1950s, while most modern commercial development, such as area Kmart and Kroger stores, occurred in the 1960s.

A resurgence of commercial development began in 2006, with the development of the Villages of Audubon, the first major commercial development in Poplar Level in over 20 years, adjacent to Norton Audubon Hospital.

== Attractions and landmarks ==
- Beargrass Creek State Nature Preserve, dedicated Feb. 17, 1982, is a 41-acre second growth woodland in Jefferson County. The preserve is co-managed with the Louisville Nature Center.
- Part of Bellarmine University opened on October 3, 1950. Now a Master's I, Catholic university.
- Calvary Cemetery (Louisville), a Catholic cemetery opened in 1921.
- German-American Club of Louisville, founded in 1878 as the Sozialer Männerchor. The club strives to promote German Culture through the choir and many other events throughout the year. The club is 100% run by volunteers.
- Joe Creason Park, named after Joe Creason; acquired by the City of Louisville in the 1960s from Bellarmine University, originally the estate of Ben Collins.
- Louisville Cemetery, located near the intersection of Poplar Level and Eastern Parkway. Opened by 1886 in a then-rural setting and has traditionally buried only African Americans.
- Louisville Nature Center, a 501(c)(3) non-profit organization whose mission is to be a catalyst for conservation through environmental education and connection to nature for every person.
- Louisville Zoo, a non-profit organization and state zoo of Kentucky, dedicated to its mission to “Better the Bond Between People and Our Planet” by providing excellent care for animals, a great experience for visitors, and leadership in conservation education. The Zoo's collections which include botanical gardens are accredited by the Association of Zoos and Aquariums (AZA). The Louisville Zoo is also an agency of Louisville Metro Government.
- Louisville Mega Cavern a former limestone mine, now used for business, storage, recycling, and tourism.
- Norton Audubon Hospital, opened originally as St. Joseph's Infirmary in 1832.
- Peace Hospital, founded by the Sisters of Charity of Nazareth in 1951, is now one of the largest private psychiatric hospitals in America. Owned by UofL Health.
- St. Xavier High School, an all-male Catholic college preparatory school sponsored by the Xaverian Brothers since 1864.

== Demographics ==
As of the 2000 census, it is estimated that there were 1,780 people and 681 households residing in the Poplar Level neighborhood. The racial makeup is 96.30% White, 2.20% Black or African American, and 0.9% listed as some other race. Hispanics or Latinos of any race make up 0.06% of the population.

College graduates are estimated to be 39.9% of the population, while people without a high school degree are estimated at 13.4%. Females outnumber males 54.6% to 45.4%.
