= Banded cichlid =

Scientific classification
- Kingdom: Animalia
- Phylum: Chordata
- Class: Actinopterygii
- Order: Cichliformes
- Family: Cichlidae
- Genus: Heros
- Species: H. severus

Binomial name
- Heros severus Heckel, 1840

Synonyms
- Cichlasoma severum (Heckel, 1840)

Species of fish

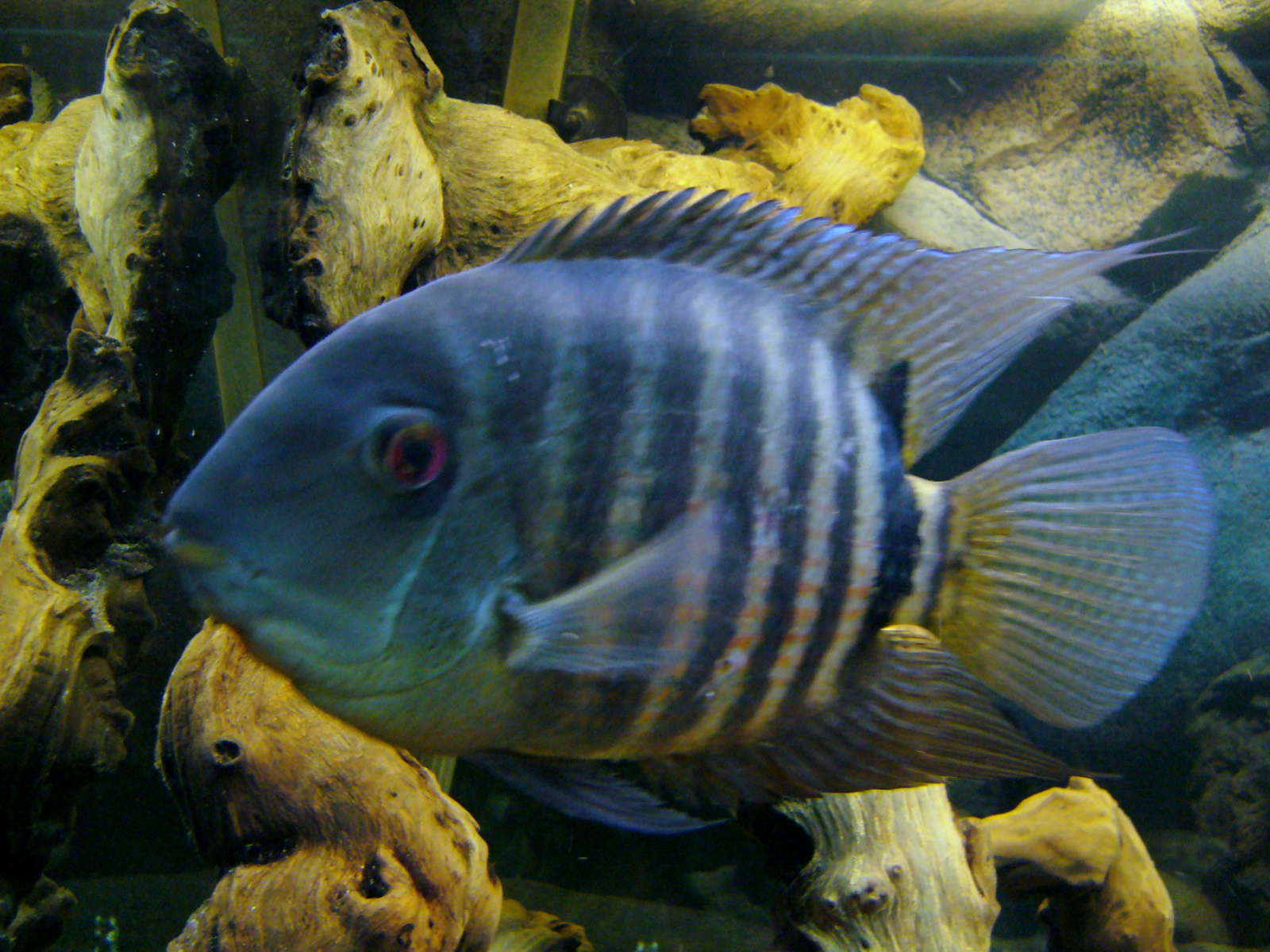
Heros severus

Heros severus (previously known as Cichlasoma severum), is a species of tropical freshwater cichlid native to the upper Orinoco and upper Rio Negro basins in South America. It has historically been confused with several other species in the genus, most recently H. liberifer. Heros severus typically grow to around 13.5 cm, with a maximum length reaching to about 20 cm. They are aquatic vegetarians that primarily eat small benthic invertebrates and other plant material in their habitat. Common names for H. severus are striped cichlid, sedate cichlid, deacon, convict fish.

This species is rarely found in the aquarium trade where the more common Heros efasciatus is found instead. Heros severus was first identified in 1840, but it was misidentified for many years. Until 2015 Heros severus was thought to be the mouth brooder that was in the aquarium trade. Originally in 1840 the H. severus was characterised as having a partially formed 7th band, but the identification was dismissed as an anomaly in the collected fish. In 2015 the true Heros severus was discovered, and had the tell tale partial 7th band that was described in 1840, this was known for a short time has Heros sp.' Curare' or Tiger severum until officially named as the true severus. The mouthbrooder who previously was thought to be Heros severus was classified as Heros liberifer by Staeck, Wolfgang & I. Schindler.
