= 1977 Louisville Open =

- Date: July 25 – August 1
- Edition: 8th
- Category: Grand Prix (Four Star)
- Draw: 64S / 32D
- Prize money: $125,000
- Surface: Clay / outdoor
- Location: Louisville, Kentucky, U.S.
- Venue: Louisville Tennis Center

Champions

Singles
- (Argentina) Guillermo Vilas

Doubles
- (Australia) John Alexander / (Australia) Phil Dent
- Louisville Open

The 1977 Louisville Open, also known as the Louisville International Tennis Classic, was a men's tennis tournament played on outdoor clay courts at the Louisville Tennis Center in Louisville, Kentucky, United States. It was the eighth edition of the tournament and was held from 25 July through August 1, 1977. The tournament was part of the Grand Prix tennis circuit and categorized as a Four Star event. The singles final was won by first-seeded Guillermo Vilas who received $20,000 first prize money. It was Vilas' third title win at the tournament after 1974 and 1975.

== Finals ==
=== Singles ===
(Argentina) Guillermo Vilas defeated (United States) Eddie Dibbs 1–6, 6–0, 6–1

- It was Vilas' 7th singles title of the year and the 26th of his career.

=== Doubles ===
(Australia) John Alexander / (Australia) Phil Dent defeated (Australia) Chris Kachel / (Australia) Cliff Letcher 6–1, 6–4
