= Convict fish =

Convict fish may refer to:

- Pholidichthys leucotaenia, a sea-dwelling species
- Banded cichlid
- Convict cichlid
- Archosargus probatocephalus, a species of fish native to the Atlantic Ocean also known as the convict fish
- Stripey
