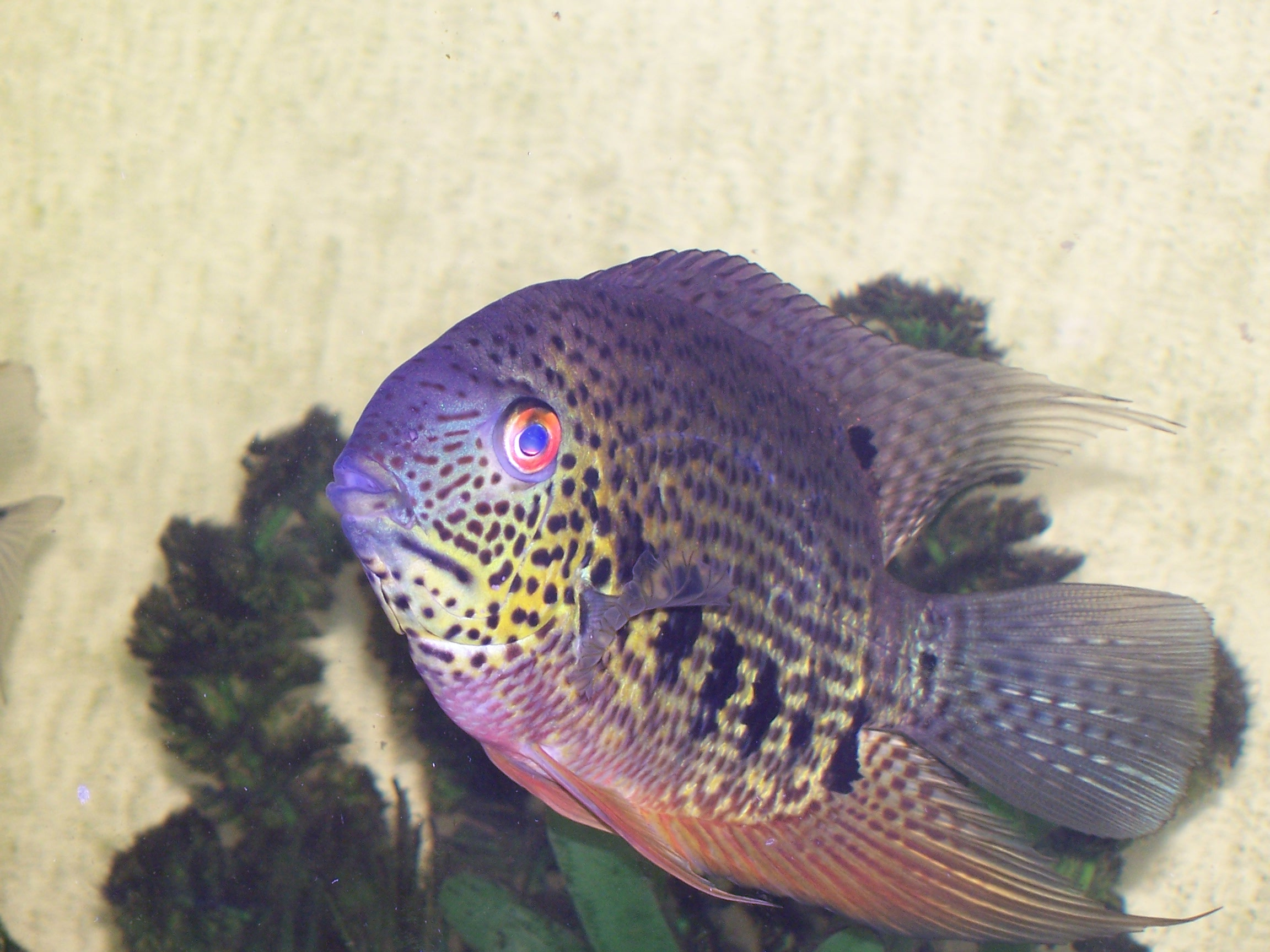

Scientific classification
- Kingdom: Animalia
- Phylum: Chordata
- Class: Actinopterygii
- Order: Cichliformes
- Family: Cichlidae
- Genus: Heros
- Species: H. notatus

Binomial name
- Heros notatus (Jardine, 1843)

Synonyms
- Centrarchus notatus Jardine, 1843

= Heros notatus =

Species of fish

Heros notatus is a species of tropical freshwater cichlid native to Rio Negro and Essequibo River in South America.

== Aquarium trade ==
This species is uncommon in the aquarium trade.

The species generally found in the aquarium trade Heros efasciatus and its man-made color morphs(red and gold) as well as the unspecified H. sp.'rotkeil'.
