= 1976 Louisville Open =

- Date: July 26 – August 2
- Edition: 7th
- Category: Grand Prix (Four Star)
- Draw: 64S / 32D
- Prize money: $125,000
- Surface: Clay / outdoor
- Location: Louisville, Kentucky, US
- Venue: Louisville Tennis Center

Champions

Singles
- (United States) Harold Solomon

Doubles
- (South Africa) Byron Bertram / (South Africa) Pat Cramer
- Louisville Open

The 1976 Louisville Open, also known as the Louisville International Tennis Classic, was a men's tennis tournament played on outdoor clay courts at the Louisville Tennis Center in Louisville, Kentucky in the United States. It was the seventh edition of the tournament and was held from 26 July through 2 August 1976. The tournament was part of the Grand Prix tennis circuit and categorized as Four Star. The singles final was won by Harold Solomon who received $20,000 first prize money.

== Finals ==
=== Singles ===
(United States) Harold Solomon defeated (Poland) Wojciech Fibak 6–2, 7–5

- It was Solomon's 3rd singles title of the year and the 8th of his career.

=== Doubles ===
(South Africa) Byron Bertram / (South Africa) Pat Cramer defeated (United States) Stan Smith / (United States) Erik van Dillen 6–3, 6–4
