= 1973 Louisville Open =

- Date: July 30 – August 5
- Edition: 4th
- Category: Grand Prix (Grade A)
- Draw: 64S / 32D
- Prize money: $75,000
- Surface: Clay / outdoor
- Location: Louisville, USA
- Venue: Louisville Tennis Center

Champions

Singles
- (Spain) Manuel Orantes

Doubles
- (Spain) Manuel Orantes / (Romania) Ion Țiriac
- Louisville Open

The 1973 Louisville Open, also known as the First National Tennis Classic, was a men's tennis tournament played on outdoor clay courts at the Louisville Tennis Center in Louisville, Kentucky, USA. It was the fourth edition of the tournament and was held from 30 July through 5 August 1973. The tournament was part of the Grand Prix tennis circuit and categorized in Group A. The singles final was won by fourth-seeded Manuel Orantes who earned 80 Grand Prix points.

== Finals ==
=== Singles ===
(Spain) Manuel Orantes defeated (Australia) John Newcombe 3–6, 6–3, 6–4

- It was Orantes' third singles title of the year and the tenth singles title of his career

=== Doubles ===
(Spain) Manuel Orantes / (Romania) Ion Țiriac defeated (United States) Clark Graebner / (Australia) John Newcombe 0–6, 6–4, 6–3
