= 1975 Louisville Open =

- Date: July 28 – August 5
- Edition: 6th
- Category: Grand Prix (Grade AA)
- Draw: 64S / 32D
- Prize money: $100,000
- Surface: Clay / outdoor
- Location: Louisville, US
- Venue: Louisville Tennis Center

Champions

Singles
- (Argentina) Guillermo Vilas

Doubles
- (Poland) Wojciech Fibak / (Argentina) Guillermo Vilas (India) Anand Amritraj / (India) Vijay Amritraj
- Louisville Open

The 1975 Louisville Open, also known as the First National Tennis Classic, was a men's tennis tournament played on outdoor clay courts at the Louisville Tennis Center in Louisville, Kentucky in the United States. It was the sixth edition of the tournament and was held from July 28 through August 5, 1975. The tournament was part of the Grand Prix tennis circuit and categorized in Group AA. The singles final was delayed by one day due to rain and was won by defending champion Guillermo Vilas who received the $16,000 first prize money. The doubles final was not played due to rain and the prize money was shared.

== Finals ==
=== Singles ===
(Argentina) Guillermo Vilas defeated (Romania) Ilie Năstase 6–4, 6–3

- It was Vilas' 4th singles title of the year and the 12th of his career.

=== Doubles ===
(Poland) Wojciech Fibak / (Argentina) Guillermo Vilas and (India) Anand Amritraj / (India) Vijay Amritraj not played
