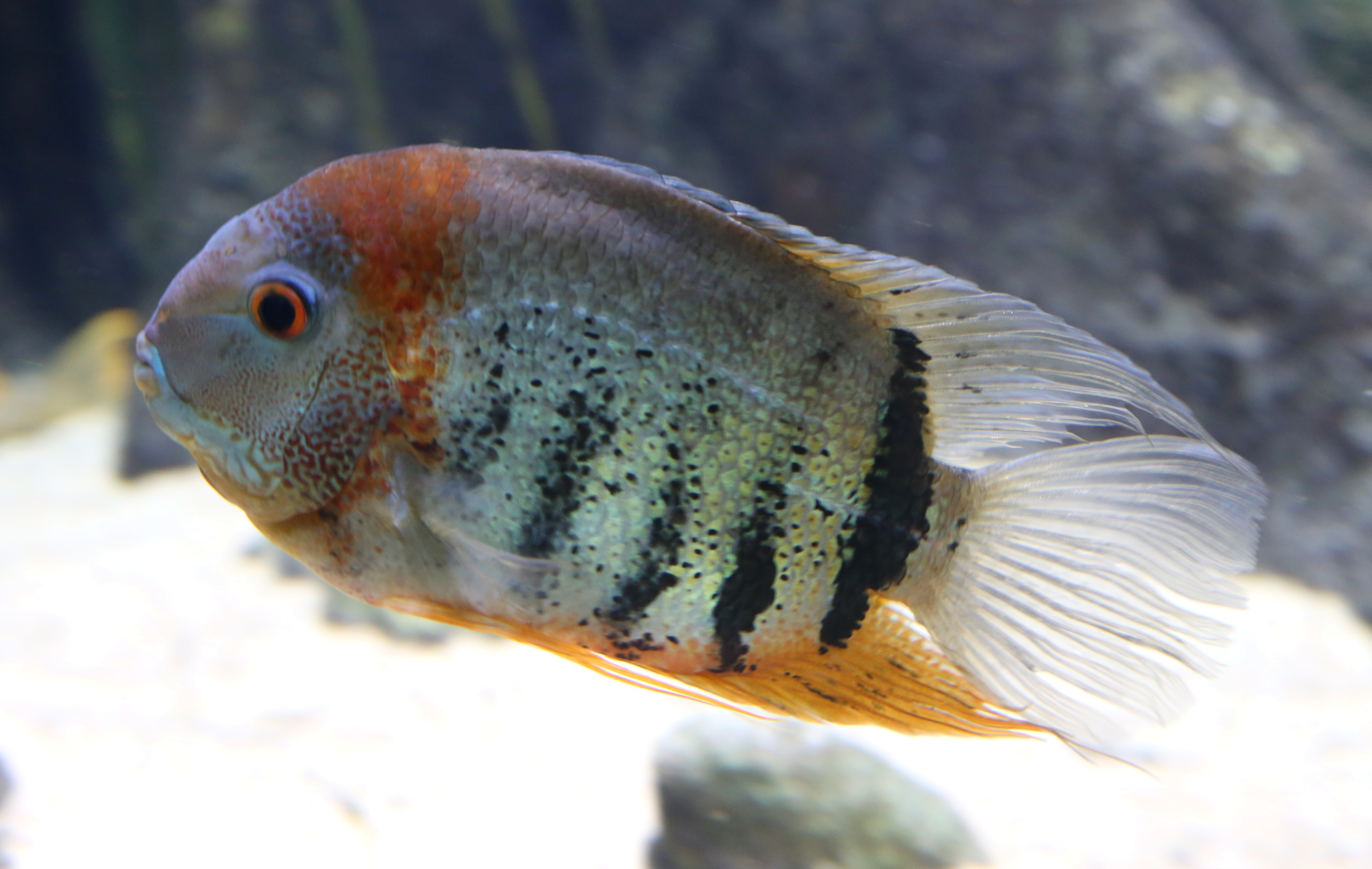
- Heros sp. Rotkeil

Scientific classification
- Domain: Eukaryota
- Kingdom: Animalia
- Phylum: Chordata
- Class: Actinopterygii
- Order: Cichliformes
- Family: Cichlidae
- Tribe: Heroini
- Genus: Heros; Heckel, 1840

Type species
- Heros severus Heckel, 1840

= Heros (fish) =

Genus of fishes

Heros is a genus of cichlids native to the Amazon, Orinoco and Essequibo River basins in South America. They were previously included in the genus Cichlasoma before its restriction to the distinct group of "Port Cichlids."

The Heros species most commonly encountered in the aquarium trade are fish referable to the species Heros efasciatus. However, the trade name generally used is "Severum Cichlids." Trade fish are very often line bred specimens of color sports such as "Super Red Severums" or "Gold Severums." The provenance of these is not clear, but they seem to have been derived from the base "Green Severum" form that is most closely identified with H. efasciatus.

== Species ==
There are currently five recognized species in this genus:

Image	Name	Distribution
	Heros efasciatus Heckel, 1840	Amazon basin
	Heros liberifer Staeck & I. Schindler, 2015	Orinoco basin in South America
	Heros notatus (Jardine, 1843)	Rio Negro and Essequibo River in South America
	Heros severus Heckel, 1840	upper Orinoco and upper Rio Negro basins in South America
	Heros spurius Heckel, 1840	Guaporé River drainage in the Amazon basin

Many authorities also cite a previously described species, Heros appendiculatus. It has a form quite distinct from H. efasciatus but was synonymized with H. efasciatus by Dr. Sven O. Kullander. Another color form, Heros sp. Rotkeil ("Red Shoulder") is thought by hobby specialists to represent an undescribed Heros species.
