= Beargrass Creek State Nature Preserve =

Nature preserve in Kentucky, United States

- Location within Kentucky
- Location: Louisville, Kentucky, United States
- Coordinates: 38.2095°N 85.7111°W
- Area: 41 acres (17 ha)
- Established: February 17, 1982
- Governing body: Kentucky State Nature Preserves Commission

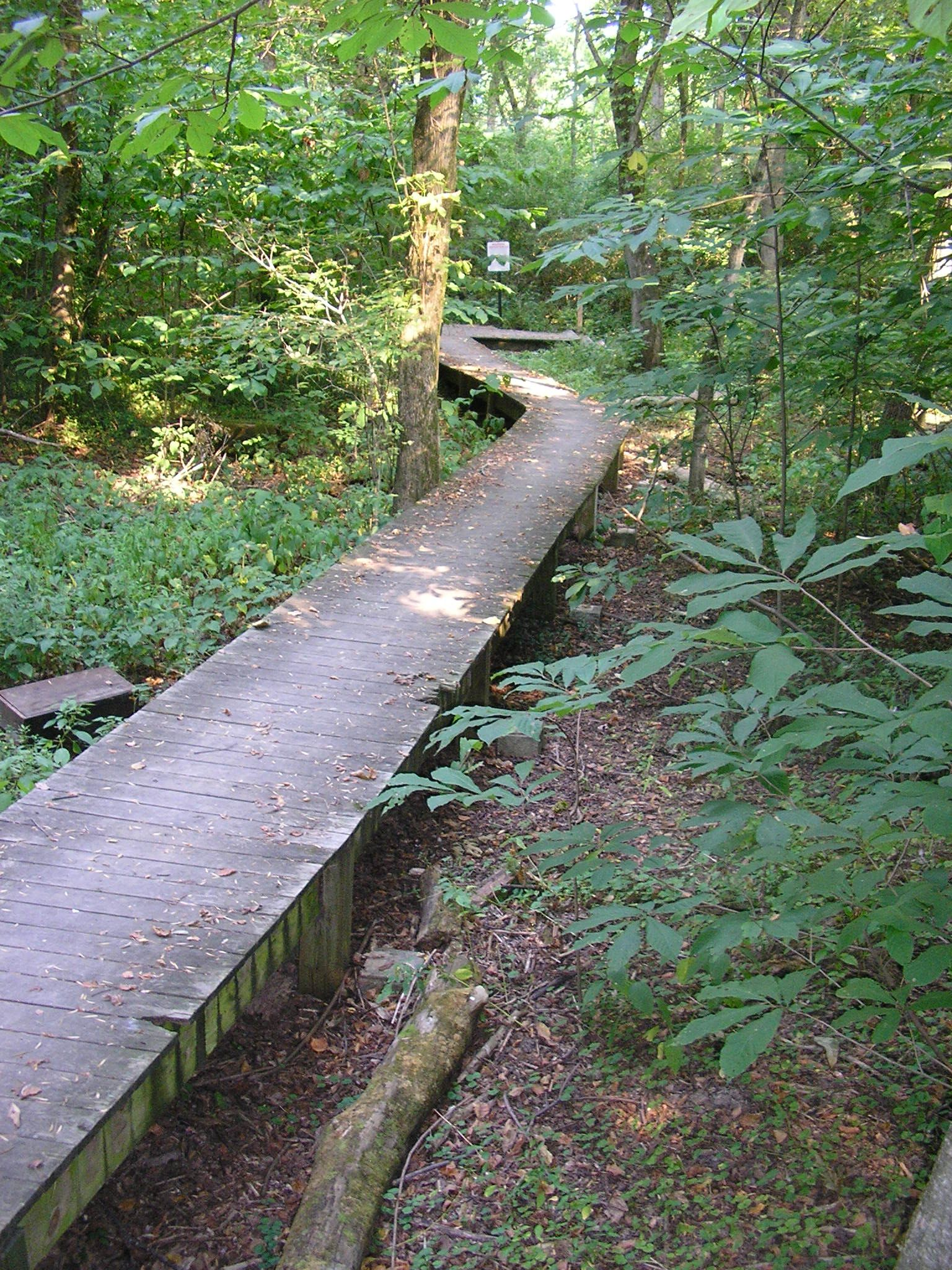
Footbridge over seasonal wetlands in the nature preserve

Beargrass Creek State Nature Preserve is a 41-acre (17 ha) nature preserve located in Louisville, Kentucky's Poplar Level neighborhood, in roughly the central portion of the city. It is named for Beargrass Creek, the south fork of which passes along the northern side of the preserve.

== Location ==
The preserve is adjacent to Louisville's Joe Creason Park and the Louisville Nature Center. It is owned by the Office of Kentucky Nature Preserves and the LNC assists with management.

== Trails ==
The preserve includes 2 miles (3.2 km) of walking trails, which cross wetlands and a ridge top. There are also 180 species of trees, shrubs and wildflowers. Over 150 species of birds have been spotted there. It is managed by the Louisville Nature Center, which is located on the west side of the preserve in a building which opened in 1997. The center claims it is "one of the largest inner-city nature preserves" in the United States.

As well as the walkable trails, there is a boardwalk that leads to a platform where individuals can listen in to an educational podcast on the preserve.

== History ==
In 1982, the State Nature Preserves Commission purchased a 41-acre (17 ha) wooded tract that became the preserve. It was a part of the Collings estate (which became Joe Creason Park) that had been acquired by the Archdiocese of Louisville in 1960.

== Wildlife ==
Beargrass Creek trails offer a diverse amount of plants and wildlife for people to explore. These trails give hikers the chance to explore and discover said local flora and fauna, with many wildlife viewing opportunities available as well. Native plants of Beargrass Creek State Nature Preserve include Yellowwood (Cladrastis kentukea), Kentucky coffeetree (Gymnocladus dioicus) for trees; spicebush (Lindera benzoin), and wild hydrangea (Hydrangea arborescens) for shrubs; purple coneflower (Echinacea purpurea), and shrub yellowroot (Xanthorhiza simplicissima) for wildflowers. With plants, native wildlife accompany them, with over 150 species of documented birds, and 30 recorded butterfly species.

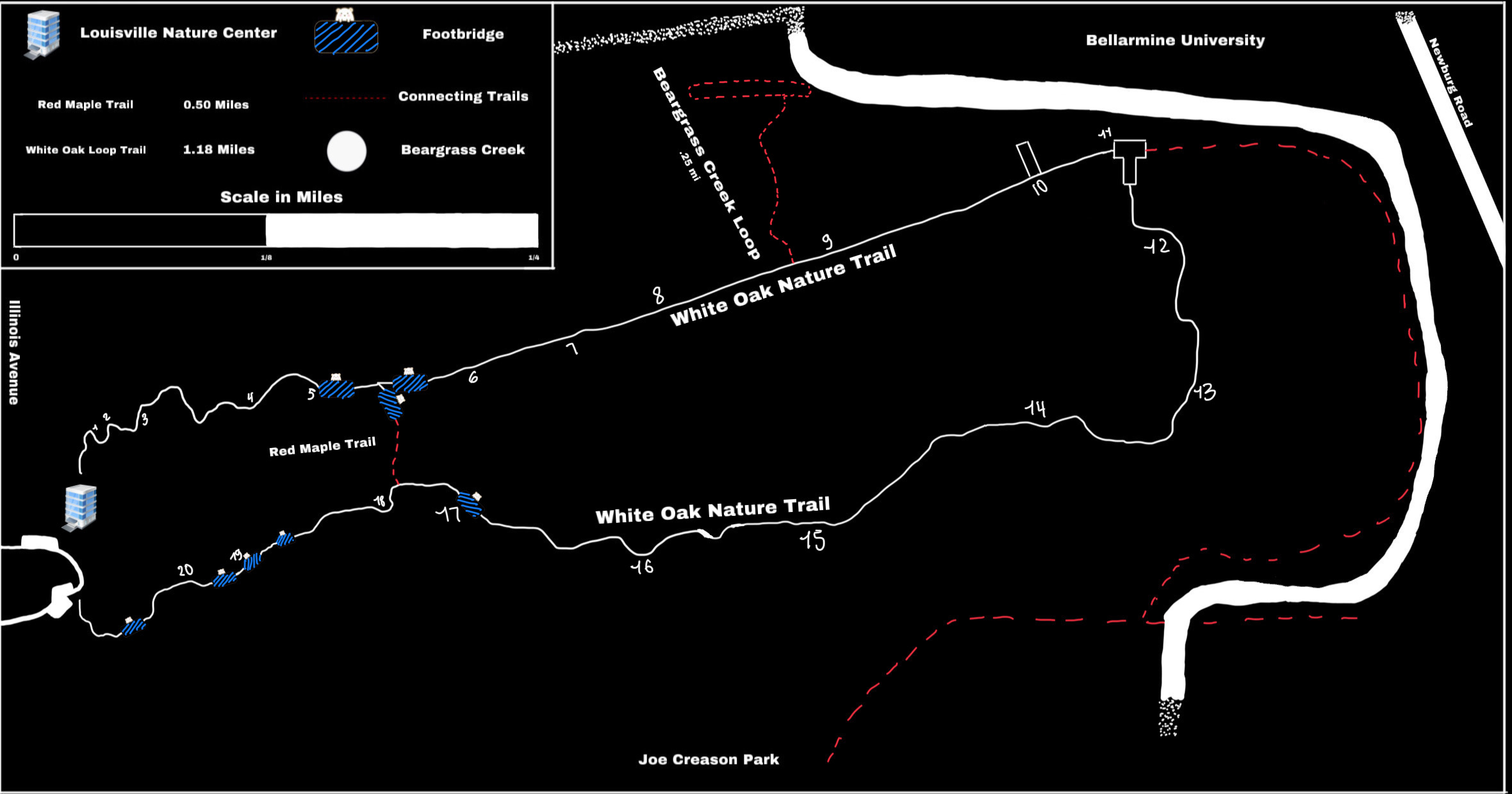
A hand-drawn map of Beargrass Creek State Nature Preserve. Not drawn to scale.

== See also ==
- List of attractions and events in the Louisville metropolitan area
