= Heros spurius =

Scientific classification
- Domain: Eukaryota
- Kingdom: Animalia
- Phylum: Chordata
- Class: Actinopterygii
- Order: Cichliformes
- Family: Cichlidae
- Genus: Heros
- Species: H. spurius

Binomial name
- Heros spurius Heckel, 1840

Synonyms
- Heros coryphaeus Heckel, 1840; Heros modestus Heckel, 1840

Species of fish

Heros spurius is a species of cichlid fish native to the Guaporé River drainage in the Amazon basin in South America. It reaches a length up to 15 cm (6 in).
