= SubTropolis =

American underground space leasing corporation

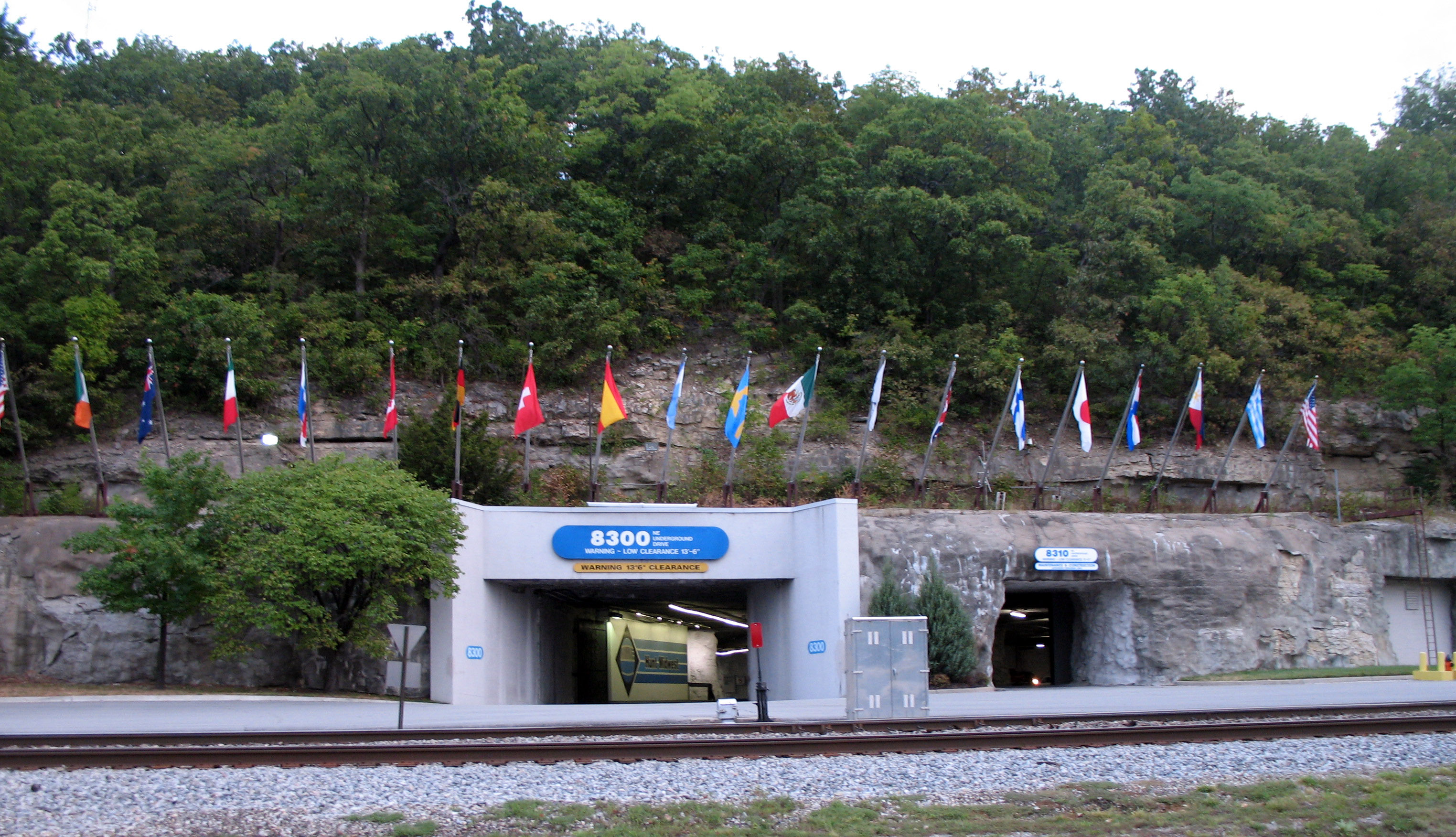
- SubTropolis
- Interactive map of SubTropolis
- Location: Kansas City, Missouri, United States
- Coordinates: 39°09′40″N 94°28′34″W

SubTropolis is a business complex located inside of a 14,000,000-square-foot (1,300,000 m^{2}) limestone mine in the bluffs north of the Missouri River in Kansas City, Missouri. It was developed by late Kansas City Chiefs owner Lamar Hunt via Hunt Midwest Real Estate Development, Inc., with the trademarked phrase World's Largest Underground Business Complex.

SubTropolis is up to 160 feet (49 m) beneath the surface, dug into the Bethany Falls limestone mine. It has a grid of 16-foot-high (4.9 m), 40-foot-wide (12 m) tunnels separated by 25-foot-square (7.6 m) limestone pillars created by the room and pillar method of hard rock mining. The complex contains almost 10.5 miles (16.9 km) of illuminated, paved roads and several miles of railroad track.

The mine naturally maintains year-round temperatures between 65 and 70 °F (18 and 21 °C). The United States Postal Service and the U.S. Environmental Protection Agency lease spaces within SubTropolis, the U.S. Postal Service for its collectible stamp operations and the Environmental Protection Agency for its Region-7 Training and Logistics Center. The National Archives and Records Administration leases space for a Federal Records Center.

On the surface of the north edge of the complex, Hunt developed the Worlds of Fun and Oceans of Fun amusement park complex. His extensive business dealings in Clay County contributed to the Chiefs establishing a training camp site at Liberty's William Jewell College from 1963 until 1991.

Other facilities exist that are similar to SubTropolis, although not on the same scale, such as the abandoned mine in Butler, Pennsylvania used by Corbis and the Federal Government for secure storage. The room and pillar mining method is used to extract limestone throughout the Midwest, and many companies are looking at ways to utilize the hundreds of millions of square feet created in this manner, such as for mushroom farming or crude oil stockpiling.

Limestone bluffs lining Cliff Drive in Kansas City, Missouri

== Origins ==
During the last Ice Age, glaciation progressing as far as Northeastern Kansas and Northern Missouri reshaped the Missouri River's path through the Northern and Central Great Plains, causing it to overtake the Kansas River as the main stem tributary of the Mississippi, and exposing substantial limestone deposits around the present-day Kansas City metropolitan area. Its presence led to the development of expansive quarrying operations from the mid-20th century onward.

Sideways tunneling into the hills surrounding Kansas City created an expansive network of underground chambers accessible at ground level between 12 and 15 feet in height, supported by pillars more than 24 feet wide. Demand for freezing and refrigeration infrastructure in the 1950s and 60s led to the development of storage facilities in emptied limestone mines, making Kansas City a "central location for cold storage" during that period.

== History ==
SubTropolis was developed from limestone mines that supported Kansas City's construction and material industry in the late 19th and early 20th centuries. The site that now comprises SubTropolis began in 1945 as a lateral mining operation east of present-day I-435 in Clay County, Missouri by Midwest Precote, a regional asphalt producer. As mining activity decreased, the site was repurposed by Lamar Hunt, then-owner of the Dallas Texans and principal founder of the American Football League, Major League Soccer, and the Kansas City Chiefs. Hunt would become a chief investor in the Great Midwest Corporation, which purchased Midwest Precote in 1970 to develop emptied mining sites for commercial use.

The first underground complex developed by the now-Hunt Midwest company opened for commercial use in 1964, utilizing the tunnels for good and equipment storage. The first tenant was a local construction company, which leased storage space for heavy machinery. Early tenants included Pillsbury and Russell Stover Candies. In the early 1970s, the Ford Motor Company leased 25 acres of the facility to store vehicle inventory. In 1973, the Worlds of Fun amusement park was opened on a 300-acre site above the underground complex, receiving an expansion in 1982. 3 million square feet of commercial space had been developed by 1983, according to the company.

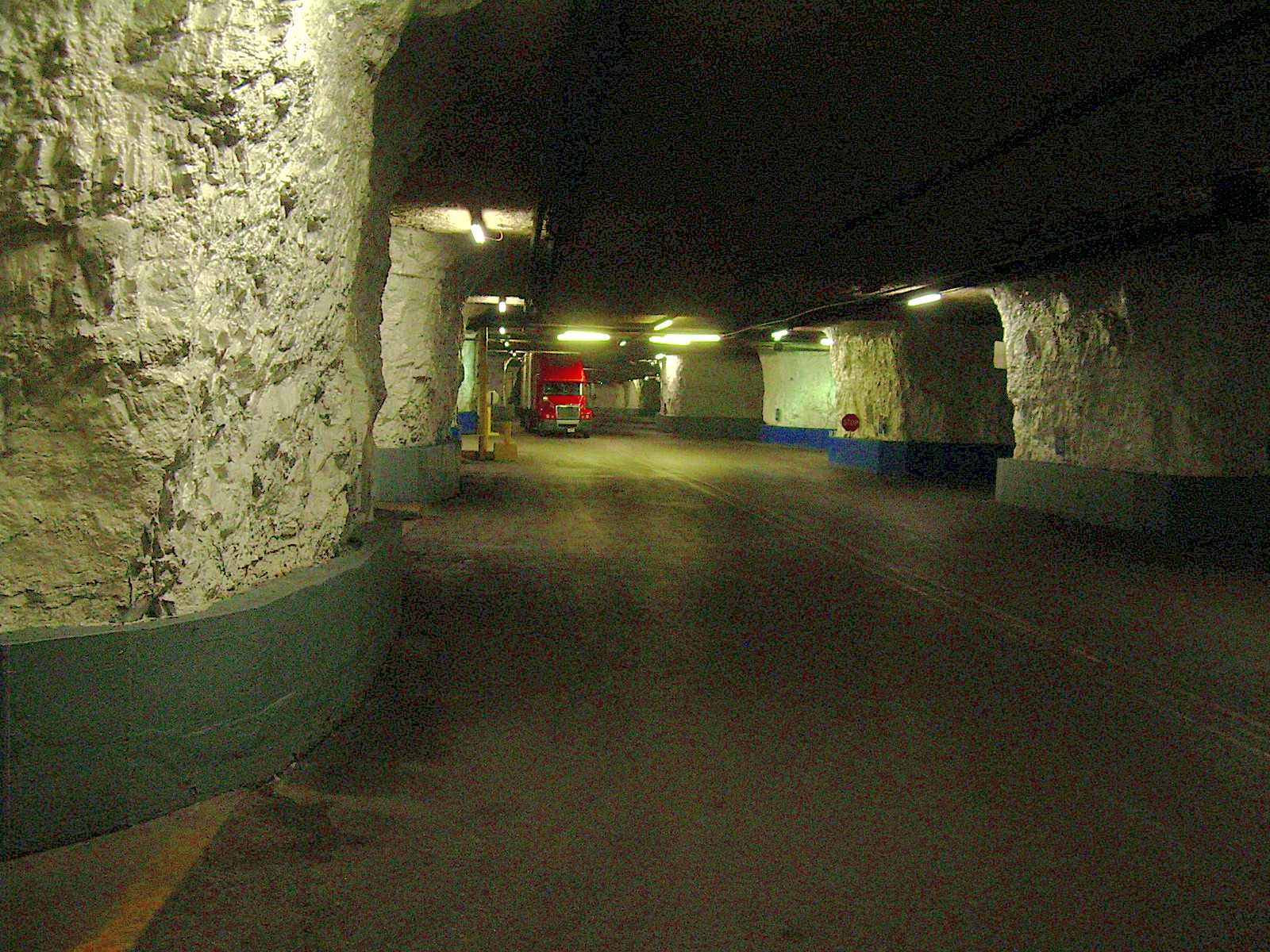
The interior of SubTropolis

In 1985, Hunt Midwest Enterprises was formed from the merger of Great Midwest Corporation and Mid-America Enterprises, creating three subsidiaries, among them Hunt Midwest Mining, Inc., and Hunt Midwest Real Estate Development, Inc, which would come to handle the operation of SubTropolis's commercial holdings. The company sold Worlds of Fun and its expansion Oceans of Fun to Cedar Fair Entertainment Company in 1995, becoming a partial owner, and seating then-president and CEO Lee Derrough on its board.

In the fall of 2001, 50 employees at a postal facility in the complex were tested for anthrax after handling mail from a distribution center in Brentwood, Washington D.C., where numerous individuals had been exposed to the virus, and 2 had died. The workers were administered a course of antibiotics as a precaution, though no infection arose, and all further tests for the virus in facilities were negative.

== Operations ==
SubTropolis is home to key archival facilities for various U.S. government agencies, businesses, and non-profit organizations. Among them are a distributor of last resort for major American film studios, a NARA federal records center, a United States Postal Service storage facility which houses and distributes copies of every stamp ever produced, and a W. W. Grainger facility set to be the world's largest underground distribution center upon its completion in the summer of 2026.

=== Layout ===
SubTropolis is laid out in a grid pattern, with thousands of pillars spaced 40 feet apart dividing six miles of roadway and two miles of rail. Facilities are numbered by pillar, and most streets are named for geologic layers of limestone or shale. Roughly a tenth of SubTropolis is designated for commercial use, with mining operations continuing on the far edges of Hunt Midwest's holdings. It and other tunnel operators' caverns account for roughly 10% of all industrial space in the Kansas City metro area, totaling roughly 25 million square feet. This results in Kansas City having among the highest rates of mined-out cavern reusage in the world, and 90% of the world's subsurface office space as of 2010.

=== Financials and worker experience ===
The company started with roughly 4 million square feet of mined-out space, growing to encompass a roughly 14 million square foot complex by present day. Around the turn of the 21st century, roughly 4.3 million square feet of industrial and commercial space was being leased to 50 tenants, employing approximately 1,300 people. By 2010, there were 55 tenants. By 2024, the number employed in SubTropolis exceeded 2,000, with leased space exceeding 6 million square feet.

Distance from the surface and a reliance on above-ground ventilation pose unique challenges to public life in a facility host to a diverse set of business and industrial operations. AM-FM radio signals cannot reach the complex, effectively cutting off workers' connection to the outside world unless companies elect to install receivers above-ground. Truck idling is prohibited within the facility to prevent the buildup of toxic fumes.

=== Sustainability ===
SubTropolis has been noted by several publications for its contributions towards sustainable industry in the Kansas City area, and held up as a potential model for other communities facing rising temperatures and increasing energy costs amid a changing climate. Leasing and operating costs are reported to be substantially lower than above-ground facilities, particularly temperature control, costs for which can be diminished by as much as 85%. Hunt Midwest purports the complex to possess the largest green roof in the world.

== See also ==
- Mega Cavern, a similar and smaller cavern in Louisville, Kentucky
