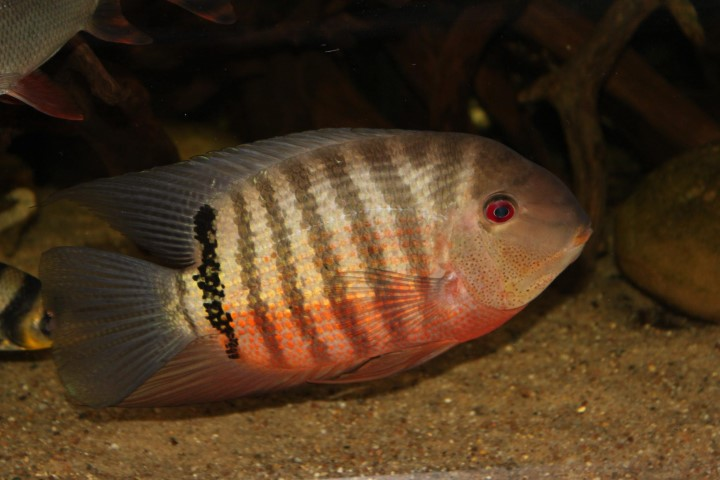

Scientific classification
- Kingdom: Animalia
- Phylum: Chordata
- Class: Actinopterygii
- Order: Cichliformes
- Family: Cichlidae
- Genus: Heros
- Species: H. liberifer

Binomial name
- Heros liberifer Staeck & I. Schindler, 2015

= Heros liberifer =

Species of fish

Heros liberifer is a species of tropical cichlid endemic to lentic habitats, especially flooded forests, in the upper and middle Orinoco basin in Venezuela.

Up until 2014 the liberifer was incorrectly believed to be the previously defined H. severus that was defined in 1840 by Heckel[cite]. Heros severus can be differentiated by having a partially formed band unlike other Heros as well as having a red shoulders. This band was originally defined by Heckel however it was dismissed as an anomaly by Kullander(1986) in the collected species. With the finding of the true H. severum, Staek & Shindler officially classified the liberifer so as to make room for the true H. severus.

== Description ==
H. liberifer can be distinguished from other Heros species due to its small spots that form horizontal lines across the lower half of its body. Other traits of the liberifer are a caudal spot in adult specimen as well as, generally narrower lips than other species.

== Aquarium trade ==
This species is uncommon in the aquarium trade.

The species generally found in the aquarium trade Heros efasciatus and its man-made color morphs(red and gold) as well as the unspecified H. sp.'rotkeil'.
