= Louisville Zoo =

Zoo in Louisville, Kentucky, United States

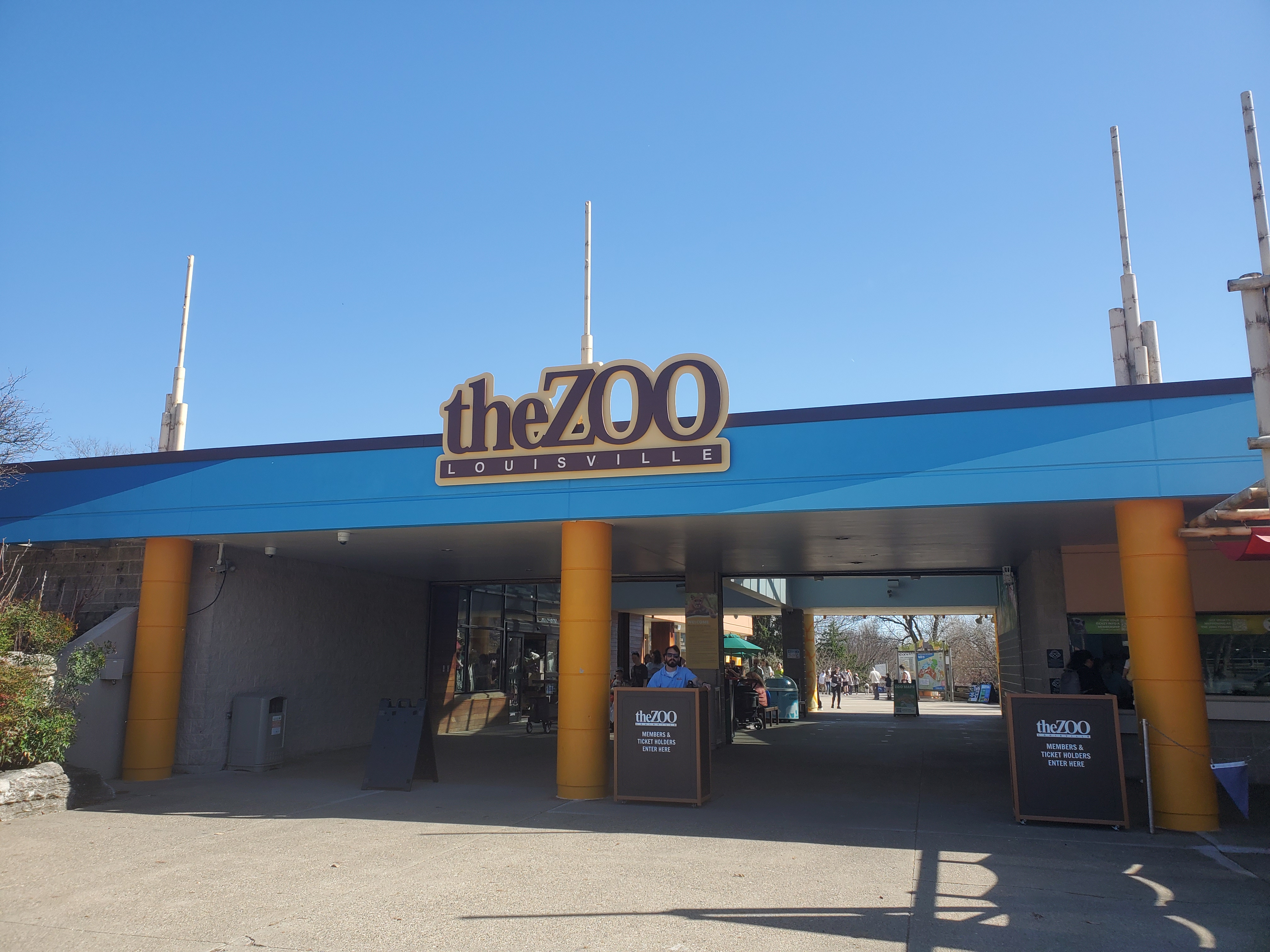
- Zoo entrance
- Interactive map of Louisville Zoo
- 38°12′19″N 85°42′19″W
- Date opened: May 1, 1969; 57 years ago
- Location: Louisville, Kentucky, United States
- Land area: 134 acres (54 ha)
- No. of animals: 1,700
- Annual visitors: 900,000+
- Memberships: Association of Zoos and Aquariums
- Major exhibits: The Islands, Africa, Glacier Run, Australia, South America, HerpAquarium, Gorilla Forest, Cats of the Americas
- Public transit: TARC
- Website: louisvillezoo.org

The Louisville Zoological Gardens, commonly known as the Louisville Zoo, is a 134-acre (54 ha) zoo in Louisville, Kentucky, situated in the city's Poplar Level neighborhood. Founded in 1969, the "State Zoo of Kentucky" currently exhibits over 1,200 animals in naturalistic and mixed animal settings representing both geographical areas and biomes or habitats.

The Louisville Zoo is accredited by the Association of Zoos and Aquariums. Throughout the 2010s, the zoo had annual attendance anywhere from 760,000 to 945,000 visitors.

== History ==
The Louisville Zoo opened on May 1, 1969, with 250 animals on exhibit. The zoo was built on land acquired by the City of Louisville in the 1960s from the estate of Ben Collins. Much of the initial funding was donated by local philanthropist James Graham Brown.

Opening Day in 1969 mostly had exhibits with four-legged animals such as elephants and giraffes. The zoo also offered a train to take zoo visitors past several exhibits; this attraction operated until 2019, and the trains were ultimately sold in 2021. Opening Day had some criticism from the general public as a lack of shade was evident throughout the zoo. Over time, tree growth has reduced the problem.

In 1997, a fully restored Philadelphia Toboggan Company (PTC #49) carousel was added as an attraction. In May 2007, Glacier Run Splash Park, a children's water playground with 42 water-spray features, opened at the zoo. The splash park was the first phase of the Glacier Run area to open, which features polar bear exhibits modeled after the town of Churchill, Manitoba, Canada. The Splash Park closed in 2022 due to reconstruction of the drainage mat and reopened in April 2023.

== Exhibits ==
The Louisville Zoo has eight large exhibits: The Islands, Africa, Glacier Run, Australia, South America, HerpAquarium, Gorilla Forest, and the Cats of the Americas exhibit.

=== Gorilla Forest ===
The zoo was awarded the 2003 Association of Zoos and Aquariums Exhibit Award for its 4-acre (16,000 m^{2}) exhibit "Gorilla Forest". The exhibit currently houses a troop of nine western lowland gorillas, and two pygmy hippopotamuses. Inside the circular Gorilla Sanctuary, visitors are separated only by glass and can interact with the gorillas.

Several different outdoor vantage points are available from which to see the gorillas playing and relaxing. In October 2022, one female gorilla named Helen died, and at the time of her death, she was the second-oldest gorilla in history, being born in Cameroon in 1958. She was also known as the "Grand Dame" of the gorilla world.

=== HerpAquarium ===
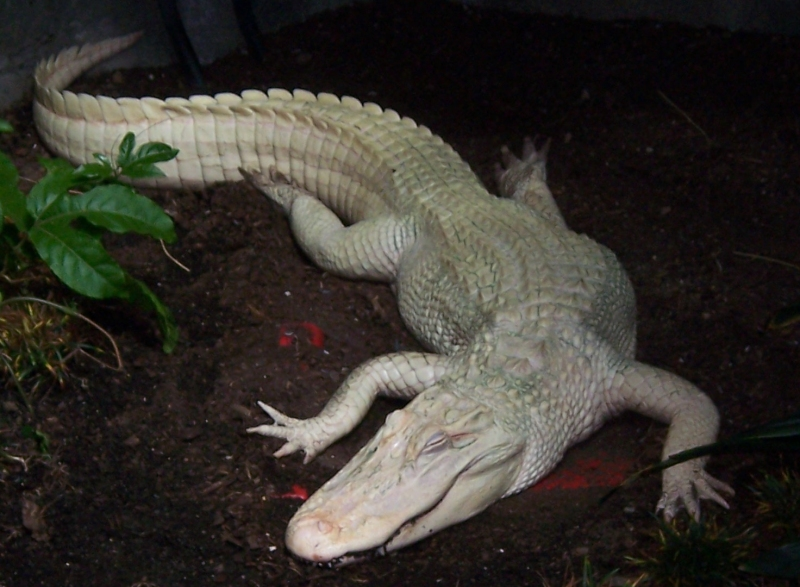
King Louie, the albino alligator

The HerpAquarium features over 100 species of reptiles, amphibians, and fish, from around the world including Gila monsters, panther chameleons, and black piranhas. A notable resident of the HerpAquarium is a 9.5-foot-long (2.9 m) rare male albino American alligator named King Louie. He is named after King Louis XVI of France, after whom the city of Louisville is also named. Louie was hatched at the St. Augustine Alligator Farm Zoological Park.

On March 31, 2006, the zoo added a group of seven common vampire bats obtained from the Philadelphia Zoo, and another ten from the Sedgwick County Zoo were added to the group in late May 2006. Eventually, the exhibit will house around 40 bats. The exhibit is designed to look like an old mine shaft.

=== Islands ===
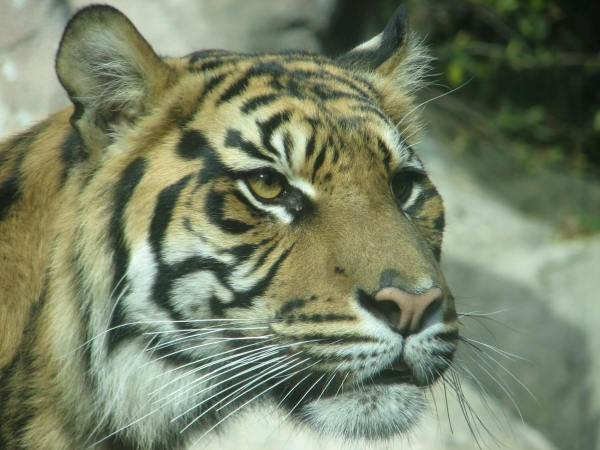
Sumatran tiger

The zoo has a zoological exhibit called "Islands", which rotates a variety of animals into one exhibit space; this way the animals can explore different habitats throughout the day, as they would in the wild. This helps to give the animals needed stimulation and heightens their awareness. Moreover, the exhibit has natural predator and prey in the same space and has three outdoor exhibit areas and one indoor area. All animals in this exhibit are endangered or threatened species. The animals on display here change from day to day so that visitors can have a new and different experience with each visit to the zoo. The animals that can be seen in this exhibit include Sumatran tigers, orangutans, siamangs, North Sulawesi babirusas, Malayan tapirs, Aldabra giant tortoises, and little penguins.

The zoo is home to five orangutans, a male named Segundo, and four females named Amber, Bella, Sumagu and Kera. Amber is known as a social media star, particularly on TikTok, where videos of her pointing and ask zoo guests to show her things have gone viral. Amber is a hybrid orangutan, while Segundo, Bella, Sumagu and Kera are Sumatran orangutans.

The Islands Pavilion is an indoor area that houses many species of birds. The zoo was the first zoo in the world to hatch the rare white-throated ground-dove in captivity. The first hatchling was born on October 17, 2006, and a second followed on December 1, 2006. Some of the other bird species included in the Islands Pavilion are Victoria crowned pigeons, Nicobar pigeons, pied imperial pigeons, Jambu fruit doves, wompoo fruit doves, Asian fairy-bluebirds, red-crested cardinals, Indian white-eyes, Oriental storks, Hyacinth Macaws, African penguins and Inca terns. The pavilion also houses Rodrigues fruit bats, Binturongs, Cuban crocodiles, and Komodo dragons.

=== Wallaroo Walkabout ===
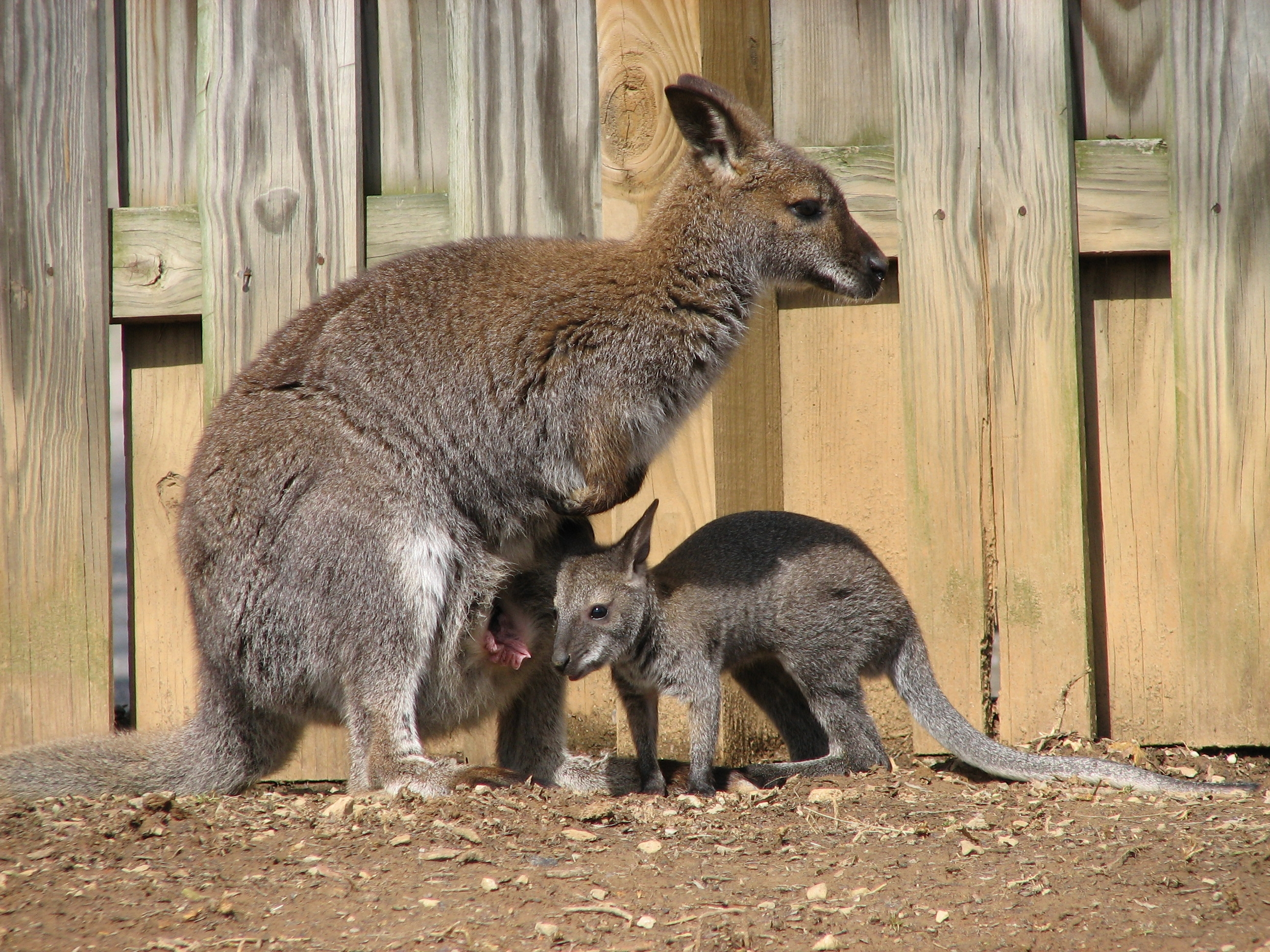
Red-necked wallaby

The Wallaroo Walkabout that opened in 2007 lets guests walk directly through the exhibit, which is home to common wallaroos and red-necked wallabies, as well as Australian birds including the emu, laughing kookaburra, Tawny frogmouth and Southern Cassowary. Visitors are able to interact with the wallaroos and wallabies if they stay on the walkway. Then after the wallabies and wallaroos, guests can go into the Lorikeet Landing, which is an Australian exhibit that is a walkthrough aviary filled with several brightly colored birds known as lorikeets. Currently, the zoo houses 56 lorikeets in a mixed flock consisting of five species of bird. Visitors can feed nectar to the birds right out of their hands.

=== Glacier Run ===
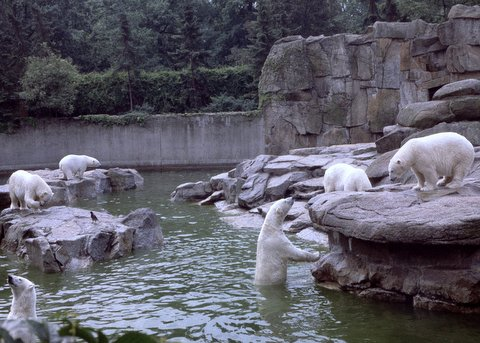
Polar bears (Ursus maritimus)

Finished in early 2011, this 4.3-acre (1.7 ha) outdoor exhibit is based on the theme of an old gold-mining town bordered by a glacier, and features polar bears, harbor seals, grey seals, California sea lions, grizzly bears, and Steller's sea eagles. Outside the gold mine town are two exhibits for snow leopards and Siberian tigers. The exhibit also has a splash park for children that opened in 2007, and was the first part of this $25 million exhibit to open.

The exhibit also includes classrooms, party rooms available for rental, viewing areas above and below water, and a 200-seat outdoor auditorium for watching animal training demonstrations. A Steller's sea eagle named Pytr is housed in his own aviary set behind the sea lion amphitheater going 50 ft vertically. Alongside Pytr, the aviary houses Azure-winged magpie, baer's pochard, and red-breasted goose in a small walk through enclosure.

In 2025, the zoo received two koalas from the San Diego Zoo.

=== Africa ===
This region of the zoo is based on the African Serengeti. The animals featured here include African lions, dromedary camels, southern white rhinoceroses, common warthogs, addaxes, meerkats, naked mole-rats, Hartmann's mountain zebras, Masai giraffes, wattled cranes, eastern bongos, a boma petting yard for Nigerian Dwarf goats, ring-tailed lemurs, and colobus monkeys.

The Louisville Zoo was one of the last remaining zoos to exhibit African and Asian elephants together in the same habitat, which they did up until 2025, when they were moved to The Elephant Sanctuary in Tennessee. The zoo was home to a female Asian elephant named Punch, who was born in 1970, and a female African bush elephant named Mikki, who was born in 1985.

=== Cats of the Americas ===
This part of the zoo is next to the South America exhibit, and it has all rescued animals that cannot be returned to the wild. The animals include the Canada lynxes, bald eagles, and cougars.

=== South America ===
This exhibit of the zoo has animals from the Andes grasslands and Amazon rainforest of South America along with a botanical garden area. The animals in this exhibit include Chilean flamingos, maned wolves, Linnaeus's two-toed sloths, red-crowned cranes, red pandas, and toco toucans.

=== Kentucky Trails ===
A roughly $30 million Upland South Safari known as Kentucky Trails, built over roughly 20 acres in an under-developed portion of the property, will be dedicated to animals from North America. Kentucky Trails is being built in partnership with Kentucky Fish and Wildlife to house and exhibit native animals from the Appalachian and Cumberland Gap regions. Notable enclosers include two rotational Great Plains inspired woodlands that will house American bison, elk, American black bears, bobcats and other native animals. A large Rickhouse Hall inspired education center and restaurant is also to be built.

List of animals

Mammals

Western lowland gorilla	Black-and-white colobus	Chinchilla	Domestic ferret
Orangutan	Siamang	African lion	Cougar
Red panda	Canada lynx	Siberian tiger	Grizzly bear
Addax	Hartmann's mountain zebra	Linnaeus's two-toed sloth	Koala
Masai giraffe	Common woolly monkey	Polar bear	Babirusa
Bongo	Rodrigues fruit bat	Vampire bat	Dromedary camel
Domestic rabbit	Black-footed ferret	Four-toed hedgehog	Binturong
Pygmy hippopotamus	African pygmy goat	Meerkat	Naked mole-rat
Virginia opossum	White rhinoceros	Nigerian Dwarf goat	Grey seal
California sea lion	Malayan tapir	Sumatran tiger	Wallaroo
Red-necked wallaby	Warthog	Maned wolf	Three-banded Armadillo
Harbor seal	Ring-tailed lemur	Snow leopard	American beaver

Reptiles and Amphibians

Leaf-tailed Gecko	Bearded dragon	Boa constrictor	Rosy boa
Panther chameleon	Cuban crocodile	Poison dart frog	Argentine tegu
Gila monster	Komodo dragon	American alligator	Andean milksnake
Ball python	Reticulated python	Timber rattlesnake	Blue-tongued skink
Corn snake	Eastern indigo snake	Western hognose snake	Aldabra giant tortoise
Greek tortoise	Star tortoise	Gaboon viper	Grey tree frog
American toad	Sonoran desert toad	African bullfrog	Puerto Rican crested toad
Banded Egyptian cobra	Green tree python	Iranian fat-tailed gecko	Emerald tree boa
Desert sidewinder	Cottonmouth	Copperhead	Red-tailed green ratsnake
Angolan python	Rough scaled sand boa	Eastern diamondback rattlesnake	Black kingsnake
Schneider's skink	Sandfish	New Caledonian giant gecko	Sheltopusik
Pygmy spiny tailed skink	Asian box turtle	Diamondback terrapin	Eastern box turtle
Hellbender	Alligator snapping turtle	Surinam horned frog	California kingsnake
Rock rattlesnake	Tiger rattlesnake	Pueblan milk snake	Black rattlesnake
Black-tailed rattlesnake	Spotted turtle		

Birds

Mariana fruit dove	Pink-headed fruit dove	White-throated ground-dove	Wompoo fruit-dove
Jambu fruit-dove	Beautiful fruit-dove	Caribbean dove	Curl-crested aracari
White-crowned pigeon	Papuan mountain-pigeon	Nicobar pigeon	Pied imperial-pigeon
Cinnamon ground-dove	Black swan	Red-crowned crane	Golden-breasted starling
Wattled crane	East African crowned crane	Steller's sea eagle	Bald eagle
Hawaiian hawk	African penguin	Oriental stork	White stork
Saffron finch	Sandhill crane	Madagascar crested ibis	Green naped rainbow lorikeet
Sunbittern	Red-breasted goose	Chilean flamingo	Blue-gray tanager
Bay-headed tanager	Emu	Bali starling	Masked laughingthrush
Inca tern	Red-crested cardinal	Madagascar fody	Blue-winged leafbird
Dalmatian pelican	Yellow-hooded blackbird	Warbling white-eye	Golden white-eye
Crested wood-partridge	Mandarin duck	Hyacinth macaw	Emerald starling
Yellow-breasted ground dove	White-crested laughingthrush	Tawny frogmouth	Chestnut teal
Turkey vulture	Little penguin	Baer's pochard	Southern screamer
Waldrapp ibis	Kookaburra	Bridled white-eye	Geen-naped pheasant pigeon
Victoria crowned pigeon	Red-billed leiothrix	Swainson's lorikeet	Red lory
Oriental white-eye	Red-tailed hawk	Peregrine falcon	Victoria crowned pigeon
Southern cassowary

Fish

Green severum	Silver arowana	Redhook metunnis	Banded archer fish
Banded lepornus	Black piranha	African moony	Dolphin catfish

Arthropods

Blue bloom birdeater	Texas brown tarantula	Venezuelan suntiger tarantula
Salem ornamental tarantula	King baboon spider	Mexican redknee tarantula
Chilean rose tarantula	Mexican fireleg tarantula	Brazilian salmon pink

== Gallery ==
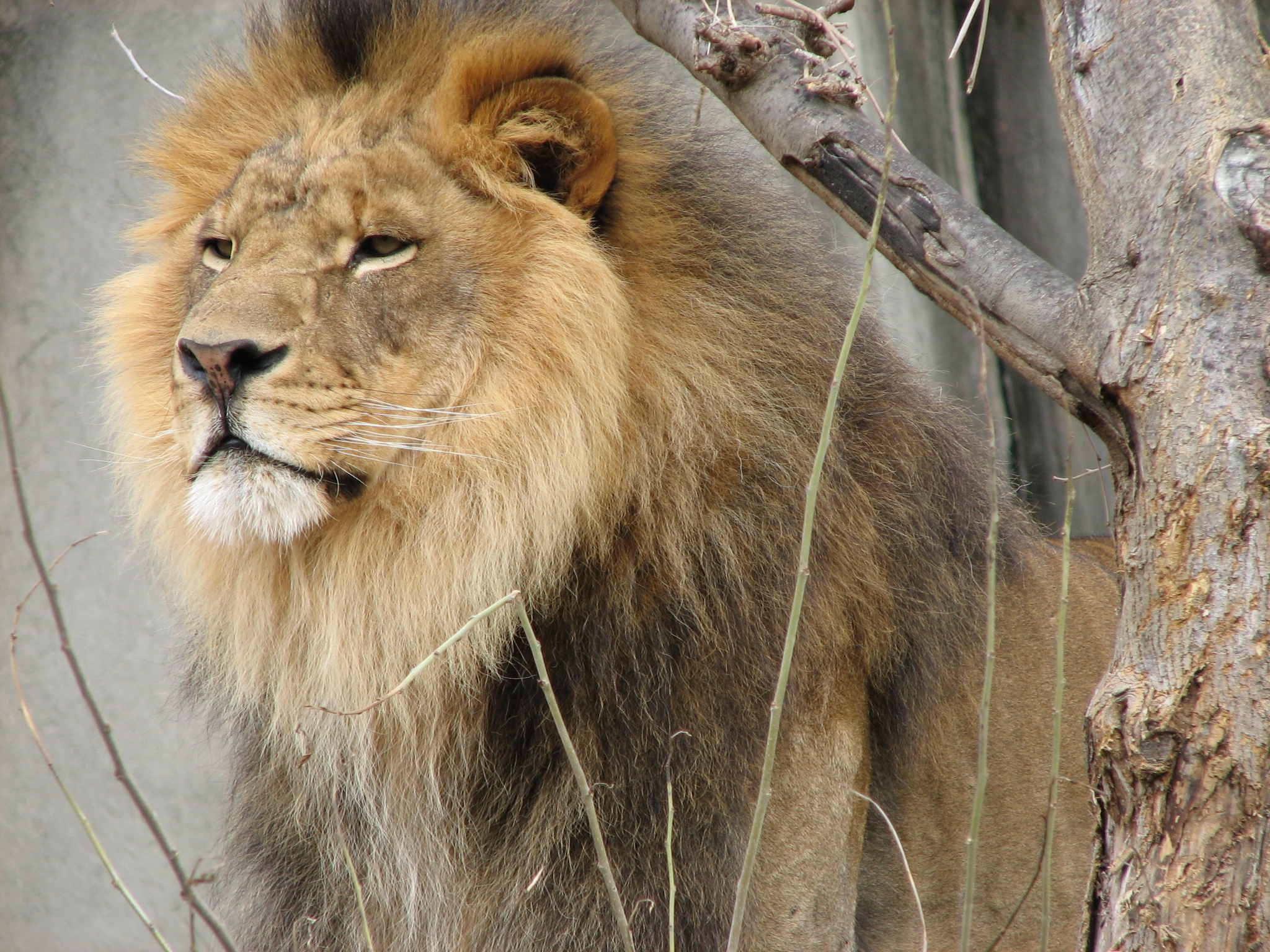
African lion

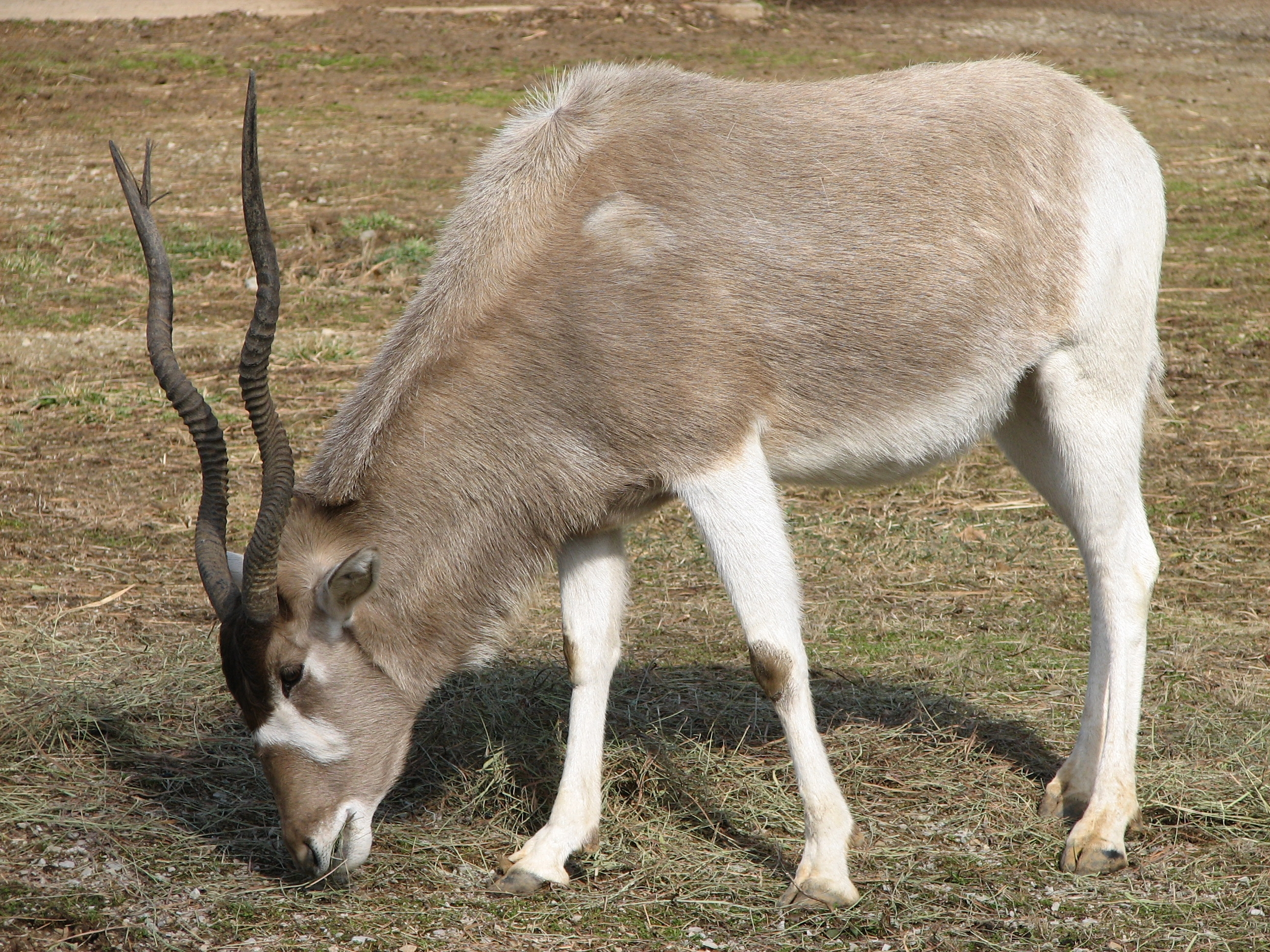
Addax

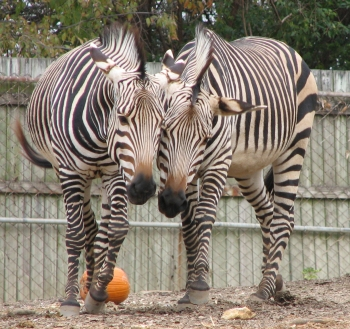
Hartmann's mountain zebra

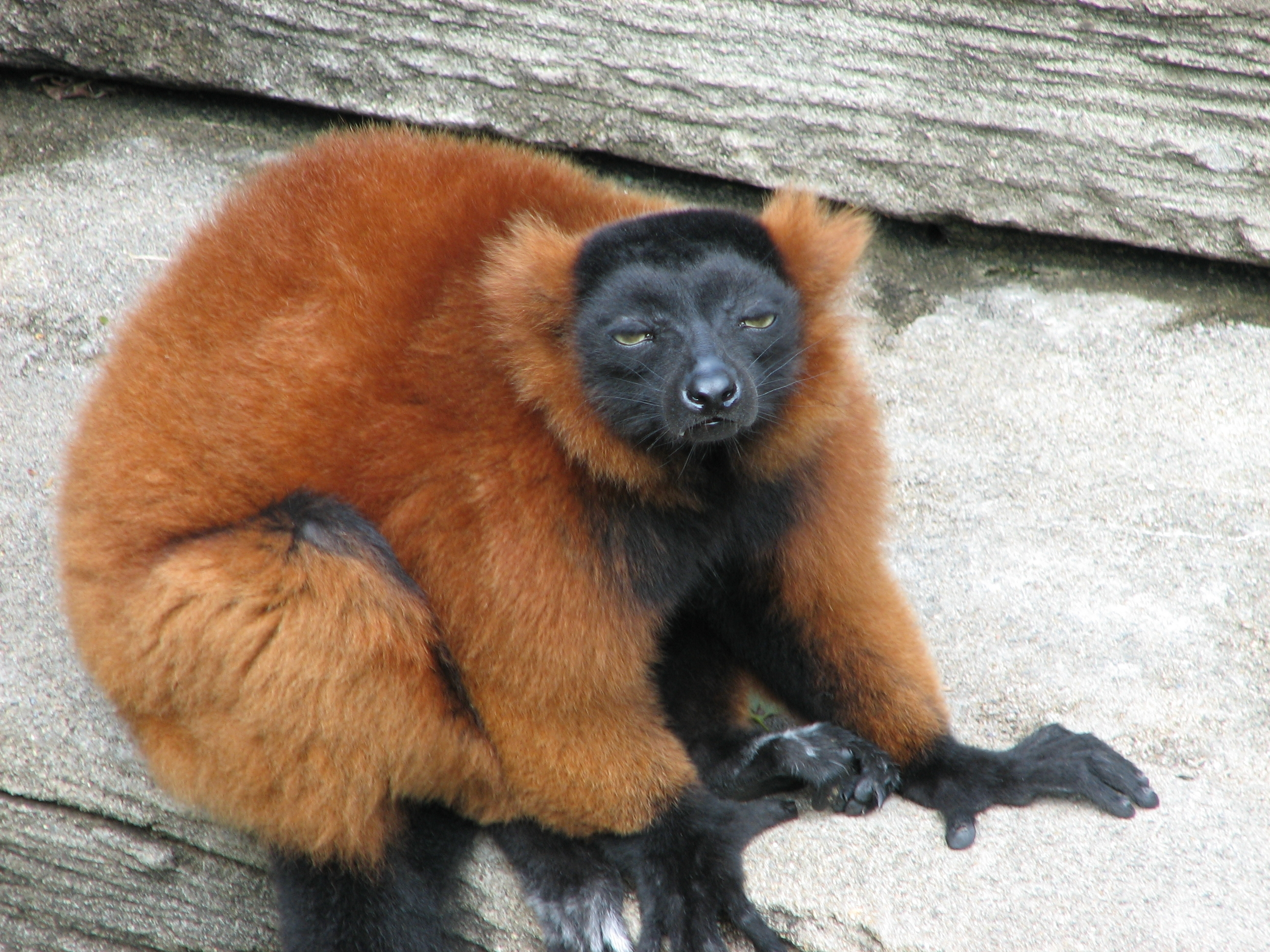
Red ruffed lemur

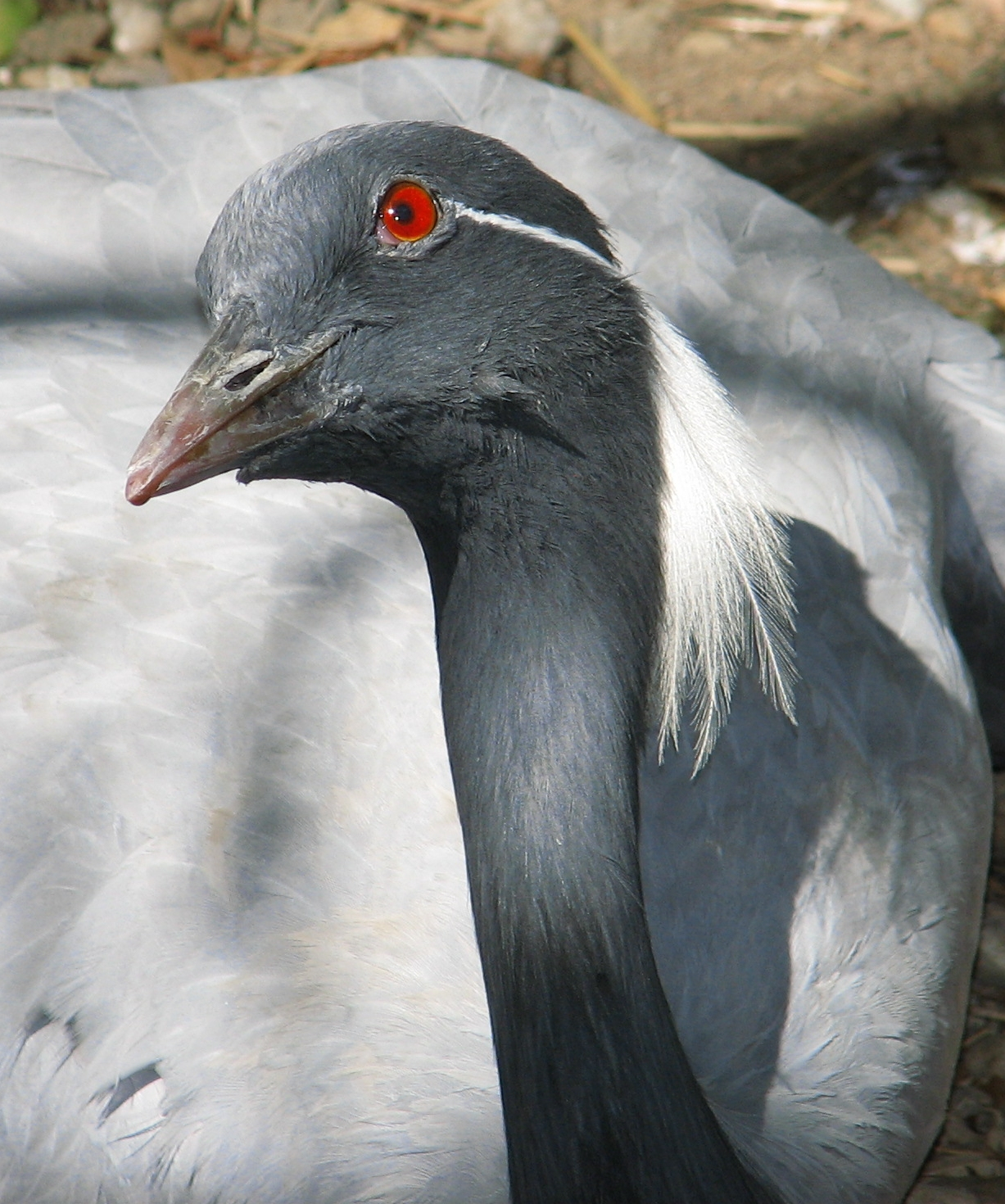
Demoiselle crane

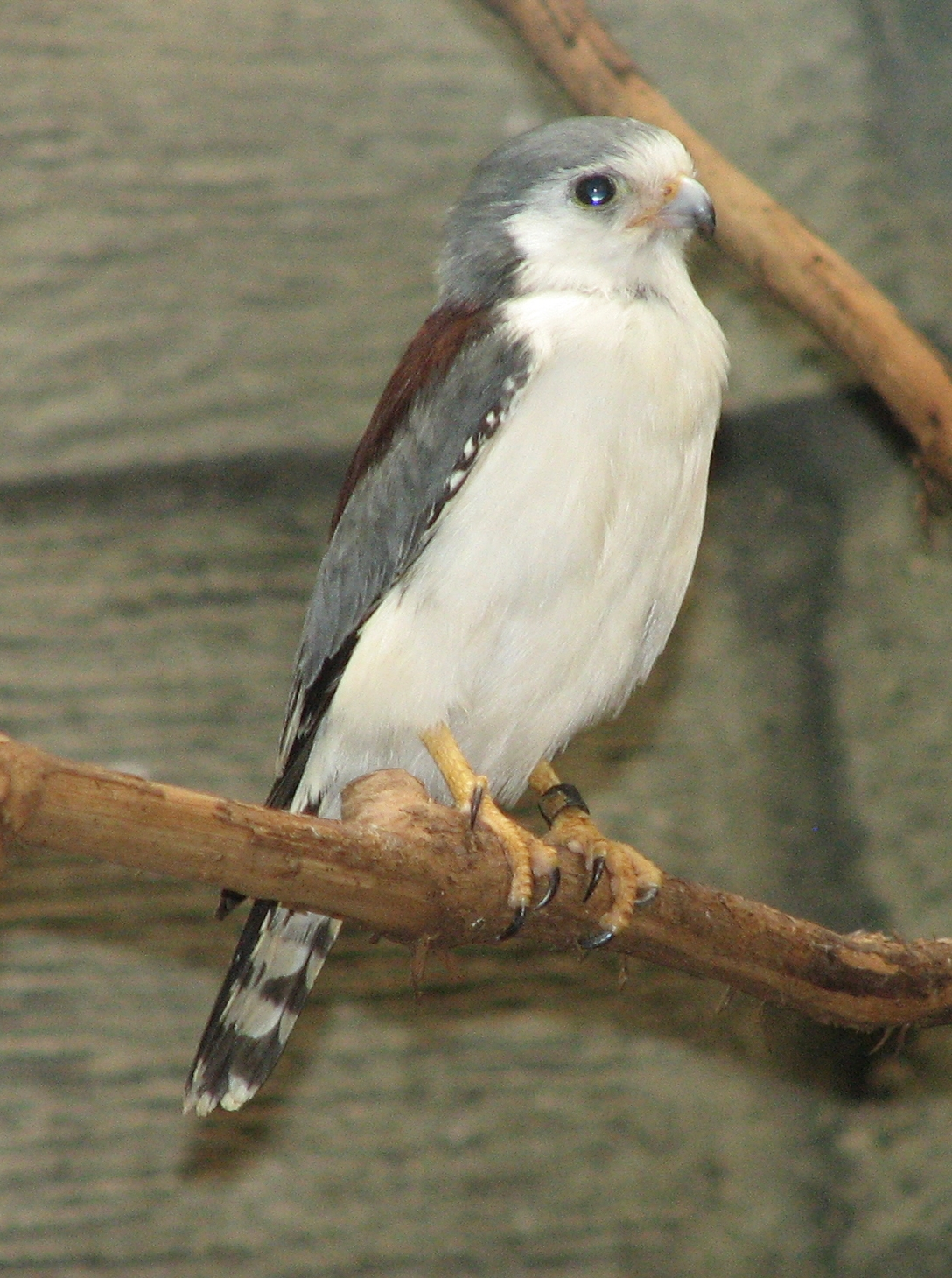
African pygmy falcon

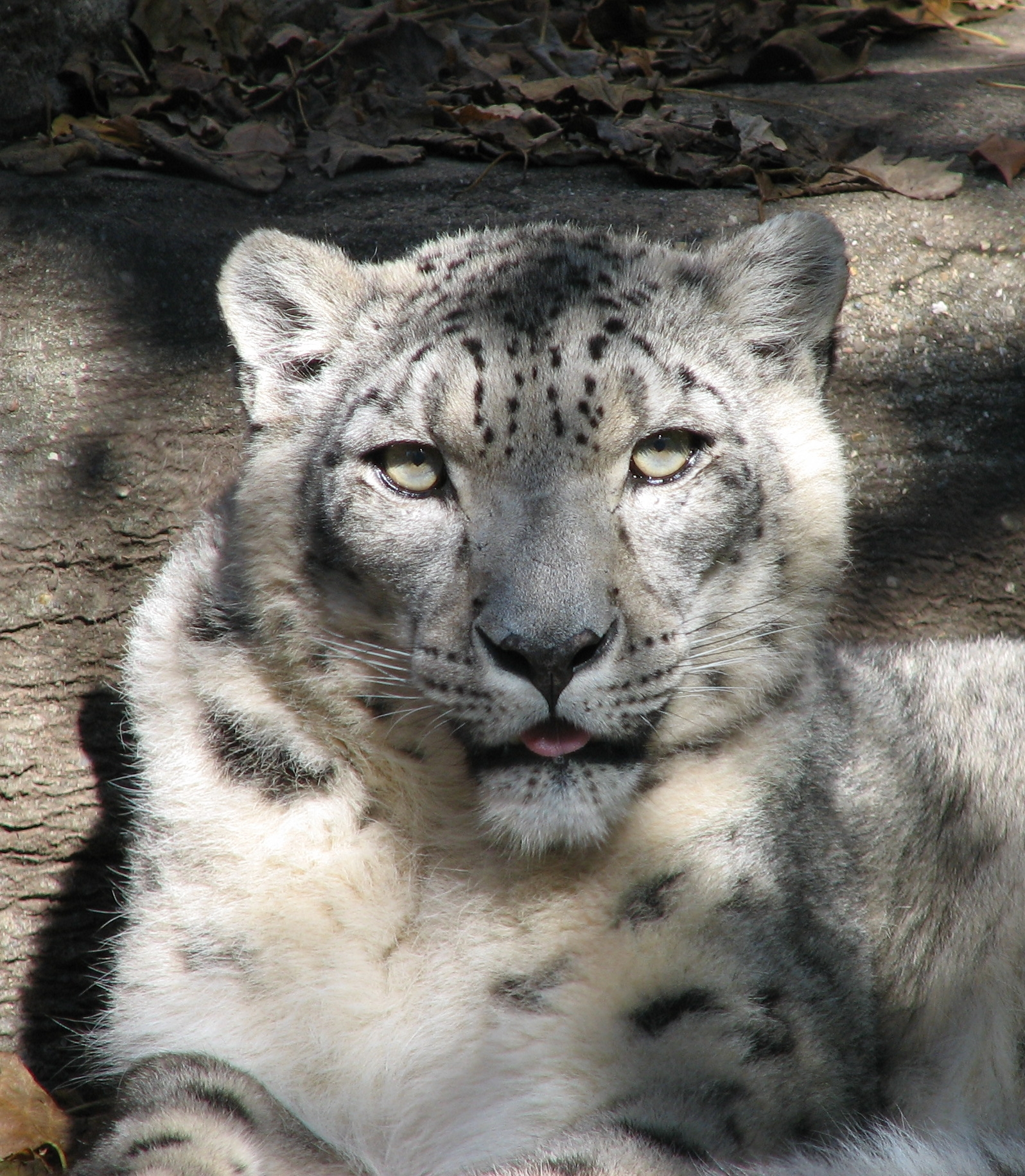
Snow leopard

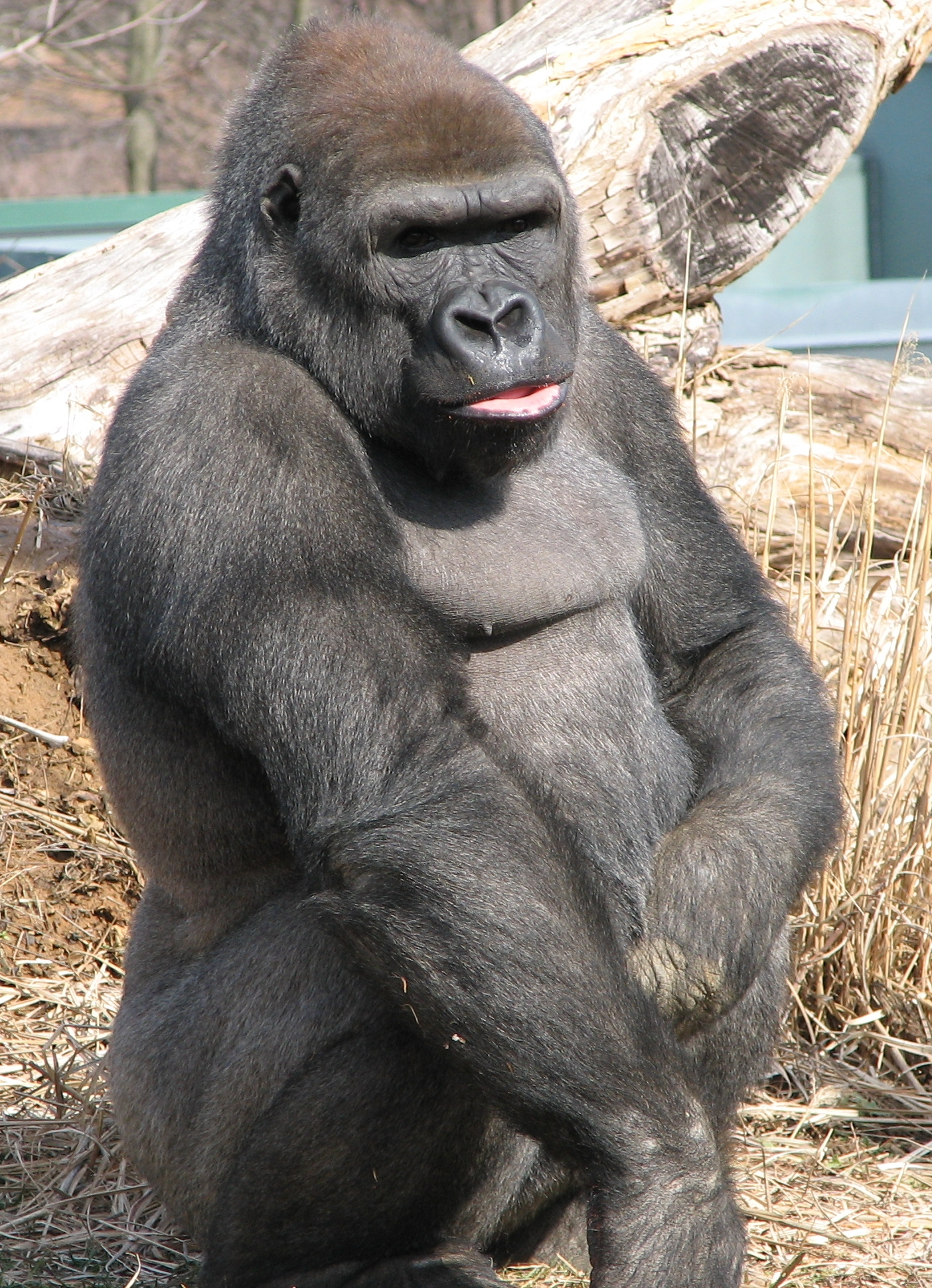
Western lowland gorilla

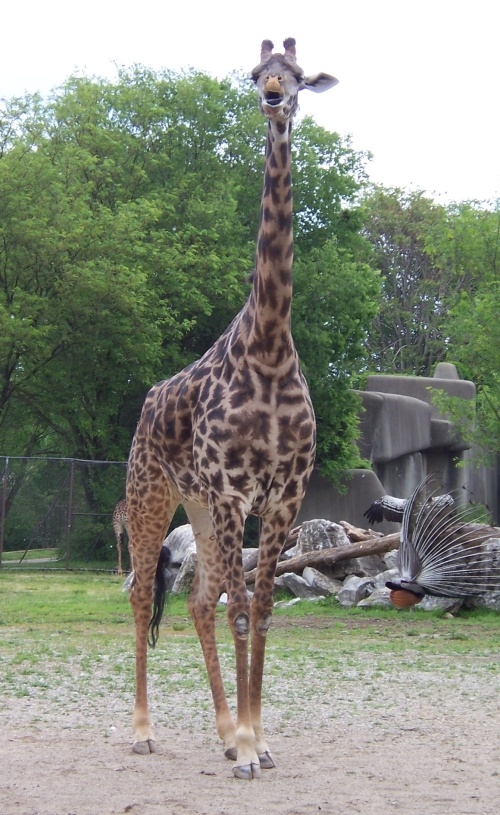
Masai giraffe

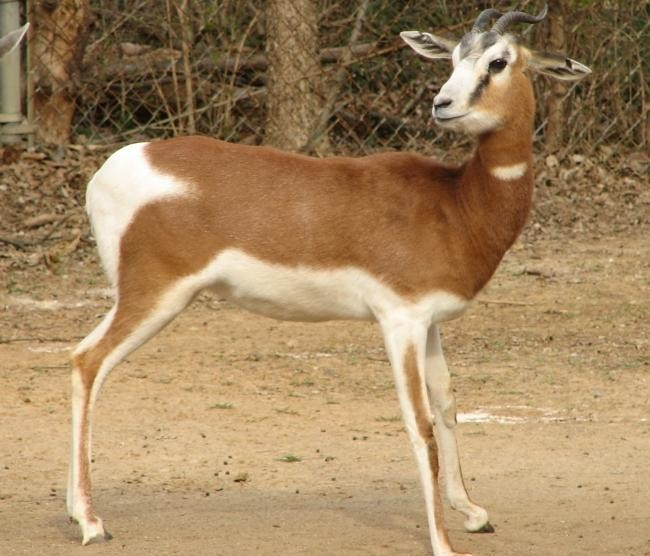
Mhorr gazelle

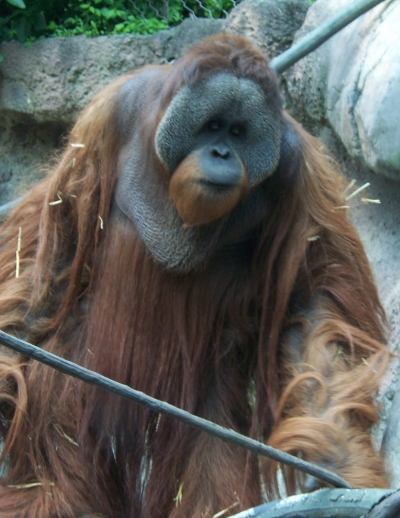
Orangutan

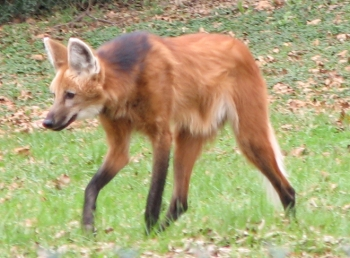
Maned wolf

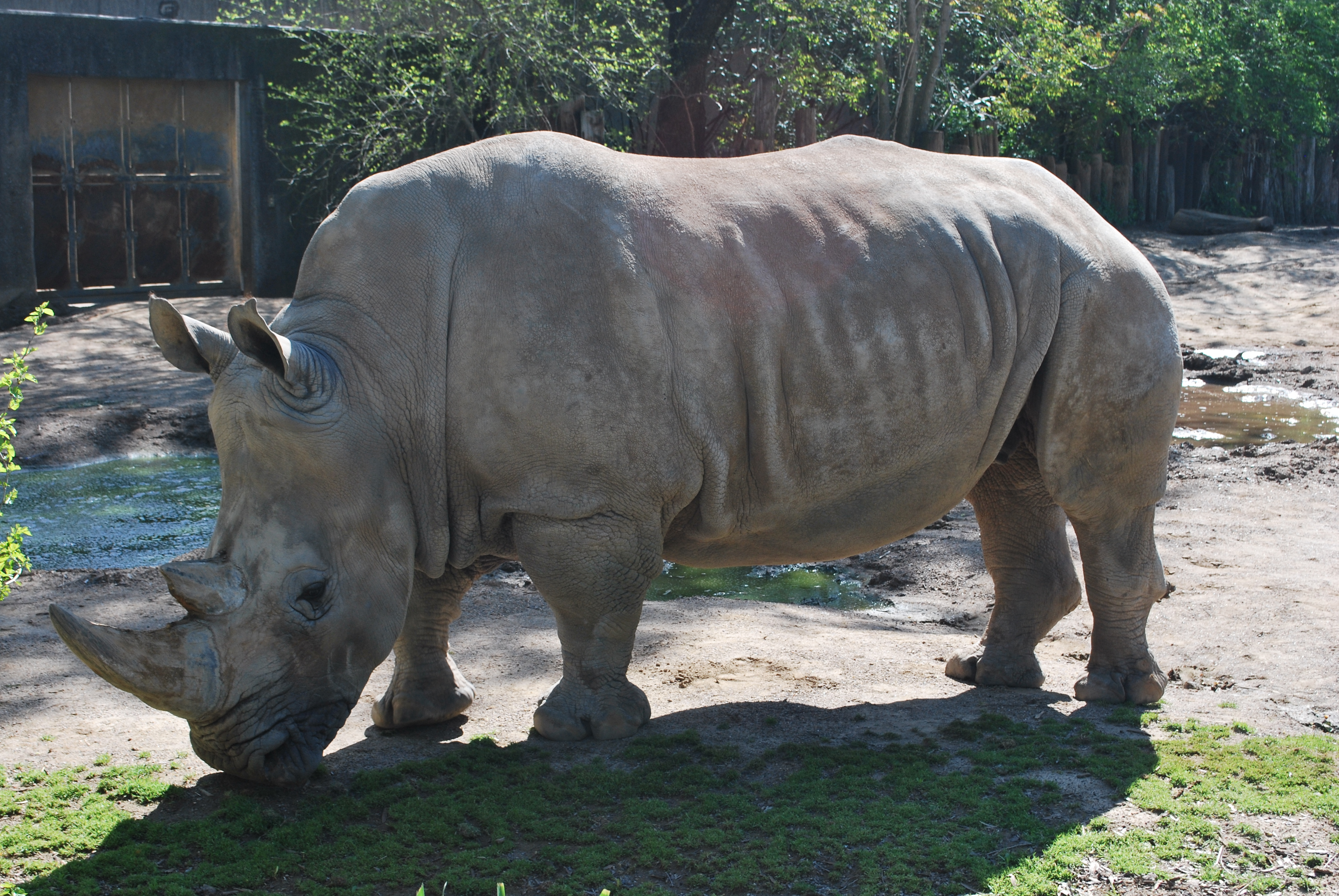
Southern white rhinoceros

== Notable individual animals ==
- Mojo, a patas monkey previously owned by NASCAR driver Tony Stewart, was given to the zoo on August 24, 2007, when he became too aggressive to keep as a pet.
- Scotty, an African elephant born on March 18, 2007, was the first elephant born in Kentucky. Scotty died on May 12, 2010, when he was only three years old, due to severe gastric and intestinal problems.
- The Louisville Zoo has hand-raised three baby siamangs—Sungai (from the San Francisco Zoo), Zoli (born at the Louisville Zoo), and Zain (from the Albuquerque Biological Park) after Zoli's parents died of E. coli sepsis and the other two were brought in as companions—and is thought to be the only Zoo to ever hand raise three baby siamangs this young.
- The zoo is also home to several black-footed ferrets, and participates in the black-footed ferret breeding program. The ferrets are one of the most endangered species in North America.
- Bakari (whose name is Swahili for hopeful) the Masai giraffe was born on February 17, 2009, with angular limb deformity, and had periosteal stripping performed on his leg. He is believed to be the first giraffe to undergo this procedure.
- Born in Alaska of 2011, a polar bear cub named Qannik was found orphaned on Alaska's North Slope and was rescued by the Alaska Zoo. During this time, the zoo was building Glacier Run and this new exhibit was deemed an ideal place for the new cub to go to by the AZA. Soon with the partnership of UPS, the cub was transported via air to the zoo in what was known as "Operation Snowflake".
- In June 2013, the Louisville Zoo organized a contest to name the first zebra foal to be born at the zoo in 13 years. The foal was ultimately named Ziva, after the fictional character Ziva David from the television series NCIS.
- On October 23, 2014, the zoo announced that their 11-year-old reticulated python, Thelma, had produced six healthy baby snakes in 2012 without any prior interaction with a male. She is the first known individual of her species (the world's largest species of snake) to have done so in captivity. It had initially been thought that the offspring were produced from long-stored sperm, until genetic testing showed that the neonates were "half clones" – i.e., she was their only genetic parent.

== Events ==
The Louisville Zoo offers multiple chances to enjoy the zoo after normal operating hours. One of the most popular after-hours events is the "World's Largest Halloween Party". This event is held on October 31 yearly and is Halloween themed. Another popular event is "Brew at the Zoo", which is an event that brings together local restaurants and craft beer vendors. Live entertainment is also provided. This event is typically in August and regularly sells out. The zoo has a booth called "Handimals" located by the entrance where kids can make an animal out of their hand prints. Often when an animal is born in the zoo, the zoo holds a contest where participants send in ideas for names.

== Incidents ==
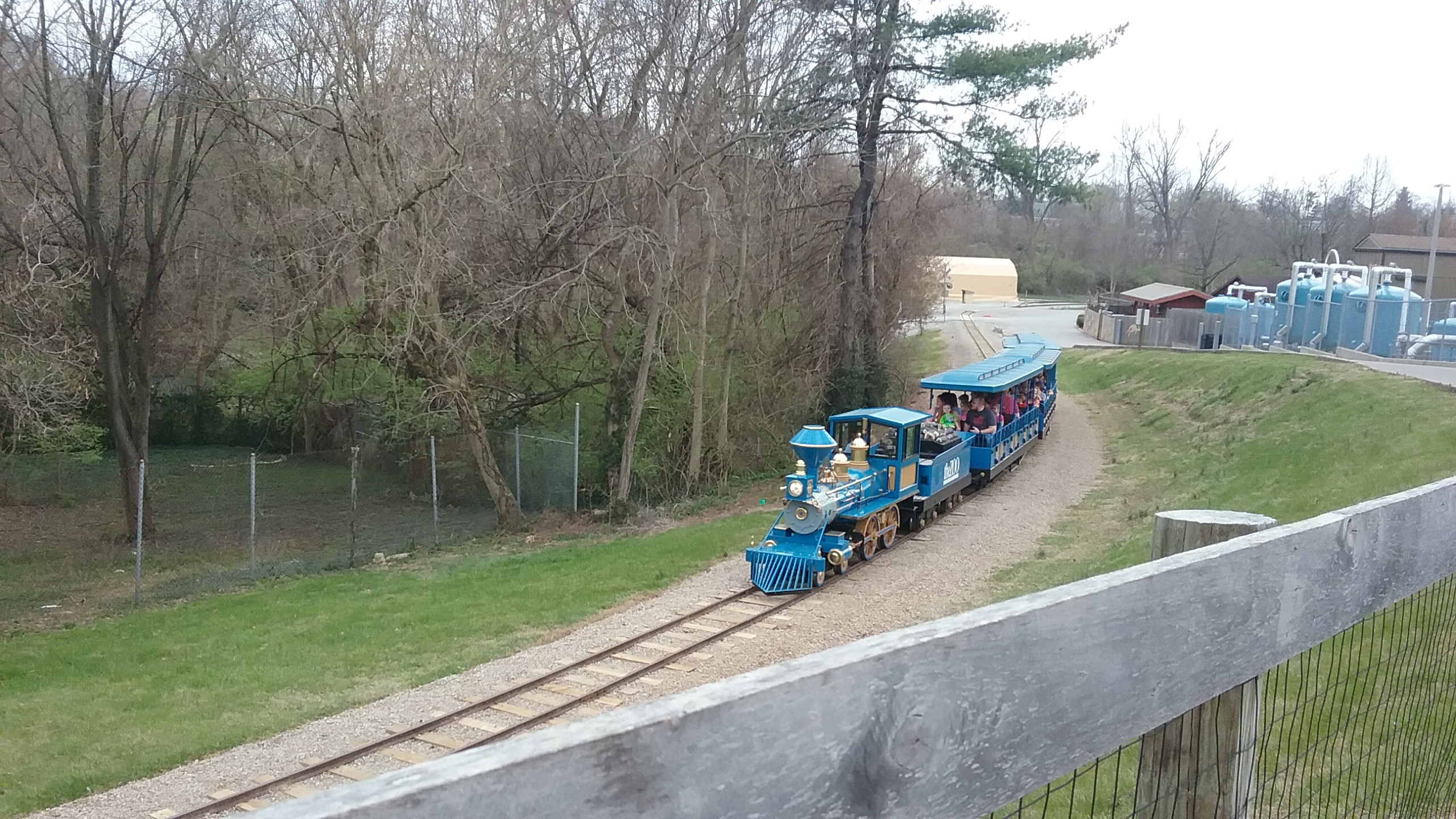
The Louisville Zoo train after the 2009 derailment and before the 2019 roof mine collapse

On June 29, 1994, a man was picked up and dropped several times by a female African elephant named Kenya. As a result of the man's injuries, his spleen and part of his pancreas were removed. Kenya had just finished giving rides to zoo visitors and was being led away when she wandered off and picked up the man. Zoo officials said that Kenya, who was normally considered calm and docile, was just "horsing around".

On June 1, 2009, the zoo train derailed. Three open-air cars and the engine went off the tracks and caused the passenger car to topple over, due to excessive speed and operator inexperience. The incident injured 22 people. An Indiana family that was on the train when the accident happened sued the Louisville Zoo. Amy and Darren Bamforth filed the lawsuit on June 10, 2009. Another family in Louisville who was on the train, also filed a suit. They sought unspecified monetary damages as well as a court order preventing the zoo from altering or destroying the train while the lawsuit proceeds. A spokesman for the zoo declined to comment. The zoo train was closed for four years. On July 2, 2013, the zoo train reopened to the public after buying new trains and investing in expanded training procedures. All legal actions regarding the incident were concluded as of October 2015. The two trains were eventually sold at auction in 2021 after shutting down in March 2019 due to the sinkhole. One went to Fort Worth Zoo in Fort Worth, Texas and the other went to Buffalo Trace Distillery in Franklin County, Kentucky. As of early 2024, there are eventual plans to get new trains.

On March 6, 2019, the zoo found a sinkhole after part of a mine collapsed in an undeveloped area near Mega Cavern.

== See also ==
- List of attractions and events in the Louisville metropolitan area
- List of parks in the Louisville metropolitan area
- Senning's Park, Louisville's first zoo
