= 1971 First National Tennis Classic =

1971 Louisville WCT
- Date: July 19–25
- Edition: 2nd
- Category: World Championship Tennis (WCT)
- Draw: 32S / 16D
- Prize money: $50,000
- Surface: Clay / outdoor
- Location: Louisville, Kentucky, U.S.
- Venue: Louisville Tennis Center

Champions

Singles
- (Netherlands) Tom Okker

Doubles
- (Australia) Ken Rosewall / (Australia) Fred Stolle (Australia) Roy Emerson / (Australia) Rod Laver
- Louisville Open

The 1971 First National Tennis Classic, also known as the Louisville WCT, was a men's tennis tournament played on outdoor clay courts at the Louisville Tennis Center in Louisville, Kentucky, United States. It was the second edition of the tournament and was held from July 19 through July 25, 1971. The tournament was part of the 1971 World Championship Tennis circuit and offered total prize money of $50,000. The singles final was won by Tom Okker who earned $10,000 first-prize money.

== Finals ==
=== Singles ===
(Netherlands) Tom Okker defeated (South Africa) Cliff Drysdale 3–6, 6–4, 6–1

=== Doubles ===
(Australia) Ken Rosewall / (Australia) Fred Stolle and (Australia) Roy Emerson / (Australia) Rod Laver not played, divided
