= Mega Cavern =

Coordinates: 38.201585°N 85.704127°W

- Interactive map of the Mega Cavern area

General information
- Location: 1841 Taylor Ave. Louisville, Kentucky

Website
- www.louisvillemegacavern.com

The Mega Cavern is a former limestone mine in Louisville, Kentucky. It stretches under parts of the Watterson Expressway and the Louisville Zoo. Due to the mine's support structures, it is classified as a building and is the largest building in Kentucky. The space is used for business, storage, recycling, and tourism, with offerings including tram-guided tours, zipline tours, a ropes course, an annual holiday lights display, and, previously, a mountain bike park.

== Description ==
The Mega Cavern is a 4,000,000 square foot (370,000 m^{2}) structure located in Louisville, Kentucky. About 75–100 feet (23–30 m) underground, the mine stretches under parts of the Watterson Expressway and the Louisville Zoo. Due to its support structures, it is classified as a building and is the largest building in Kentucky.

== History and use ==
=== Limestone mine ===
The mine was originally called Louisville Crushed Stone. It was created by a massive limestone quarry—with miners blasting out rock for over 42 years during the middle of the 20th century. It was acquired in 1989 by private investors who saw the potential to develop a portion of the space into an environmentally-conscious high security commercial storage facility.

=== Renovation ===
==== Business park ====
Exhausted of its mineable limestone, the property was purchased by Jim Lowry, Tom Tyler and Don Tyler in 1989 to be made into a "high-security business park". In February 2015, the mine housed 12 businesses in around 700,000 square feet (65,000 m^{2}).

==== Storage ====
Because of its relatively stable temperature around 50–60 °F (10–16 °C) and humidity, the mine was renovated to be used for storage. To be useful, the floor was raised by filling in parts of the mine with recycled materials. A fire-resistant safety corridor was also installed as an emergency exit. Various rooms are located throughout the mine to store various items from road salt and vehicles to pretzels and amusement park rides.

==== Tourism ====
In 2009, the Mega Cavern began offering a Jeep-drawn tour of the area where the floor had been raised. Around Christmas, the mine hosts "Lights Under Louisville" where visitors can drive through the mine and view lighted holiday decorations; it is the largest such underground display in the world. Several years later, a zipline tour and a ropes course were added to the offerings.

With national and international attention, an underground mountain bike park was opened to riders of all skill levels in February 2015. It was designed by Joe Prisel with families in mind, and constructed in over 3 months. With 45 trails in 350,000 sq ft (33,000 m^{2}) of the mine's space, it was the world's largest indoor bicycle park. The 12 miles (19 km) of trails (over 5 miles (8.0 km) interconnected) include "jump lines, pump tracks, dual slalom, BMX, cross country, and singletrack" and signs to indicate the difficulty of the trails. Bike rentals were planned to be offered in the near future. Partially due to the Mega Cavern's recycling business that filled the mine, trails were built with in layers with a rough bottom, sticky, red clay middle, and "good stuff" on top. The bike park is permanently closed.

== See also ==
- List of attractions and events in the Louisville metropolitan area
- SubTropolis, a similar but much larger mine in Kansas City, Missouri
