= Joe Creason =

American journalist

Joe Creason (June 10, 1918 – August 14, 1974) was a journalist who wrote for The Courier-Journal in Louisville, Kentucky.

He was born in Benton, Kentucky, which he would later humorously call "the only town in Kentucky where I was born." After graduation from the University of Kentucky in 1940, he became the editor of a Benton newspaper, and then the editor of a newspaper in Murray. He then accepted a position as a sports reporter, feature writer, and columnist for The Courier-Journal in 1941.

His popular column, "Joe Creason's Kentucky," began in 1963 and documented the lives of everyday Kentuckians. Creason traveled through every county in Kentucky in search of material for these stories, and he often printed stories sent in to him by readers. These articles were written in a quirky and simple style, featuring colorful and amusing characters. The articles were collected into two books and a record album.

Creason was also an amateur historian, and he co-wrote and edited "The Civil War in Kentucky," an award-winning newspaper supplement. He was also president of the University of Kentucky Alumni Association.

Creason is credited with starting the movement to make the Kentucky coffeetree the first official state tree of Kentucky, a status it held from 1976 until 1994 when it was replaced by the tulip poplar.

Creason continued writing and working until his death, which occurred while playing tennis with WHAS radio personality Milton Metz. Joe Creason Park, where he died, is named after him.

The Bingham family that owned The Courier-Journal, other friends of Creason, and alumni of the University of Kentucky made donations to the UK School of Journalism to establish the Joe Creason Lecture Series, which began in 1977 with a lecture by columnist James J. Kilpatrick. James Reston of The New York Times gave the next lecture, in 1979, and it has been held each year since.
