= Beargrass Creek (Kentucky) =

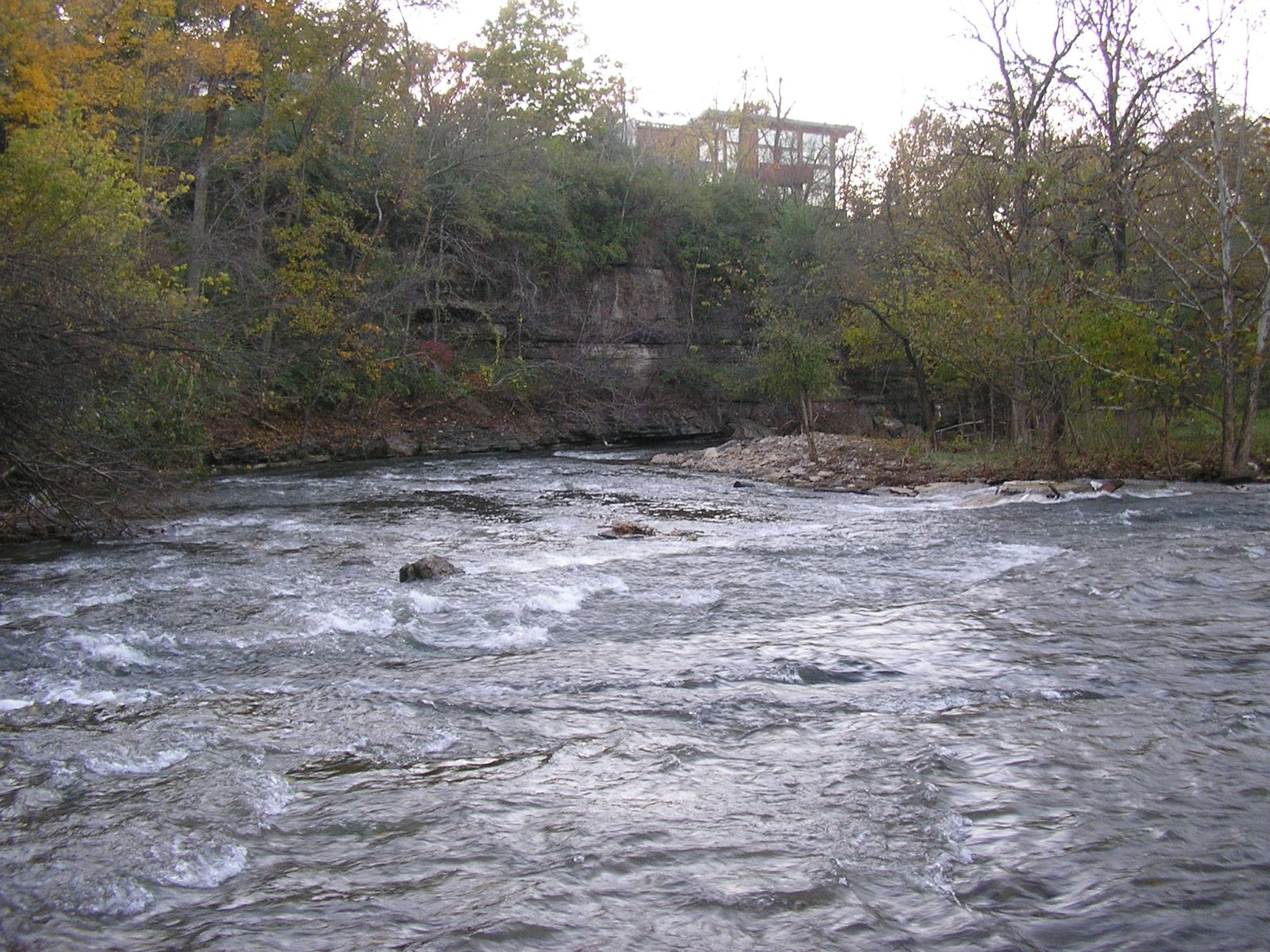
- Middle fork of Beargrass Creek in Cherokee Park, near Big Rock

- Location of the river mouth in Kentucky

Location
- Country: United States

Physical characteristics
- Mouth
  - location: Ohio River at River Road in Louisville, Kentucky
  - coordinates: 38.266944°N 85.721389°W
  - elevation: 412 ft (126 m)
- Basin size: 60 square miles (160 km^{2})
- Discharge
  - average: 103 cubic feet per second

Beargrass Creek is the name given to several forks of a creek in Jefferson County, Kentucky. Its watershed is one of the largest in the county, though it is fairly small. The forks have contributed to the geography that has shaped the area. The origin of the name Beargrass is not clear.

== History ==
As the forks wind through the area that has become Louisville's East End, they have contributed to the geography that has shaped the area.

The earliest settlements by Europeans in the area were built in the form of stations, or forts, along the banks of the creek. The three forks drain about 70 square miles (181 km^{2}) of land, and occasionally flood. Following the construction of the U.S. Army base at Bowman Field in 1940, it was found that the area's limestone was causing septic tanks in Seneca Gardens to malfunction and wash raw waste into the creek. Wartime rationing, feuding, and price disputes with Louisville delayed correcting the problem until 1946.

Although used just for drainage and as a scenic feature by the 20th century, in pioneer days it was navigable and used for that purpose.

=== Etymology ===
The origin of the name Beargrass is not clear, though local stories abound and it was written as Baregrass Creek and Bear Grass Creek in early maps.

Lyndon Lore states, "The name Beargrass was originally Bear Grasse, because the bears came to the creek for water and also for salt from the salt licks which were located near Salt River." However, a map of Louisville from 1780 shows the name as Baregrass Creek.

== Branches ==
Beargrass Creek refers to several forks of a creek in Jefferson County, Kentucky. The Beargrass Creek watershed is one of the largest in the county, draining over 60 square miles (160 km^{2}). It is fairly small, with an average discharge of 103 cubic feet per second (2.9 m^{3}/s) at River Road in Louisville.

The three main branches are the South, Middle and Muddy Forks. They separate just east of Downtown Louisville. The South Fork runs through Butchertown and Germantown to west of Tyler Park, through the Poplar Level area (where the Beargrass Creek State Nature Preserve is located) and eventually the Fern Creek neighborhood. Eleven Jones Cave is located along this fork.

The south fork originally ran through downtown, but was rerouted in the 1850s. The original route was turned into a sewer. In the 1920s, the stretch near Germantown was placed into a concrete channel. The current channelized state of the creek bed and Louisville's continued problems with Combined Sewer Overflows (CSOs) often leads to poor water quality in the creek. Following heavy rain events one should avoid contact with the creek if at all possible.

The middle fork has two branches, called Weicher Creek and the Sinking Fork. Weicher Creek flows from the Hurstborne Area, and the Sinking Fork has its headwaters near Anchorage, Kentucky. They join in St. Matthews and flow through Cherokee Park until it meets the South Fork near the Bourbon Stockyards. The Muddy Fork rises at a stone springhouse in Windy Hills and runs parallel to the Ohio River and was rerouted during the construction of Interstate 71.

== Activism ==
The Beargrass Creek Alliance, a local volunteer watershed group of the Kentucky Waterways Alliance does outreach and projects to improve the quality of Beargrass Creek.

== See also ==
- List of rivers of Kentucky
- Geography of Louisville, Kentucky
