= Louisville Open =

Defunct tennis tournament
- Event name: Louisville Open (1970, 1973–79); Louisville WCT (1971–72)
- Tour: Grand Prix circuit (1970, 1973–79); WCT circuit (1971–72)
- Founded: 1970
- Abolished: 1979
- Editions: 10
- Surface: Hard (1970); Clay (1971–79)

The Louisville Open is a defunct Grand Prix and WCT affiliated men's tennis tournament played from 1970 to 1979. It was held in Louisville, Kentucky in the United States and played on outdoor hard courts in 1970 and on outdoor clay courts from 1971 to 1979.

Guillermo Vilas was the most successful player at the tournament, winning the singles competition three times and the doubles competition once with Pole Wojciech Fibak.

== Results ==
=== Singles ===
Year	Champions	Runners-up	Score
1970	(Australia) Rod Laver	(Australia) John Newcombe	6–3, 6–3
1971	(Netherlands) Tom Okker	(South Africa) Cliff Drysdale	3–6, 6–4, 6–1
1972	(United States) Arthur Ashe	(United Kingdom) Mark Cox	6–4, 6–4
1973	(Spain) Manuel Orantes	(Australia) John Newcombe	3–6, 6–3, 6–4
1974	(Argentina) Guillermo Vilas	(Chile) Jaime Fillol	6–4, 7–5
1975	(Argentina) Guillermo Vilas	(Romania) Ilie Năstase	6–4, 6–3
1976	(United States) Harold Solomon	(Poland) Wojciech Fibak	6–2, 7–5
1977	(Argentina) Guillermo Vilas	(United States) Eddie Dibbs	1–6, 6–0, 6–1
1978	(United States) Harold Solomon	(Australia) John Alexander	6–2, 6–2
1979	(Australia) John Alexander	(United States) Terry Moor	7–6, 6–7, 3–3 ret.

=== Doubles ===
Year	Champions	Runners-up	Score
1970	(Australia) John Newcombe (Australia) Tony Roche	(Australia) Roy Emerson (Australia) Rod Laver	8–6, 5–7, 6–4
1971	Final not played		
1972	(Australia) John Alexander (Australia) Phil Dent	(United States) Arthur Ashe (United States) Robert Lutz	6–4, 6–3
1973	(Spain) Manuel Orantes (Romania) Ion Țiriac	(United States) Clark Graebner (Australia) John Newcombe	0–6, 6–4, 6–3
1974	(United States) Charlie Pasarell (United States) Erik van Dillen	(West Germany) Jürgen Fassbender (West Germany) Hans-Jürgen Pohmann	6–2, 6–3
1975	(Poland) Wojciech Fibak (Argentina) Guillermo Vilas	(India) Anand Amritraj (India) Vijay Amritraj	Not played (rain)
1976	(South Africa) Byron Bertram (South Africa) Pat Cramer	(United States) Stan Smith (United States) Erik van Dillen	6–3, 6–4
1977	(Australia) John Alexander (Australia) Phil Dent	(Australia) Chris Kachel (Australia) Cliff Letcher	6–1, 6–4
1978	(Poland) Wojciech Fibak (Paraguay) Víctor Pecci	(United States) Victor Amaya (Australia) John James	6–4, 6–7, 6–4
1979	(United States) Marty Riessen (United States) Sherwood Stewart	(India) Vijay Amritraj (Mexico) Raúl Ramírez	6–2, 1–6, 6–1
