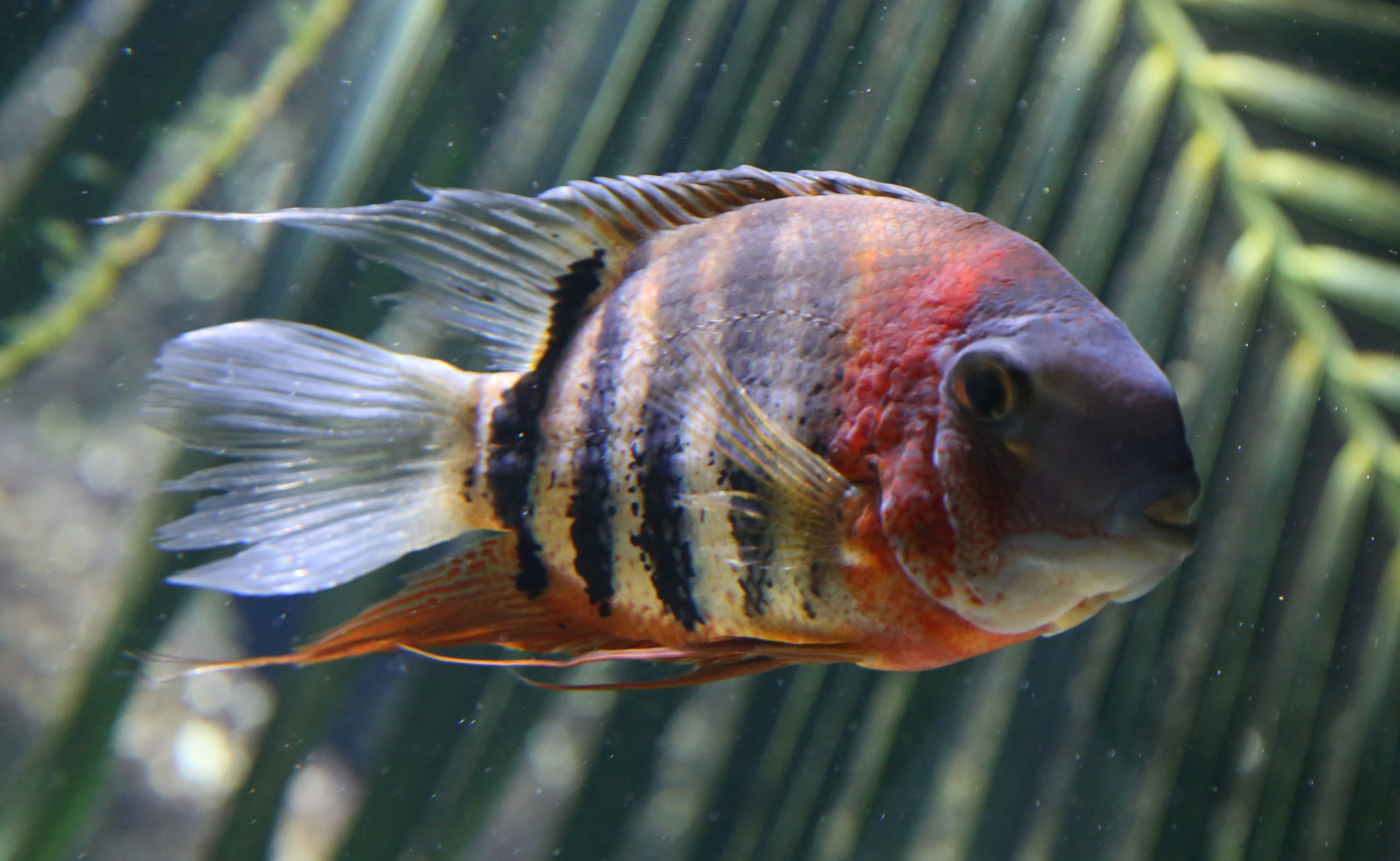

Scientific classification
- Kingdom: Animalia
- Phylum: Chordata
- Class: Actinopterygii
- Order: Cichliformes
- Family: Cichlidae
- Genus: Heros
- Species: H. efasciatus

Binomial name
- Heros efasciatus Heckel, 1840

Synonyms
- Chromys appendiculata Castelnau, 1855; Heros appendiculatus (Castelnau, 1855); Chromys fasciata Castelnau, 1855; Uarus centrarchoides Cope, 1872

= Heros efasciatus =

Species of fish

Heros efasciatus is a species of tropical freshwater cichlid native to the Amazon basin in South America. It is commonly found in the aquarium trade, often in its gold colored variation rather than the wild-type olive green one.

== Diet ==
Heros efasciatus is one of the few cichlid species that act as a regular frugivore, quite notably during the wet season when riparian zones become inundated with water.

== Concerns ==
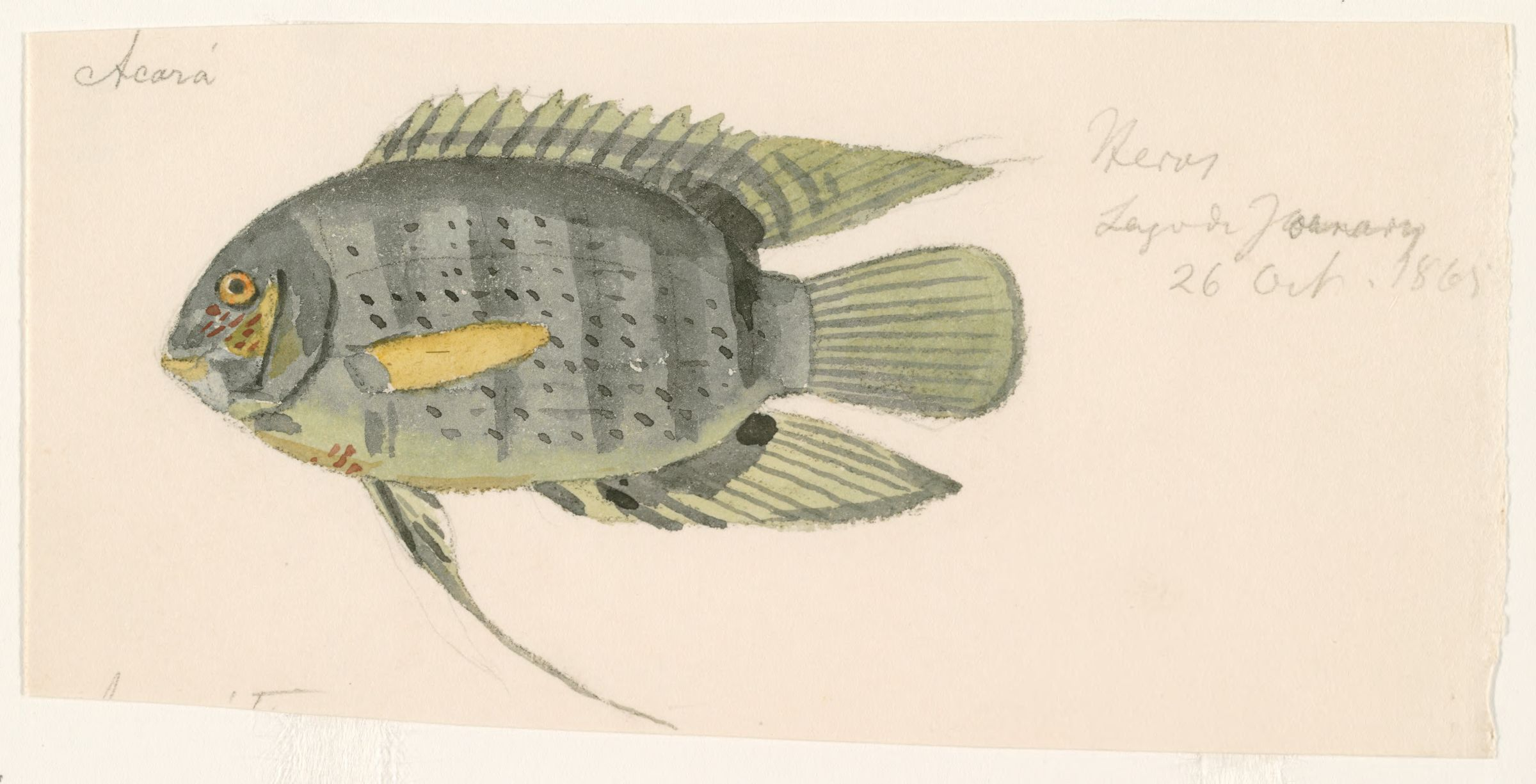
An 1865 watercolor painting of heros efasciatus by Jacques Burkhardt.

Over the past few years, the popularity of Heros efasciatus within the aquarium trade has increased. Consequently, this species could be susceptible to over-exploitation, primarily because of their natural low densities and low fecundity.
