= Joe Creason Park =

Place in Louisville, Kentucky, U.S.

- Location within Kentucky
- Type: Municipal park
- Location: Louisville, Kentucky, United States
- Coordinates: 38°12′36″N 85°42′24″W
- Area: 68 acres (280,000 m^{2})
- Created: 1966
- Operator: Louisville Metro Parks
- Status: Open

Joe Creason Park is a municipal park in Louisville, Kentucky, United States. Located in the Poplar Level neighborhood, it is in roughly the central portion of the city. The park adjoins and connects to Beargrass Creek State Nature Preserve, and both were originally part of the same property prior to becoming parks.

The park is located on the south fork of Beargrass Creek. It opened as a park in 1966.

The park is named for Joe Creason, a popular features journalist for The Courier-Journal, who died while playing tennis at the park's Louisville Tennis Center in 1974.

== History ==
In 1789, Joseph Kinney and Basil Prather purchased the land that became the park as adjoining estates from Robert Daniel. Kinney built a house where the current Metro Parks administration building stands; Prather's house was located to the northwest, across Illinois Avenue near where the Quarry Shopping Center is today.

Kinney's estate was called Fox Hill and passed through several owners. John B. Castleman, a Confederate veteran and local real estate investor, owned the property from 1885 to 1894 and renamed it Castleford. Ben Collings, a construction materials supplier specializing in concrete, purchased the property in 1937 and renamed it Colonial Farms.

The Basil Prather estate was partitioned after his death, with numerous owners over the years until they were acquired for the temporary Camp Taylor operation during World War I. Ben Collings permanently reassembled them after the war.

Collings accumulated almost 200 acres (0.81 km^{2}) by the time of his death in 1951, including much of what became the Louisville Zoo. His widow sold some of the land to private interests and the Archdiocese of Louisville. Bellarmine College purchased the remainder of the estate. In 1966, the city of Louisville paid Bellarmine approximately $600,000 ($5.95 million today) for 68 acres (280,000 m^{2}), including the mansion.

The farm had been used to grow tobacco at some points, but by Collings' ownership it was a horse farm. It was also used as an orchard, and a few fruit trees still remain. The Prather graveyard still remains on the property.

=== Mansion ===
After the original 154-year-old farmhouse burnt down, Ben Collings built the current park mansion in 1944. Determined to avoid another fire, Collings had the mansion built with thick concrete walls and floors and a copper and slate roof. This sturdy construction made it suitable for use as Louisville Metro Parks's headquarters.

=== Park history ===
The National Recreation and Park Association held its annual conference at Joe Creason Park in 1982.

== Park features ==
Joe Creason Park includes the Louisville Tennis Center, where 25 Grand Slam players have competed, including Arthur Ashe, Rod Laver, Jimmy Connors, Billie Jean King and John McEnroe. The center has 11 clay courts, seating for 400 spectators and a clubhouse.

A 1.5-mile (2.4 km) paved multi-use path was added to the park in 2007.

There is also a playground, picnic shelter and a field suitable for soccer.

Joe Creason Park is home to Joe Creason Parkrun held every Saturday morning at 9:00 AM

== See also ==
- List of parks in the Louisville metropolitan area
