= Zanchi =

Zanchi is an Italian surname. Notable people with the name include:

- Antonio Zanchi (1631–1722), Italian painter
- Basilio Zanchi (1501–1558), Italian humanist and scholar
- Emanuela Zanchi (born 1977), Italian water polo player
- Ferruccio Zanchi (born 2006), Italian motocross racer
- Giovanni Battista Zanchi (1515–1586), Italian engineer and author
- Girolamo Zanchi (1516–1590), Italian Reformed theologian
- Honoré Zanchi (born 1962), French serial killer and convicted criminal
- Marco Zanchi (born 1977), Italian footballer
- Mario Zanchi (1939–1976), Italian cyclist

== See also ==
- Zangi, members of a Turkic dynasty in Syria
