= Zangi =

Zangi or Zengi may refer to:

== People ==
- Imad al-Din Zengi (1085–1146), Turkish noble
  - Zengid dynasty, a Muslim dynasty of Oghuz Turkic origin
  - Nur ad-Din (died 1174) (Nūr al-Dīn Maḥmūd Zengī), his second son
- Mohammad Shammaa Al Zengi III (1883–1954), Syrian textile magnate
  - Akram Shammaa (Akram Shammaa Al Zengi, 1930–2012), his son

== Places ==
- Zangi, Azerbaijan
- Zangi, East Azerbaijan, Iran
- Zangi, Kermanshah, Iran

== Software ==
- Zangi, Messaging and VoIP Service

== Other uses ==
- Zangi, a regional version of the Japanese food karaage
