= Zangi, Iran =

Zangi (Persian: زنگي) may refer to:

- Zangi, East Azerbaijan
- Zangi, Kermanshah
