= Mohammed III =

Mohammed III may refer to:

- Muhammad III of Córdoba (fl. 1024 – 1025), Umayyad Caliph of Cordoba
- Muhammad an-Nasir, Caliph of Morocco from 1198 to 1213
- Muhammed III, Sultan of Granada (1256–1310), son of Muhammed II al-Faqih and third Nasrid ruler of Granada in Iberia
- Mehmed III, Sultan of the Ottoman Empire from 1595 to 1603
- Abdul Abdallah Mohammed III Saadi, Sultan of Morocco from 1603 to 1608
- Mohamed III ben Hassan, Dey of Algiers from 1718 to 1724
- Mohammed III of Morocco, Sultan of Morocco from 1757 to 1790
- Muhammad III as-Sadiq, Bey of Tunis from 1859 to 1882
- Mohammed III Shammaa Zengi, Prince of Zengid Dynasty from 1883 – 1954
