= Zangi, Azerbaijan =

Zangi
- Location within Azerbaijan
- Coordinates: 40°54′N 48°17′E
- Country: Azerbaijan
- Rayon: Ismailli
- Time zone: UTC+4 (AZT)
  - Summer (DST): UTC+5 (AZT)

Zangi was a village in the Ismailli Rayon of Azerbaijan.
