= Honoré Zanchi =

French serial killer and convicted criminal (born 1962)

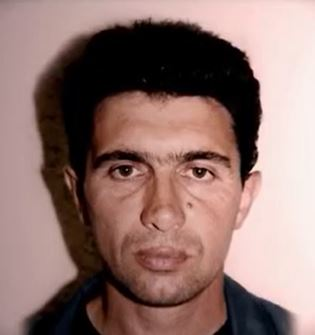
- Born: 4 May 1962 (age 64); Aiguèze, France
- Other names: "The Avenger" "The Cleaner" "The Helmeted Avenger" "The White Knight"
- Convictions: First degree murder x2 Second degree murder x2
- Penalty: 10 years (first murder); Life imprisonment, commuted to 30 years (latter murders)

Details
- Victims: 4
- Span of crimes: 1992; 2008 – 2009
- Country: France
- State: Auvergne-Rhône-Alpes
- Date apprehended: 27 April 2009

Honoré Zanchi (born 4 May 1962), known as The Avenger (French: Le Nettoyeur), is a French serial killer, gangster, thief, weapons illegal holder and repeat offender. He committed four murders between 1992 and 2009.

In February 1992, Zanchi killed a man after learning that the latter had assaulted one of his friends. Sentenced to 10 years' imprisonment, he was released in 1999, and was subsequently incarcerated several times until April 2008.

Between May 2008 and March 2009, Zanchi killed three others people to avenge his friend Jean-François André, who had been killed in 2003. Initially sentenced to life imprisonment, his sentence was reduced to 30 years on appeal.

== Biography ==
=== Youth ===
Honoré Zanchi was born on 4 May 1962, in Aiguèze, the third of four children. For the first years of his life, Zanchi lived what he later described as a happy life in his hometown, until 1969, when they moved to Annonay. Soon after, he began committing petty thefts and moved on to shoplifting during the 1970s. In 1977, aged 15, Zanchi left school to devote himself to manual labour.

=== First crimes ===
In 1978, Zanchi was 16 years old and found a job as a bricklayer. To support himself financially, Zanchi committed several bulgaries, including one at a cinema in Annonay. He was eventually arrested and sentenced to six-month suspended sentence and six months' imprisonment. He served a few months in prison in 1979, while still a minor.

In early 1980, at the age of 17, Zanchi met a young motorcyclist who was an expert in the field: Jean-François André. The two young men became very close and admired each other like brothers; they placed their friendship above all else. Zanchi quickly became a biker and hung out with André and his friends. However, Zanchi did not give up his criminal activities and served several prison sentences in the 1980s for theft, armed violence and assault and battery. His speciality was burglarising sports shops.

In 1985, when Jean-François André was setting up his future bar in a large building in La Thine (Drôme), Zanchi joined him and around thirty other bikers. André is a Harley-Davidson enthusiast and is nicknamed “La Pie”. He sets up his own business, and his passion becomes exponentially more popular. Although Zanchi commits his misdeeds alone, he remains very close to André. Zanchi and André are known to the police for some drug trafficking, but André avoids prison. Zanchi, on the other hand, continues his burglaries, robbing some thirty sports stores, for which he returns to prison several times. On 31 December 1990, Zanchi had a boy, Angelino, with his girlfriend, whom he had met in the 1980s.

== Murders ==
=== First murder ===
On 23 February 1992, Zanchi learned that one of his best friends had been lynched and assaulted by another man, whom he knew. Zanchi grabbed two 9 mm pistols, even though he did not have a firearms licence. Zanchi's goal was to "avenge" his friend by "teaching a lesson" to the person who had hurt him. Zanchi described his actions as a "code of honour towards his friends" in order to "avenge" them if anyone attacked them. Zanchi went to see his friend's attacker. He began to watch the bar-restaurant in Saint-Rambert-d'Albon, which he frequented daily. When he saw the attacker, Zanchi took out his pistols, which he held in each hand, and shot him. The victim died instantly, without having time to return Zanchi's fire.

After committing his crime, Zanchi leaves and decides to go to the police station to turn himself in. Placed in police custody, Zanchi confesses that he wanted to "avenge" one of his friends by murdering the man who had just "beaten him up". Zanchi admits that he feels solidarity with his friends. He did not appreciate anyone attacking them. At the end of his police custody, Zanchi was charged with first-degree murder and carrying a illegal possession of a weapon, then placed in pre-trial detention. Zanchi first appeared before the criminal court for illegal possession of a weapon and was convicted. Initially charged with first-degree murder, his charge was reclassified as second-degree murder, as the prosecution believed that Zanchi had no intention of killing before seeing his victim.

In 1996, Zanchi appeared before the Gard Assize Court for the second-degree murder of his friend's attacker. Solidarity with his friends, Zanchi confessed to being responsible for his crime, but pleaded self-defense with regard to his friend. Called to the stand, Zanchi's relatives testified that his other friends still supported him, despite the fact that he had committed murder. Zanchi's partner was also present during the hearing and continued to support him. To justify his murder, Zanchi confessed to having acted to "avenge the honour" of his friend when he was "beaten up". At the end of his trial, Zanchi was found guilty of second-degree murder and sentenced to 10 years' imprisonment. During his detention, his friend, Jean-François André, provided financial assistance to Zanchi's partner and son.

=== Release, returns to prison and turning point ===
Zanchi was released from prison in 1999, after seven years behind bars. Following his release, Zanchi returned to live with his partner, who continued to support him despite the crimes he had committed. He also resumed his association with Jean-François André, known as "La Pie", as well as the entire network and circle of acquaintances surrounding "La Pie", which had grown exponentially.

The Zanchi-Alleon couple reunited and welcomed twins on 2 November 2000, just a few months after Zanchi had been released from prison. The couple’s two youngest children are almost 10 years younger than their eldest son. Zanchi then decided to be an exemplary family man and to give up his life of crime. He wanted to spend time with his sons, as his eldest was too young at the time of his last arrest — Angelino was only one year old. In 2001, Zanchi was arrested for burglary and remanded in pre-trial detention. When he was released from prison in 2002, he was quickly re-imprisoned for illegal possession of weapons. Following this latest imprisonment, Alleon decided to leave him, after two decades of living together, as she could no longer tolerate her partner’s wayward behaviour. Zanchi served his sentence before being released in January 2003.

In August 2003, seven months after Zanchi's release, he learned that his best friend, Jean-François André (known as "La Pie"), had been murdered near his home at the age of 42. The news left Zanchi is affected and "devastated". This turning point made Zanchi feel "guilty" for not having been able to protect his friend from what was to come. In a rare occurrence, thousands of people from different countries attended André's funeral. Zanchi was also present at the ceremony. In November, several arrests were made among La Pie's associates, but there was insufficient evidence to charge any of the suspects. Zanchi was also questioned but was found to be completely innocent of the crime. The police received a tip-off from an informant identifying Michel Di-Bacco as the instigator and Gerald Crouzet as the perpetrator. While in custody, Di-Bacco claimed to have had dinner in a restaurant with a friend and his father-in-law. His alibi was confirmed after the two witnesses were questioned, but there was no evidence to suggest that he had not ordered the crime. As for Crouzet, he said he could not remember what he had done on the evening of the incident because too much time had passed. The police had no evidence against the two suspects and were forced to release them.

In May 2004, Zanchi was arrested again for illegal possession of weapons following a robbery. He was charged with these offences and placed in pre-trial detention. Zanchi was sentenced to five years in prison for these offences. He was also charged with criminal conspiracy, theft, handling stolen goods and robbery committed in 2003, but the case stalled due to lack of evidence. The investigation into André's murder continued, but was dismissed in 2008. In their final report, the police stated that the most likely theory was that it was a settling of scores, organised by Di-Bacco and carried out by Crouzet.

=== Release and serial murders ===
On 7 April 2008, Zanchi was released from prison. Still hellbent on avenging his best friend, he bought two unlicensed 9mm pistols and started stalking his future victims in an attempt to figure out the best way to kill them without being caught.

On the afternoon of 13 May, Gerald Crouzet, 46, was driving his car near Érôme. At an intersection, Zanchi crossed his path on a motorbike driven by an accomplice and passed in front of him. He fired a pistol at Crouzet, who lost control of his car and fell into a ditch. Seriously injured, Crouzet was in agony and died a few minutes later. Meanwhile, Zanchi fled in his car. Crouzet's lifeless body was discovered the same day when passers-by found his crashed car. According to all findings and autopsies, Crouzet's death was classified as a heart attack. The possibility of homicide was ruled out for the time being, and Crouzet was buried in the Arras-sur-Rhône cemetery. In the days following the incident, Zanchi confided in his former partner and an old friend of André's, confessing that he had killed Crouzet to ‘clear his name’. The bikers, who listened to Zanchi, had been extremely close to André before his murder. Despite Zanchi's claims, they refused to report him, as bikers stick together. Other former friends of André were informed, but did not press charges against Zanchi, also out of solidarity. Unlike after his first murder, Zanchi did not go to the police station to turn himself in; he was planning to kill Michel Di-Bacco, whom he still suspected of ordering André's murder.

On 29 July, at around 12.30 p.m., Zanchi parked his moped in front of the bar-restaurant in Arras-sur-Rhône, accompanied by an accomplice. Zanchi and his accomplice waited at the entrance to the bar for Michel Di-Bacco, 52, to leave the restaurant, of which he was the owner. Zanchi waited for a moment until he saw Di-Bacco. Upon seeing his future victim, Zanchi fired 13 9mm bullets at Michel Di-Bacco, who was riddled with bullets and died instantly. Following his latest crime, Zanchi fled and went to tell André's former partner that ‘her husband had been avenged’. When Michel Di-Bacco's body was discovered, a murder investigation was launched. Witnesses to the shooting claimed to have seen a man on a motorbike shoot the victim, but were unable to identify the model of the vehicle. They also disagree on the shooter's physical appearance: some describe a thin man, or even a woman, while others speak of a young man who looked like a teenager. As the investigation into Di-Bacco's death begins, several of the deceased's relatives speak more about a feud he had with Jean-François André five years earlier. Several testimonies are recorded in relation to the André and Di-Bacco cases in order to establish a connection between the two crimes. In the telephone wiretaps, Zanchi is also referred to as the ‘avenger’ because of his claims, but there is insufficient evidence to incriminate him. Another witness statement establishes a new link with the death of Gerald Crouzet, which occurred three months earlier.

In end of September, Crouzet's body was exhumed. The forensic scientist established that there was a bullet wound to the victim's head; Crouzet's death was therefore a homicide, caused by a firearm, and was in no way accidental. With the help of telephone tapping, Zanchi remained the prime suspect, although there was still insufficient evidence to arrest him. The investigators then decided to tap his mobile phone and bug his car in order to gather evidence on the man they suspected of being a serial killer. The wiretaps lasted several months but proved fruitless, as Zanchi was well acquainted with police procedures.

On 25 March 2009, Zanchi was driving along the roads of Arras-sur-Rhône. While driving, Zanchi came across Marc Nepote-Cit, 35, with whom tensions rose. Nepote-Cit was also Michel Di-Bacco's best friend and strongly suspected Zanchi of having murdered him. The encounter between Zanchi and Nepote-Cit sparked great hostility over the murders of Michel Di-Bacco and Jean-François André. Unable to tolerate resistance from one of his enemies, Zanchi held Nepote-Cit at gunpoint and took him to a deserted road in Vernosc-lès-Annonay, near Roche Péréandre, a place he described as ‘the rock where André died’. After dragging Nepote-Cit to the bottom of the rock, Zanchi killed him with several blows to the head — the weapon used in the crime is unknown — then stripped him naked to humiliate him. Following his latest murder – his fourth – Zanchi buried the victim at the foot of Roche Péréandre. Three days later, Népote-Cit's sister reported him missing. This new case intrigued investigators, who already suspected Zanchi in the first two murders. Looking at the phone bills, the investigators noticed that Zanchi and Népote-Cit's mobile phones were transmitting from the same location. In addition, they discovered that Zanchi's phone had remained at Roche Péréandre for 20 minutes.

During an intercepted phone conversation on 23 April, Zanchi gave one of his friends, Michel, an account of the murder which indirectly implied that he wanted to move Nepote-Cit's body and gave the name of the Roche Péréandre. The investigation immediately turns to Zanchi and names him as the main suspect. Suspicion does not stop with Zanchi's statements, however, as a call made by Zanchi confirms that Michel is aware of the crime. The investigators also wonder whether Zanchi may have claimed responsibility for the murders from other friends.

=== Arrest and investigation ===
Zanchi was arrested in Annonay on 27 April 2009, while staying with his mistress. In police custody, Zanchi fiercely denied the three murders of which he was accused. However, Zanchi admitted to being a pistol-shooter and described himself as ‘the biggest hold-up man in the region’ and a ‘great avenger’. The day after Zanchi's arrest, twenty-two other people were also arrested but released as there was no evidence against them. Zanchi was, however, overwhelmed by the confessions of the people with whom he had claimed responsibility for the murder of Gerald Crouzet. At the same time, Nepote-Cit's body was found, thanks to a phone tap Zanchi had made a few days earlier. Although he did not confess to any of the three murders of which he was accused, Zanchi did not claim to be a ‘stranger’ to the events, saying that he had ‘avenged’ his friend Jean-François André. Three days later, Zanchi is brought before the investigating judge and charged with organised first-degree murder in relation to the deaths of Gerald Crouzet and Michel Di-Bacco, then with organised second-degree murder in relation to the death of Marc Nepote-Cit, as well as illegal possession of weapons. He is remanded in pre-trial detention at Grenoble-Varces Prison.

Although Zanchi is now a serial killer—as well as a repeat offender—Jean-François André's family explains that Zanchi has always been affected by the death of his friend, whom he considered his "brother in spirit". Following his detention, Zanchi was nicknamed "The Avenger" by the press for having "cleaned" André's honour. He was also nicknamed "The Helmeted Avenger" and "The Vengeful Avenger". Described as an "old-school thug", Zanchi is known for bringing justice to his friends, whatever the risks.

=== First sentence ===
On 18 November 2010, Zanchi appeared before the Privas criminal Court for criminal conspiracy, theft, handling stolen goods and robbery, committed in 2003. In the dock, he admitted to illegally possessing weapons and receiving stolen goods, but denied embezzling money and burglarising the Phildar store, despite the discovery of several items of clothing at his home in May 2004. At the end of his trial, Zanchi was sentenced to 30 months in prison. Zanchi's five co-defendants received sentences ranging from six months' suspended imprisonment to two years' imprisonment.

On 18 September 2012, Zanchi's trial began before the Drôme Assize Court for the first-degree murders of Crouzet and Di-Bacco, as well as the second-degree murder of Nepote-Cit. He was defended by Jean-Yves Bret.

Now aged 50, Zanchi remained silent and did not explain any of the three crimes. During the trial, he was supported by his friends, his ex-wife and Jean-François André's daughter. Next came the testimony of Zanchi's three accusers: his former partner, a former friend of André's, and André's former partner. When called to testify in turn, they recanted their confessions and claimed never to have accused Zanchi. For Zanchi's defence, these retractions were welcomed as confessions of innocence. For the prosecution, however, they were considered to be fear of reprisals from Zanchi. At his trial, Zanchi was judged to be a "serial killer seeking justice for the crime". However, the court firmly refused to portray the accused as a hero, judging him to be dangerous and at high risk of reoffending. According to the jury, Zanchi's case was characterised by an "obsession with crime" in which he felt "compelled" to kill his rivals in order to "avenge" his allies.

On 21 September, Zanchi was sentenced to life imprisonment for the first-degree murders of Crouzet and Di-Bacco, as well as the second-degree murder of Nepote-Cit. He appealed against this decision.

=== Appeal ===
On 26 March 2014, Zanchi's appeal trial began before the Assize Court of Isère. He was defended by Mr Sylvain Cormier.

During his trial, Zanchi broke his silence and proclaimed his innocence. Zanchi's defence focused on the inconsistencies in his "revenge" and pointed to his late intervention. The defence argued that he could have killed Gérald Crouzet, Michel Di-Bacco and Marc Nepote-Cit as early as 2003 or 2004. Mr Cormier demonstrated that Zanchi did not return to prison until nine months after André's death, which, in his view, proved Zanchi's innocence, as Zanchi would have been incapable of waiting five years to "avenge" André. The Court, however, does not share this view and asserts that the commission of the acts is due to the dismissal of the case in 2008, reinforcing a desire to kill in order to seek "revenge".

On 28 March, Zanchi was sentenced to 30 years' imprisonment for the first-degree murders of Crouzet and Di-Bacco, as well as the second-degree murder of Nepote-Cit. Zanchi and Mr Cormier lodged an appeal with the Court of cassation, but this was rejected.

== See also ==
- List of French serial killers

== Documentaries ==
- "Revenge in the land of bikers", broadcast on June 5, 2016, on Bring in the Accused, presented by Frédérique Lantieri on France 2.
