= Akram Shammaa =

Prince Akram Shammaa Al Zengi
- Prince of Zengid Dynasty
- Prince Akram Shammaa Al Zengi Prince of Zengid Dynasty
- Predecessor: Mohammad III
- Successor: Riam Shammaa Zengi
- Born: 8 August 1930; Aleppo, Syria
- Died: 9 June 2012 (aged 81); Aleppo, Syria
- House: Zengid dynasty

Prince Akram Shammaa Al Zengi (Mohammad Akram Bin Mostafa Bin Mohammad Shammaa Al Zengi III; Arabic: محمد اكرم شماع بن مصطفى بن محمد شماع الزنكي; August 8, 1930 – June 9, 2012) was a Prince of Al Zengid Dynasty. He was a politician, lawyer and real estate investor. He was a descendant of the Zengid Dynasty that ruled Syria and parts of Iraq between 1127 and 1234

== Early life ==
Prince Akram was the second son of Mostafa Shammaa Al Zengi the 4th son Prince Mohammad Shammaa Al Zengi III. Prince Akram began his schooling at The Islamic college before going to the law school at University of Damascus, he graduated in 1964. Prince Akram was an activist in the civil rights movement and an opposition leader. He opposed the Military regimes that stamped the era of the Syrian history between the 1950s and 1970s including Adib al-Shishakli, Husni al-Za'im and Hafez al-Assad.

== Career ==
He worked as a lawyer between 1964 and 1967 when he was banned from practicing law after suing the Syrian government for seizing the family assets in 1947. Between 1971 and 1982 he worked in the textile industry in Lebanon. Afterwards he was allowed to return to Syria and since then he is working as an investor in the real estate field.

== Political career ==
In 1953 he organized and led the protests against President Adib al-Shishakli. In 1967 after the family negotiations collapsed with the Syrian government, Prince Akram filed many cases against the Syrian government dominated by Al Baath party and its prime minister Yusuf Zuaiyin, for ceasing the family assets and feudal properties that were loaned to the Islamic endowment (الاوقاف) since 1856; later on the case expanded to include suing the totalitarian government for corruption, dictatorship and extortion of Syrian citizens, he was kidnapped by the Syrian intelligence system mukhabarat and according to his own memos he was demanded to drop the cases and end the protests and in exchange for his silence and cooperation he was offered a position as a Mayor of Aleppo or the Ministry of Justice in the government. When he refused he was tortured, expelled from the Syrian bar association and exiled to Lebanon. In Lebanon he continued to be an activist in the political field and in 1971 he played a pivotal role in the preparation of the bloodless coup d'état (Corrective Revolution) bringing Hafez al-Assad to power. It was directed against a dominant ultra-leftwing faction of the party, and to some extent provoked by what Assad and his supporters saw as adventurous and irresponsible foreign policies (notably the Syrian intervention in the Black September conflict in Jordan, after which the Black September Palestinian faction was named). As a result of the coup, de facto leader Salah Jadid was ousted and the party was purged. Later, he clashed with the president's brother Rifaat al-Assad who was the head of the elite internal security forces and the 'Defence Companies' (Saraya al-Difaa) because according to him they exploited the revolution and not only it didn't lead to the elimination of the dictatorial government shaped by years of unstable military rule, and lately organized along one-party lines after the Baathist coup. But also enabled Hafez al-Assad and his surrounding elite to increase repression and secure domination of every sector of society through a vast web of police informers and agents. Under his rule, Syria turned genuinely authoritarian. He stayed in Lebanon until 1982 when the Lebanese civil war broke; he was allowed to return to Syria but was banned of practicing any political or judicial activities.

== Marriage and family ==
In 1967 he married Maysa Morjan. They have one son and two daughters. His son is Prince Riam Shammaa Al Zengi.

== Titles ==
- 13 January 1954: Prince of Zengid Dynasty.
- 6 June 1960: Head of Zengi House

== Ancestry ==
Via his Paternal grandfather, Prince Akram is descended from Prince Imad ad-Din Atabeg Zengi, Nur ad-Din Zengi, As-Salih Ismail al-Malik and Imad ad-Din Zengi II.

Akram Shammaa House of Zengi Born: 8 August 1930
Preceded by Prince Mohammad Shammaa Al-Zengi III	Prince of Zengid Dynasty	Succeeded by Prince Riam Shammaa Al-Zengi

Zengid Dynasty Coat of Arms
- Prince of Zengid Dynasty
- House: Zengid dynasty

Zengid Dynasty in Aleppo
Imad ad-Din Zengi I (1128–1146)
Nur ad-Din Mahmud (1146–1174)
As-Salih Ismail al-Malik (1174–1181)
Imad ad-Din Zengi II (1181–1183)
N/A
N/A
N/A
Ahmad Shammaa Zengi I
Mohammad Shammaa Zengi I
Taha Shammaa Zengi
Mohammad Shammaa Zengi II
Ahmad Shammaa Zengi II
Mohammad Shammaa Al Zengi III (1849–1947)
Mostafa Shammaa Zengi (1902–1991)
Akram Shammaa Zengi (1930–2012)
Riam Shammaa Zengi (1982)

== See also ==
- Zengid Dynasty
