= Giovanni Battista Zanchi =

Italian engineer and author (1515–1586)

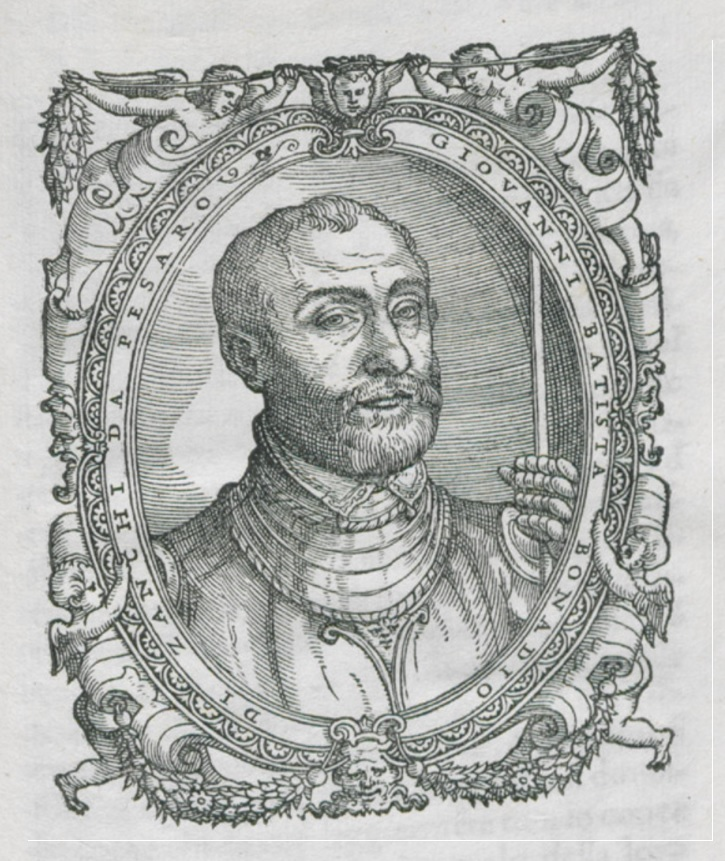
- Portrait of Giovanni Battista Zanchi
- Born: 1515; Pesaro
- Died: 1586 (aged 70–71)
- Occupations: Engineer and author

Giovanni Battista Zanchi (1515–1586) was an Italian military engineer and author.

== Life ==
Born in Pesaro in 1515 in a family originally from Bergamo, he was a captain leading 12,000 infantrymen and 500 knights for the Ottavio Farnese, Duke of Parma during the war against Protestants in Germany. He came back at home with honors, and served during the Siege of Siena under Marcantonio Colonna. In 1561 he was recruited to Cyprus, where he served as engineer with a salary of 50 ducats a month.

Zanchi wrote an influential treatise about defensive fortifications of the cities. Published in Venice, the text was translated and republished in France and England respectively by Francois de la Treille and Peter Whitehorne.
