= Mohammad Shammaa Al Zengi III =

Prince Mohammad Shammaa Zengi III (Mohammad Bin Abdullah Bin Mohammad Zengi, 1883–1954; Arabic: محمد بن عبد الله بن محمد شماع الزنكي ) was a member and prince of the Zengid Dynasty in Syria, and one of the pillars in the Syrian textile industry. He opposed the Syrian government's decision in 1947 to seize his family's assets and feudal properties that had been loaned to the Islamic endowment (الاوقاف) since 1856. He was succeeded by Prince Akram Shammaa Zengi
