= List of Kentucky High School Athletic Association championships =

The Kentucky High School Athletic Association (KHSAA) is the governing body of athletic programs for junior and senior high schools in the state of Kentucky. It conducts state championship competitions in all the KHSAA-sanctioned sports.

== Fall sports ==
=== Cross country ===
| Year | AAA | | AA | | A | |
| Year | Boys | Girls | Boys | Girls | Boys | Girls |
|---|---|---|---|---|---|---|
| 2026 | Louisville Trinity | Sacred Heart | Lexington Catholic | Lexington Catholic | Bishop Brossart | Owensboro Catholic |
| 2025 | Lafayette | Assumption | Lexington Catholic | Lexington Catholic | Louisville Collegiate | Lexington Christian |
| 2024 | Lafayette | Assumption | Covington Catholic | Lexington Catholic | Villa Madonna | Lexington Christian |
| 2023 | Louisville Trinity | Assumption | Covington Catholic | Lexington Catholic | Bishop Brossart | Beechwood |
| 2022 | Conner | Dupont Manual | North Oldham | Lexington Catholic | St. Henry | Beechwood |
| 2021 | Conner | Assumption | North Oldham | Lexington Catholic | St. Henry | Lexington Christian |
| 2020 | St. Xavier | Oldham County | North Oldham | Christian Academy-Louisville | Holy Cross (Louisville) | Bishop Brossart |
| 2019 | Louisville Trinity | Oldham County | Corbin | Scott | Holy Cross (Louisville) | Louisville Collegiate |
| 2018 | Louisville Trinity | Oldham County | Lexington Catholic | Scott | Holy Cross (Louisville) | Bishop Brossart |
| 2017 | St. Xavier | DuPont Manual | Lexington Catholic | Ft. Thomas Highlands | Holy Cross (Louisville) | Bishop Brossart |
| 2016 | St. Xavier | DuPont Manual | Lexington Catholic | Christian Academy-Louisville | Lexington Christian | St. Henry |
| 2015 | St. Xavier | Daviess County | North Oldham | Ft. Thomas Highlands | Lexington Christian | St. Henry |
| 2014 | South Oldham | Sacred Heart | North Oldham | Ft. Thomas Highlands | Bishop Brossart | St. Henry |
| 2013 | St. Xavier | Assumption | North Oldham | Ft. Thomas Highlands | Bishop Brossart | St. Henry |
| 2012 | St. Xavier | Assumption | North Oldham | Highlands | St. Henry | St. Henry |
| 2011 | St. Xavier | Assumption | North Oldham | South Oldham | St. Henry | St. Henry |
| 2010 | Louisville Trinity | Assumption | North Oldham | South Oldham | St. Henry | St. Henry |
| 2009 | St. Xavier | Sacred Heart | South Oldham | South Oldham | St. Henry | St. Henry |
| 2008 | Daviess County | Assumption | North Oldham | South Oldham | St. Henry | St. Henry |
| 2007 | DuPont Manual | Assumption | Owensboro Catholic | Bell County | St. Henry | St. Henry |
| 2006 | Louisville Trinity | DuPont Manual | Owensboro Catholic | Muhlenberg South | St. Henry | Walton-Verona |
| 2005 | St. Xavier | Paul Laurence Dunbar | Owensboro Catholic | Bell County | St. Henry | St. Henry |
| 2004 | Daviess County | Sacred Heart | Paducah Tilghman | Ft. Thomas Highlands | St. Henry | St. Henry |
| 2003 | Daviess County | Sacred Heart | Paducah Tilghman | Ft. Thomas Highlands | St. Henry | St. Henry |
| 2002 | Daviess County | Sacred Heart | Warren East | Ft. Thomas Highlands | St. Henry | Hancock County |
| 2001 | St. Xavier | Greenwood | Owensboro Catholic | Warren East | Bishop Brossart | Hancock County |
| 2000 | South Oldham | Pulaski County | Warren East | Warren East | Bishop Brossart | Frankfort |
| 1999 | St. Xavier | Daviess County | Warren East | Warren East | Bishop Brossart | Ludlow |
| 1998 | Daviess County | Scott | Green County | Western Hills | St. Mary | St. Henry |
| 1997 | Louisville Trinity | Pulaski County | Bowling Green | Western Hills | Bishop Brossart | St. Henry |
| 1996 | Louisville Trinity | Pulaski County | Bowling Green | Western Hills | St. Henry | St. Mary |
| 1995 | Daviess County | Sacred Heart | Bowling Green | Western Hills | Cordia | St. Mary |
| 1994 | St. Xavier | Sacred Heart | Covington Catholic | Western Hills | St. Henry | St. Mary |
| 1993 | Daviess County | Daviess County | South Oldham | Warren East | St. Henry | St. Henry |
| 1992 | Louisville Trinity | Pulaski County | Elizabethtown | Oldham County | Bishop Brossart | Ft. Knox |
| 1991 | Louisville Trinity | Pulaski County | Elizabethtown | Notre Dame | Bishop Brossart | Trigg County |
| 1990 | Shelby County | Notre Dame | Barren County | Ft. Campbell | Cordia | St. Henry |
| 1989 | Shelby County | Notre Dame | Ft. Campbell | Warren East | Cordia | St. Henry |
| 1988 | Louisville Trinity | Pulaski County | Ft. Campbell | Warren East | Cordia | Frankfort |
| 1987 | Pulaski County | Pulaski County | Rowan County | Danville | West Hopkins | St. Henry |
| 1986 | Louisville Trinity | Oldham County | Franklin County | Danville | Trigg County | St. Henry |
| 1985 | Louisville Trinity | Oldham County | Ft. Thomas Highlands | Danville | Dayton | Providence |
| 1984 | St. Xavier | Oldham County | Calloway County | Danville | Bishop Brossart | Lexington Catholic |
| 1983 | St. Xavier | Daviess County | Ft. Thomas Highlands | Clay County | Dayton | Lexington Catholic |
| 1982 | Daviess County | Daviess County | Covington Catholic | Danville | Ft. Campbell | Trigg County |
| 1981 | Louisville Trinity | Daviess County | Pulaski County | Pulaski County | Ft. Campbell | Providence |
| 1980 | St. Xavier | Louisville Central | Adair County | Ft. Thomas Highlands | Ft. Campbell | Ft. Campbell |
| 1979 | St. Xavier | Louisville Central | Ft. Thomas Highlands | Ft. Thomas Highlands | Model | Ft. Campbell |
| 1978 | Atherton | Atherton | Lloyd | Ft. Thomas Highlands | Somerset | Ft. Campbell |
| 1977 | Louisville Trinity | Louisville Central | Pulaski County | Daviess County | Somerset | Lexington Catholic |
| 1976 | Louisville Trinity | Waggener | Pulaski County | Daviess County | Somerset | Lexington Catholic |
| 1975 | Ballard | Pleasure Ridge Park | Lloyd | Franklin County | St. Henry | Lexington Catholic |
| 1974 | St. Xavier | | Lloyd | | West Hardin | |
| 1973 | St. Xavier | | Owensboro | | West Hardin | |
| 1972 | Ballard | | Daviess County | | Bishop Brossart | |
| 1971 | St. Xavier | | Daviess County | | | |
| 1970 | DeSales | | Owensboro | | | |
| 1969 | DeSales | | Owensboro | | | |
| 1968 | DeSales; Thomas Jefferson | | Owensboro | | | |
| 1967 | Louisville Trinity | | Owensboro | | | |
| 1966 | Louisville Trinity | | | | | |
| 1965 | Louisville Trinity | | | | | |
| 1964 | St. Xavier | | | | | |
| 1963 | St. Xavier | | | | | |
| 1962 | St. Xavier | | | | | |
| 1961 | Louisville Trinity | | | | | |
| 1960 | St. Xavier | | | | | |
| 1959 | St. Xavier | | | | | |
| 1958 | Louisville Trinity | | | | | |
| 1957 | Louisville Trinity | | | | | |
| 1956 | St. Joseph | | | | | |
| 1955 | St. Joseph | | | | | |
| 1954 | Trimble County | | | | | |
| 1953 | Breckinridge County | | | | | |

=== Field hockey ===
| Year | Champions |
|---|---|
| 2026 | Sacred Heart |
| 2025 | Sacred Heart |
| 2024 | Assumption |
| 2023 | Christian Academy-Louisville |
| 2022 | Assumption |
| 2021 | Sacred Heart |
| 2020 | Sacred Heart |
| 2019 | Assumption |
| 2018 | Sacred Heart |
| 2017 | Christian Academy-Louisville |
| 2016 | Assumption |
| 2015 | Sacred Heart |
| 2014 | Assumption |

=== Football ===
| Year | 6A | 5A | 4A | 3A | 2A | A |
|---|---|---|---|---|---|---|
| 2025 | Trinity | Owensboro | Boyle County | Christian Academy-Louisville | Lexington Christian | Kentucky Country Day |
| 2024 | Trinity | Bowling Green | Paducah Tilghman | Christian Academy-Louisville | Beechwood | Sayre |
| 2023 | Trinity | Bowling Green | Boyle County | Christian Academy-Louisville | Mayfield | Pikeville |
| 2022 | Bullitt East | Frederick Douglas | Boyle County | Christian Academy-Louisville | Beechwood | Pikeville |
| 2021 | St. Xavier | South Warren | Boyle County | Belfry | Beechwood | Pikeville |
| 2020 | Trinity | Bowling Green | Boyle County | Ashland Blazer | Beechwood | Paintsville |
| 2019 | Trinity | Covington Catholic | Johnson Central | Belfry | Somerset | Pikeville |
| 2018 | Male | South Warren | Franklin-Simpson | Central | Christian Academy-Louisville | Beechwood |
| 2017 | Trinity | Covington Catholic | Franklin-Simpson | Boyle County | Danville | Beechwood |
| 2016 | Trinity | Bowling Green | Johnson Central | Belfry | Christian Academy-Louisville | Beechwood |
| 2015 | Male | Bowling Green | South Warren | Belfry | Mayfield | Pikeville |
| 2014 | Trinity | Pulaski County | Highlands | Belfry | DeSales | Mayfield |
| 2013 | Scott County | Bowling Green | Collins | Belfry | DeSales | Mayfield |
| 2012 | Trinity | Bowling Green | Highlands | Central | Newport Central Catholic | Mayfield |
| 2011 | Trinity | Bowling Green | Highlands | Central | Covington Holy Cross | Hazard |
| 2010 | Trinity | Highlands | Boyle County | Central | Newport Central Catholic | Mayfield |
| 2009 | St. Xavier | Highlands | Boyle County | Paducah Tilghman | Fort Campbell | Lexington Christian |
| 2008 | Trinity | Highlands | Bell County | Central | Fort Campbell | Beechwood |
| 2007 | Trinity | Highlands | Lexington Catholic | Central | Fort Campbell | Beechwood |
| 2006 | | | Trinity | Covington Catholic | Mercer County | Newport Central Catholic |
| 2005 | | | Trinity | Lexington Catholic | Russell | Newport Central Catholic |
| 2004 | | | St. Xavier | Highlands | Belfry | Beechwood |
| 2003 | | | Trinity | Boyle County | Belfry | Danville |
| 2002 | | | Trinity | Boyle County | Breathitt County | Mayfield |
| 2001 | | | Trinity | Boyle County | Bardstown | Danville |
| 2000 | | | Male | Highlands | Boyle County | Danville |
| 1999 | | | St. Xavier | Highlands | Boyle County | Beechwood |
| 1998 | | | Male | Highlands | Caldwell County | Middlesboro |
| 1997 | | | St. Xavier | Covington Catholic | Bourbon County | Beechwood |
| 1996 | | | Nelson County | Highlands | Breathitt County | Beechwood |
| 1995 | | | St. Xavier | Bowling Green | Breathitt County | Mayfield |
| 1994 | | | Trinity | Covington Catholic | Danville | Beechwood |
| 1993 | | | Male | Covington Catholic | Mayfield | Beechwood |
| 1992 | | | St. Xavier | Highlands | Danville | Beechwood |
| 1991 | | | George Rogers Clark | Bell County | Danville | Beechwood |
| 1990 | | | Trinity | Paul Blazer | Fort Knox | Russellville |
| 1989 | | | Trinity | Highlands | Danville | Pikeville |
| 1988 | | | Trinity | Covington Catholic | Fort Knox | Pikeville |
| 1987 | | | Shelby County | Covington Catholic | Danville | Pikeville |
| 1986 | | | St. Xavier | Owensboro | Mayfield | Heath |
| 1985 | | | Trinity | Paducah Tilghman | Mayfield | Crittenden County |
| 1984 | | | Christian County | Danville | Newport Catholic | Beechwood |
| 1983 | | | Trinity | Conner | Fort Knox | Russellville |
| 1982 | | | Christian County | Highlands | Corbin | Paris |
| 1981 | | | Henry Clay | Highlands | Bardstown | Paris |
| 1980 | | | Trinity | Franklin-Simpson | Corbin | Russellville |
| 1979 | | | Butler | Franklin-Simpson | Fort Campbell | Bellevue |
| 1978 | | | St. Xavier | Russell | Mayfield | Fort Campbell |
| 1977 | | | Trinity | Highlands | Mayfield | Bellevue |
| 1976 | | | Trinity | Lloyd Memorial | Corbin | Fort Campbell |
| 1975 | | | St. Xavier | Highlands | Scott County | Ludlow |
| 1974 | | | | St. Xavier | Owensboro | Murray |
| 1973 | | | | Trinity | Paducah Tilghman | Paris |
| 1972 | | | | Trinity | Tates Creek | Trigg County |
| 1971 | | | | Thomas Jefferson Flaget | Bryan Station | Trigg County |
| 1970 | | | | Butler | Highlands | Bardstown |
| 1969 | | | | St. Xavier | Elizabethtown | Mt. Sterling |
| 1968 | | | | Trinity | Highlands | Lynch East Main |
| 1967 | | | | Flaget | Paul Blazer | Bardstown |
| 1966 | | | | DuPont Manual | Hopkinsville | Dayton |
| 1965 | | | | Seneca | Hopkinsville | Lloyd Memorial |
| 1964 | | | | Male | Highlands | Elkhorn City |
| 1963 | | | | Male | Caldwell County | Lynch East Main |
| 1962 | | | | St. Xavier | Danville | Versailles |
| 1961 | | | | Flaget | Highlands | Murray |
| 1960 | | | | Male | Highlands | Lynch East Main |
| 1959 | | | | DuPont Manual | Henderson | Lynch East Main |

=== Golf ===
| Year | Boys | Girls |
|---|---|---|
| 2026 | St. Xavier | Lexington Christian |
| 2025 | St. Xavier | Madison Central |
| 2024 | Madison Central | Sacred Heart |
| 2023 | Madison Central | Sacred Heart |
| 2022 | Madison Central | Madison Central |
| 2021 | Christian Academy-Louisville | Marshall County |
| 2020 | Trinity | Marshall County |
| 2019 | Taylor County | Lexington Christian |
| 2018 | Taylor County | Lexington Christian |
| 2017 | Lexington Christian | Sacred Heart |
| 2016 | St. Xavier | Sacred Heart |
| 2015 | St. Xavier | Madison Central |
| 2014 | St. Xavier | Sacred Heart |
| 2013 | West Jessamine | Sacred Heart |
| 2012 | West Jessamine | Sacred Heart |
| 2011 | Lexington Christian | Sacred Heart |
| 2010 | Lexington Christian | Green County |
| 2009 | St. Xavier | Green County |
| 2008 | St. Xavier | Glasgow |
| 2007 | Marshall County | West Jessamine |
| 2006 | Henry Clay | Central Hardin |
| 2005 | St. Mary | Central Hardin |
| 2004 | St. Xavier | Russell County |
| 2003 | Trinity | Russell County |
| 2002 | St. Xavier | Assumption |
| 2001 | St. Xavier | Paul Laurence Dunbar |
| 2000 | Paducah Tilghman | Glasgow |
| 1999 | St. Xavier | Glasgow |
| 1998 | Green County | Glasgow |
| 1997 | Bowling Green | Glasgow |
| 1996 | Bowling Green | Franklin County |
| 1995 | Daviess County | Franklin County |
| 1994 | Somerset | Somerset |
| 1993 | St. Xavier | Sacred Heart |
| 1992 | St. Xavier | North Hardin |
| 1991 | Franklin County | Madisonville-North Hopkins |
| 1990 | Trinity; Franklin County | North Hardin; Madisonville-North Hopkins |
| 1989 | Bowling Green | Henry Clay |
| 1988 | Trinity | Oldham County |
| 1987 | St. Xavier | Sacred Heart |
| 1986 | Oldham County | Sacred Heart |
| 1985 | Oldham County | Sacred Heart |
| 1984 | Covington Catholic | Sacred Heart |
| 1983 | Western Hills | Notre Dame |
| 1982 | St. Xavier | Notre Dame |
| 1981 | St. Xavier | Elizabethtown |
| 1980 | Tates Creek | Notre Dame |
| 1979 | Trinity | Notre Dame |
| 1978 | Trinity | Ballard |
| 1977 | Middlesboro | Caldwell County |
| 1976 | Doss | Ballard |
| 1975 | Doss | Ballard |
| 1974 | Bowling Green | Kentucky Country Day |
| 1973 | Bowling Green | Lafayette |
| 1972 | Paducah Tilghman | Lafayette |
| 1971 | Waggener | Waggener |
| 1970 | Russellville | Kentucky Home School |
| 1969 | Covington Catholic | Waggener |
| 1968 | St. Xavier | Campbellsville |
| 1967 | Mason County | Campbellsville |
| 1966 | St. Xavier | Frankfort |
| 1965 | St. Xavier | Owensboro |
| 1964 | Frankfort | |
| 1963 | Atherton | |
| 1962 | Frankfort | |
| 1961 | Waggerner | |
| 1960 | Trinity | |
| 1959 | Mayfield | |
| 1958 | Paintsville | |
| 1957 | St. Xavier | |
| 1956 | Kentucky Military | |
| 1955 | Eastern | |
| 1954 | St. Xavier | |
| 1953 | Clark County | |
| 1952 | St. Xavier | |
| 1951 | St. Xavier | |
| 1950 | Lafayette | |
| 1949 | Lafayette | |
| 1948 | Male | |
| 1947 | Male | |
| 1946 | Male | |
| 1945 | Male | |
| 1944 | Male | |
| 1943 | Henry Clay | |
| 1942 | Male | |
| 1941 | Male | |
| 1940 | Manual | |
| 1939 | Anchorage | |
| 1938 | Anchorage | |
| 1937 | Anchorage | |
| 1936 | Anchorage | |
| 1935 | Kentucky Military | |

=== Soccer ===
| Year | Boys | Girls |
|---|---|---|
| 2026 | St. Xavier | Central Hardin |
| 2025 | St. Xavier | Sacred Heart |
| 2024 | Henry Clay | Sacred Heart |
| 2023 | St. Xavier | Bethlehem |
| 2022 | Paul Laurence Dunbar | South Oldham |
| 2021 | Paul Laurence Dunbar | Notre Dame |
| 2020 | St. Xavier | Sacred Heart |
| 2019 | Henry Clay | Greenwood |
| 2018 | St. Xavier | Sacred Heart |
| 2017 | St. Xavier | West Jessamine |
| 2016 | Daviess County | West Jessamine |
| 2015 | Covington Catholic | Sacred Heart |
| 2014 | Bowling Green | South Oldham |
| 2013 | Paul Laurence Dunbar | Notre Dame |
| 2012 | St. Xavier | Tates Creek |
| 2011 | St. Xavier | Notre Dame |
| 2010 | Henry Clay | St. Henry |
| 2009 | St. Xavier | Sacred Heart |
| 2008 | St. Xavier | Sacred Heart |
| 2007 | St. Xavier | Sacred Heart |
| 2006 | Bowling Green | Highlands |
| 2005 | Paul Laurence Dunbar | Highlands |
| 2004 | Lexington Catholic | Notre Dame |
| 2003 | St. Xavier | Sacred Heart |
| 2002 | St. Xavier | Lexington Catholic |
| 2001 | Paul Laurence Dunbar | South Oldham |
| 2000 | St. Xavier | South Oldham |
| 1999 | Ballard | South Oldham |
| 1998 | Trinity | South Oldham |
| 1997 | St. Xavier | Ballard |
| 1996 | Eastern | South Oldham |
| 1995 | Ballard | South Oldham |
| 1994 | St. Xavier | Male |
| 1993 | Ballard | Male |
| 1992 | Paul Laurence Dunbar | Lafayette |
| 1991 | Henry Clay | |
| 1990 | Lafayette | |
| 1989 | Ballard | |
| 1988 | Tates Creek | |
| 1987 | Ballard | |
| 1986 | Ballard | |
| 1985 | Tates Creek | |
| 1984 | Trinity | |
| 1983 | Male | |
| 1982 | Ballard | |
| 1981 | Ballard | |
| 1980 | Westport | |
| 1976 | Ballard | |
| 1975 | Kentucky Country Day | |
| 1973 | St. Xavier | |
| 1972 | St. Xavier | |

=== Volleyball ===
| Year | Champions |
|---|---|
| 2026 | Assumption |
| 2025 | Assumption |
| 2024 | Assumption |
| 2023 | Assumption |
| 2022 | Notre Dame |
| 2021 | St. Henry |
| 2020 | Notre Dame |
| 2019 | Assumption |
| 2018 | Assumption |
| 2017 | Assumption |
| 2016 | Sacred Heart |
| 2015 | Assumption |
| 2014 | Mercy |
| 2013 | Assumption |
| 2012 | Assumption |
| 2011 | Assumption |
| 2010 | Assumption |
| 2009 | Mercy |
| 2008 | Mercy |
| 2007 | Assumption |
| 2006 | Assumption |
| 2005 | Assumption |
| 2004 | Assumption |
| 2003 | Sacred Heart |
| 2002 | Assumption |
| 2001 | Assumption |
| 2000 | Assumption |
| 1999 | Assumption |
| 1998 | Assumption |
| 1997 | Assumption |
| 1996 | Assumption |
| 1995 | Assumption |
| 1994 | Notre Dame |
| 1993 | Assumption |
| 1992 | Assumption |
| 1991 | Notre Dame |
| 1990 | Mercy |
| 1989 | Notre Dame |
| 1988 | Mercy |
| 1987 | Notre Dame |
| 1986 | Mercy |
| 1985 | Mercy |
| 1984 | Notre Dame |
| 1983 | Notre Dame |
| 1982 | Notre Dame |
| 1981 | St. Henry |
| 1980 | Villa Madonna |
| 1979 | Notre Dame |

== Winter sports ==
=== Basketball ===
| Year | Boys | Girls |
|---|---|---|
| 2026 | George Rogers Clark | George Rogers Clark |
| 2025 | Great Crossing | Sacred Heart |
| 2024 | Lyon County | Sacred Heart |
| 2023 | Warren Central | Sacred Heart |
| 2022 | George Rogers Clark | Sacred Heart |
| 2021 | Highlands | Sacred Heart |
| 2020 | Cancelled due to COVID-19 pandemic | |
| 2019 | Trinity | Ryle |
| 2018 | Covington Catholic | Mercer County |
| 2017 | Bowling Green | Mercer County |
| 2016 | Paul Laurence Dunbar | Butler |
| 2015 | Owensboro | Holy Cross (Covington) |
| 2014 | Covington Catholic | Butler |
| 2013 | Madison Central | Marion County |
| 2012 | Trinity | DuPont Manual |
| 2011 | Christian County | Rockcastle County |
| 2010 | Shelby Valley | Mercy |
| 2009 | Holmes | Iroquois |
| 2008 | Mason County | Butler |
| 2007 | Scott County | Lexington Christian |
| 2006 | Jeffersontown | Lexington Catholic |
| 2005 | South Laurel | Lexington Catholic |
| 2004 | Warren Central | Sacred Heart |
| 2003 | Mason County | Sacred Heart |
| 2002 | Lexington Catholic | Sacred Heart |
| 2001 | Lafayette | Lexington Catholic |
| 2000 | Elizabethtown | West Carter |
| 1999 | Ballard | Lexington Catholic |
| 1998 | Scott County | Elizabethtown |
| 1997 | Eastern | Hazard |
| 1996 | Paintsville | Union County |
| 1995 | Breckinridge County | Scott County |
| 1994 | Fairdale | M.C. Napier |
| 1993 | Marion County | Nicholas County |
| 1992 | University Heights | Mercy |
| 1991 | Fairdale | Laurel County |
| 1990 | Fairdale | Henry Clay |
| 1989 | Pleasure Ridge Park | Clay County |
| 1988 | Ballard | Southern |
| 1987 | Clay County | Laurel County |
| 1986 | Pulaski County | Oldham County |
| 1985 | Hopkinsville | Whitley County |
| 1984 | Logan County | Marshall County |
| 1983 | Henry Clay | Warren Central |
| 1982 | Laurel County | Marshall County |
| 1981 | Simon Kenton | Pulaski County |
| 1980 | Owensboro | Butler |
| 1979 | Lafayette | Laurel County |
| 1978 | Shelby County | Laurel County |
| 1977 | Ballard | Laurel County |
| 1976 | Edmonson County | Sacred Heart |
| 1975 | Male | Butler |
| 1974 | Central | Western |
| 1973 | Shawnee | Woodburn |
| 1972 | Owensboro | Woodburn |
| 1971 | Male | Hazard |
| 1970 | Male | Ashland Blazer |
| 1969 | Central | Ashland Blazer |
| 1968 | Glasgow | West Louisville |
| 1967 | Earlington | Maysville |
| 1966 | Shelby County | Georgetown |
| 1965 | Breckinridge County | Ashland Blazer |
| 1964 | Seneca | West Louisville |
| 1963 | Seneca | Ashland Blazer |
| 1962 | St. Xavier | Ashland Blazer |
| 1961 | Ashland Blazer | Paris |
| 1960 | Flaget | |
| 1959 | North Marshall | |
| 1958 | St. Xavier | |
| 1957 | Lafayette | |
| 1956 | Carr Creek | |
| 1955 | Hazard | |
| 1954 | Inez | |
| 1953 | Lafayette | |
| 1952 | Cuba | |
| 1951 | Clark County | |
| 1950 | Lafayette | |
| 1949 | Owensboro | |
| 1948 | Brewers | |
| 1947 | Maysville | |
| 1946 | Breckenridge Training | |
| 1945 | Male | |
| 1944 | Harlan | |
| 1943 | Hindman | |
| 1942 | Lafayette | |
| 1941 | Inez | |
| 1940 | Hazel Green | |
| 1939 | Brooksville | |
| 1938 | Sharpe | |
| 1937 | Midway | |
| 1936 | Corbin | |
| 1935 | St. Xavier | |
| 1934 | Ashland Blazer | |
| 1933 | Ashland Blazer | |
| 1932 | Hazard | |
| 1931 | DuPont Manual | |
| 1930 | Corinth | |
| 1929 | Heath | |
| 1928 | Ashland Blazer | |
| 1927 | Millersburg Military Institute | |
| 1926 | St. Xavier | |
| 1925 | DuPont Manual | |
| 1924 | Henry Clay | |
| 1923 | DuPont Manual | |
| 1922 | Henry Clay | |
| 1921 | DuPont Manual | |
| 1920 | Henry Clay | |
| 1919 | Henry Clay | |
| 1918 | Henry Clay | |

=== Swimming and diving ===
| Year | Boys | Girls |
|---|---|---|
| 2026 | St. Xavier | Sacred Heart |
| 2025 | St. Xavier | Sacred Heart |
| 2024 | St. Xavier | Sacred Heart |
| 2023 | St. Xavier | Sacred Heart |
| 2022 | St. Xavier | Sacred Heart |
| 2021 | St. Xavier | Sacred Heart |
| 2020 | St. Xavier | Sacred Heart |
| 2019 | St. Xavier | Sacred Heart |
| 2018 | St. Xavier | Sacred Heart |
| 2017 | St. Xavier | Sacred Heart |
| 2016 | St. Xavier | Sacred Heart |
| 2015 | St. Xavier | Sacred Heart |
| 2014 | St. Xavier | Sacred Heart |
| 2013 | St. Xavier | Sacred Heart |
| 2012 | St. Xavier | DuPont Manual |
| 2011 | St. Xavier | Sacred Heart |
| 2010 | St. Xavier | Sacred Heart |
| 2009 | St. Xavier | DuPont Manual |
| 2008 | St. Xavier | DuPont Manual |
| 2007 | St. Xavier | DuPont Manual |
| 2006 | St. Xavier | DuPont Manual |
| 2005 | St. Xavier | DuPont Manual |
| 2004 | St. Xavier | Sacred Heart |
| 2003 | St. Xavier | Sacred Heart |
| 2002 | St. Xavier | Notre Dame |
| 2001 | St. Xavier | Paul Laurence Dunbar |
| 2000 | St. Xavier | Sacred Heart |
| 1999 | St. Xavier | Sacred Heart |
| 1998 | St. Xavier | Sacred Heart |
| 1997 | St. Xavier | Sacred Heart |
| 1996 | St. Xavier | Sacred Heart |
| 1995 | St. Xavier | Sacred Heart |
| 1994 | St. Xavier | Notre Dame |
| 1993 | St. Xavier | Notre Dame |
| 1992 | St. Xavier | Elizabethtown |
| 1991 | St. Xavier | Notre Dame |
| 1990 | St. Xavier | Henry Clay |
| 1989 | St. Xavier | Notre Dame |
| 1988 | Elizabethtown | Sacred Heart |
| 1987 | St. Xavier | Sacred Heart |
| 1986 | Elizabethtown | Sacred Heart |
| 1985 | Elizabethtown | Sacred Heart |
| 1984 | Model | Sacred Heart |
| 1983 | Covington Catholic | Sacred Heart |
| 1982 | St. Xavier | Sacred Heart |
| 1981 | St. Xavier | Sacred Heart |
| 1980 | St. Xavier | Sacred Heart |
| 1979 | St. Xavier | Sacred Heart |
| 1978 | St. Xavier; Covington Catholic | Sacred Heart; Ashland Blazer |
| 1977 | St. Xavier; Covington Catholic | Ashland Blazer; Notre Dame |
| 1976 | St. Xavier; Ashland Blazer | Ballard; Notre Dame |
| 1975 | Atherton; Dixie Heights | Ballard; Villa Madonna |
| 1974 | Ballard; Covington Catholic/Highlands | Ballard; Villa Madonna |
| 1973 | Ashland Blazer; Highlands | Ballard; Notre Dame |
| 1972 | Ashland Blazer; Model | Ballard; Notre Dame |
| 1971 | Westport; Highlands | Ballard; Model |
| 1970 | Trinity; Highlands | Westport; Model |
| 1969 | Westport; Hopkinsville | Westport; Model |
| 1968 | Westport; Model | Westport; Highlands |
| 1967 | Trinity; Highlands | Westport; Highlands |
| 1966 | St. Xavier; Highlands | Westport; Highlands |
| 1965 | Westport; Highlands | Westport; Highlands |
| 1964 | Atherton; Highlands | Sacred Heart; Highlands |
| 1963 | St. Xavier; Westport | Sacred Heart |
| 1962 | St. Xavier; Covington Catholic | Lafayette |
| 1961 | St. Xavier; Highlands | |
| 1960 | St. Xavier; Highlands | |
| 1959 | Atherton; Trinity; Bellevue | |
| 1958 | Lafayette; Trinity; Waggener | |
| 1957 | St. Xavier; Highlands; St. Joseph | |
| 1956 | St. Xavier; Berea; Highlands | |
| 1955 | St. Xavier; University; Bellevue | |
| 1954 | St. Xavier; Berea Foundation; University | |
| 1953 | St. Xavier; Berea Foundation | |
| 1952 | St. Xavier; Lafayette | |
| 1951 | St. Xavier; University | |
| 1950 | St. Xavier; Berea Foundation | |
| 1949 | St. Xavier | |
| 1948 | St. Xavier | |
| 1947 | St. Xavier | |
| 1946 | Newport | |

=== Wrestling ===
| Year | Boys | Girls |
|---|---|---|
| 2026 | Union County | Lafayette |
| 2025 | Union County | Lafayette |
| 2024 | Union County | Taylor County |
| 2023 | Paducah Tilghman | |
| 2022 | Union County | |
| 2021 | Union County | |
| 2020 | Union County | |
| 2019 | Union County | |
| 2018 | Union County | |
| 2017 | Union County | |
| 2016 | Union County | |
| 2015 | Fern Creek | |
| 2014 | Union County | |
| 2013 | St. Xavier | |
| 2012 | Campbell County | |
| 2011 | Union County | |
| 2010 | Trinity | |
| 2009 | Trinity | |
| 2008 | Union County | |
| 2007 | Union County | |
| 2006 | Woodford County | |
| 2005 | Woodford County | |
| 2004 | Campbell County | |
| 2003 | South Oldham | |
| 2002 | Woodford County | |
| 2001 | St. Xavier | |
| 2000 | Woodford County | |
| 1999 | Woodford County | |
| 1998 | St. Xavier | |
| 1997 | Woodford County | |
| 1996 | Woodford County | |
| 1995 | Sheldon Clark | |
| 1994 | Sheldon Clark | |
| 1993 | Woodford County | |
| 1992 | Hopkinsville | |
| 1991 | Campbell County | |
| 1990 | Campbell County | |
| 1989 | Trinity | |
| 1988 | Christian County | |
| 1987 | Simon Kenton | |
| 1986 | Hopkinsville | |
| 1985 | Hopkinsville | |
| 1984 | Fern Creek | |
| 1983 | Conner | |
| 1982 | Union County | |
| 1981 | North Hardin | |
| 1980 | Union County | |
| 1979 | Boone County | |
| 1978 | North Hardin | |
| 1977 | Woodford County | |
| 1976 | Union County | |
| 1975 | Fern Creek | |
| 1974 | Woodford County | |
| 1973 | Woodford County | |
| 1972 | Woodford County | |
| 1971 | Fort Campbell | |
| 1970 | Woodford County | |
| 1969 | North Hardin | |
| 1968 | North Hardin | |
| 1967 | Newport Catholic | |
| 1966 | Kentucky School for the Blind | |
| 1965 | Ahrens Trade | |
| 1964 | Ahrens Trade | |

== Spring sports ==
=== Baseball ===
| Year | Champions |
|---|---|
| 2026 | Trinity (3) |
| 2025 | Trinity (2) |
| 2024 | Pleasure Ridge Park (7) |
| 2023 | Whitley County |
| 2022 | St. Xavier (9) |
| 2021 | Trinity (1) |
| 2020 | Cancelled due to COVID-19 pandemic |
| 2019 | Tates Creek (4) |
| 2018 | St. Xavier (8) |
| 2017 | Pleasure Ridge Park (6) |
| 2016 | St. Xavier (7) |
| 2015 | West Jessamine |
| 2014 | St. Xavier (6) |
| 2013 | Pleasure Ridge Park (5) |
| 2012 | Woodford County |
| 2011 | Central Hardin |
| 2010 | Harrison County (4) |
| 2009 | Lexington Catholic (3) |
| 2008 | Pleasure Ridge Park (4) |
| 2007 | Paul Laurence Dunbar (2) |
| 2006 | Lexington Catholic (2) |
| 2005 | Lexington Christian |
| 2004 | Christian County |
| 2003 | Paul Laurence Dunbar (1) |
| 2002 | Covington Catholic (1) |
| 2001 | Boyd County (1) |
| 2000 | Henderson County (1) |
| 1999 | Lexington Catholic (1) |
| 1998 | Harrison County (3) |
| 1997 | Harrison County (2) |
| 1996 | Pleasure Ridge Park (3) |
| 1995 | Pleasure Ridge Park (2) |
| 1994 | Pleasure Ridge Park (1) |
| 1993 | Harrison County (1) |
| 1992 | Lafayette (3) |
| 1991 | Franklin-Simpson |
| 1990 | Paintsville |
| 1989 | Lafayette (2) |
| 1988 | Lafayette (1) |
| 1987 | Owensboro (6) |
| 1986 | Tates Creek (3) |
| 1985 | Owensboro Catholic |
| 1984 | East Carter |
| 1983 | Owensboro (5) |
| 1982 | Madison Central |
| 1981 | St. Xavier (5) |
| 1980 | Tates Creek (2) |
| 1979 | Shelby County |
| 1978 | Tates Creek (1) |
| 1977 | Owensboro (4) |
| 1976 | Owensboro (3) |
| 1975 | Elizabethtown (2) |
| 1974 | Somerset |
| 1973 | Henry Clay |
| 1972 | Caverna (2) |
| 1971 | Daviess County |
| 1970 | Elizabethtown (1) |
| 1969 | Owensboro (2) |
| 1968 | Ashland Blazer (3) |
| 1967 | Ashland Blazer (2) |
| 1966 | Ashland Blazer (1) |
| 1965 | Bowling Green |
| 1964 | Owensboro (1) |
| 1963 | Holmes |
| 1962 | DuPont Manual (6) |
| 1961 | Caverna (1) |
| 1960 | Paducah Tilghman |
| 1959 | DuPont Manual (5) |
| 1958 | Maysville |
| 1957 | Dupont Manual (4) |
| 1956 | Newport Central Catholic (4) |
| 1955 | DuPont Manual (3) |
| 1954 | Newport Central Catholic (3) |
| 1953 | St. Joseph |
| 1952 | DuPont Manual (2) |
| 1951 | St. Xavier (4) |
| 1950 | Newport Central Catholic (2) |
| 1949 | St. Xavier (3) |
| 1948 | Prestonsburg |
| 1947 | DuPont Manual (1) |
| 1946 | Newport Central Catholic (1) |
| 1945 | St. Xavier (2) |
| 1944 | Male |
| 1942 | St. Xavier (1) |
| 1941 | Newport (2) |
| 1940 | Newport (1) |

=== Softball ===
| Year | Champions |
|---|---|
| 2026 | South Warren |
| 2025 | Assumption |
| 2024 | Henderson County |
| 2023 | Ballard (2) |
| 2022 | Ballard (1) |
| 2021 | Butler |
| 2020 | Cancelled due to COVID-19 pandemic |
| 2019 | Male |
| 2018 | Scott County (3) |
| 2017 | Madisonville-North Hopkins |
| 2016 | Scott County (2) |
| 2015 | McCracken County |
| 2014 | Scott County (1) |
| 2013 | Greenwood (3) |
| 2012 | Mercy |
| 2011 | Allen County-Scottsville |
| 2010 | Reidland (3) |
| 2009 | Owensboro Catholic (5) |
| 2008 | Greenwood (2) |
| 2007 | Greenwood (1) |
| 2006 | Ryle |
| 2005 | Owensboro Catholic (4) |
| 2004 | Calloway County |
| 2003 | Owensboro Catholic (3) |
| 2002 | Reidland (2) |
| 2001 | North Laurel |
| 2000 | DuPont Manual (2) |
| 1999 | Owensboro Catholic (2) |
| 1998 | Owensboro Catholic (1) |
| 1997 | DuPont Manual (1) |
| 1996 | Christian County |
| 1995 | Reidland (1) |

=== Tennis ===
| Year | Boys | Girls |
|---|---|---|
| 2026 | St. Xavier | Sacred Heart |
| 2025 | Covington Catholic | DuPont Manual |
| 2024 | Covington Catholic | Sacred Heart |
| 2023 | Covington Catholic | Sacred Heart |
| 2022 | St. Xavier | Sacred Heart |
| 2021 | St. Xavier | Sacred Heart |
| 2020 | Cancelled due to COVID-19 pandemic | |
| 2019 | Trinity | Sacred Heart |
| 2018 | St. Xavier | Sacred Heart |
| 2017 | St. Xavier | McCracken County |
| 2016 | St. Xavier | McCracken County |
| 2015 | St. Xavier | McCracken County |
| 2014 | St. Xavier | Sacred Heart |
| 2013 | St. Xavier | Sacred Heart |
| 2012 | St. Xavier | Lone Oak |
| 2011 | St. Xavier | Assumption |
| 2010 | St. Xavier | Notre Dame |
| 2009 | St. Xavier | Lone Oak |
| 2008 | DuPont Manual | Sacred Heart |
| 2007 | St. Xavier | Sacred Heart |
| 2006 | Trinity | Lexington Christian |
| 2005 | St. Xavier | Lexington Christian |
| 2004 | St. Xavier | Paul Laurence Dunbar |
| 2003 | St. Xavier | Lone Oak |
| 2002 | St. Xavier | Lexington Christian |
| 2001 | St. Xavier | Lone Oak |
| 2000 | St. Xavier | Lone Oak |
| 1999 | St. Xavier | Lone Oak |
| 1998 | St. Xavier | Notre Dame |
| 1997 | St. Xavier | Notre Dame |
| 1996 | St. Xavier | Lone Oak |
| 1995 | Ballard | Lone Oak |
| 1994 | St. Xavier | Lone Oak |
| 1993 | Trinity | Lone Oak |
| 1992 | Trinity | Lone Oak |
| 1991 | Trinity | Sacred Heart |
| 1990 | St. Xavier | Sacred Heart |
| 1989 | St. Xavier | Sacred Heart |
| 1988 | St. Xavier | Sacred Heart |
| 1987 | St. Xavier | Sacred Heart |
| 1986 | Trinity | Henry Clay |
| 1985 | Sayre | Sayre |
| 1984 | Henderson | Sayre |
| 1983 | St. Xavier | Sayre |
| 1982 | St. Xavier | Tates Creek |

=== Track and field ===
| Year | AAA | | AA | | A | |
| Year | Boys | Girls | Boys | Girls | Boys | Girls |
|---|---|---|---|---|---|---|
| 2026 | Male | Oldham County | Covington Catholic | Calloway County | Beechwood | Lexington Christian |
| 2025 | Trinity | Assumption | Covington Catholic | Lexington Catholic | Louisville Collegiate | Lexington Christian |
| 2024 | St. Xavier | Dupont Manual | Covington Catholic | Lexington Catholic | Beechwood | Beechwood |
| 2023 | St. Xavier | Dupont Manual | Mercer County | Lexington Catholic | Walter-Verona | Beechwood |
| 2022 | St. Xavier | Dupont Manual | Mercer County | Mercer County | Fort Knox | Bishop Brossart |
| 2021 | St. Xavier | DuPont Manual | Mercer County | Christian Academy-Louisville | Holy Cross (Louisville) | Bishop Brossart |
| 2020 | Cancelled due to COVID-19 pandemic | | | | | |
| 2019 | St. Xavier | Tates Creek | Boyle County | Mercer County | Holy Cross (Louisville) | Beechwood |
| 2018 | Trinity | Male | Boyle County | Boyle County | Danville | St. Henry |
| 2017 | Male | Male | Mercer County | Boyle County | Fort Knox | Murray |
| 2016 | Henry Clay | Male | Mercer County | Boyle County | Lexington Christian | Murray |
| 2015 | Henry Clay | Bryan Station | Paducah Tilghman | North Oldham | Bishop Brossart | St. Henry |
| 2014 | North Hardin | Bryan Station | Highlands | North Oldham | Fort Knox | St. Henry |
| 2013 | North Hardin | North Hardin | Lexington Catholic | Central | Fort Campbell | St. Henry |
| 2012 | Bryan Station | Assumption | Paducah Tilghman | Western Hills | St. Henry | St. Henry |
| 2011 | Male | Sacred Heart | North Oldham | Highlands | Holy Cross (Louisville) | Newport Central Catholic |
| 2010 | Male | Campbell County | Central | Highlands | Fort Campbell | Newport Central Catholic |
| 2009 | Male | Owensboro | Covington Catholic | Highlands | Fort Campbell | Newport Central Catholic |
| 2008 | Male | Ballard | Paducah Tilghman | Highlands | Bardstown | St. Henry |
| 2007 | Male | Owensboro | Paducah Tilghman | Paducah Tilghman | Bishop Brossart | St. Henry |
| 2006 | Trinity | Eastern | Paducah Tilghman | Paducah Tilghman | Bardstown | St. Henry |
| 2005 | Trinity | Assumption; Paul Laurence Dunbar | Paducah Tilghman | Paducah Tilghman | Bardstown | St. Henry |
| 2004 | North Hardin | Sacred Heart | Paducah Tilghman | Paducah Tilghman | Bardstown | St. Henry |
| 2003 | St. Xavier | Henderson County | Paducah Tilghman | Paducah Tilghman | Raceland | Fort Knox |
| 2002 | St. Xavier | Ballard | Paducah Tilghman | Paducah Tilghman | Bishop Brossart | Bishop Brossart |
| 2001 | St. Xavier | Ballard | Paducah Tilghman | Paducah Tilghman | Murray | Bishop Brossart |
| 2000 | North Hardin | Ballard | Fort Campbell | Paducah Tilghman | Bishop Brossart | Bishop Brossart |
| 1999 | Daviess County | North Hardin | Union County | Russell | St. Henry | Bishop Brossart |
| 1998 | Male | Eastern | Union County | Western Hills | Harrodsburg | Bishop Brossart |
| 1997 | Daviess County | Eastern | Union County | Russell | Harrodsburg | Bishop Brossart |
| 1996 | Male | Eastern | Fort Campbell | Western Hills | St. Henry | St. Henry |
| 1995 | Male | Valley | Fort Campbell | Fort Campbell | Trigg County | Dayton |
| 1994 | Male | Valley | Elizabethtown | Russell | Harrodsburg | Providence |
| 1993 | St. Xavier | Henry Clay | Paducah Tilghman | Paducah Tilghman | Bellevue | Providence |
| 1992 | North Hardin | Valley | Paducah Tilghman | Fort Campbell | Bellevue | Dayton |
| 1991 | St. Xavier | George Rogers Clark | Fort Knox | Fort Campbell | Bellevue | Todd County Central |
| 1990 | Eastern | Ballard | Fort Campbell | Fort Campbell | Danville | Todd County Central |
| 1989 | Henderson County | Pulaski County | Paducah Tilghman | Fort Knox | Danville | Frankfort |
| 1988 | Henderson County | Bryan Station | Paducah Tilghman | Fort Campbell | Danville | Danville |
| 1987 | Paducah Tilghman | Bryan Station | Fort Knox | Danville | Bardstown | Providence |
| 1986 | Paducah Tilghman | Owensboro; Seneca | Fort Knox | Danville | Bardstown | Bellevue |
| 1985 | Lafayette | Eastern | Paducah Tilghman | Danville | Fort Knox | Bath County |
| 1984 | Shelby County | Ballard | Paducah Tilghman | Danville | Fort Knox | Bellevue |
| 1983 | Bryan Station | Ballard | Paducah Tilghman | Danville | Trigg County | Trigg County |
| 1982 | Bryan Station | Bryan Station | Paducah Tilghman | Ballard | Trigg County | Fort Campbell |
| 1981 | Bryan Station | Bryan Station | Paducah Tilghman | Danville | Trigg County | Fort Campbell |
| 1980 | Bryan Station | Boyd County | Paducah Tilghman | Paducah Tilghman | Harrodsburg | Fort Campbell |
| 1979 | Bryan Station | Bryan Station | Paducah Tilghman | Paducah Tilghman | Fort Campbell | Fort Campbell |
| 1978 | Trinity | Central | Lafayette | Bryan Station | Trigg County | Madison |
| 1977 | Valley | Ballard | Paducah Tilghman | Bryan Station | Bardstown | Harrodsburg |
| 1976 | Valley | Butler | Paducah Tilghman | Bryan Station | Paris | Harrodsburg |
| 1975 | DuPont Manual | DuPont Manual | Bryan Station | Paducah Tilghman | Russellville | Fort Campbell |
| 1974 | St. Xavier | Ballard | Owensboro | Paducah Tilghman | Paris | Trigg County |
| 1973 | Thomas Jefferson | Eastern | Tates Creek | Paducah Tilghman | Williamsburg | Fort Campbell |
| 1972 | Male | Male | Paducah Tilghnan | Franklin County | Bath County | Harlan; Trigg County |
| 1971 | Male | Eastern | Bryan Station | Franklin County | Bardstown | Lexington Catholic |
| 1970 | Male | Eastern | Lafayette | Christian County | Bardstown | Frankfort |
| 1969 | Male | Eastern | Paducah Tilghman | Christian County | Frankfort | |
| 1968 | Male | Male | Paducah Tilghman | | Bellevue | |
| 1967 | Male | Owensboro | Newport Central Catholic | | Bellevue | |
| 1966 | Male | Male | Paducah Tilghman | | Millersburg Military | |
| 1965 | Owensboro | | | | | |
| 1964 | Lafayette | | | | | |
| 1963 | Lafayette; St. Xavier | | | | | |
| 1962 | DuPont Manual | | | | | |
| 1961 | Flaget | | | | | |
| 1960 | DuPont Manual | | | | | |
| 1959 | Highlands | | | | | |
| 1958 | Central | | | | | |
| 1957 | St. Xavier | | | | | |
| 1956 | Valley | | | | | |
| 1955 | Ashland Blazer | | | | | |
| 1954 | Lafayette | | | | | |
| 1953 | Lafayette | | | | | |
| 1952 | Male | | | | | |
| 1951 | St. Xavier | | | | | |
| 1950 | St. Xavier | | | | | |
| 1949 | Male | | | | | |
| 1948 | Male | | | | | |
| 1947 | Male | | | | | |
| 1946 | Male | | | | | |
| 1945 | Male | | | | | |
| 1944 | DuPont Manual | | | | | |
| 1943 | Male | | | | | |
| 1942 | Male | | | | | |
| 1941 | Newport | | | | | |
| 1940 | DuPont Manual | | | | | |
| 1939 | DuPont Manual | | | | | |
| 1938 | DuPont Manual | | | | | |
| 1937 | DuPont Manual | | | | | |
| 1936 | Male | | | | | |
| 1935 | DuPont Manual | | | | | |
| 1934 | DuPont Manual | | | | | |
| 1933 | DuPont Manual | | | | | |
| 1932 | Male | | | | | |
| 1931 | DuPont Manual | | | | | |
| 1930 | DuPont Manual | | | | | |
| 1929 | Male | | | | | |
| 1927 | Male | | | | | |
| 1926 | DuPont Manual | | | | | |
| 1925 | DuPont Manual | | | | | |
| 1924 | Male | | | | | |
| 1923 | Male | | | | | |
| 1922 | Berea Academy | | | | | |
| 1921 | Male | | | | | |
| 1920 | Highlands | | | | | |

== See also ==
- List of high schools in Kentucky
- Kentucky High School Athletic Association
