= Mr. Football (Kentucky) =

Sports award

The Kentucky Mr. Football award is an honor given to the top high school football player in the state of Kentucky and in the KHSAA. Awarded by a panel of sports writers and broadcasters from around the state's Associated Press, many past winners have proceeded to have successful college careers and even play in the National Football League (NFL).

== Award winners ==
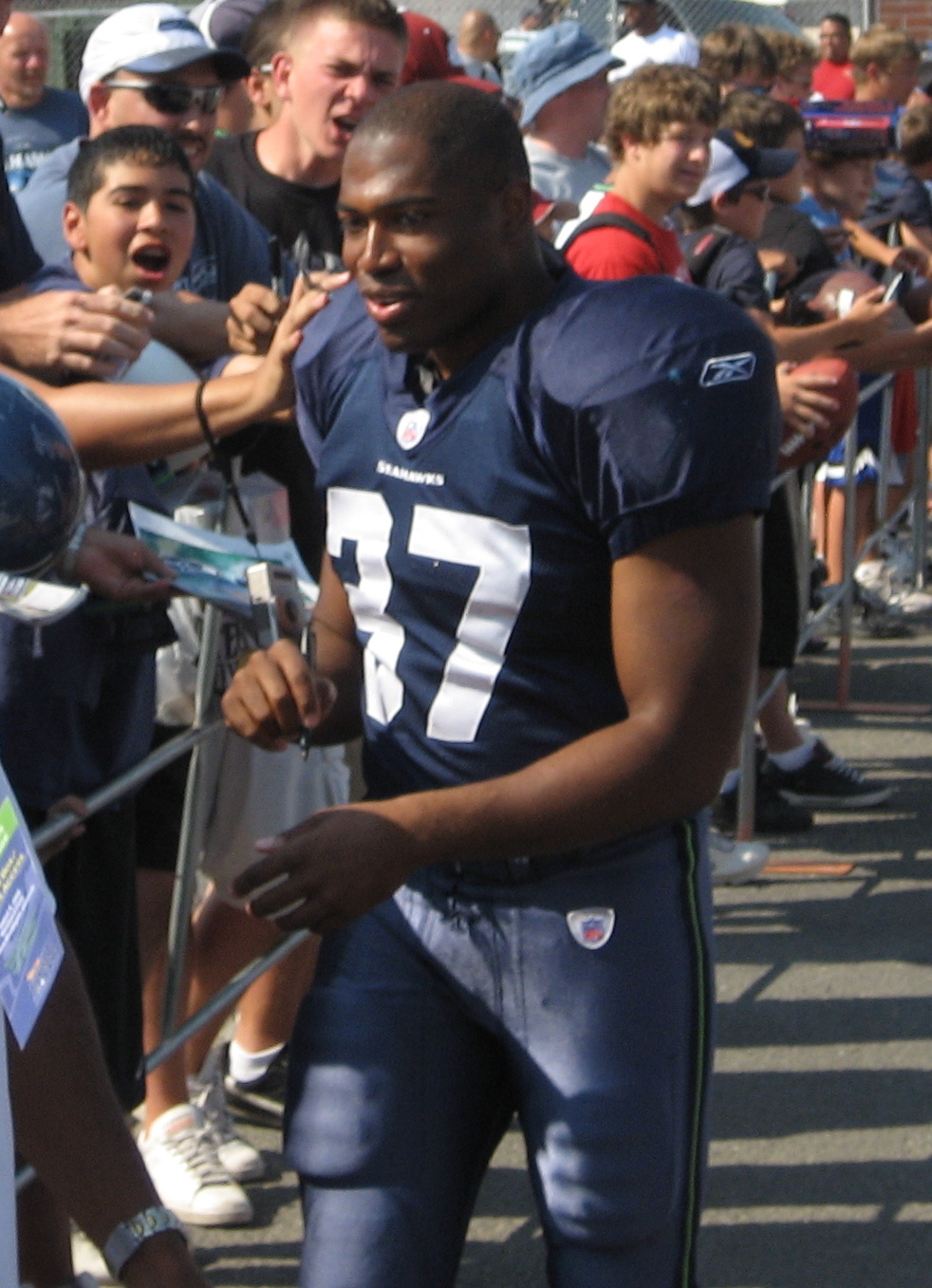
Shaun Alexander was 1994's Mr. Football from Boone County.

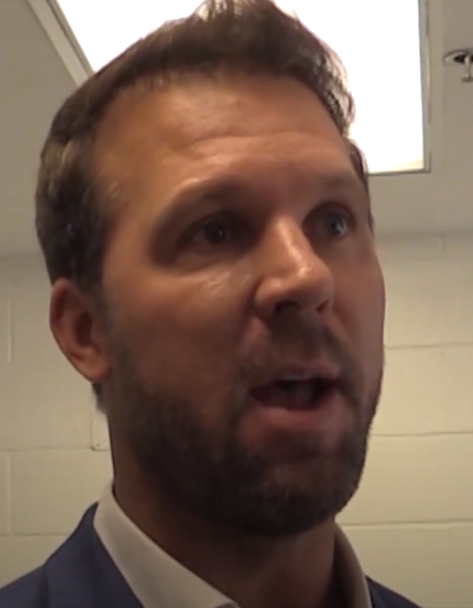
Tim Couch was 1995's Mr. Football from Leslie County.

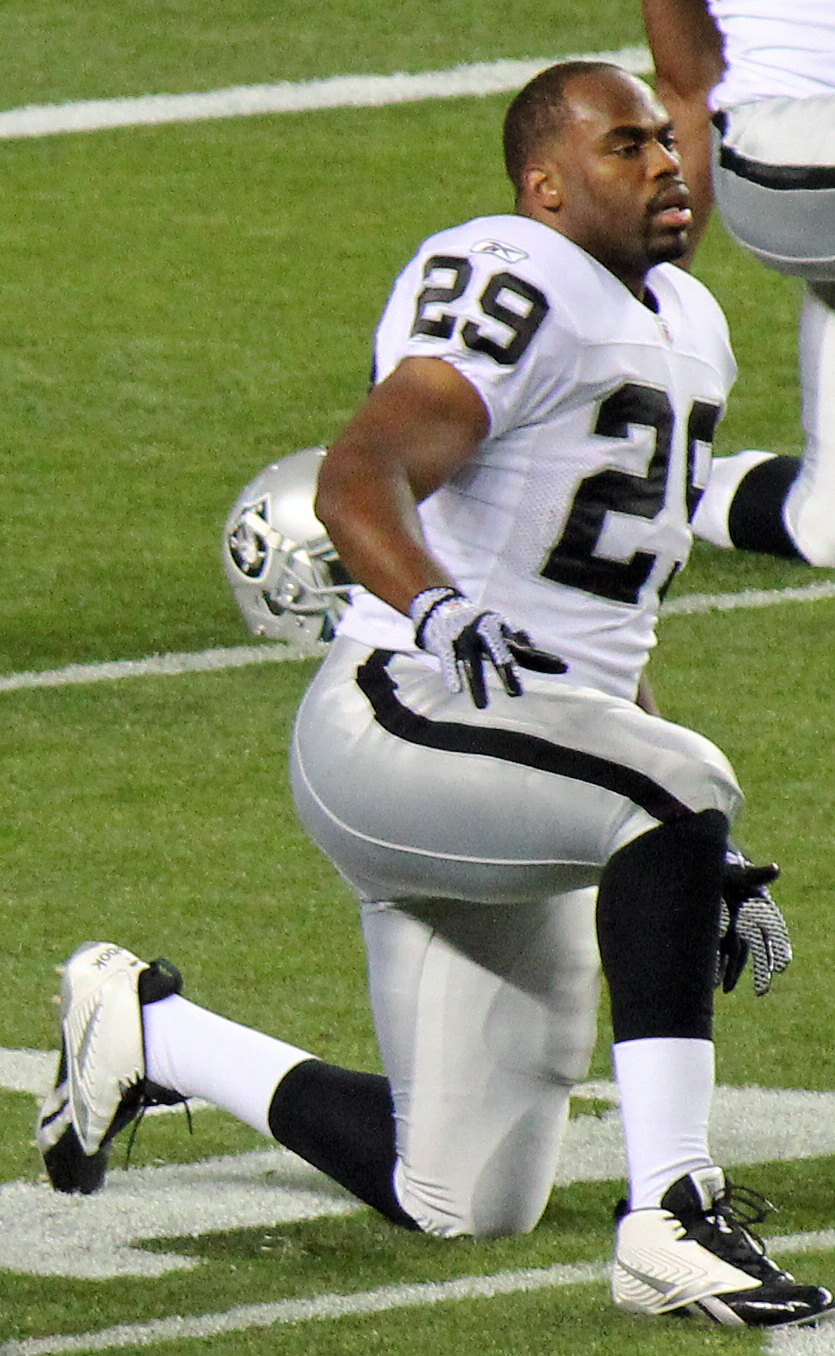
Michael Bush was 2002's Mr. Football from Male.

Year	Player	High school	College	NFL draft	Ref.
1986	Frank Jacobs	Newport Central Catholic	Notre Dame		
1987	Kurt Barber	Paducah Tilghman	USC	1992 NFL draft: 2nd round, 42nd overall by the New York Jets	
1988	Jeff Brohm	Trinity	Louisville		
1989	Pookie Jones	Calloway County	Kentucky		
1990	Damon Hood	Warren Central	Kentucky		
1991	Scott Russell	Evarts	Lees-McRae; Union		
1992	Billy Jack Haskins	Paducah Tilghman	Kentucky; Rhode Island		
1993	Jeremy Simpson	Lincoln County	Cumberland (KY)		
1994	Shaun Alexander	Boone County	Alabama	2000 NFL draft: 1st round, 19th overall by the Seattle Seahawks	
1995	Tim Couch	Leslie County	Kentucky	1999 NFL draft: 1st round, 1st overall by the Cleveland Browns	
1996	Derek Homer	Fort Knox	Kentucky		
1997	Dennis Johnson	Harrodsburg	Kentucky	2002 NFL draft: 3rd round, 98th overall by the Arizona Cardinals	
1998	Jared Lorenzen	Highlands	Kentucky		
1999	Travis Atwell	Hancock County	Toledo; Kentucky		
2000	Montrell Jones	Male	Tennessee; Louisville		
2001	Jeffery Duggins	Boyle County	Alfred State		
2002	Michael Bush	Male	Louisville	2007 NFL draft: 4th round, 100th overall by the Oakland Raiders	
2003	Brian Brohm	Trinity	Louisville	2008 NFL draft: 2nd round, 56th overall by the Green Bay Packers	
2004	Curtis Pulley	Hopkinsville	Kentucky; Florida A&M		
2005	Micah Johnson	Fort Campbell	Kentucky		
2006	Douglas Beaumont	Male	Louisville		
2007	Corey Robinson	Lone Oak	Troy		
2008	Rolandan Finch	St. Xavier	Boston College		
2009	Antonio Andrews	Fort Campbell	Western Kentucky		
2010	Lamar Dawson	Boyle County	USC		
2011	Patrick Towles	Highlands	Kentucky; Boston College		
2012	James Quick	Trinity	Louisville		
2013	Nacarius Fant	Bowling Green	Western Kentucky		
2014	Elijah Sindelar	Caldwell County	Purdue		
2015	Kash Daniel	Paintsville	Kentucky		
2016	Jamale Carothers	Bowling Green	Navy; Western Kentucky		
2017	D'mauriae VanCleave	Danville	Wofford		
2018	Wan'Dale Robinson	Western Hills	Nebraska; Kentucky	2022 NFL draft: 2nd round, 43rd overall by the New York Giants	
2019	Michael Mayer	Covington Catholic	Notre Dame	2023 NFL draft: 2nd round, 35th overall by the Las Vegas Raiders	
2020 (tie)	Cameron Hergott	Beechwood	Eastern Kentucky		
2020 (tie)	Jager Burton	Frederick Douglass	Kentucky		
2021	Isaac Dixon	Belfry	Kentucky		
2022	Travis Egan	Bullitt East	Louisville		
2023	Daniel Thomas	Bell County	UVA Wise		
2024	Montavin Quisenberry	Boyle County	Kentucky		
2025	Evan Hampton	Owensboro	Vanderbilt		

=== Schools with multiple winners ===
School	Number of Awards	Years
Trinity	3	1988, 2003, 2012
Male	3	2000, 2002, 2006
Boyle County	3	2001, 2010, 2024
Bowling Green	2	2013, 2016
Highlands	2	1998, 2011
Fort Campbell	2	2005, 2009
Paducah Tilghman	2	1987, 1992

=== Colleges with multiple winners ===
College	Number of Awards	Years
Kentucky	16	1989, 1990, 1992, 1995, 1996, 1997, 1998, 1999, 2004, 2005, 2011, 2015, 2018, 2020, 2021, 2024
Louisville	7	1988, 2000, 2002, 2003, 2006, 2012, 2022
Notre Dame	2	1986, 2019
Western Kentucky	2	2009, 2013
Boston College	2	2008, 2011
USC	2	1987, 2010

== See also ==
- List of Kentucky Mr. Basketball award winners
