= Christian County High School =

Coordinates: 36°48′36.1974″N 87°28′21.543″W

Location
- 1 Tiger Way; Hopkinsville, Kentucky 42240

Information
- Type: Public high school
- Established: 1959
- School district: Christian County Public Schools
- Executive Principal: Ken Carver
- Grades: 9 - 12
- Website: Christian County High School

Christian County High School is a four-year public high school located in Hopkinsville, Kentucky with over 1,000 students. It is operated by the Christian County Public Schools school district.

== History ==
In September 1959, five high schools around the county, including Pembroke, Crofton, Lacy, Sinking Fork and South Christian were consolidated into Christian County High School in order to offer more educational opportunities. In 1967, Attucks High School, which had been Hopkinsville's first school for Black students, was incorporated into Christian County High School and transformed into a middle school. In 1971, the high school became part of the Christian County Public Schools school district after both the city and county schools were consolidated into the system.

In August 2021, Christian County Public Schools Board voted to consolidate Christian County High School, Hopkinsville High School and Gateway Academy to a College & Career Academy High School (formerly named Hopkinsville–Christian County Academy, now changed to Christian County High School). The planned opening of the school is the Fall semester of 2026, with the Hopkinsville High School closing the same semester. The new school is expected to open with 1,950 students on the new 86 acre facility, with over 100 classrooms totalling over 350,000 square feet.

== Athletics ==
Christian County High School competes in the Kentucky High School Athletic Association. From 1959 until 2026, the original school mascot was the Colonel, and the school colors were red, white, and blue. In the Fall semester of 2026, the current school mascot was introduced, which is the Tiger, and the school colors are orange, black, and blue.

The CCHS boys basketball team has made three appearances in the KHSAA Sweet 16 tournament, losing the title game to Edmonson County and Lexington Catholic in 1976 and 1979, respectively. In 2011, they won the state title, defeating Rowan County in overtime.

== Notable people ==
- Raymond Burse, American college administrator
- Anthony Hickey, basketball player
- Brice Long, American country music singer-songwriter
- Tony McCombs, American football player
- Keith Tandy, American football player and coach (born 1989)
- John Tilley, politician
- Cory Trice, American football player (born 2000)
- Chris Whitney, American basketball player
