= West Paducah, Kentucky =

Unincorporated community in Kentucky, United States

West Paducah
- Unincorporated community
- Location within the state of Kentucky West Paducah (the United States)
- Coordinates: 37°04′59″N 88°44′39″W
- Country: United States
- State: Kentucky
- County: McCracken County
- Elevation: 361 ft (110 m)
- Time zone: UTC-6 (Central (CST))
  - Summer (DST): UTC-5 (CDT)
- Zip: 42086
- Area codes: 270 & 364
- GNIS feature ID: 506464

West Paducah is an unincorporated community in McCracken County, Kentucky, United States. Its elevation is 361 feet (110 m).

== History ==
A mass shooting occurred at Heath High School in West Paducah on December 1, 1997. Fourteen-year-old Michael Carneal opened fire on a group of praying students, killing three and injuring five more.

== Government and infrastructure ==
The United States Postal Service operates the West Paducah Post Office along U.S. Route 60.

West Paducah is also the location of National Weather Service forecast office that serves Paducah and its surrounding area.

== Education ==
McCracken County Public Schools operates public schools. Schools include Heath Elementary School, Heath Middle School, and Heath High School.

== Notable natives ==
- Julian Carroll, Governor of Kentucky

== Climate ==
The climate in this area is characterized by hot, humid summers and generally mild to cool winters. According to the Köppen Climate Classification system, West Paducah has a humid subtropical climate, abbreviated "Cfa" on climate maps.
