= Reidland High School =

Former public high school in Reidland, Kentucky, United States

Coordinates: 37.0175°N 88.5354°W

Reidland High School was a public secondary school (grades 9–12) located in Paducah, Kentucky. Its mascot was the Greyhound, and its school colors were red and white. The school closed in 2013 with the consolidation of the three high schools in the McCracken County Public Schools (MCPS) district into a new McCracken County High School.

== State champions ==
- Girls Golf: 1996, 1997 (Individual: Susan Loyd)
- Girls Tennis Singles: Jackie Trail (1994, 1995)
- Softball: 1995, 2002, 2010
- 1997 KAPOS Cheerleading State Champions

== Notable alumni ==
- Michael Adams, Kentucky politician
- Trevor Mann, professional wrestler best known as Ricochet, and in Lucha Underground as Prince Puma
