= Curtis Pulley =

American football player (born 1986)

Profile
- Position: Quarterback

Personal information
- Born: December 19, 1986 (age 39); Laurens, South Carolina, U.S.
- Listed height: 6 ft 4 in (1.93 m)
- Listed weight: 200 lb (91 kg)

Career information
- High school: Hopkinsville (Hopkinsville, Kentucky)
- College: Kentucky (2005–2007) Florida A&M (2008–2010)
- NFL draft: 2011: undrafted

Awards and highlights
- MEAC Offensive player of the Year (2009); 2× First-team All-MEAC (2008, 2009); 2006 Music City Bowl; 2004 Kentucky Mr. Football

Curtis Pulley (born December 19, 1986) is an American former football quarterback for the Florida A&M University Rattlers. Pulley used to be a quarterback and wide receiver for the University of Kentucky Wildcats. He was selected as the 2004 Kentucky Mr. Football.

== Early life ==
Pulley was born on December 19, 1986, in Laurens, South Carolina. He moved to Kentucky when he was in the first grade. As a four-year letterman and three-year starter at quarterback and safety at Hopkinsville High School, his career passing statistics were 379 completions in 737 attempts for 6,016 yards and 62 touchdowns. His rushing totals include 487 attempts for 3,043 yards and 54 touchdowns. As a defensive back, he accounted for 155 tackles, 10 interceptions (two returned for touchdowns), two fumble recoveries (one for touchdown), and 13 pass breakups.

In 2004, Pulley was named Kentucky's Mr Football.

== College career ==
After holding the starting position for the Kentucky Wildcats football coming out of Spring Camp in 2006, QB Andre Woodson beat him for the spot in the fall. For the 2006 season, Pulley served as the backup quarterback, occasional wide receiver, and special teams kick blocker for the Wildcats. He left the team for the spring semester 2007, but later re-enrolled for the Fall. He decided to redshirt the 2007 season and try to regain the starting spot in 2008. He was considered one of the top athletes on the team, and at 6'4 212 lbs, can play either receiver or Quarterback.

On August 5, 2008, Curtis Pulley was dismissed from the Kentucky Wildcat football team as a result of marijuana charges and an arrest for traffic charges including speeding, driving on a suspended or revoked license and having expired or no plates or registration papers.

Pulley has since transferred to Florida A&M University. He was named MEAC Offensive Player of the Year in 2009.

Preceded by Brian Brohm	Kentucky Mr. Football; 2004	Succeeded by Micah Johnson
