= J. D. Harmon =

American football player (born 1994)

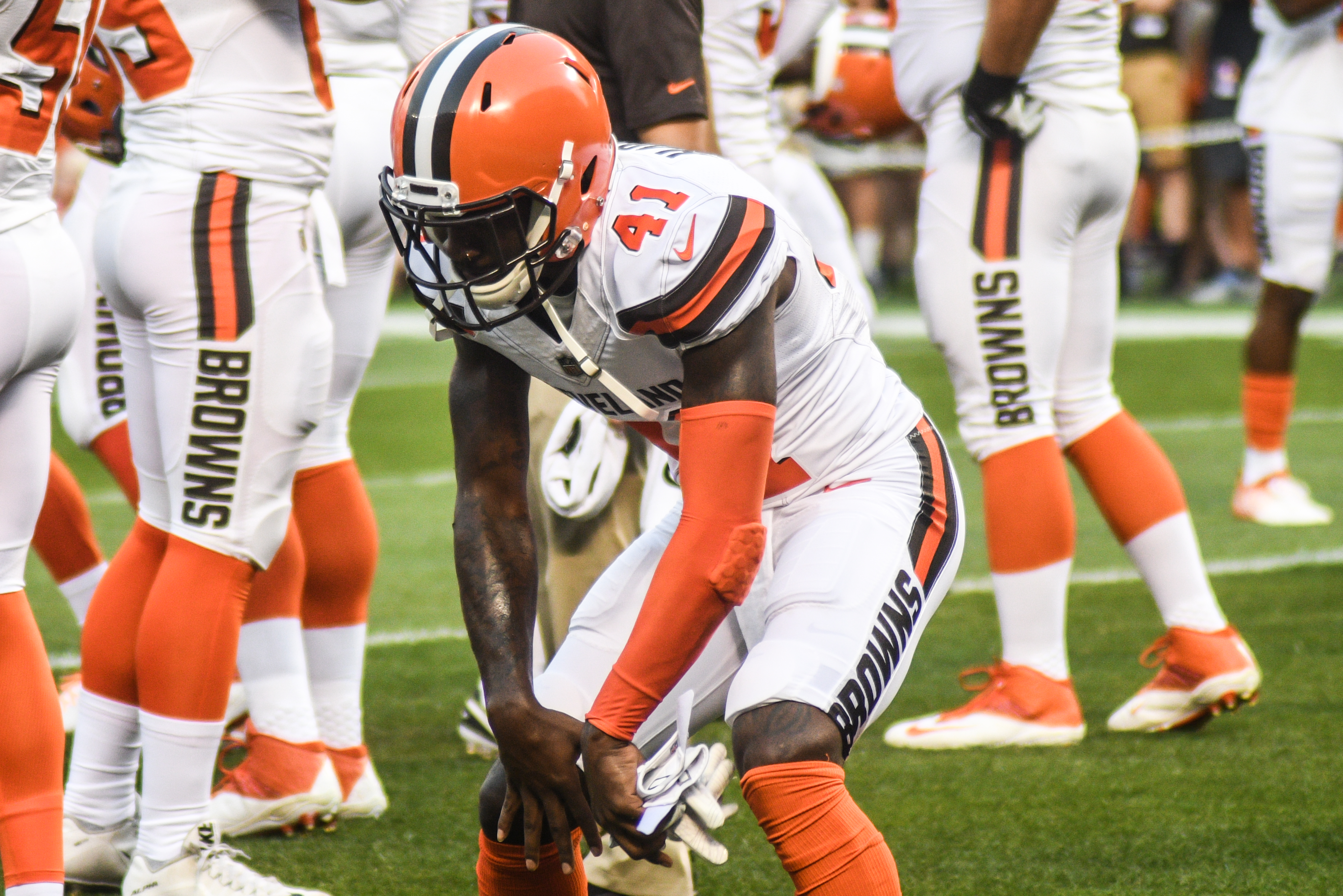
- Harmon with the Cleveland Browns in 2017

Profile
- Position: Safety

Personal information
- Born: January 18, 1994 (age 32); Paducah, Kentucky, U.S.
- Listed height: 6 ft 2 in (1.88 m)
- Listed weight: 200 lb (91 kg)

Career information
- High school: Paducah Tilghman
- College: Kentucky
- NFL draft: 2017: undrafted

Career history
- Cleveland Browns (2017)*
- * Offseason or practice squad member only

Jadarion Johntavian (born January 18, 1994), better known as J. D. Harmon, is an American former football safety. He signed with the Cleveland Browns as an undrafted free agent in 2017. He played college football at Kentucky.

== Professional career ==
Harmon signed with the Cleveland Browns as an undrafted free agent on May 4, 2017. He was waived on 1 September 2017 during roster cutdowns.
