= Bryan Hall (gridiron football) =

American football player (born 1988)

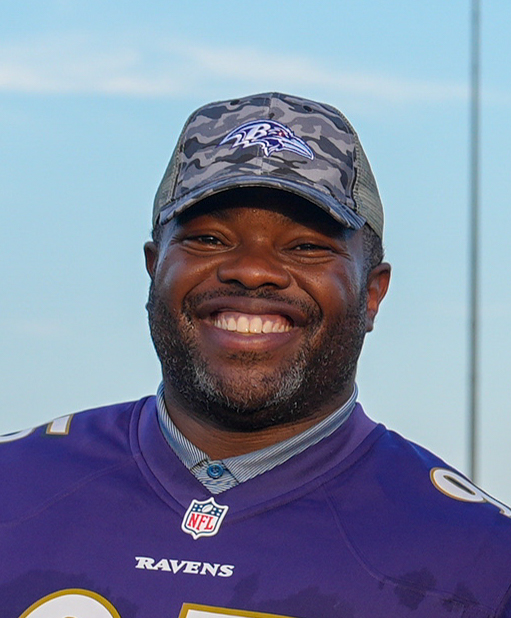
- Hall in 2025

No. 95, 92
- Positions: Defensive tackle, linebacker

Personal information
- Born: September 12, 1988 (age 38); Carbondale, Illinois, U.S.
- Listed height: 6 ft 0 in (1.83 m)
- Listed weight: 280 lb (127 kg)

Career information
- High school: Paducah Tilghman (Paducah, Kentucky)
- College: Arkansas State (2006–2010)
- NFL draft: 2011: undrafted

Career history
- Baltimore Ravens (2011–2012); Hamilton Tiger-Cats (2014–2015); Toronto Argonauts (2016); Calgary Stampeders (2017)

Awards and highlights
- Super Bowl champion (XLVII); First-team All-Sun Belt (2010); Second-team All-Sun Belt (2009)

Career NFL statistics
- Tackles: 3
- Stats at Pro Football Reference

Career CFL statistics
- Tackles: 106
- Sacks: 12
- Stats at CFL.ca

Bryan Hall (born September 12, 1988) is an American former professional football player who was a defensive tackle and linebacker in the National Football League (NFL) and Canadian Football League (CFL). He played college football for the Arkansas State Red Wolves. Hall signed with the NFL's Baltimore Ravens as an undrafted free agent in 2011, winning Super Bowl XLVII the following year, and was also a member of the CFL's Hamilton Tiger-Cats, Toronto Argonauts, and Calgary Stampeders.

== Early life ==
Hall attended Tilghman High School in Paducah, Kentucky, where he was a four-year letterman and played linebacker in his junior and senior years.

== College career ==
Hall played four years at Arkansas State University. He finished with 124 tackles, 16 sacks, 4 forced fumbles and an interception.

In 2007 (freshman year), he finished the season with 10 tackles.

In 2008, (sophomore year), he was selected as the team's Most Improved Defensive player at the end of spring camp. He finished the season with 39 tackles, 6 sacks and an interception. On August 30, 2008, he recorded 5 tackles and a sack against Texas A&M as Arkansas State won the game, 18–14.

In 2009 (junior year), he was selected to the Second-team All-Sun Conference. He finished the year with 30 tackles and 2.5 sacks. On September 5, 2009, he recorded 4 tackles and 1.5 sacks against Mississippi Valley State as Arkansas State won in a blowout, 61–0. On September 26, 2009, he had 3 tackles and a sack against Troy but Arkansas State lost, 30–27.

In 2010 (senior year), Hall finished the season with 45 tackles, 8.5 sacks and 3 forced fumbles. On September 11, 2010, he had a 4 tackles and a sack against Louisiana-Lafayette as Arkansas State lost the game, 31–24. On September 18, 2010, in a regular-season game against Louisiana-Monroe in which he had 3 tackles and 1.5 sacks as Arkansas State won, 34–20. On October 2, 2010, he had 5 tackles and a sack against Louisville but Arkansas State lost the game, 34–24. On October 23, 2010, he had 6 tackles and 2 sacks against Florida Atlantic as Arkansas State won, 37–16. On November 2, 2010, in a regular-season game against Middle Tennessee State in which he had 7 tackles, a sack and 2 forced fumbles as Arkansas State got the victory, 51–24.

== Professional career ==
=== Baltimore Ravens ===
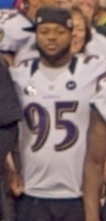
Hall with the Baltimore Ravens in Super Bowl XLVII, 2013

On July 28, 2011, he signed with the Baltimore Ravens. On September 3, 2011, he was waived. On September 4, 2011, he re-signed with the team to join the practice squad. On September 1, 2012, he officially made the 53 man roster. On October 21, 2012, he made his debut along with his teammate DeAngelo Tyson against the Houston Texans.

Before the 2013 season, Hall was moved from defensive end to inside linebacker. On August 25, 2013, he was waived by the Ravens.

=== Hamilton Tiger-Cats ===
Hall signed with the Hamilton Tiger-Cats (CFL) on May 31, 2014. In his first year in the CFL, he contributed 35 tackles and 4 sacks. Statistically, Hall had a similar 2015 season, compiling 35 tackles and 3 sacks.

=== Toronto Argonauts ===
Hall signed with the Toronto Argonauts (CFL) in February 2016. In 17 games he contributed 33 tackles, 4 quarterback sacks and 1 forced fumble. Following the season he was not re-signed by the Argos and became a free agent on February 14, 2017.

=== Calgary Stampeders ===
Bryan Hall signed with the Calgary Stampeders (CFL) on March 16, 2017.
