= Edward G McFarland =

American physician and professor (born 1956)

- Born: July 28, 1956 (age 70); Paducah, Kentucky, U.S.
- Education: University of Louisville School of Medicine (1982)
- Medical career
- Profession: Physician, professor

Edward G McFarland (born July 28, 1956) is the Wayne H. Lewis Professor of Shoulder Surgery in the Department of Orthopaedic Surgery at the Johns Hopkins School of Medicine. He specializes in the treatment of the shoulder.

== Education ==
McFarland was born on July 28, 1956, in Paducah, KY. He attended Clark Elementary School, Brazelton Junior High School and then Paducah Tilghman High School, where he was team captain for the 1973 State Championship football team, and was selected first team All-State in football as a defensive back by the Louisville Courier Journal.

He attended Murray State University where he lettered four years in football as a defensive safety, and he was All-Ohio Valley Conference first team his sophomore, junior and senior years. He went to the University of Louisville School of Medicine, graduating in 1982. He did his orthopedic residency at The Mayo Clinic in Rochester, MN, and performed a sports medicine fellowship at The Kerlan-Jobe Clinic in Inglewood, CA.

== Medical career ==
He was appointed assistant professor in orthopaedic surgery at the University of Florida, and was also a team physician for the University of Florida baseball, volleyball, track, tennis and swim teams. He left in 1992 to go to The Johns Hopkins University Department of Orthopaedic Surgery in Baltimore, MD where he began the Division of Sports Medicine and Shoulder Surgery.

He was a consulting team physician for the Baltimore Orioles from 1992 to 2014. He was a traveling fellow for the Austria-Switzerland-Germany (ASG) fellowship of the American Orthopaedic Association, for the American Orthopaedic Society for Sports Medicine and for the American Shoulder and Elbow Surgeons. He began the Division of Shoulder Surgery at Hopkins in 2003. He was promoted to full professor in 2015. He published the first book dedicated exclusively to examination of the shoulder (Examination of the shoulder: The Complete Guide. Thieme Press) in 2005. He became the Wayne H Lewis Professor of Shoulder Surgery in 2007. He was the President of the Association of Bone and Joint Surgeons in 2011–2012.

== Awards ==
- (1988) All-Time Football Honoree, Ohio Valley Conference
- (1991) 3M Young Investigator Award, Brown H, McFarland EG, Indelicato PA, “Patellofemoral Pain after ACL Reconstruction,” AOSSM Annual Meeting, Sun Valley, Idaho
- (1994) 3M Young Investigator Award, Volk CP, McFarland EG, Campbell KR, Silberstein CE, “Kinetic Analysis of Pitching in Little League and Professional Baseball Players” AOSSM Annual Meeting, Palm Desert, CA
- (1995) Inductee, Murray State University Athletic Hall of Fame
- (2000) Traveling Fellow, 2000 Austrian, Swiss, German Exchange Traveling Fellowship of The American Orthopaedic Association
- (2000) Traveling Fellow, 2000 European Exchange Traveling Fellowship of the American Orthopaedic Society for Sports Medicine
- (2000) Fellow, American College of Sports Medicine
- (2001) Traveling Fellow, American Shoulder and Elbow Surgeons
- (2001) Board of Trustee Member, American College of Sports Medicine
- (2003–2004) Election to the American College of Sports Medicine Administrative Board
- (2007–2008) President, Maryland Orthopedic Association
- (2008) “Top Doc”, Baltimore Magazine, Baltimore MD
- (2007–2009) Second Vice-president, the American College of Sports Medicine.
- (2012–2013) President, Association of Bone and Joint Surgeons
- (2017) Caduceus Society, The Johns Hopkins University
