= Christian County Public Schools =

School district in Kentucky, United States

Location
- Kentucky; United States

District information
- Type: Public
- Grades: PK–12
- School board: Erin Westerfield; Ambrea Watkins; Rebecca Pepper; Lindsey Clark; Tom Bell
- Chair of the board: Tom Bell
- NCES District ID: 2101150

Students and staff
- Students: 8161 (2025–2026)
- Staff: 514 (2025–2026)

Other information
- Website: www.christian.kyschools.us

Christian County Public Schools is the public school system of Christian County, Kentucky, United States. After many of the high schools in the area were consolidated in 1959, the city and county schools were consolidated with the formation of the school district in 1971. As of the 2025–2026 year, there were 8161 students and 514 FTE classroom teachers.

There are seven elementary schools serving preschoolers through fifth graders, two middle schools serving sixth through eighth graders, and two high schools serving ninth through twelfth graders. There are also some alternative schools including a program for students in the Kentucky Department of Juvenile Justice system.

In August 2021, Christian County Public Schools Board voted to consolidate Christian County High School, Hopkinsville High School and Gateway Academy to a College & Career Academy High School (formerly named Hopkinsville–Christian County Academy, now changed to Christian County High School). The planned opening of the school is the Fall semester of 2026, with Christian County High School and Hopkinsville High School closing the same semester.

== Elementary ==
- Crofton Elementary School (Crofton)
- Freedom Elementary School (Hopkinsville), established 2015
- Indian Hills Elementary School (Hopkinsville)
- Millbrooke Elementary School (Hopkinsville)
- Pembroke Elementary School (Pembroke)
- Sinking Fork Elementary School (Hopkinsville)
- South Christian Elementary School (Herndon)

== Middle ==
- Hopkinsville Middle School (Hopkinsville)
- Christian County Middle School (Hopkinsville)

== High ==
- Christian County High School (Hopkinsville)

== Alternative ==
- Bluegrass Learning Academy (Hopkinsville, grades 6–12)
- Christian County Day Treatment Center (Hopkinsville, grades 9–12)
- Cumberland Hall School at Cumberland Hall Hospital (Hopkinsville)
- Virtual Learning Academy (grades 4–12)

== Former schools ==
- Belmont Elementary School
  - Building was completed in 1960
  - closed in 2015
- Holiday Elementary School
  - established in 1970
  - closed in 2015
- Lacy Elementary School
  - opened as Lacy School in 1939
  - served as a high school with diplomas up to 1959
  - school burned and was rebuilt twice: 1945 and 1971
  - closed in 2015
- North Drive Middle School
  - established in 1988
  - closed in 2015, converted into an elementary school the same year
- Martin Luther King Jr Elementary School
  - Building was completed in 2006, established in 2007
  - closed in 2024
- Morningside Elementary School
  - established in 1955
  - closed in 2007
- Highland Elementary School
  - established in 1958
  - closed in 2007
- Hopkinsville High School
  - opened as Clay Street School in 1881
  - rebuilt in 1910 - 1912, renamed to Hopkinsville High School
  - rebuilt again around 1962 - 1963
  - closed in 2026
- Gateway Academy to Innovation and Technology
  - established in 2014
  - closed in 2026
