= McCracken County High School =

Location
- 6530 New Highway 60 West; Paducah, Kentucky 42001; 37.067592°N 88.734808°W

Information
- School type: Public
- Founded: 2013
- School district: McCracken County Public Schools
- Superintendent: Josh Hunt
- Principal: Jonathan Smith
- Faculty: 106.60 FTEs
- Grades: 9–12
- Enrollment: 1,999 (2022–2023)
- Student to teacher ratio: 18.75
- Campus: Suburban
- Colors: Crimson, black and white
- Mascot: Mustangs
- Nickname: Mustangs
- Feeder schools: Heath Middle School; Lone Oak Middle School; Reidland Middle School
- Website: School website

McCracken County High School is a public secondary school (grades 9–12) located west of Paducah, Kentucky that opened on August 9, 2013. Operated by the McCracken County Public Schools district, it consolidates that district's three former high schools—Heath, Lone Oak, and Reidland. Before ground was broken for the new school in June 2010, the school's nickname of Mustangs and colors of crimson, black, and white had been finalized. The school opened with an enrollment of slightly under 1,900.

Consolidation plans began taking shape in the mid-2000s due to signs of overcrowding at some of the existing high schools. Residents of the county school district (the Paducah school district, which includes most of the city's population, did not participate in the consolidation) voted in November 2008 to approve the new high school. The original opening date for the school was August 2012, but it was delayed because all of the bids for construction came in above the originally planned budget.

The school was originally (2013–2024) organized into a house system, a common feature at schools in many Commonwealth countries but rare in the U.S. Each student was assigned to one of five houses, each with its own principal, guidance counselor, and teachers. Most core courses were taught in the student's own house; electives could be taught in any part of the building. Now (24-25 onward) it uses the traditional American high school system of counselors assigned to grades, and the former houses are now organized by subject (ex. House 5 is "freshman academy" where all freshman core classes are housed).

As of the 2021–22 school year, the school had an enrollment of 2,030 students and 113 classroom teachers (on an FTE basis), for a student–teacher ratio of 18:1. There were 815 students (37% of enrollment) eligible for free lunch and 67 (3% of students) eligible for reduced-cost lunch.

== Athletics ==
- Boys Bowling: 2021 State Champions
- Girls Tennis: 2015, 2016, 2017 State Champions
- Softball: 2015 State Champions
- Coed Cheer: 2017, 2019, 2021, 2022, 2023 State Champions; 2014, 2017, 2018, 2019, 2023 UCA Medium Varsity Coed National Champions; 2021 UCA Large Varsity Coed National Champions
- Dance team: 2019 State Champions
