= Keith Tandy =

American football player and coach (born 1989)

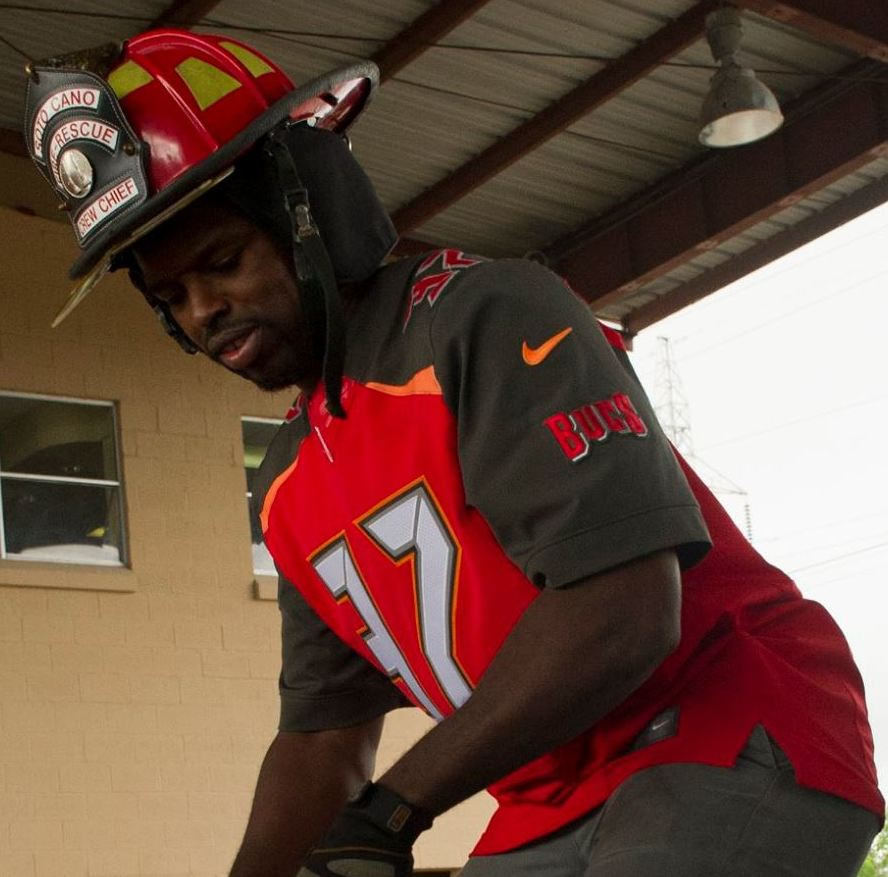
- Tandy in 2016

Cleveland Browns
- Title: Assistant special teams coach

Personal information
- Born: February 12, 1989 (age 37); Hopkinsville, Kentucky, U.S.
- Listed height: 5 ft 10 in (1.78 m)
- Listed weight: 205 lb (93 kg)

Career information
- Position: Safety (No. 37, 35)
- High school: Christian County (Hopkinsville)
- College: West Virginia
- NFL draft: 2012: 6th round, 174th overall pick

Career history

Playing
- Tampa Bay Buccaneers (2012–2017); Atlanta Falcons (2018)

Coaching
- Tampa Bay Buccaneers (2020–2025) Assistant special teams coach; Cleveland Browns (2026–present) Assistant special teams coach

Awards and highlights
- Super Bowl champion (LV); 2× First-team All-Big East (2010, 2011)

Career NFL statistics
- Total tackles: 179
- Sacks: 1
- Forced fumbles: 1
- Pass deflections: 14
- Interceptions: 8
- Stats at Pro Football Reference

Jordan Keith Tandy (born February 12, 1989) is an American professional football coach and former player who is the assistant special teams coach for the Cleveland Browns of the National Football League (NFL). He played in the NFL as a safety. Tandy played college football for the West Virginia Mountaineers and was selected by the Buccaneers in the sixth round of the 2012 NFL draft.

== Early life ==
Tandy attended Christian County High School in Hopkinsville, Kentucky. While there he played quarterback. For his career, he passed for 8,609 yards and 90 touchdowns. As a senior, he rushed for 1,007 yards and intercepted four passes on defense.

== College career ==
Tandy then attended West Virginia University (WVU) where he majored in forensic and investigative sciences.

He redshirt his freshman year. In 2008, as a redshirt freshman, he appeared in six games, recording six tackles (four solo). In 2009 as a redshirt sophomore, he started all 13 games, recording 61 tackles (43 solo), four tackles-for-loss and three interceptions. His interceptions tied for 10th in the Big East with three interceptions and 14th with seven passes defensed.

In 2010 as a redshirt junior, he started all 13 games, recording 57 tackles (38 solo), two tackles-for-loss, six interceptions, 11 passes defensed and one forced fumble. For the season, he was finished 10th in the nation in interceptions, and first in the Big East. He was also named Second-team All-American by SI.com and Third-team All-American by Rivals.com. As a redshirt senior in 2011, he started all 13 games, recording 64 tackles (50 solo), two tackles-for-loss, four interceptions and nine passes defensed. His four interceptions led the team and ranked third in the Big East. While at West Virginia he was also a three-time Big East academic All-Star.

== Professional career ==
Pre-draft measurables
Height	Weight	40-yard dash	10-yard split	20-yard split	20-yard shuttle	Three-cone drill	Vertical jump	Broad jump	Bench press
5 ft 10 1/4 in (1.78 m)	197 lb (89 kg)	4.51 s	1.49 s	2.57 s	4.29 s	6.91 s	35 in (0.89 m)	10 ft 0 in (3.05 m)	16 reps
All values from West Virginia's Pro Day

=== Tampa Bay Buccaneers ===
Tandy was selected in the sixth round (174th overall) in the 2012 NFL draft by the Tampa Bay Buccaneers. On May 10, 2012, he signed his four-year rookie contract.

As a rookie in 2012, Tandy appeared in nine games. He recorded three tackles. In 2013, he appeared in all 16 games, starting five. He recorded 40 tackles (31 solo), three passes defensed, three interceptions, one forced fumble and one fumble recovery. In 2014, he appeared in 15 games. He recorded eight tackles, one pass defensed and one interception. In 2015, he appeared in 14 games with two starts. He recorded 42 tackles (28 solo), one sack and one pass defensed.

On March 8, 2016, Tandy re-signed with the Buccaneers. In his first start of the season in Week 13 against the Chargers, Tandy picked off Philip Rivers in the end zone with 2:50 left on the clock to seal the Buccaneers' 28–21 win. The following week against the New Orleans Saints, Tandy once again had a game-winning interception on fourth down with less than a minute on a clock to seal the Buccaneers' 16–11 win.

On March 14, 2018, Tandy signed a two-year contract extension with the Buccaneers. On September 1, Tandy was released by the Buccaneers.

=== Atlanta Falcons ===
On September 10, 2018, Tandy was signed by the Atlanta Falcons. He was waived by the Falcons on December 4.

== Career statistics ==
=== NFL ===
Year	Team	GP/GS	Tackles				Sacks	Pass defense		Fumbles		Safeties	TDs
Year	Team	GP/GS	Solo	Ast	Total	TFL	No	Int	PD	FF	FR	Safeties	TDs
2012	TB	9 / 0	3	0	3	0	0	0	0	0	0	0	0
2013	TB	16 / 5	31	9	40	--	0	3	3	1	1	0	0
2014	TB	15 / 0	8	0	8	--	0	1	1	0	0	0	0
2015	TB	14 / 2	24	14	38	--	1	0	1	0	0	0	0
2016	TB	16 / 5	41	11	52	--	0	4	9	0	1	0	0
2017	TB	14 / 3	14	4	18	--	0	0	0	0	0	0	0
Career		84 / 15	118	38	156	--	1	8	14	1	2	0	0

=== College ===
Year	Team	GP/GS	Tackles				Sacks	Pass defense		Fumbles		Safeties	TDs
Year	Team	GP/GS	Solo	Ast	Total	TFL	No	Int	PD	FF	FR	Safeties	TDs
2007	WVU	0 / 0	--	--	--	--	--	--	--	--	--	--	--
2008	WVU	6 / 0	4	2	6	0	0	0	0	0	0	0	0
2009	WVU	13 / 13	43	18	61	4	0	3	0	0	0	0	0
2010	WVU	13 / 13	38	19	57	2	0	6	11	1	0	0	0
2011	WVU	13 / 13	50	14	64	2	0	4	9	0	0	0	0
Career		45 / 40	135	53	188	8	0	13	20	2	0	0	0

== Coaching career ==
In 2019, Tandy coached high school football at Bishop McLaughlin Catholic High School in Pasco County, Florida, before returning to the Tampa Bay Buccaneers in 2020 as an assistant special teams coach. He helped win Super Bowl LV with the Buccaneers against the Kansas City Chiefs in the 2020 season.

On March 3, 2026, the Cleveland Browns hired Tandy as their assistant special teams coach.

== Personal life ==
Tandy is the son of Joyce Jordan. While playing for the Buccaneers, he has helped numerous charities as well as helped support the United States Armed Forces troops. While at West Virginia, he was roommates with teammate and fellow future Tampa Bay Buccaneers 2012 draft pick Najee Goode.
