= Heath High School (Kentucky) =

Former public high school in West Paducah, Kentucky, United States

Location
- 4330 Metropolis Lake Road; West Paducah, Kentucky 42086; United States; 37.078665°N 88.793389°W

Information
- Established: 1910
- Closed: 2013
- School district: McCracken County Public Schools
- Principal: John Reid
- Teaching staff: 35.9 (FTE) (as of 2007-08)
- Grades: 9-12
- Enrollment: 534 (2012–13)
- Student to teacher ratio: 17.9 (as of 2007-08)
- Campus type: Rural
- Colors: Black and Gold
- Athletics: KHSAA
- Team name: Pirates
- Website: web.archive.org/*/http://www.mccrackencountyschools.org/Heath/HHS/home.htm%20mccrackencountyschools.org/Heath/HHS/home.htm

Heath High School was a secondary school operated by the McCracken County Public Schools district in the rural community of West Paducah, unincorporated McCracken County, Kentucky, near the largest city in the state's far-western Purchase region, Paducah. Established in 1910, the school served students in grades 9–12. It closed in June 2013 in advance of the August opening of a new McCracken County High School, which consolidates Heath, Reidland and Lone Oak High Schools.

== Campus ==
The school shared a campus with Heath Middle School. Heath Elementary School was and still is located across the road. The Heath High School building now houses Heath Middle School and the old Heath Middle is now the Alternative school for the entire school district.

=== Extracurricular activities ===
Student groups and activities at Heath High School included 4-H, book club, concert and marching band, choir, drama club, environmental club, FBLA, FCCLA, FFA, Fellowship of Christian Athletes, fitness club, Friends of Rachel, Frisbee, Habitat for Humanity, National Honor Society, pep club, SADD, Spanish club, student council, and yearbook.

=== 1997 shooting ===
At approximately 7:14 a.m on December 1, 1997, fourteen-year old Micheal Carneal, armed with a rifle, shotgun and a Ruger pistol, shot eight students while at a prayer meeting, fatally killing three. Carneal then surrendered to the principal and was sentenced to life in prison with the possibility of parole after 25 years.

== Athletics ==
The school's sports teams, known as the Heath Pirates, competed as members of the Kentucky High School Athletic Association. The football, cross country, and track teams competed in enrollment Class 2A (the KHSAA divides schools into enrollment-based classes in those three sports only). Teams were also fielded in baseball, basketball, cheerleading, golf, soccer, softball, swimming, tennis, and volleyball.

State championship titles held by the school's teams include:

- 1929 Kentucky Boys Basketball State Champions
- Football: 1986 (A)
- Boys Baseball All A State Champs: 2004
- Girls Softball All A State Champs: 2005 & 2009

== Notable alumni ==
- Julian Carroll, former Governor of Kentucky (1974–1979)
- Steven Curtis Chapman, musician
- Betty Karnette, former California State Assemblymember
- Stephen Vaughn, Acting United States Trade Representative, 2017
- Daniel Webb, former relief pitcher for the Chicago White Sox
