= Lone Oak High School (Kentucky) =

Former public high school in Paducah, Kentucky

Coordinates: 37.03701°N 88.66791°W

Location
- 225 College Ave, Paducah KY; Paducah, Kentucky 42001

Information
- School type: Public
- Established: 1919
- Closed: 2013
- School district: McCracken County Public Schools
- Grades: 9–12
- Enrollment: 897 (2012–13)
- Campus: Small city
- Colors: Purple and gold
- Nickname: Purple Flash
- Newspaper: News Flash Oak-K
- Yearbook: Oak Leaves
- Feeder schools: Lone Oak Middle School

Lone Oak High School was a public secondary school (grades 9–12) located in the city of Paducah, within unincorporated McCracken County, Kentucky. The school's nickname was Purple Flash, and its colors were purple and gold. In the school's final years, some groups (such as the marching band and football team) had begun using purple with black rather than gold. The school closed in 2013 with the consolidation of the three high schools in the McCracken County Public Schools (MCPS) district into a new McCracken County High School. Lone Oak's enrollment in its final school year of 2012–13 was approximately 900 students.

== School system ==
Before the opening of McCracken County High, Lone Oak High School was one of four public high schools in McCracken County, the most populous county of the state's westernmost region, the Jackson Purchase. Lone Oak, Heath and Reidland High Schools were operated by MCPS, while Paducah Tilghman High School is operated by the Paducah Public Schools, which did not participate in the consolidation.

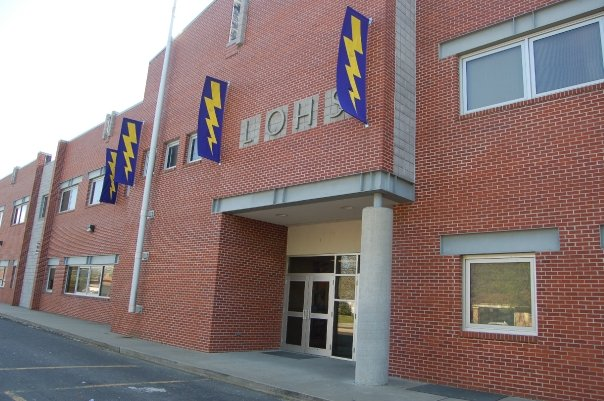
Lone Oak High School

== History ==
Lone Oak almost became the site of the first McCracken County High School, which was founded in 1910 by Professor Joe Ragsdale. But, in the face of all kinds of odds, Professor Ragsdale founded the county school at Heath; at first students attended classes out of doors, under some trees. Lone Oak High School succeeded Kentucky Western School in 1919 in the white frame building that was remodeled and stuccoed after Ragsdale set up the county school at Heath. But Lone Oak High School continued in the old college building until it burned in the mid-1920s when Miles Meredith, still living in Paducah, was principal. The first Lone Oak High School (in the "college" building) had three rooms and a hall downstairs and four rooms upstairs. One room was used as a chapel. In it Lone Oak Methodist Church was organized; Mrs. Ava McKinney Sanderson (Mrs L. E. Sanderson) was a charter member. In 1928, recalls Mrs. McCarty, the first typing class came to Lone Oak. She was a freshman when the alma mater was written; "We are Loyal to You Lone Oak High." M. Randolph wrote it.

== Closure ==
In the summer of 2007, several public hearings were held discussing the future of Lone Oak High School, and to address the major overcrowding issues in each Lone Oak district school. An initial decision was made that a new Lone Oak High School will be constructed, housing grades 10, 11, and 12. The current high school building will then house grades 7, 8, and 9. The current Lone Oak Middle School building will house grades 4, 5, and 6. The current elementary schools in Lone Oak will then house grades K–3. This solution should put an ease on the excessive overcrowding at Lone Oak Elementary, Hendron Lone Oak Elementary, Lone Oak Middle, and Lone Oak High.

The plans ultimately changed; in December 2008, the McCracken County Public Schools received state approval of a plan calling for a single county high school that would consolidate grades 10 though 12. Under this plan, the three current high schools in the county district (Lone Oak, Reidland, and Heath) would each house grades 7 through 9. The current middle schools would house grades 4 through 6. Then, the current elementary schools would house pre-school through 3. The new school opened on August 9, 2013.

Further changes were made to the plan before McCracken County High opened. First, the new high school houses all four high school grades. Second, the only immediate changes to school locations and assignments were in the former Lone Oak High attendance zone; all K–8 schools in the Heath and Reidland zones remained at their old locations in 2013–14. Under the final plan, Lone Oak Middle houses grades 6–8 in the former Lone Oak High building. The Lone Oak Middle building became the new Lone Oak Intermediate School, housing 4th and 5th grades. The existing Hendron–Lone Oak Elementary and Lone Oak Elementary remain in operation, but serve only K–3 students.

== State champions ==
- Boys Golf: 1978 (Individual, Kenny Perry)
- Boys Tennis Doubles: Brad Robbins & Elliot Treece (2005)
- Boys Tennis Singles: Robby Robertson (1994)
- Girls Tennis: 1992, 1993, 1994, 1995, 1996, 1999, 2000, 2001, 2003, 2009, 2012
- Girls Tennis Doubles: Nikki Edwards & Caroline Steele (1994), Abby Brazzell & Jamie O'Hara (1996), Amanda Beckman & Terin Roof (2003), Amanda Bredniak & Camille Marquess (2005)
- Girls Tennis Singles: Sarah Suitor (2000, 2001)

== Notable alumni ==
- Molly Harper (1996) author
- Kenny Perry (1978) PGA Tour golfer
- Corey Robinson (2008) collegiate quarterback
- Jeri Ryan (née Zimmerman) (1986), actress, model, Miss Illinois
