= Micah Johnson (gridiron football) =

American football player (born 1988)

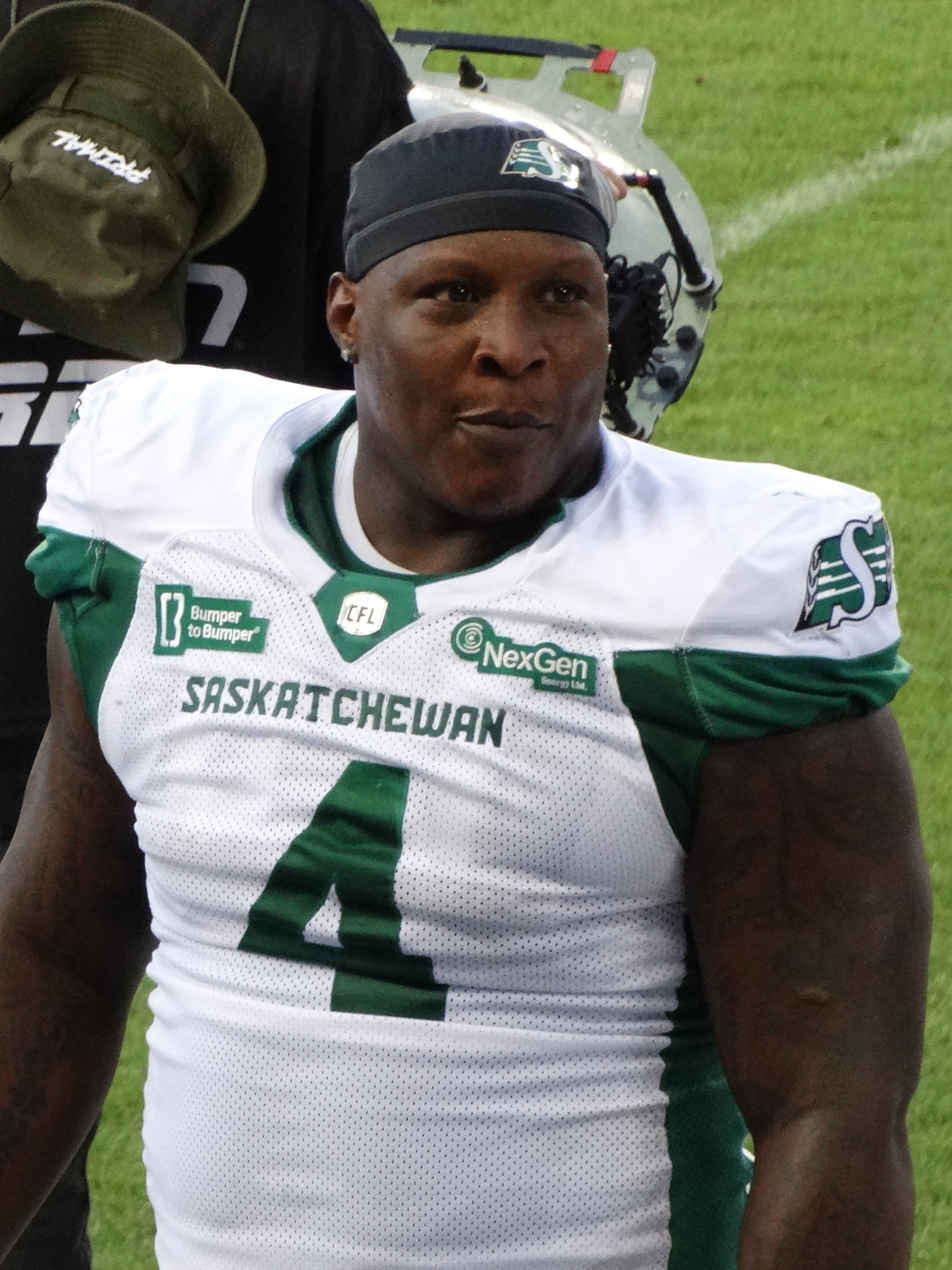
- Johnson with the Saskatchewan Roughriders in 2025

No. 4 – Saskatchewan Roughriders
- Title: Defensive line coach

Personal information
- Born: June 22, 1988 (age 38); Columbus, Georgia, U.S.
- Listed height: 6 ft 1 in (1.85 m)
- Listed weight: 255 lb (116 kg)

Career information
- Position: Defensive tackle
- High school: Fort Campbell (TN)
- College: Kentucky (2006–2009)
- NFL draft: 2010: undrafted

Career history

Playing
- New York Giants (2010)*; Miami Dolphins (2010); Kansas City Chiefs (2010–2011)*; Cincinnati Bengals (2011–2012)*; Green Bay Packers (2012–2013)*; Calgary Stampeders (2013–2018); Saskatchewan Roughriders (2019); BC Lions (2020)*; Saskatchewan Roughriders (2021); Hamilton Tiger-Cats (2022); Saskatchewan Roughriders (2023–2025)
- * Offseason or practice squad member only

Coaching
- Saskatchewan Roughriders (2026–present) Defensive line coach

Awards and highlights
- 3× Grey Cup champion (2014, 2018, 2025); 5× CFL All-Star (2016, 2017, 2018, 2024, 2025); 7× CFL West All-Star (2016–2021, 2024, 2025); CFL East All-Star (2022); First-team All-SEC (2008); Second-team All-SEC (2009); SEC Coaches All-Freshman honors (2006)

Career NFL statistics
- Total tackles: 1
- Stats at Pro Football Reference

Career CFL statistics
- Total tackles: 311
- Sacks: 71
- Interceptions: 2
- Stats at CFL.ca

Micah Johnson (born June 22, 1988) is an American former professional football player who was a defensive tackle in the National Football League (NFL) and Canadian Football League (CFL). He is currently the defensive line coach for the Saskatchewan Roughriders of the CFL. He was originally signed by the New York Giants as an undrafted free agent in 2010. He played college football for the Kentucky Wildcats. Johnson also spent time with the Miami Dolphins, Kansas City Chiefs, Cincinnati Bengals, Green Bay Packers, Calgary Stampeders, Saskatchewan Roughriders, BC Lions, and Hamilton Tiger-Cats.

== Early life ==
While playing linebacker and running back for Fort Campbell High School, Johnson was selected as the 2005 Kentucky Mr. Football. Having played only two years at Ft. Campbell, his career totals there included 2,543 rushing yards, 46 touchdowns, and 293 tackles. Johnson played his freshman and sophomore years at West Potomac High School in Alexandria, Virginia, where he also starred in basketball. A highly regarded recruit, Johnson chose the University of Kentucky over Georgia and Notre Dame. Following his high school career, Johnson was invited to play in the 2006 U.S. Army All-American Bowl.

Rated the nation's top inside linebacker by ESPN, he was also selected as a high school All-American by Parade, EA Sports, PrepStar and SuperPrep. Considered a four-star recruit by Rivals.com, Johnson was listed as the No. 2 strongside defensive end prospect in the nation in 2006.

== College career ==
Johnson recorded 29 tackles (20 solo, nine assist) at linebacker in his freshman season for the Kentucky Wildcats. He was voted to the All-SEC Freshman Team by the coaches of the conference. In the Wildcats' 2006 Music City Bowl victory against Clemson University, Johnson entered the game as a running back and scored a touchdown.

As a sophomore, he recorded 58 tackles, two interceptions and five pass breakups.

As a junior, he recorded 57 solo tackles, 30 assisted, 11.5 for loss and 2.5 sacks. Johnson earned first-team All-SEC honors, and he considered early entry into the 2009 NFL draft. However, Johnson opted to stay for his senior year.

== Professional career ==
Pre-draft measurables
Height	Weight	Arm length	Hand span	40-yard dash	10-yard split	20-yard split	20-yard shuttle	Three-cone drill	Vertical jump	Broad jump	Bench press
6 ft 1 1/2 in (1.87 m)	258 lb (117 kg)	32 in (0.81 m)	9 1/4 in (0.23 m)	4.84 s	1.68 s	2.80 s	4.26 s	7.34 s	29.0 in (0.74 m)	8 ft 11 in (2.72 m)	31 reps
All values from NFL Combine/Pro Day

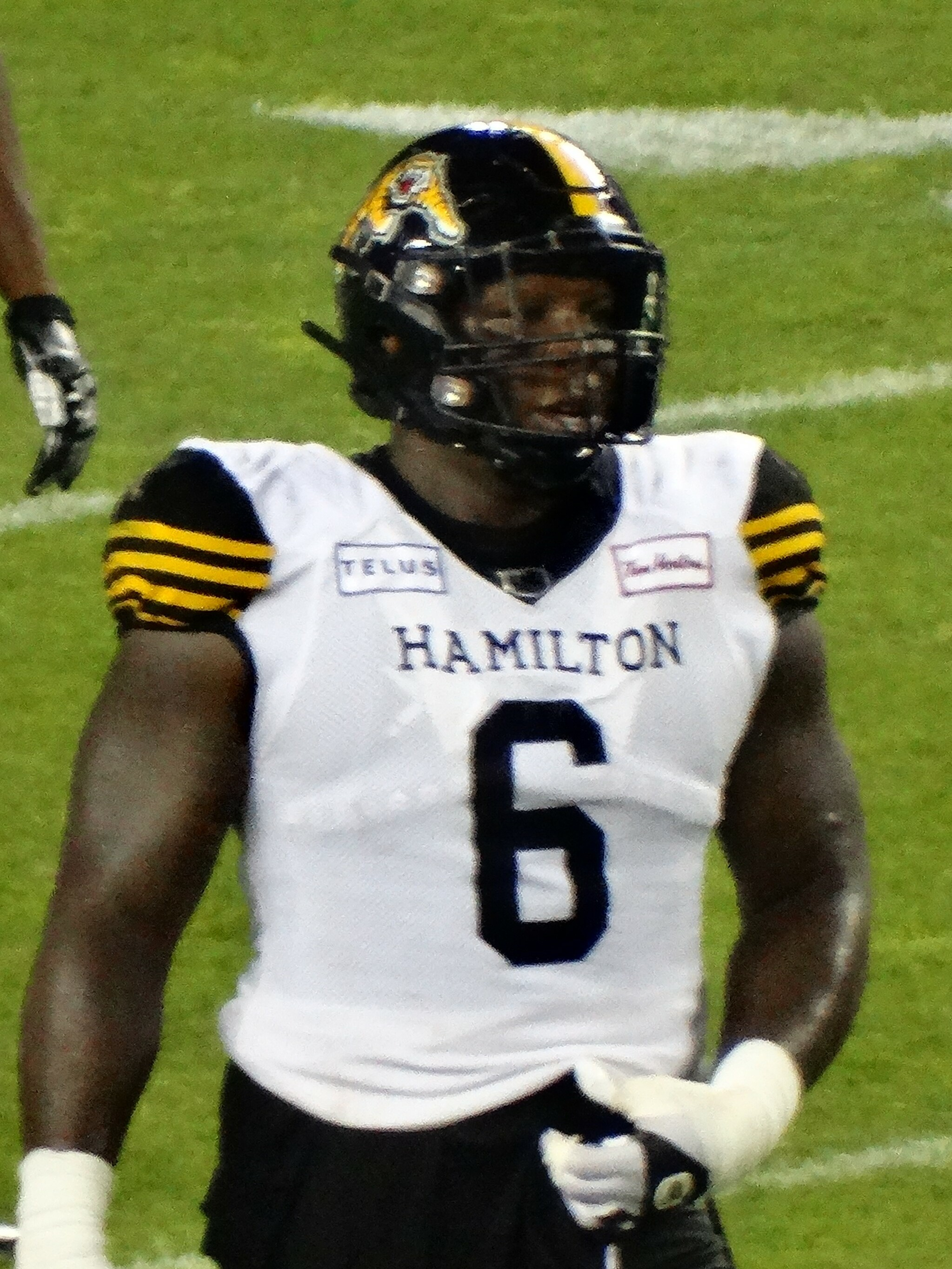
Johnson with the Hamilton Tiger-Cats in 2022

=== New York Giants ===
Johnson was signed by the New York Giants as an undrafted free agent following the 2010 NFL draft. He was waived on June 21, 2010.

=== Miami Dolphins ===
On August 3, 2010, Johnson was signed by the Miami Dolphins. He was waived on September 15, 2010.

=== Kansas City Chiefs ===
On December 8, 2010, Johnson was signed to the practice squad by the Kansas City Chiefs. He played in one regular season game in 2010. He was waived on September 3, 2011.

=== Cincinnati Bengals ===
On December 13, 2011, Johnson was signed by the Cincinnati Bengals to the practice squad.

=== Calgary Stampeders ===
On May 27, Johnson was signed by the Calgary Stampeders of the Canadian Football League. Johnson worked his way up the ranks with Calgary over the years, winning the Grey Cup in 2014 as a backup. Subsequent years saw Johnson working his way into a starting role, while returning to the championship game for the 2016 and 2017 seasons, where Calgary suffered a pair of heartbreaking losses to Ottawa and Toronto. In 2018, Johnson and the Stamps won the 106th Grey Cup, and Johnson's efforts resulted in his recognition as one of the most dominant interior rushers in the game, with 14 sacks, 3 forced fumbles, and an interception. He was named to his 3rd consecutive CFL-West All Star team.

In 81 career games during his six seasons in Calgary, Johnson has amassed 158 tackles, two tackles on special teams, 41 sacks, two interceptions and six forced fumbles.

=== Saskatchewan Roughriders (first stint) ===
On February 12, 2019, Johnson signed a one-year contract with the Saskatchewan Roughriders for $250,000 CAD, making him one of the highest paid defensive players in the CFL. Johnson missed a few games with injury, and had a slow start to the year while adjusting to the new team and defensive scheme; Johnson did not record his first sack until week 13 during the 2019 edition of the Banjo Bowl. However, it was the beginning of a critical stretch of games for the Riders in which Johnson had three consecutive games with a sack, with four in five games. Johnson's 26 tackles and four sacks on the year helped the Riders finish with the best record in the West Division.

=== BC Lions ===
Upon entering free agency, Johnson signed a one-year contract with the BC Lions on February 11, 2020. However, the 2020 CFL season was cancelled and he never played for the Lions.

=== Saskatchewan Roughriders (second stint) ===
On the first day of free agency in 2021, Johnson re-signed with the Saskatchewan Roughriders on February 9, 2021.

=== Hamilton Tiger-Cats ===
On February 9, 2022, Johnson officially signed with the Hamilton Tiger-Cats.

=== Saskatchewan Roughriders (third stint) ===
On February 14, 2023, it was announced that Johnson had re-signed with the Roughriders.

On February 12, 2024, it was announced that he had signed a one-year contract extension with the Roughriders.

On February 7, 2025, the Roughriders announced that Johnson had re-signed with the team.

Johnson announced his retirement as a player on January 5, 2026.

== Coaching career ==
Upon announcing his retirement from his playing career, Johnson announced that he was joining the Roughriders' coaching staff as a defensive line coach on January 5, 2026.

Awards and achievements
Preceded by Curtis Pulley	Kentucky Mr. Football; 2005	Succeeded by Douglas Beaumont
