= Dennis Johnson (defensive end) =

American football player (born 1979)

No. 96, 71
- Position: Defensive end

Personal information
- Born: December 4, 1979 (age 46); Danville, Kentucky, U.S.
- Listed height: 6 ft 5 in (1.96 m)
- Listed weight: 276 lb (125 kg)

Career information
- College: Kentucky
- NFL draft: 2002: 3rd round, 98th overall pick

Career history
- Arizona Cardinals (2002–2003); San Francisco 49ers (2004)

Awards and highlights
- First-team All-SEC (2001); Second-team All-SEC (1999)

Career NFL statistics
- Tackles: 65
- Sacks: 3
- Passes defended: 6
- Stats at Pro Football Reference

Dennis Alan Johnson (born December 4, 1979) is an American former professional football player who was a defensive end for the Arizona Cardinals and San Francisco 49ers of the National Football League (NFL). While playing his senior season for Harrodsburg High School, he was named the National Player of the Year by Sports Illustrated and 1997 National High School Defensive Player of the Year by USA Today and The Sporting News. Johnson played college football for the Kentucky Wildcats, earning third-team All-American and first-team All-Southeastern Conference (SEC) honors.

Johnson is currently the head football coach and district athletic director at Woodford County High School in Versailles, Kentucky.

== Early life ==
Dennis Johnson grew up in Kentucky, where the local high school had very low enrollment. Due to Harrodsburg High School's small size, Johnson was allowed to suit up with the high school varsity team as a second grader. He already stood 5'7" and weighed 170 pounds. His brother, a third grader, was also on the team. The brothers rarely got into a game, but they created enough attention that the state changed the eligibility rules for low-enrollment schools. The brothers had to wait until the seventh grade to play varsity football again. When he returned to the team at age 11, he earned honorable mention all-state honors as a defensive end. Johnson ended his high school career with seven seasons of play and six varsity letters. He was selected as the Sports Illustrated National Player of the Year and the National Defensive Player of the Year by USA Today and The Sporting News.

== College career ==
Johnson attended the University of Kentucky after also being recruited by the University of Notre Dame, the University of Florida, the University of Miami and the University of Colorado. His father Alvis Johnson, who had been a football coach and athletic director at Harrodsburg High School between 1975 and 1997, joined Kentucky as associate athletic director a few months after Johnson committed to the team. Johnson was redshirted after the first game of his junior season (2000) due to an ankle injury. Upon his return in 2001, he led the SEC in tackles for loss, sacks and forced fumbles. He left Kentucky to enter the NFL draft with a year of collegiate eligibility remaining.

== Professional career ==
Pre-draft measurables
Height	Weight	Arm length	Hand span	40-yard dash	10-yard split	20-yard split	20-yard shuttle	Three-cone drill	Vertical jump	Broad jump	Bench press
6 ft 4 5/8 in (1.95 m)	258 lb (117 kg)	34 in (0.86 m)	9 1/4 in (0.23 m)	4.82 s	1.70 s	2.81 s	4.36 s	7.21 s	35.5 in (0.90 m)	9 ft 11 in (3.02 m)	17 reps
All values from NFL Combine

Johnson was selected 98th overall in the third round of the 2002 NFL draft. Johnson played full seasons for the Arizona Cardinals in 2002 and 2003. He appeared in one game for the San Francisco 49ers in 2004. Johnson finished his career with 65 tackles and 3 sacks in 29 games.

== Personal life ==
Johnson's son Jasper Johnson is a top basketball recruit in the class of 2025.

Johnson has coached the Woodford County High School football team from 2015 to present.

Preceded by Derek Homer	Kentucky Mr. Football; 1997	Succeeded by Jared Lorenzen
