= Derek Homer =

American football player

Derek Homer is an American football player who played for the University of Kentucky.

== High school ==
Homer won the Kentucky "Mr. Football" Award at Fort Knox High School in 1996. At graduation he was the most prolific running back in Kentucky high school history, with 8,224 yards on 932 carries and 110 touchdowns. He averaged 8.8 yards per carry and 164.5 yards per game rushing over his career. As a senior, he gained 3,003 yards and 43 touchdowns on 295 carries.

== College ==
Homer played college football at the University of Kentucky for four years. As a freshman, Homer was named to the Knoxville News-Sentinel Freshman All-SEC team after playing in all eleven games (starting six) and gaining 502 yards rushing (5.7 per carry). As a sophomore, Homer started nine games and was Kentucky's leading rusher with 716 yards on 137 carries (5.2 per carry) while also catching 41 passes for 239 yards on a team that played in the Outback Bowl. As a junior, Homer started six games and gained 332 yards on 94 carries and scored two touchdowns in a victory over Louisiana State University en route to the Music City Bowl. As a senior, Homer rushed 34 times for 139 yards and caught 38 passes for 341 yards. Homer left Kentucky having played in all 44 regular season games during his career. He was ranked ninth in school history with 1,689 rushing yards, and third in school history with 129 pass receptions (for 1,052 yards). Homer tallied 2,840 all purpose yards during his college career.

== Professional football ==
Homer was briefly with the Baltimore Ravens of the National Football League. In 2001, Homer played in the NFL Europe for the Barcelona Dragons. Homer was also briefly with the Montreal Alouettes of the Canadian Football League.

== External sources ==
- Pro Football Reference page
- Homer's Odyssey Returns to UK, article in Kentucky Kernel newspaper
- Lexington Horsemen Derek Homer profile page

Preceded by Tim Couch	Kentucky "Mr. Football" Award Winner; 1996	Succeeded by Dennis Johnson
