= McCracken County Public Schools =

School district in Kentucky, United States

McCracken County Public Schools (MCPS) is a school district headquartered in Hendron, unincorporated McCracken County, Kentucky.

The district serves all of McCracken County except for most of the area within the city limits of Paducah, which is served by its own independent school district. However, portions of the city, especially in the west, lie within the McCracken County district, and feed either Heath or Lone Oak Middle School. There are currently eleven schools that make up the MCPS district.

On August 9, 2013, a new McCracken County High School opened, combining the three previous high schools. Lone Oak Middle School moved into the former Lone Oak High building. The previous Lone Oak Middle building became Lone Oak Intermediate School, serving 4th and 5th grade students who had in the past attended Lone Oak and Hendron–Lone Oak Elementary Schools.

== Schools ==
High schools (grades 9 to 12)

- McCracken County High School, Paducah (replaced Lone Oak, Heath, and Reidland High Schools).

Middle schools (grades 6 to 8)

Through the 2011–12 school year, each of these schools fed exclusively to the high school that shared its name. Since 2012–13, they feed McCracken County High.

- Heath Middle School, West Paducah
- Lone Oak Middle School, Lone Oak
- Reidland Middle School, Reidland

Primary schools (grades K to 5) here are listed by the middle schools that they feed.

Heath

- Concord Elementary School
- Heath Elementary School

Lone Oak

- Lone Oak Intermediate School (grades 4–5)
- Hendron Lone Oak Elementary School (K–3)
- Lone Oak Elementary School (K–3)

Reidland

- Farley Elementary School
- Reidland Elementary School
