= Hopkinsville High School =

- Hopkinsville High School a few months after is permanent closure

Location
- 430 Koffman Drive; Hopkinsville, Kentucky 42240; United States; 36.843°N 87.5075°W

Information
- Type: Public high school
- School district: Christian County Public Schools
- Grades: 9 to 12
- Colors: Black and Orange
- Athletics conference: KHSAA
- Nickname: Home of the Tigers/Hoptown High
- Team name: Tigers/Lady Tigers

Hopkinsville High School was a four-year public high school located in Hopkinsville, Kentucky, with over 1,000 students. It was operated by the Christian County Public Schools school district.

== History ==
There was controversy in 1925 when the Christian County Board of Education was found to be failing to maintain a high school within its county seat but it was determined that the arrangements made with Hopkinsville High School met the legal requirements. Subsequently, administration was taken over by the Christian County Public Schools school district.

In August 2021, Christian County Public Schools Board voted to consolidate Christian County High School, Hopkinsville High School and Gateway Academy to a College & Career Academy High School (formerly named Hopkinsville–Christian County Academy, now changed to Christian County High School). The planned opening of the school is the Fall semester of 2026, with Christian County High School and Hopkinsville High School closing the same semester.

== Academic standards ==
Teachers boycotted graduation exercises, in May 1998, after the school board granted diplomas to three seniors. The circumstances were investigated by state officials. Education Commissioner Bill Cody said the Christian County school board's action was "an awful decision" and probably illegal but the students were allowed to make up their courses at summer school.

== Athletics ==
Hopkinsville High School competed in the Kentucky High School Athletic Association. The school mascot was the Tiger and the school colors are black and orange.

In 1965 and 1966, the Hopkinsville High School football teams won the state AA football title with undefeated seasons, under coach Fleming Thornton.

In 1985, the boys' basketball team won the state title. The 1985 team also won that year's McDonald's Classic, defeating DeMatha Catholic High School of Hyattsville, Maryland by a score of 74–69 in the tournament final. The Tigers Basketball team advanced to the Final Four in 2013.

Hopkinsville High School was also one out of four high schools in Kentucky to have an indoor swimming pool on campus.

== Other extra-curricular activities ==
The marching band joined with cross-town-rivals Christian County High School in 2008. The idea came about in the summer break of 2007, when the indoor drumline program would be conjoined. Indoor drumline was a success, and the two schools joined for the regular marching season. The band is used the name CoHop, representing Christian County High School and Hopkinsville High School. However, they had split back up into two different bands at some point in the early half of the 2010s.

During the 2015 KMEA Marching Band season, the Hopkinsville marching band made school history by advancing to the Finalist round, earning 4th place in class AAAA.

On October 29, 2016, the Hopkinsville High School Marching Band again made history by claiming the title of Class AAAA State Champions at the KMEA State Marching Band Championships. This was the first time in school history that the band won a state championship, and their second appearance in Finals competition since the creation of the KMEA SMBC.

The Band of Tigers won their third straight Class 4A West Region Championship on October 21, 2017. On October 28, 2017, the Band placed first at the Class 4A Semifinals competition at South Oldham High School, claiming a spot in Finals for the 3rd time. That night the Band of Tigers competed at Papa John's Cardinal Stadium in Louisville, Kentucky and placed 2nd in Class 4A receiving the title of Runner Up. The Tigers fell to first time champion Anderson County High School.

On October 20, 2018, the Band of Tigers won their fourth consecutive 4A West Regional Championship. The next Saturday they advanced to KMEA 4A State Finals yet again after placing 2nd at the State Semifinals competition.

== Notable alumni ==
- Bird Averitt (1952–2020), professional basketball player
- Robert A. Baker (1921–2005), psychologist, "ghost buster" and skeptic
- Ned Breathitt (1924–2003), 51st governor of Kentucky
- Jerry Claiborne (1928–2000), college football coach and member of the College Football Hall of Fame
- Edward M. Coffman (1929–2020), military historian, academic and author
- John Miller Cooper (1912–2010), basketball jump shot innovator and pioneer of kinesiology
- Myron Dossett, politician
- Logan Feland (1869–1936), Major General in the United States Marine Corps
- bell hooks (1952–2021), academic and author
- Dave Means (born 1952), professional football player
- Easton McGee (born 1997), professional baseball pitcher
- Artose Pinner (born 1978), gridiron football player
- Curtis Pulley (born 1986), gridiron football player, selected as Kentucky Mr. Football 2004 after his senior year
- Jamarion Sharp (born 2001), basketball player

== See also ==
- South Kentucky College
