= Kentucky High School Athletic Association =

Athletics governing body

- Abbreviation: KHSAA
- Formation: 1917
- Type: Volunteer; NPO
- Legal status: Association
- Purpose: Athletic/Educational
- Headquarters: 2280 Executive Dr.
- Location: Lexington, Kentucky 40505
- Coordinates: 38.043332°N 84.428418°W
- Region served: Kentucky
- Commissioner: Julian Tackett
- Affiliations: National Federation of State High School Associations
- Budget: $3.2 million (2015)
- Staff: 16
- Volunteers: 250
- Website: KHSAA Official Website
- Remarks: (859) 299-5472

The Kentucky High School Athletic Association (KHSAA) has been the governing body of the U.S. state of Kentucky's high school athletics since 1917. It is headquartered in Lexington, Kentucky.

== Sports ==
The organization sanctions competition in the following sports:

- Boys' and girls': Basketball, Bowling, Cross-country, Golf, Soccer, Swimming, Tennis, Lacrosse, Track and field.
- Boys only: Baseball, Football, Wrestling (girls are eligible to wrestle in a co-ed format with boys also, although some schools have dedicated women's teams that participate in a separate, girls-only division of the sport).
- Girls only: Fastpitch softball, Volleyball, Girls' Wrestling.

Competitive bowling, bass fishing, and archery were sanctioned beginning in the 2011–12 school year.

Competition in girls' slow-pitch softball was discontinued after the 2006–07 academic year.

== Schools governed ==
The KHSAA governs competitions for both public and private schools throughout the state, plus two federally administered schools—Fort Campbell and Fort Knox High Schools, located on the U.S. Army bases of the same names. Fort Campbell High is actually located on the Tennessee side of the base, which straddles the state border, but the U.S. Department of Defense organizes the schools it runs on the two bases under a single district.

Not all secondary schools in Kentucky participate in the KHSAA. About two dozen small, private religious schools are sanctioned by the Kentucky Christian Athletic Association. KHSAA was created by the Kentucky Department of Education to manage high school athletes in Kentucky.

Whether public, private, or federally administered, all member schools compete for state championships on an equal basis. Unlike some other states' school athletic governing bodies, the KHSAA governs only athletics; it does not govern band, academic competitions or other extracurricular activities. These activities are governed by separate bodies.

== Classifications ==
Unlike the situation in most states, the default in Kentucky is to conduct a single state championship for all schools, with no classification of schools by enrollment. Most notably, Kentucky does not divide schools into classes in basketball, with Delaware being the only other remaining state with a single state basketball championship for each sex. Of the 13 sports in which the KHSAA sanctions state championships, only three are organized in multiple classes—cross-country, football, and track. As of the 2007–08 school year, the classification rules for the three sports which are divided are:

- Cross-country and track
  - Class A — 570 or fewer students
  - Class AA — 571–950 students
  - Class AAA — More than 950 students
- Football
  - Class 6A — The 32 largest schools in the state, based on average enrollment (see below) of boys only, among schools that sponsor the sport.
  - Class 5A, 4A, 3A, 2A — Each with 36 schools, in decreasing order of enrollment
  - Class A — All remaining schools that sponsor football after the other classes are filled

The 2007–08 school year was the first for a six-class alignment in football; previously, a four-class system had been used.

Schools were allowed to petition the KHSAA for reclassification before the football realignment became final. Eleven schools requested that the KHSAA place them in a higher class than their enrollment warranted; six of these requests were approved. No school was allowed to play in a lower class, although the KHSAA accepted one school's request to adjust its enrollment downward. As a result of these requests, the final number of schools in each classification was:

Class	Number of Schools
Class 6A	32 schools
Class 5A	37 schools
Class 4A	35 schools
Class 3A	39 schools (now 38)
Class 2A	33 schools
Class A	41 schools (now 39)
Total	218 schools

In all three sports, classification is based on a four-year average enrollment in grades 9 through 12. Single-sex schools are deemed to have double their actual average enrollment for cross-country and track; prior to the 2007 realignment, football also used this rule. In cross-country and track, the KHSAA rule is to divide the classes so that 40% of all schools that sponsor the sport are in Class A and 30% are in both Class AA and AAA.

== Eligibility considerations ==
As is standard for high school sports in the U.S., students are limited to four consecutive years of eligibility (grades 9–12), whether or not they participate in any sports during one or more of those years. In football and soccer, students are not allowed to play on the varsity until they are actually enrolled in the ninth grade, and wrestlers cannot compete until they have entered the seventh grade. In other sports, there is no grade restriction; for example, former NBA player O. J. Mayo first played on a high school varsity team as a seventh-grader at Rose Hill Christian School in Ashland, and current PGA Tour golfer JB Holmes first played on the golf team of Taylor County High School in Campbellsville while in the third grade. The eligibility "clock" for such students does not start until they enter ninth grade.

Like all U.S. jurisdictions, Kentucky has an upper age limit for high school athletic participation. The KHSAA rule is that students must be under age 19 as of the July 31 preceding the current academic year. This particular rule is actually codified in Kentucky Revised Statutes § 156.270(2)(e).

Students who are repeating a grade during high school for any reason is not allowed to compete during their second year at that grade level.

Homeschoolers are prohibited from joining any KHSAA-sanctioned team or participating in any KHSAA-sanctioned tournaments. However, KHSAA schools are now required by law to allow KHSAA teams to compete against teams composed of homeschoolers during regular season play.

== See also ==
- List of Kentucky High School Athletic Association championships
- KHSAA Commonwealth Gridiron Bowl (Football State Championships)
- Sweet Sixteen (KHSAA State Basketball Championship)
- Kentucky Mr. Basketball Award
- Mr. Football Award (Kentucky)
- National Federation of State High School Associations
