= Paducah Public Schools =

Public school district in Paducah, Kentucky

Paducah Public Schools is a school district located in Paducah, Kentucky. The district serves most, but not all, of the city of Paducah; significant areas within the city limits (mostly in the west) lie in the surrounding McCracken County school district.

The district, founded in 1864, currently educates slightly over 2,900 students in six schools, with approximately 240 teachers and a roughly equal number of support staff. Roughly 90% of graduates of the district's only high school, Paducah Tilghman High School, go on to either two-year or four-year colleges, a commendable total considering that about 50% of the district's students are minorities and nearly two-thirds are eligible for free or reduced-price school lunches.

The Paducah and McCracken County districts have a joint open-enrollment policy which permits any student in McCracken County to attend a public school in either district without tuition charges. About 300 residents of the McCracken County district currently attend Paducah schools.

== High schools (grades 9 to 12) ==
- Paducah Tilghman High School

== Middle schools (grades 6 to 8) ==
- Paducah Middle School

== Primary schools (grades K to 5) ==
- Clark Elementary
- McNabb Elementary
- Morgan Elementary

== Former schools ==
- Cooper-Whiteside Elementary, closed due to budget cutbacks in 2006

== Notes and references ==
The old Cooper-Whiteside building is now occupied by the Choices Educational Center as the city alternative school. It serves students from elementary to high school.
