= Fort Knox Middle High School =

Coordinates: 37°53′9.24″N 85°56′41.66″W

Fort Knox High School

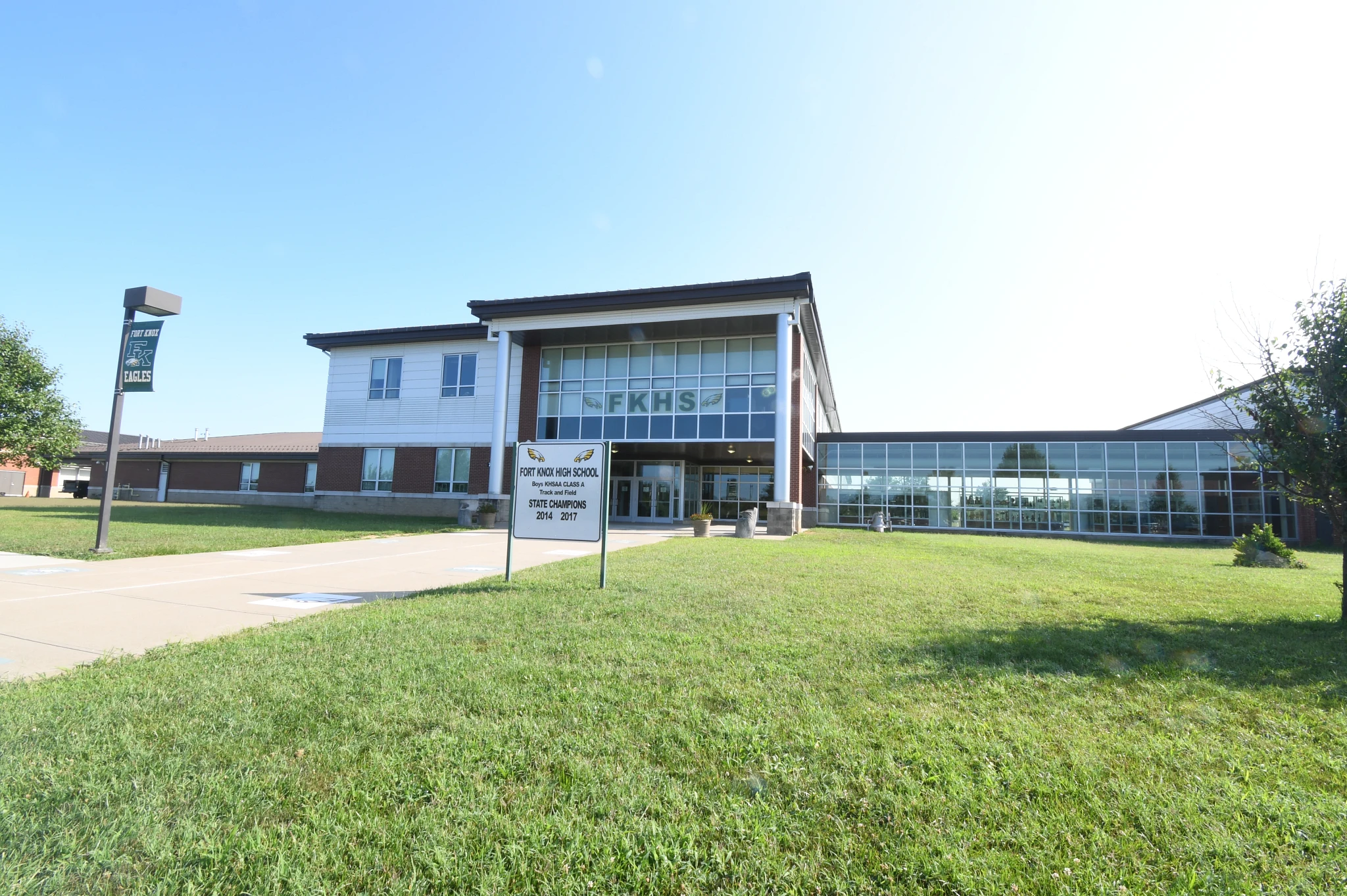

Location
- Building 7501, 266 Maine Street; Fort Knox, KY 40121; United States

Information
- School type: US Department of Defense
- School district: DoDEA America, Kentucky District
- Principal: Christopher Ford
- Grades: 9–12
- Enrollment: 331 (2025–26)
- Campus: Military base
- Colors: Green, gold, and white
- Nickname: Eagles and Lady Eagles
- Feeder schools: Scott Middle School
- Website: fortknoxhs.dodea.edu

Fort Knox High School is a high school in Hardin County, Kentucky, United States, serving grades 9–12 on the grounds of Fort Knox. The original building was constructed in 1958, with further additions in 1961, 1966, 1987 and 1989. In April 2009 a $18.1 million construction project funded by money from the Department of War Education Activity (DoWEA) which runs the Fort Knox Community Schools system was begun to construct a new metal-roofed brick and masonry-facade two-story building, connecting to the existing vocational school and the gym. The new building replaced 71,510 square feet (6,643 m^{2}) of the original 1958 facility. It includes 20 new classrooms, two computer labs, a commons, geothermal heating and air conditioning, recessed lockers for improved traffic flow, and specialized functional areas for art, band, science labs, and technology courses. It has a capacity of 462 students. Groundbreaking was April 2009, construction was completed in July, and the dedication ceremony was held on August 7. Most of the old high school building has been demolished.

The school's mascot is the Eagle. The mascot is nicknamed Eddy the Eagle. Varsity sports include volleyball, football, swimming, soccer, baseball, basketball, powerlifting, wrestling, track and field, tennis, bowling, and softball.

== Notable alumni ==
- J.B. Brown, former Harlem Globetrotters and graduate of Kentucky Wesleyan
- Romeo Crennel, former NFL head coach of the Cleveland Browns and Kansas City Chiefs; former defensive coordinator of the Houston Texans; current Assistant Head Coach and Defense for the Houston Texans
- Derek Homer, former professional football player
- Jim Obradovich, former professional baseball player (Houston Astros)
