= Paducah Tilghman High School =

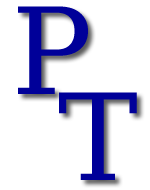

Location
- 2400 Washington Street; Paducah, Kentucky 42003; United States; 37°04′22″N 88°37′24″W

Information
- School type: Public, high school
- Motto: Academic Excellence, Tradition, and Pride
- School district: Paducah Public Schools
- CEEB code: 182085
- Principal: Deatrik Kinney
- Teaching staff: 56.50 (FTE)
- Grades: 9–12
- Enrollment: 860 (2024–2025)
- Student to teacher ratio: 15.22
- Campus: Small city
- Colors: Blue; White
- Athletics: Football, soccer, baseball, track, fast-pitch softball, wrestling, tennis, golf, cheerleading, swimming, volleyball, basketball, cross-country, mountain biking, bowling
- Nickname: Blue Tornado
- Newspaper: The Bell
- Yearbook: Pathways
- Feeder schools: Paducah Middle School
- Website: paducah.kyschools.us/o/paducah-tilghman-hs

Paducah Tilghman High School is a public secondary school in Paducah, Kentucky. It is the only high school in the Paducah Independent School District.

== History ==
The school opened at its first location in 1900, and was named Paducah High School, and was a segregated school for white students. In 1921, the school moved to a location on Jetton Boulevard, and the original building became the location for Washington Junior High School. That first building has since been demolished.

The new school on Jetton Boulevard was named Augusta Tilghman High School in honor of Augusta Tilghman, whose sons donated $20,000 for the school's construction. Augusta Tilghman was the wife of Lloyd Tilghman, a Confederate States Army general and Paducah native who died in the Battle of Vicksburg. The building also housed Walter C. Jetton Middle School. The Jetton Boulevard building was listed on the National Register of Historic Places in 1995.

The current school, named Paducah Tilghman High School, is larger than the previous two schools. In 1965, the Lincoln School, a segregated African American public high school in Paducah was consolidated into the Paducah Tilghman High School, which had existed as a segregated white school prior.

A Paducah Tilghman High School student was one of 121 students in the United States named a Presidential Scholar in 1972.

== Rivalries ==
Tilghman's rivalry with Mayfield High School dates back 98 years, when Tilghman won a competitive football game. Tilghman participates in "Mayfield Week" where students show school spirit by dressing up throughout the week on "hick day, dooms day, blue and white day, 80's day and twin day."

In addition Tilghman often battles Lone Oak for division championships in most sports, and Heath in soccer, having met in the District Championships for the last 9 years. Lastly, Tilghman's rivalry with Hopkinsville dates back to when both schools participated in Class AAA football. Before the playoff format changed in the late 1980s, only the district champion made the playoffs. This game was very important to both schools since both were usually undefeated in district play before they met on the field for the final game of the season.

== Notable alumni ==
- Kurt Barber, 1987 KHSAA Mr. Football Winner; All American at University of Southern California USC; professional NFL player with New York Jets
- Benjamin Beaton, United States District Judge of the United States District Court for the Western District of Kentucky
- Hunter Cantwell, quarterback for the University of Louisville, quarterback for the NFL Carolina Panthers, and head football coach at Carroll County High School (Kentucky)
- Steve Finley, former major league baseball player, 2-time All-Star, 5-time Gold Glove winner, won the 2001 World Series with the Arizona Diamondbacks
- Josh Forrest, former NFL player
- J. D. Grey, President of the Southern Baptist Convention
- Robert H. Grubbs, chemist and Nobel laureate
- Bryan Hall, won Super Bowl XLVII with the Baltimore Ravens
- Curtis Hamilton, professional football player
- J. D. Harmon, professional football player
- Billy Jack Haskins, 1992 KHSAA Mr. Football winner
- Edward G McFarland, professor and surgeon, Johns Hopkins School of Medicine
- Jeff McWaters, Class of 1974, founder, Amerigroup; Virginia state senator
- Glenn Shaw, professional football player for the Chicago Bears, Los Angeles Rams, and Oakland Raiders
- Terry Shumpert, professional baseball player
- George Wilson, professional football player for the Tennessee Titans and Buffalo Bills
