= Sweet Sixteen (KHSAA State Basketball Championship) =

Kentucky high school basketball tournaments

The Kentucky High School Athletic Association boys' and girls' state basketball championships are single elimination tournaments held each March featuring 16 high schools. Colloquially known as the Sweet Sixteen (the KHSAA holds a trademark on the phrase). Since 2019, both the boys' and girls' tournaments takes place over four days at downtown Lexington's Rupp Arena.

== History ==
The Kentucky High School Boys' Basketball State Tournament began in 1918. For the first fourteen years, there were 18 regions that encompassed the tournament. Since 1932, there have only been 16 regions, thus the term "Sweet Sixteen" was coined. Kentucky is one of only two states (Delaware is the other) that still play a state tournament without a class system that divides large and small schools into separate tournaments.

The first six tournaments were held at the University of Kentucky gymnasium in Lexington. After 1923, the tournament continued to be held in Lexington, but moved to the new Alumni Gymnasium on UK's campus which had become the new venue for the university's basketball teams, where it stayed from 1924 until 1944. In 1945, the tournament moved to the Louisville Gardens until 1950, when it moved back to Lexington and took up residence at Memorial Coliseum, again on the UK campus. Once construction was complete on Freedom Hall in Louisville, the 1957 tournament was held there and returned in odd-numbered years.

In 1965, Freedom Hall agreed to host the tournament for fourteen consecutive years until 1978. The opening of Rupp Arena in 1979 led to the tournament's return to Lexington, where it remains to the present day. However, Freedom Hall has hosted the tournament six times since then, the most recent being in 1994.

Both the boys' and girls' tournaments were cancelled in 2020 due to the COVID-19 pandemic.

In 2026, George Rogers Clark became the first school in the modern era to claim both the boys and girls State Championships in the same season.

== Notable participants ==
=== Boys' Tournament ===
Notable participants in the Kentucky High School Boys' Basketball State Tournament
Player	Years	High School	College	Notes (NBA draft selections, pro rosters made, head coaching tenures, etc.)
Butch Beard	1964, 1965	Breckinridge County	Louisville	Mr. Basketball '65; 10^{th} pick, 1969 draft; Atlanta Hawks
Ralph Beard	1944, 1945	Louisville Male	Kentucky	Indianapolis Olympians
Brian Brohm	2004	Trinity (Louisville)	Louisville (football)	Green Bay Packers (football)
Greg Buckner	1992, 1994	University Heights (Hopkinsville)	Clemson	Dallas Mavericks
Michael Bush	2001	Louisville Male	Louisville (football)	Chicago Bears (football)
Mike Casey	1965, 1966	Shelby County (Shelbyville)	Kentucky	Mr. Basketball '66
Rex Chapman	1985	Apollo (Owensboro)	Kentucky	Mr. Basketball '86; 8^{th} pick, 1988 draft; Charlotte Hornets
Kelly Coleman	1956	Wayland	Kentucky Wesleyan	Mr. Basketball '56; holds overall PPG and single-game scoring/rebound tournament records
Tim Couch	1990	Leslie County	Kentucky (football)	Cleveland Browns (football)
Dave Cowens	1966	Newport Central Catholic	Florida State	Boston Celtics
Johnny Cox	1953, 1955	Hazard	Kentucky	Chicago Packers
Wesley Cox	1973	Louisville Male	Louisville	Mr. Basketball '73; 18^{th} pick, 1977 draft; Golden State Warriors
Richie Farmer	1984, 1985, 1986, 1987, 1988	Clay County (Manchester)	Kentucky	Played in '84 season as 8^{th} grader; Mr. Basketball '88
Travis Ford	1989	Madisonville	Kentucky	St. Louis Billikens head coach (men's basketball)
Jack Givens	1972, 1974	Lexington Bryan Station	Kentucky	Mr. Basketball '74; 16^{th} pick, 1978 draft; Atlanta Hawks
Darrell Griffith	1974, 1975	Louisville Male	Louisville	Mr. Basketball '76; 2^{nd} pick, 1980 draft; Utah Jazz
Cliff Hagan	1948, 1949	Owensboro	Kentucky	St. Louis Hawks
Clem Haskins	1963	Taylor County	Western Kentucky	Chicago Bulls, Phoenix Suns
Dominique Hawkins	2013	Madison Central (Richmond)	Kentucky	Mr. Basketball '13
Allan Houston	1987, 1988	Ballard (Louisville)	Tennessee	Mr. Basketball '89; 11^{th} pick, 1993 draft; New York Knicks
Wallace "Wah Wah" Jones	1942, 1944, 1945	Harlan (Note: Unlike the other county schools, Harlan High was not part of 2008 consolidation that created Harlan County High School. Harlan High is instead operated by Harlan City School District.)	Kentucky	Indianapolis Olympians
Roy Kidd	1950	Corbin	Eastern Kentucky	Hall of Fame coach (football)
Jeff Lamp	1977	Ballard (Louisville)	Virginia	Mr. Basketball '77; 1981 NCAA All-American; 15^{th} pick, 1981 draft
Dan Langhi	1995	Marshall County	Vanderbilt	SEC Player of the Year '00; 31st pick, 2000 draft; Rockets, Suns
Chris Lofton	2002, 2003, 2004	Mason County	Tennessee	Mr. Basketball '04; SEC Player of the Year '07; NCAA All-American 2007/2008
O. J. Mayo	2003	Rose Hill Christian (Ashland)	Southern California	3^{rd} pick, 2008 NBA draft; Memphis Grizzlies, Dallas Mavericks, Milwaukee Bucks
Jim McDaniels	1967	Allen County (Scottsville)	Western Kentucky	Mr. Basketball '67; Seattle SuperSonics
Darius Miller	2008	Mason County	Kentucky	Mr. Basketball '08; New Orleans Pelicans
Dirk Minniefield	1979	Lexington Lafayette	Kentucky	Mr. Basketball '79; Cleveland Cavaliers
Frank Selvy	1950	Corbin	Furman	Minneapolis/Los Angeles Lakers
Mike Silliman	1962	St. Xavier (Louisville)	Army	Mr. Basketball '62; Buffalo Braves
Dwight Smith	1963	Princeton Dotson	Western Kentucky	Milwaukee Bucks
Felton Spencer	1985, 1986	Eastern (Louisville)	Louisville	Minnesota Timberwolves, Utah Jazz, Golden State Warriors, New York Knicks
Wes Unseld	1963, 1964	Seneca MCA (Louisville)	Louisville	Mr. Basketball '64; 2^{nd} pick, 1968 draft; Washington Wizards
J.R. VanHoose	1995, 1996, 1997, 1998	Paintsville	Marshall	Mr. Basketball '98
Player	Years	High School	College	Notes (NBA draft selections, pro rosters made, head coaching tenures, etc.)

== 2026 Tournament Results ==
2026 UK Healthcare/KHSAA Boys' Sweet Sixteen® State Basketball Tournament

March 18-21, 2026 — Rupp Arena (Lexington, KY)

-:Note: First round seeds indicate ordinal position by region, match-ups are determined by random draw.

First round March 18-19	Quarterfinals; March 20
9	Covington Catholic	61
7	Saint Xavier	75
Saint Xavier	46
North Laurel	44
4	Warren Central	38
13	North Laurel	52
March 18
5	Taylor County	64
3	Grayson County	73
Grayson County	58
Great Crossing	50
12	Danville Christian	47
11	Great Crossing	57
6	Butler	54
14	Hazard	39
Butler	56
North Oldham	62
8	North Oldham	74
2	Lyon County	61
March 19
10	George Rogers Clark	75
15	Johnson Central	60
George Rogers Clark	63
Marshall County	59
16	Boyd County	64
1	Marshall County	68

Semifinals; March 21
Saint Xavier	67
Grayson County	37
North Oldham	45
George Rogers Clark	53

State Championship; March 21
Saint Xavier	50
George Rogers Clark	58 ot

2026 Clarks Pump N Shop/KHSAA Girls' Sweet Sixteen® State Basketball Tournament

March 11-14, 2026 — Rupp Arena (Lexington, KY)

-:Note: First round seeds indicate ordinal position by region, match-ups are determined by random draw.

First round March 11-12	Quarterfinals; March 13
2	Henderson County	23
11	Frederick Douglass	44
Frederick Douglass	30
Assumption	32
1	Calloway County	35
7	Assumption	72
March 11
15	Pikeville	38
9	Notre Dame	77
Notre Dame	36
Taylor County	44
12	West Jessamine	58
5	Taylor County	60
8	Simon Kenton	70
16	Ashland Blazer	61
Simon Kenton	63
Owensboro Catholic	50
14	Letcher County Central	35
3	Owensboro Catholic	59
March 12
4	Franklin-Simpson	66
6	Bullitt East	47
Franklin-Simpson	34
George Rogers Clark	69
13	North Laurel	46
10	George Rogers Clark	55

Semifinals; March 14
Assumption	48
Taylor County	29
Simon Kenton	40
George Rogers Clark	66

State Championship; March 14
Assumption	43
George Rogers Clark	48

== Boys' Basketball State Championship ==
=== Tournament results, by year ===
KHSAA Boys' Sweet Sixteen State Champions (by year)
Year	Champion	Score	Runner-up	Venue	Most Valuable Player
1917	Owensboro	12–9	Somerset	Centre College, Danville	
1918	Lexington	16–15	Somerset	Centre College, Danville	
1919	Lexington	21–17	Somerset	UK Gymnasium, Lexington	
1920	Lexington	56–13	Ashland	UK Gymnasium, Lexington	
1921	DuPont Manual	32–17	Union Academy	UK Gymnasium, Lexington	
1922	Lexington	52–27	Frankfort	UK Gymnasium, Lexington	
1923	DuPont Manual	41–17	Clark County	UK Gymnasium, Lexington	
1924	Lexington	15–10	Fort Thomas	Alumni Gym, Lexington	
1925	DuPont Manual	40–11	Winchester	Alumni Gym, Lexington	
1926	St. Xavier	26–13	Danville	Alumni Gym, Lexington	
1927	Millersburg	34–25	London	Alumni Gym, Lexington	
1928	Ashland	13–11 (4OT)	Carr Creek	Alumni Gym, Lexington	
1929	Heath	21–16	Corinth	Alumni Gym, Lexington	
1930	Corinth	22–20	Kavanaugh	Alumni Gym, Lexington	
1931	DuPont Manual	34–23	Tolu	Alumni Gym, Lexington	
1932	Hazard	15–13	Male	Alumni Gym, Lexington	
1933	Ashland	33–25	Horse Cave	Alumni Gym, Lexington	
1934	Ashland	26–13	Danville	Alumni Gym, Lexington	
1935	St. Xavier	32–18	Newport	Alumni Gym, Lexington	
1936	Corbin	24–18	Nebo	Alumni Gym, Lexington	
1937	Midway	30–22	Inez	Alumni Gym, Lexington	
1938	Sharpe	36–27	Maysville	Alumni Gym, Lexington	
1939	Brooksville	42–39	Hindman	Alumni Gym, Lexington	
1940	Hazel Green	35–29	Ashland	Alumni Gym, Lexington	
1941	Inez	35–27	St. Xavier	Alumni Gym, Lexington	
1942	Lafayette	44–32	Harlan	Armory, Louisville	
1943	Hindman	29–26	St. Xavier	Alumni Gym, Lexington	
1944	Harlan	40–28	Dayton	Alumni Gym, Lexington	
1945	Male	54–42	Central City	Armory, Louisville	
1946	Breckenridge Training	68–36	Dawson Springs	Armory, Louisville	
1947	Maysville	54–50	Brewers	Armory, Louisville	
1948	Brewers	65–48	Maysville	Armory, Louisville	
1949	Owensboro	65–47	Lafayette	Armory, Louisville	
1950	Lafayette	55–51	Clark County	Armory, Louisville	
1951	Clark County	69–44	Cuba	Memorial Coliseum, Lexington	
1952	Cuba	58–52	DuPont Manual	Memorial Coliseum, Lexington	
1953	Lafayette	84–53	Paducah Tilghman	Memorial Coliseum, Lexington	
1954	Inez	63–55	Newport	Memorial Coliseum, Lexington	
1955	Hazard	74–66	Adair County	Memorial Coliseum, Lexington	
1956	Carr Creek	72–68	Henderson	Memorial Coliseum, Lexington	
1957	Lafayette	55–52	Eastern	Freedom Hall, Louisville	
1958	St. Xavier	60–49	Daviess County	Memorial Coliseum, Lexington	
1959	North Marshall	64–63	DuPont Manual	Memorial Coliseum, Lexington	
1960	Flaget	65–56	Monticello	Freedom Hall, Louisville	
1961	Ashland	69–50	Lexington Dunbar	Memorial Coliseum, Lexington	
1962	St. Xavier	62–58	Ashland	Freedom Hall, Louisville	
1963	Seneca	72–66	Lexington Dunbar	Freedom Hall, Louisville	
1964	Seneca	66–56	Breckinridge County	Memorial Coliseum, Lexington	
1965	Breckinridge County	95–73	Covington Holy Cross	Freedom Hall, Louisville	
1966	Shelby County	62–57	Male	Freedom Hall, Louisville	
1967	Earlington	54–53	Covington Catholic	Freedom Hall, Louisville	
1968	Glasgow	77–68	Seneca	Freedom Hall, Louisville	
1969	Central	101–72	Ohio County	Freedom Hall, Louisville	
1970	Male	70–69	Richmond Madison	Freedom Hall, Louisville	
1971	Male	83–66	Anderson County	Freedom Hall, Louisville	
1972	Owensboro	71–63	Elizabethtown	Freedom Hall, Louisville	
1973	Shawnee	81–68	Male	Freedom Hall, Louisville	
1974	Central	59–54	Male	Freedom Hall, Louisville	
1975	Male	74–59	Henry Clay	Freedom Hall, Louisville	
1976	Edmonson County	74–52	Christian County	Freedom Hall, Louisville	
1977	Ballard	68–59	Valley	Freedom Hall, Louisville	
1978	Shelby County	68–66 (OT)	Covington Holmes	Freedom Hall, Louisville	
1979	Lafayette	62–52	Christian County	Rupp Arena, Lexington	
1980	Owensboro	57–56	Doss	Freedom Hall, Louisville	
1981	Simon Kenton	70–63	Mason County	Rupp Arena, Lexington	Troy McKinley (Simon Kenton)
1982	Laurel County	53–51	North Hardin	Rupp Arena, Lexington	Todd May (Virgie)
1983	Henry Clay	35–33 (3OT)	Carlisle County	Rupp Arena, Lexington	Steve Miller (Henry Clay)
1984	Logan County	83–70	Bourbon County	Rupp Arena, Lexington	Fred Tisdale (Logan County)
1985	Hopkinsville	65–64	Clay County	Rupp Arena, Lexington	Wendall Quarles (Hopkinsville)
1986	Pulaski County	47–45	Pleasure Ridge Park	Rupp Arena, Lexington	Reggie Hanson (Pulaski County)
1987	Clay County	76–73 (OT)	Ballard	Rupp Arena, Lexington	Richie Farmer (Clay County)
1988	Ballard	88–79	Clay County	Freedom Hall, Louisville	Richie Farmer (Clay County)
1989	Pleasure Ridge Park	75–73	Wayne County	Rupp Arena, Lexington	Andy Penick (Pleasure Ridge Park)
1990	Fairdale	77–73	Covington Holmes	Freedom Hall, Louisville	Jermaine Brown (Fairdale)
1991	Fairdale	67–63	Tates Creek	Rupp Arena, Lexington	Jermaine Brown (Fairdale)
1992	University Heights	59–57	Lexington Catholic	Freedom Hall, Louisville	Darren Allaway (University Heights)
1993	Marion County	85–77	Paul Laurence Dunbar	Rupp Arena, Lexington	Anthony Epps (Marion County)
1994	Fairdale	59–56	Paul Laurence Dunbar	Freedom Hall, Louisville	Rashawn Morris (Fairdale)
1995	Breckinridge County	70–63	Pleasure Ridge Park	Rupp Arena, Lexington	Patrick Critchelow (Breckinridge County)
1996	Paintsville	71–53	Ashland Blazer	Rupp Arena, Lexington	J.R. VanHoose (Paintsville)
1997	Eastern	71–59	Fort Thomas Highlands	Rupp Arena, Lexington	Trent Coward (Eastern)
1998	Scott County	89–78	Paintsville	Rupp Arena, Lexington	Rick Jones (Scott County)
1999	Ballard	71–47	Scott County	Rupp Arena, Lexington	Will Partin (Ballard)
2000	Elizabethtown	79–69	Lexington Catholic	Rupp Arena, Lexington	Antwain Barbour (Elizabethtown)
2001	Lafayette	54–49	Male	Rupp Arena, Lexington	Robert A Madison (Lafayette)
2002	Lexington Catholic	83–53	Paducah Tilghman	Rupp Arena, Lexington	DeMetrius Green (Lexington Catholic)
2003	Mason County	86–65	Ballard	Rupp Arena, Lexington	Chris Lofton (Mason County)
2004	Warren Central	66–56	Mason County	Rupp Arena, Lexington	Brock Whitney (Warren Central)
2005	South Laurel	70–59	Warren Central	Rupp Arena, Lexington	Walt Allen (South Laurel)
2006	Jeffersontown	61–48	Apollo	Rupp Arena, Lexington	Ceedrick Ware (Jeffersontown)
2007	Scott County	56–50	Ballard	Rupp Arena, Lexington	Bud Mackey (Scott County)
2008	Mason County	57–48	Covington Holmes	Rupp Arena, Lexington	Darius Miller (Mason County)
2009	Covington Holmes	67–63 (2OT)	Louisville Central	Rupp Arena, Lexington	Ricardo Johnson (Holmes)
2010	Shelby Valley	73–61	Ballard	Rupp Arena, Lexington	Elisha Justice (Shelby Valley)
2011	Christian County	65–63 (2OT)	Rowan County	Rupp Arena, Lexington	Anthony Hickey (Christian County)
2012	Trinity	71–53	Scott County	Rupp Arena, Lexington	Nathan Dieudonne (Trinity)
2013	Madison Central	65–64	Ballard	Rupp Arena, Lexington	Dominique Hawkins (Madison Central)
2014	Covington Catholic	59–51 (OT)	Scott County	Rupp Arena, Lexington	Nick Ruthsatz (Covington Catholic)
2015	Owensboro	74–58	Bowling Green	Rupp Arena, Lexington	Justin Miller (Owensboro)
2016	Paul Laurence Dunbar	61–52	Doss	Rupp Arena, Lexington	Tavieon Hollingsworth (PLD)
2017	Bowling Green	67–56	Cooper	Rupp Arena, Lexington	Terry Taylor (Bowling Green)
2018	Covington Catholic	73–55	Scott County	Rupp Arena, Lexington	CJ Fredrick (Covington Catholic)
2019	Trinity	50–40	Scott County	Rupp Arena, Lexington	David Johnson (Trinity)
2020	Canceled				
2021	Highlands	79–60	Elizabethtown	Rupp Arena, Lexington	Sam Vinson (Highlands)
2022	George Rogers Clark	43–42	Warren Central	Rupp Arena, Lexington	Jerome Morton (GRC)
2023	Warren Central	64–60	George Rogers Clark	Rupp Arena, Lexington	Chappelle Whitney (Warren Central)
2024	Lyon County	67–58	Harlan County	Rupp Arena, Lexington	Travis Perry (Lyon County)
2025	Great Crossing	71–61	Bowling Green	Rupp Arena, Lexington	Malachi Moreno (Great Crossing)
2026	George Rogers Clark	58-50 (ot)	Saint Xavier	Rupp Arena, Lexington	Malachi Ashford (GRC)

=== Championships, by school ===
KHSAA Boys' Sweet Sixteen State Championships (by school)
School	Titles	Years
Lafayette	6	1942, 1950, 1953, 1957, 1979, 2001
Henry Clay	6	1918, 1919, 1920, 1922, 1924, 1983
Owensboro	5	1917, 1949, 1972, 1980, 2015
Louisville Male	4	1945, 1970, 1971, 1975
St. Xavier	4	1926, 1935, 1958, 1962
Paul G. Blazer (Ashland)	4	1928, 1933, 1934, 1961
DuPont Manual	4	1921, 1923, 1925, 1931
Ballard	3	1977, 1988, 1999
Fairdale	3	1990, 1991, 1994
George Rogers Clark	2	2022, 2026
Warren Central	2	2004, 2023
Trinity	2	2012, 2019
Covington Catholic	2	2014, 2018
Mason County	2	2003, 2008
Scott County	2	1998, 2007
Breckinridge County	2	1965, 1995
Shelby County	2	1966, 1978
Central	2	1969, 1974
Seneca MCA	2	1963, 1964
Hazard	2	1932, 1955
Inez	2	1941, 1954
Lyon County	1	2024
Highlands	1	2021
Bowling Green	1	2017
Paul Laurence Dunbar	1	2016
Madison Central	1	2013
Christian County	1	2011
Shelby Valley	1	2010
Holmes	1	2009
Jeffersontown	1	2006
South Laurel	1	2005
Lexington Catholic	1	2002
Elizabethtown	1	2000
Eastern	1	1997
Paintsville	1	1996
Marion County	1	1993
University Heights	1	1992
Pleasure Ridge Park	1	1989
Clay County	1	1987
Pulaski County	1	1986
Hopkinsville	1	1985
Logan County	1	1984
Laurel County	1	1982
Simon Kenton	1	1981
Edmonson County	1	1976
Shawnee	1	1973
Glasgow	1	1968
Earlington	1	1967
Flaget	1	1960
North Marshall	1	1959
Carr Creek	1	1956
Cuba	1	1952
Clark County High School	1	1951
Brewers	1	1948
Maysville	1	1947
Breckinridge Training	1	1946
Harlan	1	1944
Hindman	1	1943
Hazel Green	1	1940
Brooksville	1	1939
Sharpe	1	1938
Midway	1	1937
Corbin	1	1936
Corinth	1	1930
Heath	1	1929
Millersburg Military Institute	1	1927

== KHSAA Girls' Sweet Sixteen State Champions ==
Year	Champion	Score	Runner-up	Venue	Most Valuable Player
1975	Louisville Butler	60–43	Barren County	McBrayer Arena, Richmond	
1976	Louisville Sacred Heart	68–55	Louisville Butler	McBrayer Arena, Richmond	
1977	Laurel County	48–46	Paris	McBrayer Arena, Richmond	
1978	Laurel County	63–48	Breathitt County	McBrayer Arena, Richmond	
1979	Laurel County	43–36	Lexington Lafayette	McBrayer Arena, Richmond	
1980	Louisville Butler	65–49	Franklin County	McBrayer Arena, Richmond	
1981	Pulaski County	50–42	Marshall County	McBrayer Arena, Richmond	Lori Hines (Pulaski County)
1982	Marshall County	48–44	Louisville Mercy	McBrayer Arena, Richmond	Maria Poschinger (Mercy)
1983	Warren Central	57–49	Whitesburg	McBrayer Arena, Richmond	Clemette Haskins (Warren Central)
1984	Marshall County	55–53	Belfry	McBrayer Arena, Richmond	Carol Parker (Marshall County)
1985	Whitley County	38–37	Louisville Atherton	Diddle Arena, Bowling Green	Anette Jones (Atherton)
1986	Oldham County	49–48	Franklin-Simpson	Diddle Arena, Bowling Green	Nancy Cruthcher (Oldham County)
1987	Laurel County	50–48	Louisville Doss	Diddle Arena, Bowling Green	Joretta Carney (Laurel County)
1988	Louisville Southern	57–34	Oldham County	Civic Center, Frankfort	Lisa Harrison (Southern)
1989	Clay County	48–44	George Rogers Clark	Civic Center, Frankfort	Kim Jones (Clay County)
1990	Lexington Henry Clay	62–50	Louisville Southern	Diddle Arena, Bowling Green	Demetria Bright (Henry Clay)
1991	Laurel County	33–31	George Rogers Clark	Civic Center, Frankfort	Stacey Reed (Laurel County)
1992	Louisville Mercy	44–38	Clay County	McBrayer Arena, Richmond	Christina Jansen (Mercy)
1993	Nicholas County	48–46	Warren East	Civic Center, Frankfort	Kim Denkins (Nicholas County)
1994	M.C. Napier	88–56	Fort Thomas Highlands	Diddle Arena, Bowling Green	Kristie Combs (M.C. Napier)
1995	Scott County	68–45	Pulaski County	Civic Center, Frankfort	Ukari Figgs (Scott County)
1996	Union County	44–37	Central Hardin	Diddle Arena, Bowling Green	Rachel Byers (Union County)
1997	Hazard	54–38	Elizabethtown	Civic Center, Frankfort	Charlotte Sizemore (Hazard)
1998	Elizabethtown	45–37	Montgomery County	McBrayer Arena, Richmond	Falesha Robertson (Elizabethtown)
1999	Lexington Catholic	57–42	Louisville Assumption	Diddle Arena, Bowling Green	Kelly Stamper (Lexington Catholic)
2000	West Carter	58–50	Shelby County	McBrayer Arena, Richmond	Kandi Brown (West Carter)
2001	Lexington Catholic	36–34	Louisville Manual	Diddle Arena, Bowling Green	Chelsea Crowning (Lexington Catholic)
2002	Louisville Sacred Heart	57–46	Jackson County	Diddle Arena, Bowling Green	Carly Ormerod (Sacred Heart)
2003	Louisville Sacred Heart	42–40	Lexington Catholic	Diddle Arena, Bowling Green	Crystal Kelly (Sacred Heart)
2004	Louisville Sacred Heart	43–34	Lexington Catholic	Diddle Arena, Bowling Green	Carly Ormerod (Sacred Heart)
2005	Lexington Catholic	59–54	Clinton County	Diddle Arena, Bowling Green	Anaris Sickles (Lexington Catholic)
2006	Lexington Catholic	69–52	Rose Hill Christian	Diddle Arena, Bowling Green	Keyla Snowden (Lexington Catholic)
2007	Lexington Christian	71–62	Louisville Iroquois	Diddle Arena, Bowling Green	Emily London (Lexington Christian)
2008	Louisville Butler	58–57	Franklin-Simpson	Diddle Arena, Bowling Green	Tia Gibbs (Butler)
2009	Louisville Iroquois	55–47	Elizabethtown	Diddle Arena, Bowling Green	Adia Mathies (Iroquois)
2010	Louisville Mercy	71–61	Scott County	Diddle Arena, Bowling Green	Ellen Scholtes (Mercy)
2011	Rockcastle County	62–60	Louisville Manual	Diddle Arena, Bowling Green	Sara Hammond (Rockcastle County)
2012	Louisville Manual	58–54	Marion County	Diddle Arena, Bowling Green	April Wilson (Manual)
2013	Marion County	52–36	Notre Dame	Diddle Arena, Bowling Green	Makayla Epps (Marion County)
2014	Louisville Butler	49–38	Elizabethtown	Diddle Arena, Bowling Green	Danielle Lawrence (Butler)
2015	Covington Holy Cross	35–32	Allen County-Scottsville	Diddle Arena, Bowling Green	Deja Turner (Holy Cross)
2016	Louisville Butler	62–36	Franklin County	BB&T Arena, Highland Heights	Jaelynn Penn (Butler)
2017	Mercer County	85–71	Franklin County	BB&T Arena, Highland Heights	Seygan Robins (Mercer County)
2018	Mercer County	74–34	Mercy	BB&T Arena, Highland Heights	Seygan Robins (Mercer County)
2019	Ryle	63–48	Southwestern	Rupp Arena, Lexington	Maddie Scherr (Ryle)
2020	Cancelled				
2021	Louisville Sacred Heart	49–47	Marshall County	Rupp Arena, Lexington	Josie Gilvin (Sacred Heart)
2022	Louisville Sacred Heart	64–46	Bullitt East	Rupp Arena, Lexington	Za'Kiyah Johnson (Sacred Heart)
2023	Louisville Sacred Heart	68–53	McCracken County	Rupp Arena, Lexington	Za'Kiyah Johnson (Sacred Heart)
2024	Louisville Sacred Heart	60-49	McCracken County	Rupp Arena, Lexington	Za'Kiyah Johnson (Sacred Heart)
2025	Louisville Sacred Heart	65-60	George Rogers Clark	Rupp Arena, Lexington	Za'Kiyah Johnson (Sacred Heart)
2026	George Rogers Clark	48-43	Louisville Assumption	Rupp Arena, Lexington	Teigh Yeast (GRC)

== Schools with at least three boys' state championships ==
Rank	School	Titles	Years won
1	Lexington Lafayette	6	1942, 1950, 1953, 1957, 1979, 2001
1	Lexington Henry Clay	6	1918, 1919, 1920, 1922, 1924, 1983
3	Owensboro	5	1917, 1949, 1972, 1980, 2015
4	Ashland	4	1928, 1933, 1934, 1961
4	Louisville Male	4	1945, 1970, 1971, 1975
4	Louisville Manual	4	1921, 1923, 1925, 1931
4	Louisville St. Xavier	4	1926, 1935, 1958, 1962
8	Louisville Ballard	3	1977, 1988, 1999
8	Louisville Fairdale	3	1990, 1991, 1994

== Schools with at least two girls' state championships ==
Rank	School	Titles	Years won
1	Louisville Sacred Heart	9	1976, 2002, 2003, 2004, 2021, 2022, 2023, 2024, 2025
2	Louisville Butler	5	1975, 1980, 2008, 2014, 2016
2	Laurel County	5	1977, 1978, 1979, 1987, 1991
4	Lexington Catholic	4	1999, 2001, 2005, 2006
5	Louisville Mercy	2	1992, 2010
5	Marshall County	2	1982, 1984
5	Mercer County	2	2017, 2018
