= Kentucky Mr. Basketball =

Honor awarded to high school basketball players

The Kentucky Mr. Basketball honor recognizes the top male high school basketball player in the state of Kentucky. The Kentucky Mr. Basketball award is the third oldest such award in the nation, being first awarded in 1954; only Indiana Mr. Basketball and California Mr. Basketball, which were first awarded in 1939 and 1950 respectively, predate it. The award is presented annually by the Kentucky Lions Eye Foundation.

The winner of the Mr. Basketball award wears #1 on his jersey in the summer all-star series against the Indiana High School All-Stars. 1940 was the inaugural year for the Kentucky/Indiana High School All-Star Series; in that year, the Indiana All-Stars defeated the Kentucky All-Stars 31–29.

== Award winners ==
Year	Player	High School	College	NBA Draft
1954	Vernon Hatton	Lafayette	Kentucky	1958 NBA draft: 2nd round, 10th overall by the Cincinnati Royals
1955	Kenny Kuhn	Male		
1956	Kelly Coleman	Wayland (Note: Consolidated into Allen Central High School, which in turn was consolidated into today's Floyd Central High School.)	Kentucky Wesleyan	1960 NBA draft: 2nd round, 11th overall by the New York Knicks
1957	Billy Ray Lickert	Lafayette	Kentucky	1961 NBA draft: 5th round, 45th overall by the L.A. Lakers
1958 (tie)	Ralph Richardson	Russell County	Eastern Kentucky	
1958 (tie)	Harry Todd	Earlington (Note: Consolidated into South Hopkins and West Hopkins High Schools, which in turn were consolidated into Hopkins County Central High School.)	Western Kentucky	
1959	Pat Doyle	North Marshall (Note: Consolidated into Marshall County High School.)	Kentucky	
1960	Jeff Mullins	Lafayette	Duke	1964 NBA draft: 1st round, 5th overall by the St. Louis Hawks
1961	Randy Embry	Owensboro	Kentucky	
1962	Mike Silliman	St. Xavier	Army	1966 NBA draft: 8th round, 69th overall by the New York Knicks
1963	Mike R. Redd	Seneca	Kentucky Wesleyan	
1964	Wes Unseld	Seneca	Louisville	1968 NBA draft: 1st round, 2nd overall by the Baltimore Bullets
1965	Butch Beard	Breckinridge County	Louisville	1969 NBA draft: 1st round, 10th overall by the Atlanta Hawks
1966	Mike Casey	Shelby County	Kentucky	
1967	Jim McDaniels	Allen County (Note: Consolidated into Allen County Scottsville High School.)	Western Kentucky	1971 NBA draft: 2nd round, 23rd overall by the Seattle SuperSonics
1968	Terry Davis	Shelby County	Western Kentucky	
1969	Ron King	Central	Florida State	
1970	Robert Brooks	Madison (Note: Closed in 1989; its former attendance zone is now served by Madison Central High School.)	Eastern Kentucky	
1971	Jimmy Dan Conner	Anderson County	Kentucky	1975 NBA draft: 2nd round, 36th overall by the Phoenix Suns
1972	Jerry Thruston	Owensboro	Mercer	
1973	Wesley Cox	Male	Louisville	1977 NBA draft: 1st round, 18th overall by the Golden State Warriors
1974	Jack Givens	Bryan Station	Kentucky	1978 NBA draft: 1st round, 16th overall by the Atlanta Hawks
1975	Dom Fucci	Tates Creek	Auburn	
1976	Darrell Griffith	Male	Louisville	1980 NBA draft: 1st round, 2nd overall by the Utah Jazz
1977	Jeff Lamp	Ballard (Note: Located in Louisville; not to be confused with Ballard Memorial High School, which serves Ballard County in the far-west Purchase.)	Virginia	1981 NBA draft: 1st round, 15th overall by the Portland Trail Blazers
1978	Doug Schloemer	Holmes	Cincinnati	
1979	Dirk Minniefield	Lafayette	Kentucky	1983 NBA draft: 2nd round, 33rd overall by the Dallas Mavericks
1980	Ervin Stepp	Phelps	Eastern Kentucky; Alice Lloyd College	
1981	Phil Cox	Cawood (Note: Consolidated into Harlan County High School.)	Vanderbilt	
1982	Todd May	Virgie (Note: Consolidated into Shelby Valley High School.)	Kentucky; Pikeville	1987 NBA draft: 4th round, 73rd overall by the San Antonio Spurs
1983	Winston Bennett	Male	Kentucky	1988 NBA draft: 3rd round, 64th overall by the Cleveland Cavaliers
1984	Steve Miller	Henry Clay	Western Kentucky	
1985	Tony Kimbro	Seneca	Louisville	
1986	Rex Chapman	Apollo	Kentucky	1988 NBA draft: 1st round, 8th overall by the Charlotte Hornets
1987	John Pelphrey	Paintsville	Kentucky	
1988	Richie Farmer	Clay County	Kentucky	
1989	Allan Houston	Ballard	Tennessee	1993 NBA draft: 1st round, 11th overall by the Detroit Pistons
1990	Dwayne Morton	Louisville Central	Louisville	1994 NBA draft: 2nd round, 45th overall by the Golden State Warriors
1991	Jermaine Brown	Fairdale	Georgetown (KY)	
1992	Tick Rogers	Hart County	Louisville	
1993	Jason Osborne	Male	Louisville	
1994	Elton Scott	Marion County	West Virginia	
1995	Charles Thomas	Harlan (Note: Operated by the Harlan city school district and distinct from Harlan County High School, which is operated by the Harlan County school district.)	Eastern Kentucky	
1996	Daymeon Fishback	Greenwood	Auburn	
1997	Brandon Davenport	Owensboro	Morehead State	
1998	J. R. VanHoose	Paintsville	Marshall	
1999	Rick Jones	Scott County	Vanderbilt; Murray State	
2000	Scott Hundley	Scott County	Vanderbilt	
2001	Josh Carrier	Bowling Green	Kentucky	
2002	Brandon Stockton	Glasgow	Kentucky	
2003	Ross Neltner	Highlands	LSU; Vanderbilt	
2004	Chris Lofton	Mason County	Tennessee	
2005	Domonic Tilford	Jeffersontown	South Alabama	
2006	Walt Allen	South Laurel	Presbyterian	
2007	Steffphon Pettigrew	Elizabethtown	Western Kentucky	
2008	Darius Miller	Mason County	Kentucky	2012 NBA draft: 2nd round, 46th overall by the New Orleans Hornets
2009	Jon Hood	Madisonville North Hopkins	Kentucky	
2010	Elisha Justice	Shelby Valley	Louisville; Pikeville	
2011	Anthony Hickey	Christian County	LSU; Oklahoma State	
2012	Nathan Dieudonne	Trinity	Boston University	
2013	Dominique Hawkins	Madison Central	Kentucky	
2014	Quentin Snider	Ballard	Louisville	
2015	Camron Justice	Knott County Central	Vanderbilt; IUPUI; Western Kentucky	
2016	Carson Williams	Owen County	Northern Kentucky; Western Kentucky	
2017	Taveion Hollingsworth	Dunbar	Western Kentucky	
2018	Trevon Faulkner	Mercer County	Northern Kentucky	
2019	Dontaie Allen	Pendleton County	Kentucky; Western Kentucky	
2020	Dayvion McKnight	Martha Layne Collins	Western Kentucky	
2021	Ben Johnson	Lexington Catholic	Bellarmine	
2022	Turner Buttry	Bowling Green	Eastern Kentucky	
2023	Reed Sheppard	North Laurel	Kentucky	2024 NBA draft: 1st round, 3rd overall by the Houston Rockets
2024	Travis Perry	Lyon County	Kentucky	
2025	Malachi Moreno	Great Crossing	Kentucky	
2026	Jake Feldhaus	Madison Central	South Florida	

=== Schools with multiple winners ===
School	Number of Awards	Years
Male	5	1955, 1973, 1976, 1983, 1993
Lafayette	4	1954, 1957, 1960, 1979
Ballard	3	1977, 1989, 2014
Owensboro	3	1961, 1972, 1997
Seneca	3	1963, 1964, 1985
Shelby Valley	2	1982, 2010
Mason County	2	2004, 2008
Bowling Green	2	2001, 2022
Scott County	2	1999, 2000
Paintsville	2	1987, 1998
Shelby County	2	1966, 1968
Madison Central	2	2013, 2026

Reflects awards won by schools that have since been consolidated.

=== Colleges with multiple winners ===
College	Number of Awards	Years
Kentucky	22	1954, 1957, 1959, 1961, 1966, 1971, 1974, 1979, 1982, 1983, 1986, 1987, 1988, 2001, 2002, 2008, 2009, 2013, 2019, 2023, 2024, 2025
Louisville	10	1964, 1965, 1973, 1976, 1985, 1990, 1992, 1993, 2010, 2014
Western Kentucky	9	1958, 1967, 1968, 1984, 2007, 2015, 2016, 2017, 2020
Vanderbilt	5	1981, 1999, 2000, 2003, 2015
Eastern Kentucky	5	1958, 1970, 1980, 1995, 2022
Northern Kentucky	2	2016, 2018
LSU	2	2003, 2011
Pikeville	2	1982, 2010
Tennessee	2	1989, 2004
Auburn	2	1975, 1996
Kentucky Wesleyan	2	1956, 1963

== See also ==
- Kentucky Miss Basketball
- Mr. Football Award (Kentucky)
