= Elisha Justice =

American basketball player and coach

Personal information
- Born: December 17, 1990 (age 35) Dorton, Kentucky, U.S.
- Listed height: 5 ft 10 in (1.78 m)
- Listed weight: 170 lb (77 kg)

Career information
- High school: Shelby Valley High School (Pike County, Kentucky)
- College: Louisville (2010–2012); Pikeville (2012–2014)
- Position: Guard

Career highlights
- Kentucky Mr. Basketball (2010)

Elisha Justice (born December 17, 1990) is an American basketball coach and a former high school and college basketball player.

In 2010, his team won the Kentucky state championship and Justice was named tournament MVP as well as the 2010 Kentucky Mr. Basketball. He played for two years at the University of Louisville. In his second year, the team won the Big East tournament and made it to the Final Four.

Justice has been a high school basketball coach since 2014. In 2022, he was inducted into the Kentucky High School Basketball Hall of Fame.

== Early life and education ==
Justice was born in Dorton, Kentucky on December 17, 1990, the second of 3 children to Joey and Robin Justice.

Justice attended Shelby Valley High School where he played for the Wildcats. In 2010, the Wildcats won the Kentucky state championship. It was Justice's third trip to the Sweet Sixteen where he was named tournament MVP. The same year, Justice was named the 2010 Kentucky Mr. Basketball. He also finished 7th in the voting for the 2010 Kentucky Sportsman of the Year and finished his high school career with the state record for steals.

Justice played for the University of Louisville for two years. In his sophomore year, the team won the Big East tournament and made it to the Final Four. Justice transferred to the University of Pikeville to be closer to home and family. There, he finished his college career and his final two years of eligibility.

== Coaching career ==
Justice became the head boys basketball coach of June Buchanan School in Pippa Passes, Kentucky in 2014. This was followed by the head coaching job at Pikeville High School in 2016.

In 2021–2022, Pikeville Panthers won their 15th regional title under Justice as well as the All “A” state championship. In 2024, Justice coached his 200th high school basketball game.

== Honors ==
- Kentucky Mr. Basketball (2010)
- Kentucky High School Basketball Hall of Fame (2022)
