= Travis Perry =

American basketball player (born 2005)

Dayton Flyers
- Position: Point guard
- Conference: Atlantic 10 Conference

Personal information
- Born: April 20, 2005 (age 21) Lexington, Kentucky, U.S.
- Listed height: 6 ft 1 in (1.85 m)
- Listed weight: 185 lb (84 kg)

Career information
- High school: Lyon County (Eddyville, Kentucky)
- College: Kentucky (2024–2025); Ole Miss (2025–2026); Dayton (2026–present)

Career highlights
- Kentucky Mr. Basketball (2024)

Travis Perry (born April 20, 2005) is an American college basketball player for the Dayton Flyers of the Atlantic 10 Conference. He previously played for the Kentucky Wildcats and Ole Miss Rebels.

== Early life and high school ==
Perry grew up in Eddyville, Kentucky and attended Lyon County High School. He began playing for Lyon County's varsity basketball team while he was in the seventh grade. Perry was named Kentucky Mr. Basketball after averaging 32.2 points, 6.2 rebounds, 5.8 assists, and 4.7 steals per game as a senior. He was also named the MVP of the KHSAA Sweet Sixteen after scoring 27 points in Lyon County's 67–58 win over Harlan County High School in the state championship game. Perry finished his high school career with a state-record 5,381 career points.

Perry was rated a consensus four-star recruit and committed to play college basketball at Kentucky over offers from Alabama, Cincinnati, Ole Miss, and Western Kentucky. He signed a National Letter of Intent (NLI) to play for the Wildcats on November 15, 2023, during the early signing period. Perry later reaffirmed his commitment to Kentucky after head coach John Calipari left the program to become the head coach at Arkansas.

== College career ==
Perry enrolled at the University of Kentucky in June 2024 in order to take part in the Wildcats' summer practices. He played sparingly for Kentucky, averaging 2.7 points per game. Following the season Perry transferred to Ole Miss. He averaged 5.3 points, 1.6 rebounds and 1.1 assists per game for the Rebels. Perry transferred again after the season, this time to Dayton.

== Career statistics ==
Legend
GP	Games played	GS	Games started	MPG	Minutes per game
FG%	Field goal percentage	3P%	3-point field goal percentage	FT%	Free throw percentage
RPG	Rebounds per game	APG	Assists per game	SPG	Steals per game
BPG	Blocks per game	PPG	Points per game	**Bold**	Career high

=== College ===
Year	Team	GP	GS	MPG	FG%	3P%	FT%	RPG	APG	SPG	BPG	PPG
2024–25	Kentucky	31	4	9.7	.313	.321	.800	.8	.6	.4	.0	2.7
2025–26	Ole Miss	35	16	16.5	.343	.353	.880	1.6	1.1	.8	.1	5.3
