= Shelby County Public Schools =

School district in Kentucky, United States

Coordinates: 38.211836°N 85.22836°W

Address
- P.O. Box 159; 1155 West Main Street; Shelbyville, KY 40066-0159 United States

District information
- Superintendent: Joshua Matthews

Other information
- Website: www.shelby.kyschools.us

Shelby County Public Schools is a school district based in Shelbyville, Kentucky, which serves Shelby County.

== Schools ==
The district operates the following schools:

- Elementary Schools
  - Clear Creek Elementary School
  - Heritage Elementary School
  - Painted Stone Elementary School
  - Simpsonville Elementary School
  - Southside Elementary School
  - Wright Elementary School
- Middle Schools
  - Shelby County East Middle School
  - Shelby County West Middle School
- High Schools
  - Martha Layne Collins High School
  - Shelby County High School
- Other
  - Marnel C Moorman K-8 School
  - Northside Early Childhood Center (Pre-K)
  - Shelby Academy
  - Area Technology Center
