= Jim Rose (basketball) =

American basketball player (1947–2009)

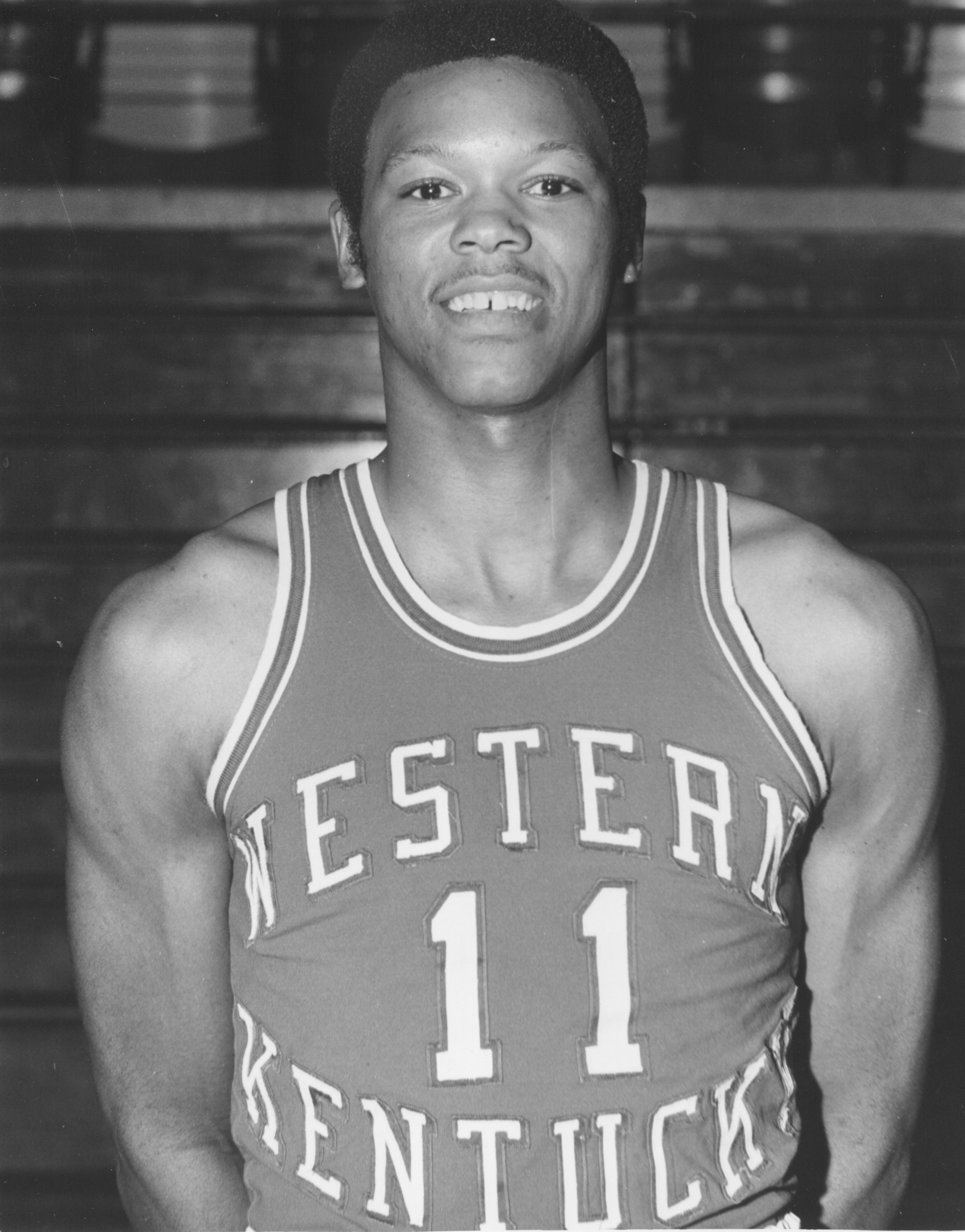
- Rose at Western Kentucky University

Personal information
- Born: May 26, 1947 Hazard, Kentucky, U.S.
- Died: June 30, 2009 (aged 62)
- Listed height: 6 ft 3 in (1.91 m)
- Listed weight: 185 lb (84 kg)

Career information
- High school: Hazard (Hazard, Kentucky)
- College: Western Kentucky (1968–1971)
- NBA draft: 1971: 2nd round, 28th overall pick
- Drafted by: Boston Celtics
- Position: Shooting guard
- Number: 11

Career highlights
- 2× Fourth-team Parade All-American (1966, 1967)
- Stats at Basketball Reference

Jim Rose (May 26, 1947 – June 30, 2009) was an American professional basketball player. After playing college basketball for the Western Kentucky Hilltoppers (1968–1971), Rose was the eleventh overall pick (2nd round) of the Boston Celtics of the National Basketball Association in the 1971 NBA draft.

== Early life ==
Rose graduated from Hazard High School in Hazard, Kentucky, where he was named a Parade All-American.

After originally committing to the Houston Cougars, the press release on May 18, 1967, read as follows: "Western Kentucky signed its third all-state basketball player, Jim Rose of Hazard, Ky., to a grant-in-aid yesterday. ROSE, a 6-3, 175-pound guard, averaged 24.9 points and 14 rebounds last season. He was a first team all-stater in 1965 and 1967 and slipped to the Cage Standout second team, in 1966. He was named to the Kentucky All-State Tournament Kentucky team as a freshman and was a fourth team All-American this year."

Rose led Hazard High School to three straight Sweet 16 appearances in the Kentucky State High School Basketball Tournament, in 1964, 1965 and 1966 and scored 141 points in his career in the Kentucky State High School Basketball Tournament. Rose was named All-State in his final three high school seasons.

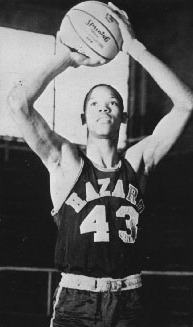
Jim Rose at Hazard High School

== College career ==
Rose played college basketball at Western Kentucky University, from 1967 to 1971 under Coach John Oldham.

In 1969–1970, Rose averaged 14.0 points, 4.9 rebounds and 2.6 assists as the Hilltoppers finished 22–3, losing to Jacksonville 109–96 in the 1970 NCAA University Division basketball tournament.

As a Senior, in 1970–1971, Rose averaged 15.4 points 4.8 rebounds and 2.9 assists. The Hilltoppers finished 25-6 and advanced to the Final Four of the 1971 NCAA University Division basketball tournament. Playing with teammates Clarence Glover (#10 pick in 1971 NBA draft), Jim McDaniels (#23 pick in 1971 NBA draft and Jerry Dunn, the Hilltoppers revenged their 1970 loss to Jacksonville University with Artis Gilmore, winning 74–72. Western Kentucky then had a convincing 107–83 win over Coach Adolph Rupp and his University of Kentucky Wildcats. Western Kentucky defeated Ohio State 81–78, before losing in double overtime to Villanova University in the semi-finals 92–89. In the NCAA 3rd place game, they defeated the University of Kansas 77–75, finishing 24–6.

Rose had 25 points in the victory over Kentucky, 18 points and 8 rebounds points in the Final Four loss to Villanova. Rose scored 11 points in the victory over Kansas. He averaged 16.0 points, 5.2 rebounds and 3 assists in the tournament.

With Rose, Western Kentucky, finished 16–10 in 1968–1969, 22–3 in 1969–1970, playing in the 1970 NCAA University Division basketball tournament and 25–6 in 1970–1971, as the Hilltoppers finished 3rd in the 1971 NCAA University Division basketball tournament.

In his career for Western Kentucky, Rose averaged 14.0 points, 5.3 rebounds and 2.8 assists in 81 career games.

== Professional career ==
Rose was drafted 28th overall by the Boston Celtics in the 1971 NBA draft, but never appeared in an NBA regular season game. Rose was also drafted by the Memphis Tams in the second round of the 1971 American Basketball Association.

On September 1, 1974, the Boston Celtics renounced their draft rights on Rose.

== Honors ==
- Jim Rose was inducted into the Western Kentucky University Athletic Hall of Fame on October 14, 2017.
- Rose was inducted into the Kentucky High School Basketball Hall Of Fame in 2016.
- Rose is the namesake of the Kentucky High School Basketball tournament, The Jim Rose Central Bank Classic.

== Personal ==
Rose died on June 30, 2009, at Holston Valley Hospital in Kingsport, Tennessee. He is buried in Hazard, Kentucky.
