= Dorton, Kentucky =

Unincorporated community in Kentucky, United States

Dorton
- Unincorporated community
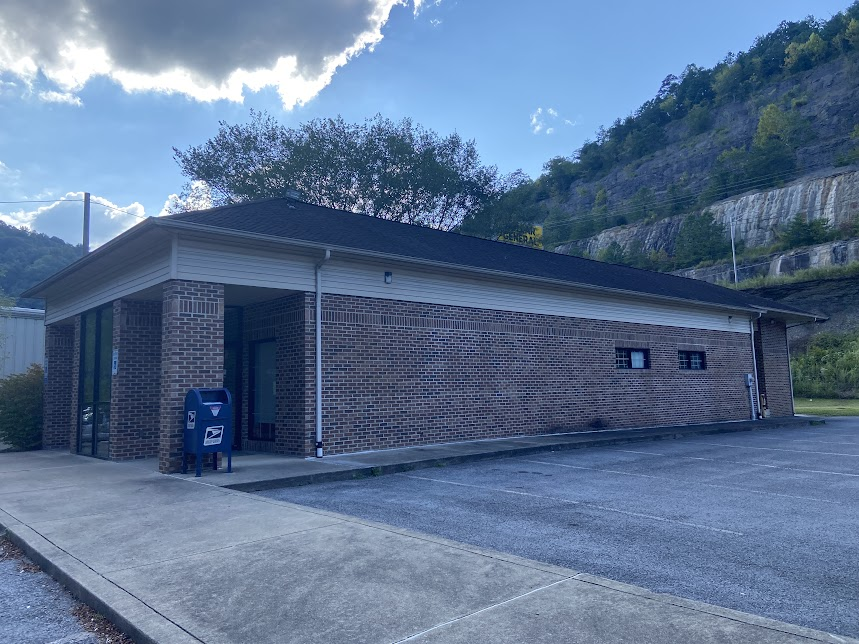
- Dorton post office

- Location within the state of Kentucky Dorton (the United States)
- Coordinates: 37°16′36″N 82°34′45″W
- Country: United States
- State: Kentucky
- County: Pike
- Elevation: 1,024 ft (312 m)
- Time zone: UTC-5 (Eastern (EST))
  - Summer (DST): UTC-4 (EST)
- ZIP codes: 41520
- Area code: 606
- GNIS feature ID: 491021

Dorton is an unincorporated community and former coal town in southern Pike County, Kentucky, United States. Located along U.S. Route 23, also known as Country Music Highway. It is centered at the confluence of Dorton and Shelby Creeks and the junction of U.S. 23 and KY 610, 13 miles south of Pikeville.

Dorton Elementary School is located in the community. Dorton High School closed its doors at the conclusion of the 1989–90 school year when it consolidated with neighboring Virgie High School, forming Shelby Valley High School.

== Education ==
Most students residing in Dorton attend:

- Dorton Elementary School
- Shelby Valley High School
