= Jim McDaniels =

American basketball player (1948–2017)

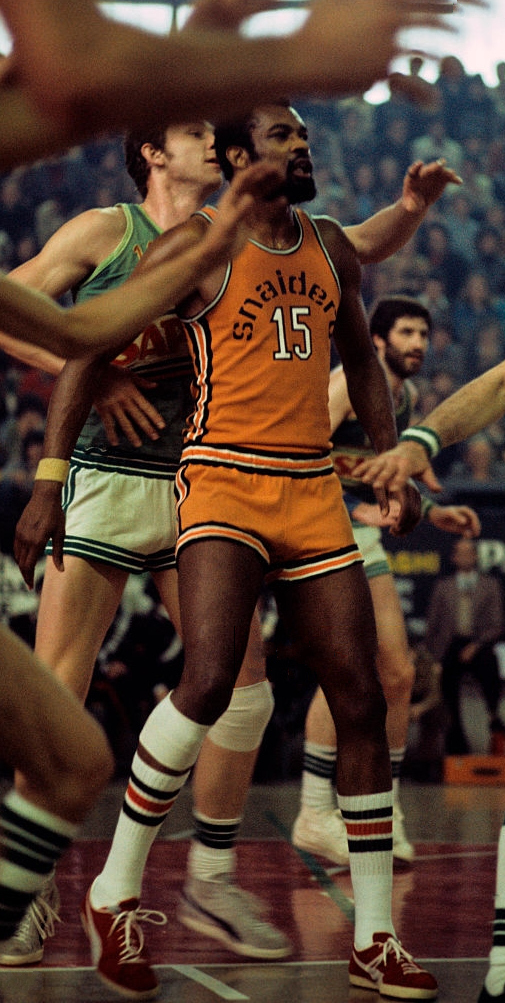
- McDaniels (#15) with Snaidero Udine in Italy, 1975

Personal information
- Born: April 2, 1948 Scottsville, Kentucky, U.S.
- Died: September 6, 2017 (aged 69) Bowling Green, Kentucky, U.S.
- Listed height: 6 ft 11 in (2.11 m)
- Listed weight: 228 lb (103 kg)

Career information
- High school: Allen County (Scottsville, Kentucky)
- College: Western Kentucky (1968–1971)
- NBA draft: 1971: 2nd round, 23rd overall pick
- Drafted by: Seattle SuperSonics
- Playing career: 1971–1978
- Position: Power forward / center
- Number: 1, 44, 11, 45

Career history
- 1971–1972: Carolina Cougars
- 1972–1973: Seattle SuperSonics
- 1974–1975: Udinese
- 1975–1976: Los Angeles Lakers
- 1976: Kentucky Colonels
- 1977–1978: Buffalo Braves

Career highlights
- ABA All-Star (1972); Consensus first-team All-American (1971); 2× OVC Player of the Year (1970, 1971); No. 44 jersey retired by Western Kentucky Hilltoppers; First-team Parade All-American (1967); Kentucky Mr. Basketball (1967)

Career ABA and NBA statistics
- Points: 2,698 (10.0 ppg)
- Rebounds: 1,748 (6.5 rpg)
- Assists: 288 (1.1 apg)
- Stats at NBA.com
- Stats at Basketball Reference

James Ronald McDaniels (April 2, 1948 – September 6, 2017) was an American professional basketball player. He played collegiately for Western Kentucky University and was the number one overall pick in the 1971 American Basketball Association Draft. McDaniels played as an ABA All-Star in 1972.

== High school and college careers ==
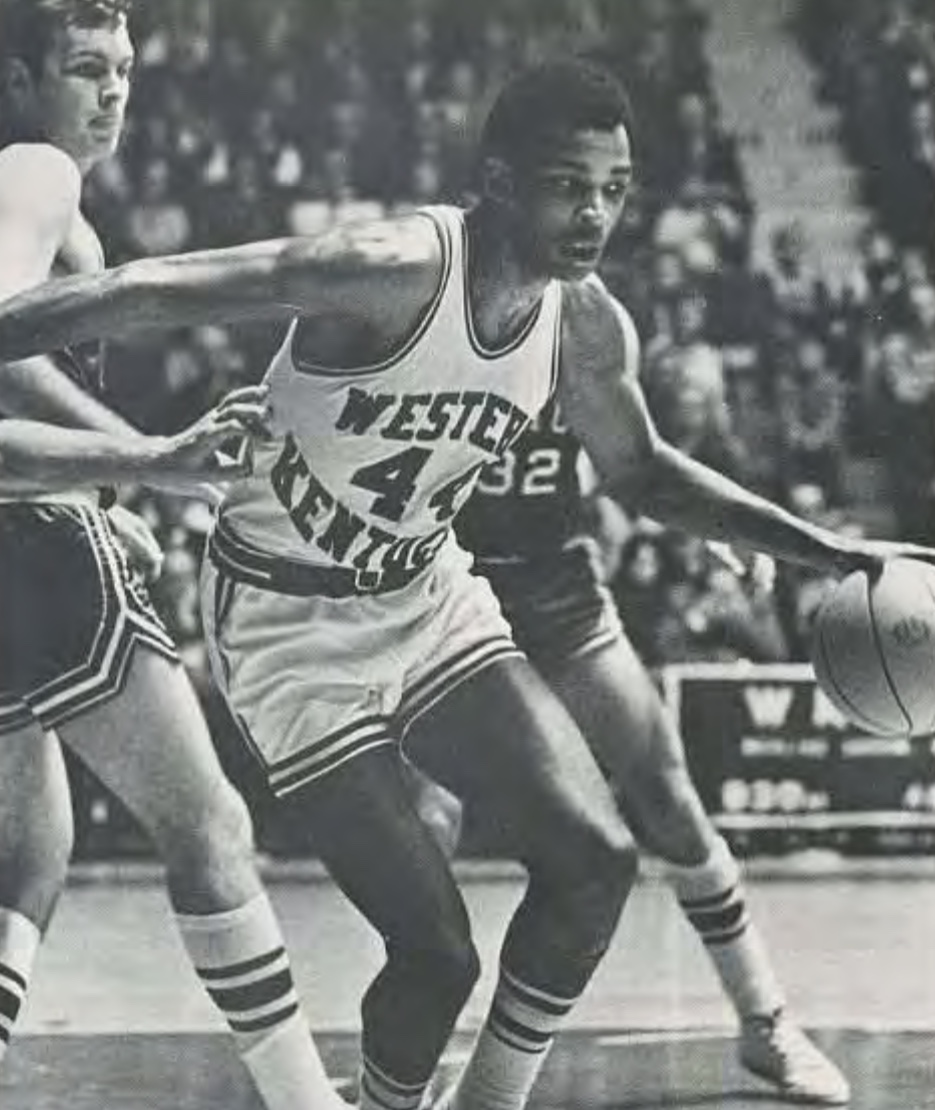
McDaniels at WKU.

A 6'11" power forward/center, McDaniels averaged nearly 40 points per game as a senior at Allen County High School in Scottsville, Kentucky. In 1967, he was honored as Kentucky Mr. Basketball. From 1967 to 1971, he played at Western Kentucky University, leading his team to a third-place finish in the 1971 NCAA Men's Division I Basketball Tournament. (The NCAA later voided Western Kentucky's participation in the tournament, accusing McDaniels of signing with an agent while still in college.) He also set WKU school records with 2,238 career points (now tied with Courtney Lee) and 1,118 career rebounds.

McDaniels' Western Kentucky University jersey, #44, was retired by his alma mater in January 2000.

== Professional career ==
Citing "informed sources", Jet magazine reported in February 1971 that, in an era where the American Basketball Association (ABA) was conducting a secret draft, "McDaniels was drafted by the [ABA's] Utah Stars". Other sources indicate that McDaniels was, rather, the number one overall draft pick of the Dallas Chaparrals in the 1971 American Basketball Association Draft, and was drafted by the Seattle SuperSonics in the second round of the 1971 NBA draft.

In any case, McDaniels began his professional career with the Carolina Cougars of the American Basketball Association, who offered him a $1.35 million contract to be paid over 25 years; the Cougars are reported to have first approached McDaniels during November 1970, while he was still playing for Western Kentucky. McDaniels averaged 26.8 points and 14 rebounds in 58 games with the Cougars during the 1971–72 season, and scored 24 points and grabbed 11 rebounds in the 1972 ABA All-Star Game.

However, he parted ways with the Cougars after trying to renegotiate his contract; according to a lawsuit filed by the Cougars (as reported by The New York Times), McDaniels had asked that his salary be spread over 15 rather than 25 years, and that he be given "an additional $50,000 for aggravation". In a report from Seattle, carried by the Associated Press (AP), it was announced that the SuperSonics had signed McDaniels on February 17 (1972), that is, near the end of his rookie season; a Cougars' spokesman commented that "he 'wouldn't be too surprised if [the Cougars yet] remedied the situation'".

McDaniels remained with Seattle for the next two full seasons. However, he struggled to maintain the same level of production he had achieved in the ABA, and by the 1973–74 NBA season, McDaniels was averaging just 5.5 points per game. During that time, McDaniels was dogged by off-court troubles as the Cougars questioned the legality of his jump to the NBA. He later admitted in an interview, "I should have stayed in the ABA for a couple of years. I was just young and things started going bad for me there and I didn't know how to handle them."

SuperSonics coach and general manager Bill Russell ultimately released McDaniels in fall 1974. For the next four years, McDaniels bounced from team to team, playing for the Los Angeles Lakers and Buffalo Braves of the NBA, the Kentucky Colonels of the ABA, and Snaidero Udine of Italy. He decided to retire from basketball in 1978.

== Personal life ==
McDaniels was a native of Scottsville, Kentucky and attended Allen County High School. At the time of his death, McDaniels was married to his wife Carolyn; he was survived by two sons from previous marriages, Eskias and Shannon.

McDaniels died in Bowling Green, Kentucky at the age of 69, due to complications from diabetes.

== Cultural relevance ==
The 1971 Western Kentucky Hilltoppers basketball team was the first non-historically black, Kentucky collegiate basketball team to start five African-American players. Coach John Oldham started McDaniels, Jim Rose, Clarence Glover, Jerry Dunn and Rex Bailey. McDaniels had helped recruit Rose and the others after signing at WKU. Oldham was pressured not to start all five together, but said "they are my best five players."

== See also ==
- List of NCAA Division I men's basketball players with 2,000 points and 1,000 rebounds
