= Kelly Coleman =

American basketball player (1938–2019)

Personal information
- Born: September 21, 1938 Wayland, Kentucky, U.S.
- Died: June 16, 2019 (aged 80) Hazard, Kentucky, U.S.
- Listed height: 6 ft 4 in (1.93 m)
- Listed weight: 215 lb (98 kg)

Career information
- High school: Wayland (Wayland, Kentucky)
- College: Kentucky Wesleyan (1957–1960)
- NBA draft: 1960: 2nd round, 11th overall pick
- Drafted by: New York Knicks
- Playing career: 1960–1963
- Position: Forward
- Number: 45, 35, 66

Career history
- 1960–1961: Baltimore Bullets
- 1961–1963: Chicago Majors
- 1963: Harlem Globetrotters

Career highlights
- EPBL champion (1961); 2× NCAA All-American (1959, 1960); No. 45 retired by Kentucky Wesleyan Panthers; Kentucky Mr. Basketball (1956)
- Stats at Basketball Reference

Kelly "King" Coleman (September 21, 1938 – June 16, 2019) was an American professional basketball player. Coleman was a record scorer at Kentucky Wesleyan College and Wayland High School (Kentucky). Coleman was the #11 overall pick of the New York Knicks in the 1960 NBA draft, after averaging 30.3 points per game as a senior at Kentucky Wesleyan. He played two seasons in the American Basketball League. Coleman's 4,337 career points stood as the Kentucky state record for All-Time points for nearly seven decades.

== Early life ==
Kelly was one of eleven children of Guy and Rusha Coleman. Guy Coleman supported the family by working in the local coal mines. Kelly attended Wayland High School in Wayland, Kentucky.

== High school career 1953–1956 ==
Coleman had a record setting career at Wayland High School. In his high school career, Coleman scored 4,337 total points from 1953 to 1956, which was the national record at the time and until 2023 remained the highest in Kentucky high school history. In 1956, "King Kelly" Coleman was named Kentucky Mr. Basketball.

In 1956, Coleman was considered by many as the best high school basketball player in the nation, ranking with Oscar Robertson and Jerry West. As a senior in the 1955–56 season, Coleman scored 1,919 total points, an average of 46.8 points per game. His 4,337 career points in high school broke Wilt Chamberlain's national record for most points scored in a career.

In the recruiting process, Naismith Basketball Hall of Fame inductee and University of Kentucky head coach Adolph Rupp publicly called Coleman the best high school basketball player of all time. Rupp said, "the greatest high school player who ever lived...A combination of Cliff Hagan, Frank Ramsey, and all of the other great stars who have played at Kentucky." Today, he is still considered "without question the greatest Kentucky high school prepster of all time."

At the 1956 Kentucky state high school tournament, Coleman was so popular that his arrival in Lexington, Kentucky for the tournament was marked by flyers dropped from a plane that said: “King Kelly’s coming to town.”

In the state tournament, Coleman scored 68 points against Bell County and then had 28 rebounds against Carr Creek. Both performances are still Kentucky state tournament records. Said Coleman, who had indicated his intentions to attend West Virginia (along with Jerry West) for college, bypassing Kentucky: "The crowd there was booing me for all the three games I had played. And they were still booing until I broke Johnny Cox’s record for most points in a tournament in the first quarter. Then they started rooting for me. And when Bell County was trying to freeze the ball, the crowd started booing them."

Coleman's four-game individual total of 185 points and point-per-game average of 46.25 set Kentucky state tournament records. Coleman's 27 field goals in a game, 14 field goals in one half, 69 field goals in a tournament, 47 free throws in a tournament and 28 rebounds in a game are still tournament records as well.

As a junior at Wayland High School, Coleman scored 1,174 points (32.6 average), in his sophomore year, 784 points (26.1 average), and as a 14-year–old freshman he scored 386, averaging 19.3 points. These totals were accumulated decades before the introduction of the 3-point shot.

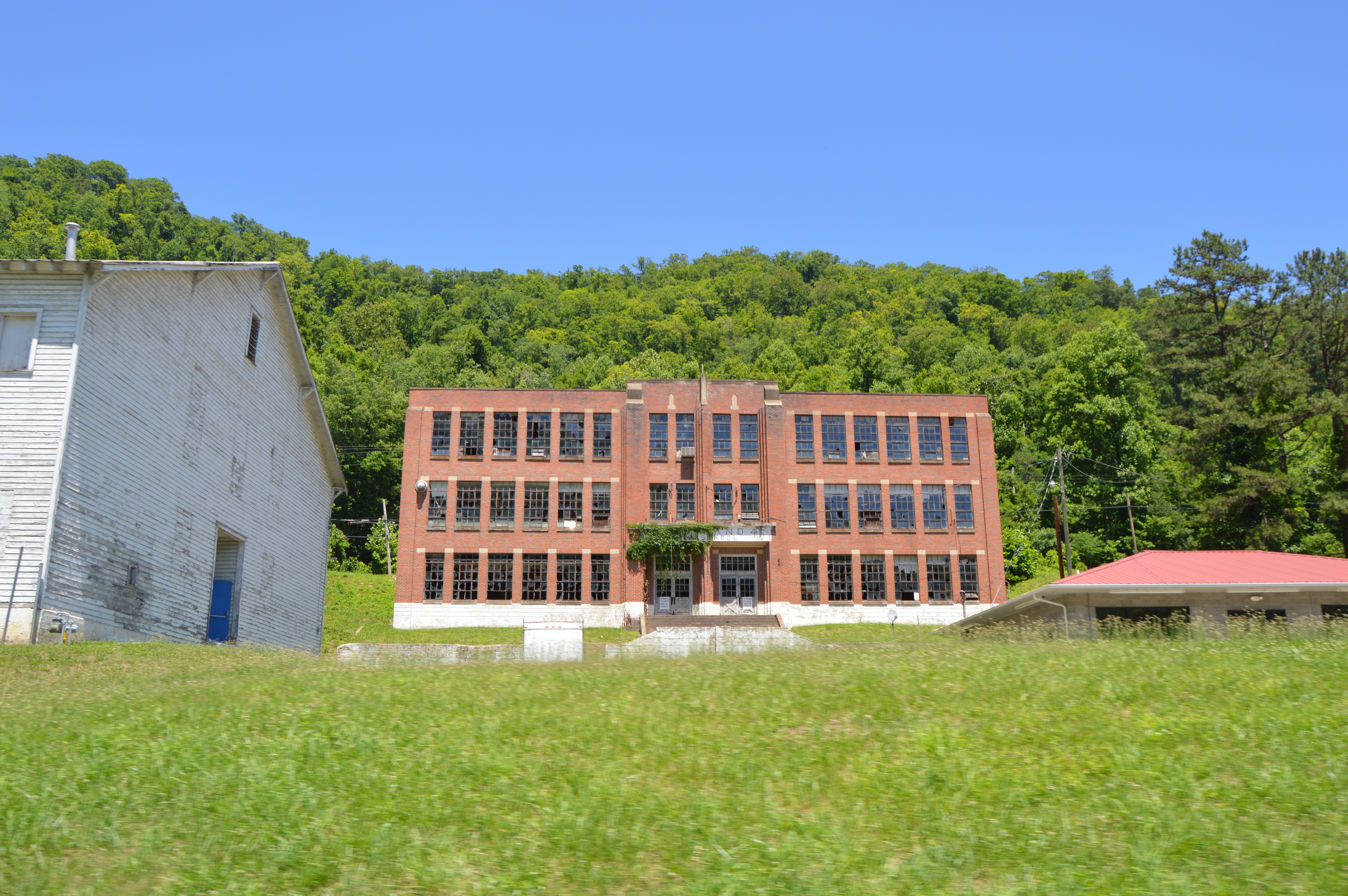
Wayland High School (2014), Gym is on the left. Coleman led Wayland to the State Final Four in 1956

== College career 1956–1960 ==
In 1955–56 as a high school senior, Coleman averaged 46.8 points per game and continued to be heavily recruited, as he had been throughout his high school career. He was being most heavily recruited by both the University of Kentucky and West Virginia University.

After a recruiting battle between the two, Coleman committed to West Virginia, along with Jerry West. However, he was eventually banned from playing for West Virginia after the NCAA determined that Coleman received major gifts, including the use of a car, clothes and money. Coleman eventually played for Kentucky Wesleyan after short stints at Eastern Kentucky University and Marshall University and a steel mill job.

After the recruiting penalties from West Virginia, Coleman enrolled and played at Kentucky Wesleyan from 1956 to 1960. At Kentucky Wesleyan, he was a two–time All-American. At the end of his collegiate career, he ranked third in career points with 2,077 and sixth in rebounding with 904. As a freshman, Coleman led the nation (University and College Divisions) with a 26.6 points per game average. Coleman still holds Kentucky Wesleyan records for highest scoring average for a career (27.7 ppg) and most points in a season (848). Coleman ranks third in career points (2,077, 27.7 ppg) and sixth in career rebounds (904, 12.1 rpg).

As a freshman, in 1956–57, Coleman led Kentucky Wesleyan to a national runner-up in the 1957 NCAA College Division basketball tournament.

As a senior in 1959–60, Coleman was third in the nation in scoring with 30.3 points per game, behind Robertson at the University of Cincinnati (33.7). He led Kentucky Wesleyan to a third-place finish in the 1960 NCAA College Division basketball tournament.

== Professional career (1960–1964) ==
On April 11, 1960, the New York Knicks selected Kelly Coleman in Round 2 with Pick 3 (#11 overall) in the 1960 NBA draft. Naismith Basketball Hall of Fame inductees Roberston (#1), West (#2) Lenny Wilkens (#7) and Satch Sanders (#9) were taken just ahead of him.

On May 23, 1960, Coleman signed a contract with the New York Knicks. On Oct 1, 1960, Knicks placed the contract of Kelly Coleman on waivers and he became a free agent. It was said that Coleman had "little to no interest in the NBA" due to the low salaries at the time.

Coleman then played for the Baltimore Bullets of the Eastern Professional Basketball League (EPBL) during the 1960–61 season and won the EPBL championship in 1961. He followed that by playing two seasons (1961–63), for the Chicago Majors of the American Basketball League, averaging 14.2 points and 7.2 rebounds in 1961–62. In 1962–63, Coleman was 5th in the league, scoring at 19.0 points and 7.6 rebounds for Chicago. He ended as the 10th all-time leading ABL scorer and 10th all-time leading rebounder in the ABL.

The American Basketball League had been founded by Abe Saperstein, who owned the Harlem Globetrotters. When the American Basketball League folded in 1963, Coleman played for the Globetrotters, who barnstormed throughout the country.

== Post basketball ==
Coleman earned a degree from Pikeville College. He became a teacher and worked for the Detroit Free Press. After retiring in Michigan, Coleman returned home to live in Wayland, Kentucky.

At a Wayland homecoming event in 2018, Coleman reflected on his career. "All I did was play," he said. "It came natural, I guess. I started playing when I was in the eighth grade and it grew from there."

Coleman died on June 16, 2019, at the Noreen and Greg Wells Hospice Care Center in Hazard, Kentucky.

== Honors ==
- 1956 Kentucky Mr. Basketball
- Kentucky's All-Time High school Career scoring record 4,337 points
- 2× NCAA All-American
- Number 45 Retired by Kentucky Wesleyan (2005).
- Number 66 Retired by Wayland High School.
- Coleman was elected to the Kentucky High School State Athletic Association Hall of Fame in 1989, but declined the honor.
- In November, 2005, Coleman was honored at Kentucky Wesleyan during the "King Kelly Coleman Homecoming Weekend" on November 18–19, 2005.
- On April 2, 2008, Coleman was honored with a resolution on the floor of the Kentucky State Senate.
- Coleman was voted to Kentucky Wesleyan's All-Century Team in 2010.
- On May 25, 2018, an oversight was repaired when Coleman received his 1956 Kentucky Mr. Basketball award after speaking to players at a youth camp.
- A portion of highway leading out of Wayland, Kentucky is named the "Kelly Coleman Highway."
- Coleman was a charter inductee of the Kentucky Association of Basketball Coaches Hall of Fame in 2012.

== In media ==
Coleman's career is detailed in a 2005 book by author Gary P. West, entitled, "King Kelly Coleman: Kentucky's Greatest Basketball Legend". (ISBN 0-9773198-0-6).
