= Paintsville High School =

Location
- 225 Second Street; Paintsville, KY 41240

Information
- School type: Public
- Founded: 1889
- Principal: Tiffany Austin
- Teaching staff: 26.00 (FTE)
- Grades: 7–12
- Enrollment: 321 (2023–2024)
- Student to teacher ratio: 12.35
- Language: English
- Area: Eastern Kentucky
- Colors: Blue and white
- Nickname: Tigers
- Website: https://www.paintsville.kyschools.us/o/phs

Paintsville High School is a secondary-level school located in Paintsville, Johnson County, Kentucky and is part of the Paintsville Independent School District. Its student enrollment as of the 2023–2024 school year was 321 in grades 7 through 12. The average student to teacher ratio in classes at Paintsville High School is 14:1.

== History ==
The Paintsville Independent School system was organized in 1889 originally as the Paintsville Free Graded School. In 1892, the first building of Paintsville High School was built. It was ravaged by fire shortly thereafter, and was rebuilt.

The early curriculum at Paintsville High was formidable. Eighth grade students studied subjects including physiology, U.S. History, geography, drawing, algebra, writing and moral philosophy. The ninth through twelfth grades studied and even harder curriculum, with subjects such as English, physics, advanced algebra, chemistry, trigonometry, surveying, bookkeeping and mental philosophy.

The student population was only 185 students with four teachers in 1894.

Paintsville High School has enjoyed success in athletics throughout the years, including state championships in basketball and baseball, though it is known more for its successes in academia.

By the late 1920s, some graduates of Paintsville High School had received doctorates in disciplines including education, chemistry, medicine and physics. Military academies accepted graduates as well, some of whom attained field grade officer ranks, and one of whom made the rank of rear admiral following World War II.

== Recent test scores ==
Since 2003, Paintsville High School has exceeded the state averages in all subjects tested, for all grades tested (ninth grade is not tested) on the Kentucky Core Content Test (KCCT). Since 2003, Paintsville High School has surpassed the national averages on the Comprehensive Test of Basic Skills (CTBS) exam, in all subjects. In 2009, Paintsville was ranked as the third district in the state on the ACT exam given to all juniors.

== Student diversity ==
The percentages of student diversity of Paintsville High School are:

White, not Hispanic: 98%
Black, not Hispanic: <1%
Asian/Pacific Islander: <1%
Hispanic: <1%

== Awards ==
2009 Bronze Medal - America's Best High Schools by US News

== Notable alumni ==
- Tyler Childers (2009), musician, songwriter
- Johnnie LeMaster, longtime shortstop of the San Francisco Giants. Drafted #6 overall in 1973, the highest a player from Kentucky has ever been selected in the MLB Draft.
- John Pelphrey, 1987 Kentucky "Mr. Basketball", former men's head basketball coach for the Arkansas Razorbacks
