= Steffphon Pettigrew =

American basketball player (born 1989)

Personal information
- Born: March 21, 1989 (age 37) Elizabethtown, Kentucky, U.S.
- Listed height: 6 ft 5 in (1.96 m)
- Listed weight: 222 lb (101 kg)

Career information
- High school: Elizabethtown (Elizabethtown, Kentucky)
- College: Western Kentucky (2007–2011)
- NBA draft: 2011: undrafted
- Playing career: 2011–2020
- Position: Forward / center

Career history
- 2011–2012: Club Atletico Aguada
- 2012–2013: Abejas de Guanajuato
- 2013: Frayles de Guasave
- 2013: Marinos de Anzoátegui
- 2013–2014: Abejas de Guanajuato
- 2014: Maratonistas de Coamo
- 2015: Talk 'N Text Tropang Texters
- 2015–2016: Chorale Roanne Basket
- 2016–2017: Abejas de Guanajuato
- 2019: Indios de San Francisco de Macorís
- 2020: Club Deportivo Universidad Católica

Career highlights
- 2× All-LNBP Second Team (2013, 2014); 2× LNBP All-Star (2015, 2017); First-team All-Sun Belt (2012); Kentucky Mr. Basketball (2007)

Steffphon Pettigrew (born March 21, 1989) is an American former professional basketball player. He played college basketball for Western Kentucky University.

== High school career ==
Pettigrew attended Elizabethtown High School in Elizabethtown, Kentucky. As a senior, he averaged 33.6 points and 13.3 rebounds per game and was named as Kentucky's 2007 Mr. Basketball.

== College career ==
In 2007, he signed with Western Kentucky Hilltoppers basketball of the NCAA's Division I (NCAA) for 4 seasons (2007–08, 2008–09, 2009–10 and 2010–11) Pettigrew earned the commonwealth's highest honor, and was also named the Kentucky Player of the Year by both the Associated Press and Louisville Courier-Journal, after averaging a state-best 33.6 points per game and 13.8 rebounds per outing — which was second among all players — for Elizabethtown High School.

== Professional career ==
=== Uruguay Basketball League (2011–12) ===
On 2011, he signed with Club Atletico Aguada of the Liga Uruguaya de Basketball. Pettigrew's four-year WKU career will go down as one of the finest in Hilltopper history, as he started the final 38 games of his career en route to 136 career games played, the second-most all-time, and made 97 starts, which rank seventh all-time. In those games he scored 1,544 points, which puts him in elite company in 13th place on the WKU career scoring list.

=== Mexico Basketball League (2012–13) ===
On November 3, 2012, he signed with Abejas de Guanajuato of the Liga Nacional de Baloncesto Profesional. His simply unstoppable played against Barreteros in the Mexican League was "best ever" after he dominated both offensively and defensively and carried the Abejas to a huge road win with average record of 41 points, 15 rebounds and 5 assist

=== Northwestern Mexico and Venezuela Basketball League (2013) ===
On May 23, 2013, he signed with the Frayles de Guasave of the Circuito de Baloncesto de la Costa del Pacífico. After one game played with Guasave he was transferred to Marinos de Anzoátegui (Venezuela) however he was released by the club in April 2013. He only averaged of 3 points, 2 rebounds and 1 block.

=== Return to Mexico Basketball League (2013–14) ===
On March 15, 2014, he returned to the Mexico to be part again of the Abejas de Guanajuato of the Liga Nacional de Baloncesto Profesional for the third season and leads the abejas for another historic season. After he played for 44 games in LNBP he averaged of (21.05 PPG) (6.27 RPG) (2.20 APG) (1.09 SPG) (0.52 BPG) (FG% .544) (FT% .669).

=== Puerto Rico Basketball League (2014) ===
On April 28, 2014, he signed with Maratonistas de Coamo of the Baloncesto Superior Nacional (Puerto Rico). He averaged 14.4 points and 5.8 rebounds per game in 14 challenges.

=== Philippine Basketball Association (2015) ===
On April 12, 2015, he signed with the Talk 'N Text Tropang Texters of the Philippine Basketball Association.

=== France Basketball League (2015) ===
On June 23, 2015, he signed with the Chorale Roanne for the 2015–2016 season from the French second division LNB Pro B.

=== The Basketball Tournament ===
In 2017, Pettigrew played for the Kentucky Kings of The Basketball Tournament. The Basketball Tournament is an annual $2 million winner-take-all tournament broadcast on ESPN.

== Honors ==
- 2011 Sun Belt "CollegeInsider.com Player of the Year"
- 2012 LUB "Quinteto Ideal" & "LatinBasket.com Uruguay All-Imports"
- 2008 Urubasket.com "Equipo Ideal"
- 2013 Mexican LNBP "2ndo Equipo Ideal" (2nd Team All League)
- 2013 Mexican LNBP record holder for single game evaluation (52)
- 2014 Mexican LNBP "2ndo Equipo Ideal" (2nd Team All League)
- 2015 All Star Nomination
