= Paintsville Independent School District =

School district in Kentucky, United States

Location
- Paintsville, KY United States

District information
- Type: Public
- Motto: We believe. They achieve!
- Grades: Pre-K through 12
- Established: 1889
- Superintendent: David Gibson

Students and staff
- Students: 781 (2008)
- Teachers: 71 (2008)
- Student–teacher ratio: 13.7 (2008)

Other information
- Website: sites.google.com/paintsville.kyschools.us/paintsville/home

The Paintsville Independent School District is a public school district based in Paintsville, Kentucky. The district serves the city of Paintsville. Its superintendent is David Gibson.

== Administration ==
=== Board of education ===
The board regularly meets on the second Monday of each month. The meetings are open to the public.

=== Members ===
- David Gibson, Superintendent
- Michael Short
- Joseph Porter
- Kay Hall
- Marvin Walker

== Schools ==
- Paintsville Elementary School
- Paintsville High School
