= Allen County Schools =

School district in Kentucky, United States

Address
- 570 Oliver Street Scottsville, Allen, Kentucky, 42164; United States

District information
- Grades: Pre-school - 12
- Superintendent: Travis Hamby
- NCES District ID: 2100070

Students and staff
- Enrollment: 3,008
- Student–teacher ratio: 16.78

Other information
- Website: www.allen.kyschools.us

Allen County Schools is a public school district in Allen County, based in Scottsville, Kentucky.

== Schools ==
The Allen County Schools School District has one elementary school, one intermediate school, one middle school, and one high school.

=== Elementary school ===
- Allen County Primary Center

=== Intermediate school ===
- Allen County Intermediate Center

=== Middle school ===
- James E Bazzell Middle School

=== High school ===
- Allen County Scottsville High School
