= E. A. Diddle Arena =

Sports venue in Bowling Green, Kentucky

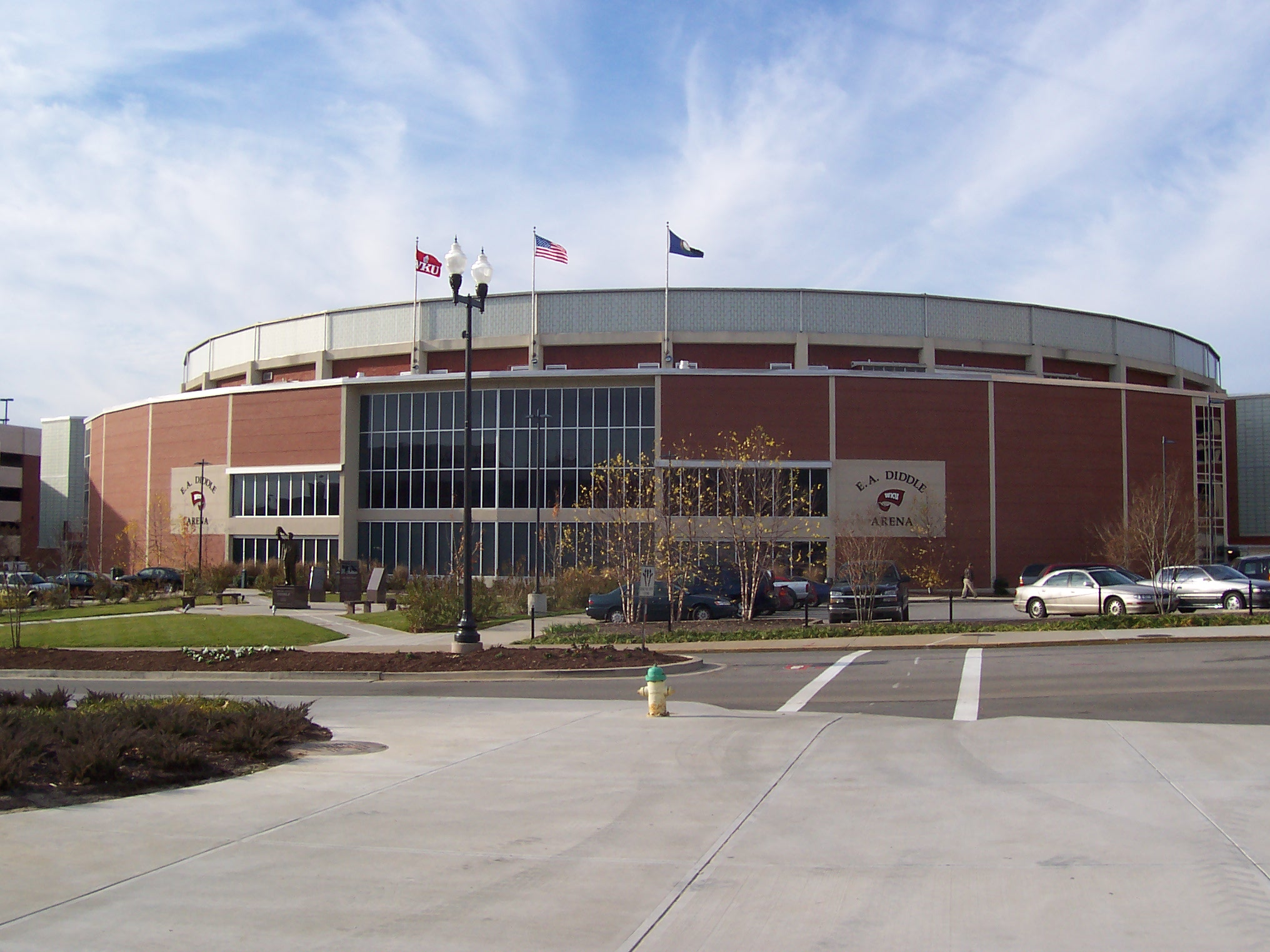
- E.A. Diddle Arena
- Interactive map of E. A. Diddle Arena
- Location: 1526 Avenue of Champions; Bowling Green, KY 42101 USA
- Coordinates: 36°59′9″N 86°27′27″W
- Owner: Western Kentucky University
- Operator: Western Kentucky University
- Capacity: 7,326 (2005–present); 7,368 (2003–2005); 7,381 (2001–2003); 11,300 (1991–2001); 12,370 (1980–1991); 13,164 (1979–1980); 13,508 (1970–1979); 12,500 (1965–1970); 8,500 (1963–1965)
- Surface: Hardwood

Construction
- Groundbreaking: November 15, 1961
- Opened: December 7, 1963
- Renovated: 2002
- Expanded: 1965, 1970
- Cost: $3,089,538 ($32.5 million in 2025 dollars)
- Architects: Frank Cain; R. Ben Johnson

Tenant
- Western Kentucky Hilltoppers (NCAA) (1963–present)

E. A. Diddle Arena is a 7,326-seat multi-purpose arena in Bowling Green, Kentucky, United States. The arena, built in 1963, is home to the Western Kentucky University Hilltoppers men's basketball team and Lady Toppers basketball and volleyball teams. It is also known as Academic-Athletic Building #1. It also holds Military Science and Physical Education & Recreation classes and offices.

== History ==
Diddle Arena was built in 1963 and is named after legendary WKU men's coach and Basketball Hall of Famer Edgar "E.A." Diddle. It hosted the Ohio Valley Conference men's basketball tournament in 1976, 1978 and 1980–1982 and has hosted the Sun Belt Conference men's basketball tournament four times. Dedicated on December 7, 1963, Diddle Arena has hosted some of the finest players and teams ever to play in the college ranks. Originally designed to seat 8,500 fans, the seating capacity has fluctuated over the years and by 1970 the arena had been adjusted to hold 13,508.

The utility and versatility of the arena throughout the years has included the facility being the site of NCAA Regional Tournaments in both men's (1980) and women's basketball, the Kentucky High School Athletic Association's Girls' Sweet Sixteen basketball tournament from 2001 to 2015, and an NBA exhibition game. (The KHSAA tournament moved to BB&T Arena at Northern Kentucky University in 2016.) The facility has also hosted several Sun Belt Conference basketball tournaments, and was the site of the 2003 and 2009 SBC Volleyball Championship. Diddle Arena has staged numerous concerts, hosted WKU's annual spring and winter commencements, and has even welcomed the President of the United States during a 1988 visit by Ronald Reagan. The arena has hosted professional basketball, including Hall of Famers Dan Issel and Artis Gilmore, as the Kentucky Colonels played two games there before the 1976 ABA–NBA merger. 10,453 fans saw the Carolina Cougars defeat the Kentucky Colonels, 94–82, on November 26, 1973 and 7,611 saw the Colonels defeat the San Diego Conquistadors, 109–100, on November 30, 1974.

In addition to being one of the homes for WKU athletics, Diddle Arena also contains classrooms and activity areas for the Department of Physical Education and Recreation as well as the WKU Army ROTC program.

Some of the record crowds that the arena has hosted include 14,277 fans for a 1971 battle against former OVC arch-rival Murray State; 13,000 for the 1984 Wendy's Classic Final versus Louisiana Tech and All-American and future Hall of Famer Karl Malone; and 13,300 for a 1986 showdown with former Sun Belt Conference rival UAB.

== Today ==
In 2002, a $32 million renovation was completed which reduced seating capacity to 7,381. The renovation also included: 16 luxury suites, all-new seating, two video boards, new concession and restroom areas, new playing floor, elevator access to all levels, new sound and lighting systems, two new auxiliary gyms totalling 30,000 square feet (2,800 m^{2}), new training and weight rooms, air-conditioning, and new locker and office space complex facilities. The renovation has been the focal point of WKU's extensive athletic complex makeover which has also included numerous enhancements to baseball's Nick Denes Field, the construction of the softball and soccer complex on Creason Drive and the expansion to football's Houchens Industries-L.T. Smith Stadium.

== See also ==
- List of NCAA Division I basketball arenas
