= A. J. Slaughter =

American-Polish basketball player

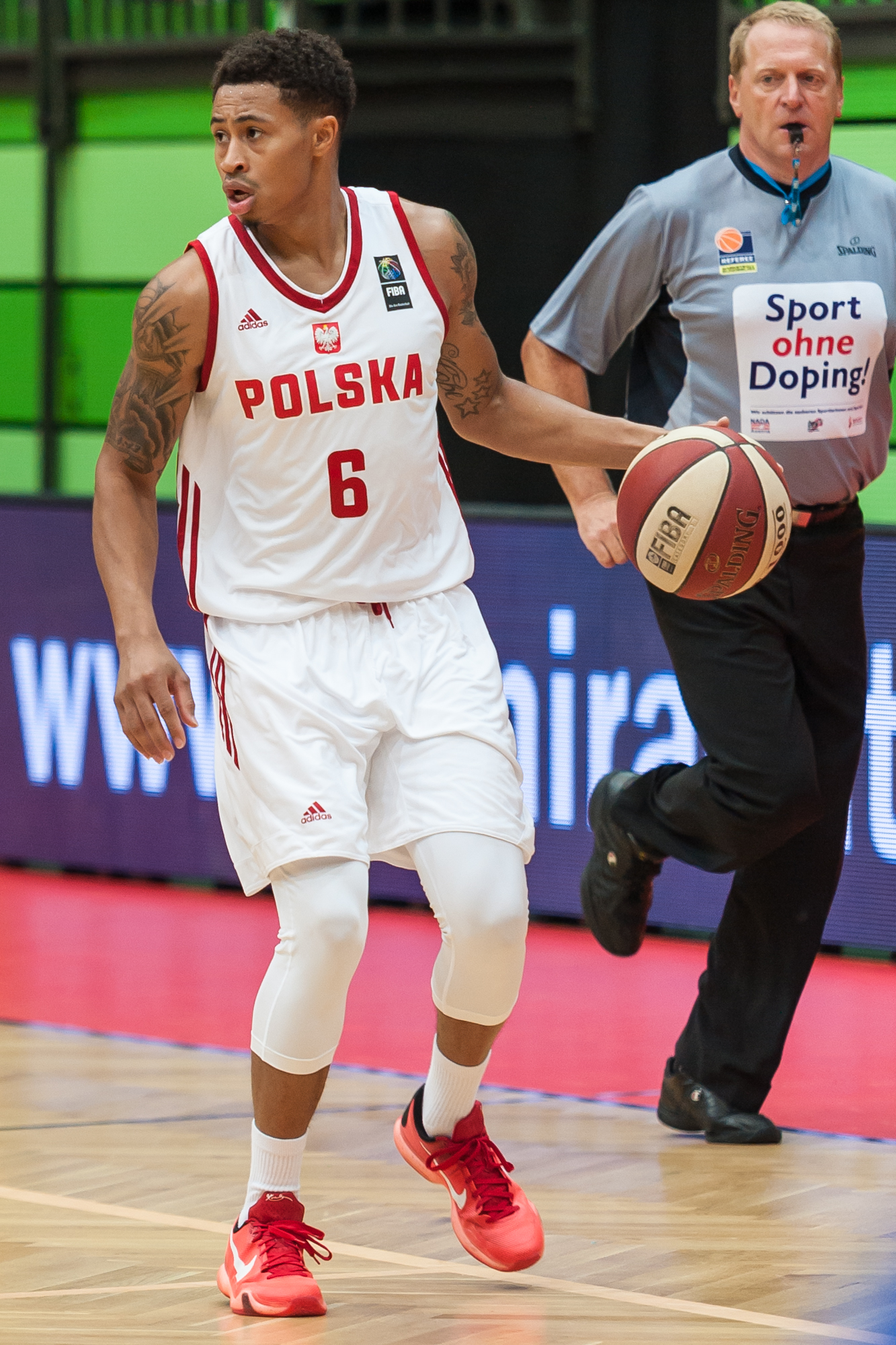
- Slaughter with Poland in 2016

Personal information
- Born: August 3, 1987 (age 39) Louisville, Kentucky, U.S.
- Listed height: 6 ft 3 in (1.91 m)
- Listed weight: 176 lb (80 kg)

Career information
- High school: Shelby County (Shelbyville, Kentucky)
- College: Western Kentucky (2006–2010)
- NBA draft: 2010: undrafted
- Playing career: 2010–present
- Position: Shooting guard

Career history
- 2010–2011: Angelico Biella
- 2011–2012: Dexia Mons-Hainaut
- 2012–2013: Cholet
- 2013–2014: Élan Chalon
- 2014–2015: Panathinaikos
- 2015–2016: Banvit
- 2016–2017: SIG Strasbourg
- 2017–2019: ASVEL
- 2019–2020: Real Betis
- 2020–2024: Gran Canaria
- 2021: Kuwait SC
- 2023: Guaros de Lara
- 2024: Gigantes de Carolina
- 2024–2025: Casademont Zaragoza
- 2025–2026: Anwil Włocławek
- 2026: Astros de Jalisco

Career highlights
- EuroCup champion (2023); Pro A champion (2019); French Cup winner (2019); Greek Cup winner (2015); French League All-Star (2014); First-team All-Sun Belt (2010); Second-team All-Sun Belt (2009)

Anthony Darrell "A. J." Slaughter (born August 3, 1987) is an American-born naturalized Polish professional basketball player for Anwil Włocławek of the Polish Basketball League (PLK). He played college basketball for Western Kentucky.

== High school ==
Slaughter started every game of his high school career at Shelby County, averaging 14.5 points, 3.3 rebounds, 3.3 assists and 2.7 steals per game. He posted 14 points, 4 rebounds and 2 steals per game during his sophomore year as the Rockets won the district championship, earning District MVP honors and a First-Team All-Region selection as well. Another district title followed in his junior year (18 points, 5 rebounds, 5 assists and 3 steals per game) with a second First-Team All-Region selection. He contributed 19.7 points, 4.3 rebounds, 3.9 assists and 3.7 steals per game as a senior to help Shelby County reach the state Sweet 16, leading the Louisville Courier-Journal to name him as their Player of the Year, with a third First-Team All-State selection added.

Rated a three-star recruit by Scout.com, Slaughter received scholarship offers from Vanderbilt and West Virginia but chose Western Kentucky (WKU) of the Sun Belt Conference in the NCAA Division I. Signing his letter of intent on 26 August 2005, he was the first verbal commitment of the 2006 Western Kentucky recruiting class.

College recruiting
| Name | Hometown | School | Height | Weight | Commit date |
|---|---|---|---|---|---|
| A.J. Slaughter; SG | Shelbyville, Kentucky | Shelby County High School (KY) | 6 ft 2 in (1.88 m) | 170 lb (77 kg) | Aug 26, 2005 |
| A.J. Slaughter; SG | Recruit ratings: Scout: | | | | |
Overall recruit ranking: Scout: 83 (SG)
Note: In many cases, Scout, Rivals, 247Sports, On3, and ESPN may conflict in their listings of height and weight.; In these cases, the average was taken. ESPN grades are on a 100-point scale.; Sources: "Western Kentucky Basketball Commitments". Rivals.; "2006 Western Kentucky Basketball Commits". Scout.; "ESPN". ESPN.; "Scout.com Team Recruiting Rankings". Scout.; "2006 Team Ranking". Rivals.

== College ==
=== Freshman year ===
For Slaughter's collegiate debut, he registered 20 minutes and scored a year-high 18 points in a 96–55 defeat of Kennesaw State on 11 November 2006, ending his season with 5 points in the 2007 Sun Belt men's basketball tournament semifinal defeat against Arkansas State. He appeared in all 33 games played, starting an 11 January 2007 game against Florida International University after starter Courtney Lee got injured, playing two more games that season. He finished with 15.9 minutes per game, contributing 200 points (10th best for WKU freshmen) with per game averages of 6.1 points (7th in the team), 1.7 rebounds, 0.9 assists and 0.9 steals (3rd in team).

=== Sophomore year ===
Slaughter scored in excess of 10 points on 12 occasions as a sophomore, including a season-high 17 points in a 31 January 2008 game against Arkansas-Little Rock. He helped Western Kentucky win the 2008 Sun Belt men's basketball tournament, earning a place in the 2008 NCAA Men's Division I Basketball Tournament. In the first-round game against Drake on 21 March 2008, Slaughter posted 10 points, 4 rebounds and 4 assists to help the team progress. In the Sweet Sixteen loss to top-seeded UCLA on March 27, he added 7 points, 3 assists and 2 steals.

== Professional career ==
After going undrafted in the 2010 NBA draft, Slaughter played for the Detroit Pistons in the NBA Summer League.

On July 26, 2010, he signed a one-year deal with Angelico Biella of the Italian Lega Basket Serie A.

For the 2011–12 season he moved to Belgium and signed with Dexia Mons-Hainaut.

In July 2012, he signed with Cholet Basket of the French LNB Pro A.

In June 2013, he signed a one-year deal with another Pro A side, Élan Chalon.

On July 16, 2014, he signed a two-year deal with Greek giants Panathinaikos. On June 30, 2015, he officially terminated his contract with the team.

On July 16, 2015, Slaughter signed with the Turkish club Banvit.

On August 15, 2016, Slaughter signed with French club SIG Strasbourg for the 2016–17 season.

On July 8, 2017, Slaughter signed a two-year contract with French club ASVEL.

On July 1, 2019, Slaughter signed a two-year deal with Spanish club Real Betis Energía Plus. He averaged 13.3 points per game.

On July 12, 2020, he signed with Herbalife Gran Canaria. On July 28, 2020, it was understood that due to a small health issue, AJ Slaughter cannot join the team until the end of September, so both parties decided to terminate their contract by mutual agreement. However, on November 10 he signed with Gran Canaria.

In May 2021, Slaughter signed with Kuwait SC to play in the Gulf Champions Basketball Championship.

In June 2023, Slaughter joined Guaros de Lara of the Superliga Profesional de Baloncesto (SPB).

On June 18, 2024, Slaughter signed with Casademont Zaragoza of the Liga ACB.

In July 2024, Slaughter joined Gigantes de Carolina of the Baloncesto Superior Nacional (BSN) for 2024 season.

On July 23, 2025, he signed with Anwil Włocławek of the Polish Basketball League (PLK).

== International career ==
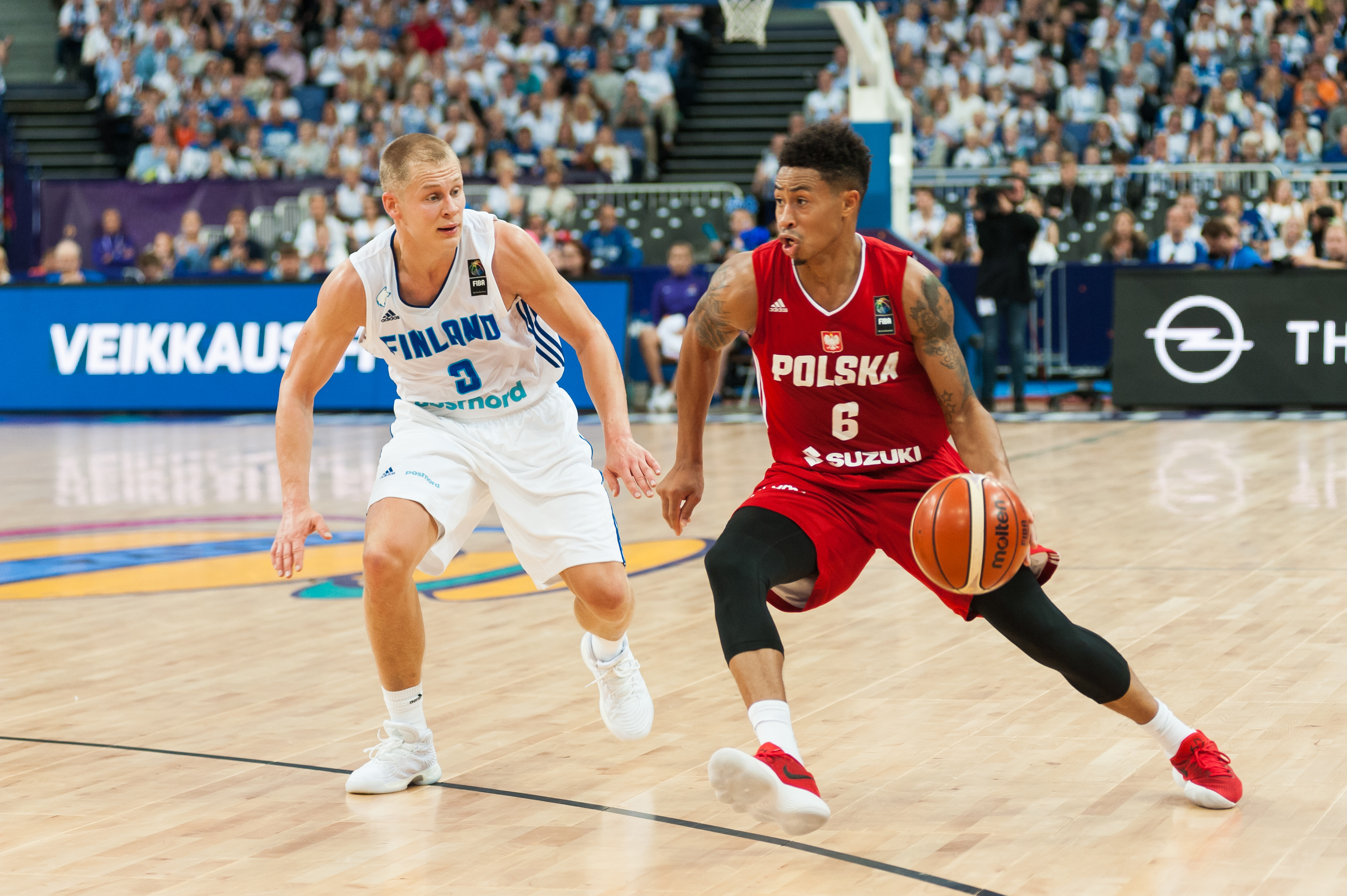
Slaughter (right) during EuroBasket 2017

In June 2015, Slaughter became a Polish citizen, in order for him to be able to play for the Poland national basketball team at EuroBasket 2015. Slaughter also played for the team during EuroBasket 2017 and EuroBasket 2022, as well as the FIBA World Cup 2019 in China.

== Personal ==
His father, Anthony "Tony" Slaughter, played basketball for Murray State from 1980 to 1981. His two sisters Toni and Antonita also played basketball collegiately, both for Louisville; the latter was a graduate assistant at Drury University as of 2015.
