= Hazard High School =

Location
- 157 Bulldog Lane; Hazard, Kentucky 41701; United States
- 37.24070187656844°N 83.1872310949907°W

Information
- Type: Public
- School district: Hazard Independent Schools
- Superintendent: Sondra Combs
- Principal: Donald Mobelini
- Teaching staff: 23.16 (on FTE basis)
- Grades: 9-12
- Student to teacher ratio: 13.00
- Colours: Navy and old gold
- Athletics conference: KHSAA
- Team name: Bulldogs
- Feeder schools: Hazard Middle School
- Website: Official website

Hazard High School is a public high school in Hazard, Kentucky. The school serves about 300 students in grades 9–12 in the Hazard Independent Schools.

== History ==
Hazard High School's boys' basketball team, the Bulldogs, won state titles in 1932 and 1955, and won the Kentucky All A title in 2004. Alumni Johnny Cox and Sam Smith played in the NBA and ABA, respectively. Hazard High School's girls' basketball team, the Lady Bulldogs, also won both the All A and Sweet 16 Kentucky state championships in 1997.

The Hazard High School "Band of Gold" was one of ten marching bands chosen to play at George H. W. Bush's presidential inauguration in 1989. It first entered the competitive marching scene in 1987. From 1993 to 1997, the Hazard Band of Gold also competed in the prestigious Bands of America (BOA) national-level marching band contests, placing 3rd in the nation in their class on more than one occasion at the BOA Grand National Championships held in Indianapolis, Indiana, as well as placing 1st in the Class A division at the 1994 Eastern Regionals BOA competition in Morgantown, West Virginia.

The school received attention in 2021 after viral photos of students having a "Man Pageant" for the schools homecoming in which students of the school were shown dressing in women's undergarments and lap-dancing on staff members. Following the controversy, Hazard students rallied in support of principal and mayor of Hazard Happy Mobelini.

== Notable alumni ==
- Johnny Cox (born 1936), NBA basketball player
- Daniel Mongiardo (born 1960), Lieutenant Governor of Kentucky
- Tanner Morgan (born 1999), former quarterback at the University of Minnesota (transferred to Ryle High School in Boone County, Kentucky)
- Jon Olinger (born 1980), football player
- Jim Rose (1949–2009), basketball player.
- Sam Smith (born 1944), ABA basketball player
