= Shelby County High School (Kentucky) =

Location
- 1701 Frankfort Road (US 60); Shelbyville, Kentucky 40065; 38.21015°N 85.179°W

Information
- Type: Public
- Motto: Learning for life - Success for all
- Established: 1960
- School district: Shelby County Public Schools
- Principal: Carlisha Kent
- Staff: 50.27 (FTE)
- Grades: 8–12
- Student to teacher ratio: 19.85
- Campus: Exurban
- Colors: Navy, white and Vegas gold
- Nickname: Rockets
- Rivals: Martha Layne Collins High School; Oldham County High School; Spencer County High School; Anderson County High School; Henry County High School; Woodford County High School
- Feeder schools: Shelby County East Middle School
- Website: www.shelby.kyschools.us/o/schs

Shelby County High School is a public high school in Shelbyville, Shelby County, Kentucky, United States. The school was established in 1960 and later absorbed Shelbyville High School, remaining the only high school in the district until the opening of Martha Layne Collins High School in 2010 to meet overcrowding concerns. The split of the school cut the school's population roughly in half.

== About ==
Shelby County High School is located in Shelbyville, KY, approximately 30 miles east of Kentucky's largest city, Louisville. Primarily a rural community, Shelbyville has also experienced progressive industrial growth in the past 10–15 years. 1200 +/- students attend Shelby County High School, grades 8–12.

Shelby County High School is accredited through Southern Association of Colleges and Schools. The average ACT composite score is 21.5 and SAT average is 1100. SCHS offers courses to guide students along the right paths to college and careers.

Classes at the Advanced Placement and Honors level are offered in all core areas plus art and agriculture. Qualified seniors may earn up to six college hours through Jefferson Community and Technical College courses taught next door at JCTC. There are also classes in horticulture/agriculture, business, family and consumer science and technology, as well as opportunities through the Marine Corps Junior ROTC unit. Classes work on a block schedule format where students attend five 73 minute classes per day per semester.

There are a number of school-based enterprises to give students hands-on knowledge of marketing products as well as co-op assignments with local businesses throughout the year. Additional vocational programs such as pre-nursing are available at the Shelby Area Technical School located directly behind SCHS.

The students also have the option to take foreign language, band, orchestra, chorus, drama, dance, art, and television production. Students can also participate in the Student Technology Leadership Program. A state-of-the-art media center/library and computer lab along with a Kentucky Technology Learning Network system provides assistance for students, in addition to Extended School Services (tutoring, independent study, winter/summer school sessions).

Students are required to have 27 credits to graduate. Nineteen sanctioned sports and a host of extracurricular activities add to the positive atmosphere at SCHS. A School Resource Officer and other conflict-resolution programs promote a safe learning environment.

== Sports ==
Shelby County is a member of the KHSAA (Kentucky High School Athletic Association) and participates in many sports such as baseball, boys' and girls' basketball, boys' and girls' cross country, football, boys' and girls' golf, boys' and girls' soccer, fast pitch softball, swimming, boys' and girls' tennis, boys' and girls' track, volleyball, and cheerleading. They are nicknamed the Rockets (for boys' sports) and Lady Rockets (for girls' sports). The school colors are Navy Blue, Vegas Gold, and White.

=== Baseball ===
- State Runner-up: 1966, 1991, 2007, 2023
- State Championships: 1979

=== Boys' basketball ===
- District Championships (since 1997–98 season): 1998, 1999, 2000, 2001, 2002, 2004, 2005, 2006, 2008, 2010, 2014
- Regional Championships: 1948, 1951, 1952, 1953, 1955, 1956, 1958, 1961, 1965, 1966, 1967, 1968, 1969, 1970, 1975, 1976, 1977, 1978, 1981, 1982, 1990, 1993, 1994, 2006, 2008, 2010
- State Championships: 1966, 1978

=== Girls' basketball ===
- State Runner-up: 2000

=== Football ===
- State Championships: 1987
- State Runners-up: 1963, 1976, 1977, 1993

=== Golf ===
- State Championship: Madison Thomas 2014

== Notable alumni ==
- Mike Casey, Class of 1966- Kentucky Mr. Basketball, played basketball at the University of Kentucky, drafted In 8th round of the 1970 NBA draft by the Chicago Bulls, Kentucky Wildcats Athletic Hall of Fame inductee in 2009.
- Lee Tinsley, Class of 1987 - Former Major League Baseball outfielder and former assistant hitting coach of the Cincinnati Reds
- A. J. Slaughter, Class of 2006 - Played basketball at Western Kentucky University and currently plays for the Polish Club KK Włocławek. He also spent time in the NBA Summer League with the Orlando Magic and Detroit Pistons.
