= Jeff Lamp =

American basketball player (born 1959)

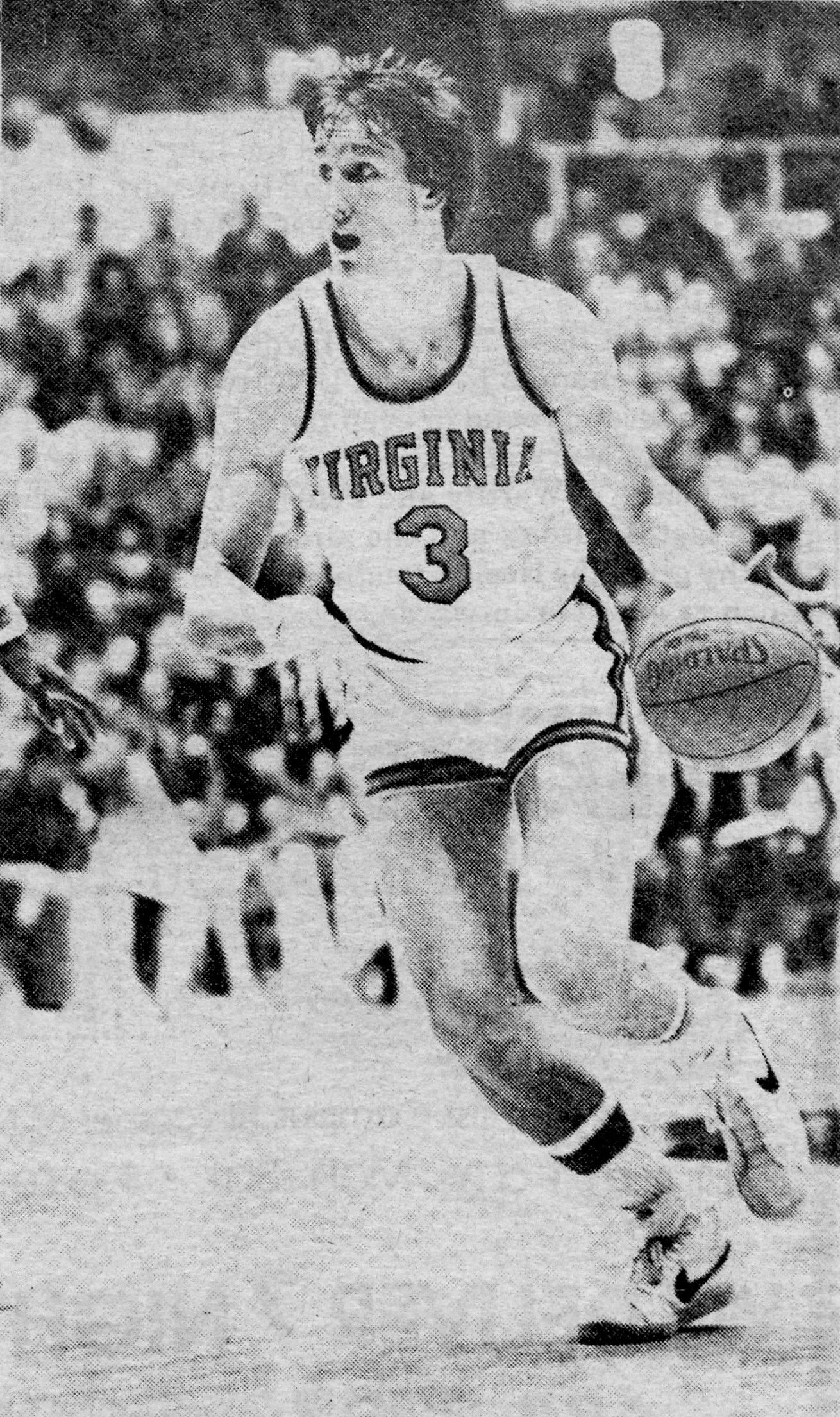
- Lamp playing for Virginia in 1981

Personal information
- Born: March 9, 1959 (age 67) Minneapolis, Minnesota, U.S.
- Listed height: 6 ft 6 in (1.98 m)
- Listed weight: 195 lb (88 kg)

Career information
- High school: Ballard (Louisville, Kentucky)
- College: Virginia (1977–1981)
- NBA draft: 1981: 1st round, 15th overall pick
- Drafted by: Portland Trail Blazers
- Playing career: 1981–1993
- Position: Small forward / shooting guard
- Number: 3

Career history
- 1981–1984: Portland Trail Blazers
- 1985–1986: Milwaukee Bucks
- 1986: San Antonio Spurs
- 1986–1987: Hamby Rimini
- 1987–1989: Los Angeles Lakers
- 1989–1991: Reyer Venezia
- 1991–1992: Oximesa Granada
- 1992–1993: Manresa

Career highlights
- NBA champion (1988); Spanish League Top Scorer (1992); Consensus second-team All-American (1981); Third-team All-American – UPI (1980); 2× First-team All-ACC (1979, 1981); 2× Second-team All-ACC (1978, 1980); No. 3 retired by Virginia Cavaliers; First-team Parade All-American (1977); McDonald's All-American (1977); Kentucky Mr. Basketball (1977)
- Stats at NBA.com
- Stats at Basketball Reference

Jeffrey Alan Lamp (born March 9, 1959) is an American former professional basketball player who played six seasons in the National Basketball Association (NBA). Lamp played college basketball for the University of Virginia, where he was an All-American. At a height of 6'6", he played shooting guard and small forward.

== High school career ==
Lamp attended and played competitively at Ballard High School, in Louisville, Kentucky. He was named to the inaugural McDonald's All-American team, which played in the 1977 Capital Classic.

== College career ==
Lamp played from 1977 to 1981 for the Virginia Cavaliers. Lamp was an All-ACC selection in each of his four seasons at UVa (1977–81). He finished with 2,317 career points which was a school record until broken by Bryant Stith (2,516) in 1992. During his time in Charlottesville, Lamp was part of the 1980–81 team that claimed an Atlantic Coast Conference (ACC) regular season title and made the school's first Final Four appearance.

== Professional career ==
Lamp was selected by the Portland Trail Blazers, in the first round (15th pick overall) of the 1981 NBA draft. Lamp played in six NBA seasons, for four different teams (the Blazers, Milwaukee Bucks, San Antonio Spurs, and Los Angeles Lakers).

In his NBA career, Lamp played in 291 games, and he scored a total of 1,495 points. His best year in the NBA came during the 1985–86 season, when he split time with the Bucks and Spurs, appearing in 74 games, and averaging 8.2 points per game. Lamp won two NBA championships (1987 and 1988 with the Lakers) and participated in three NBA Finals (1987, 1988 and 1989, the latter also with the Lakers)

Lamp currently lives in Los Angeles, and works for the NBPA.

== NBA career statistics ==
Legend
GP	Games played	GS	Games started	MPG	Minutes per game
FG%	Field goal percentage	3P%	3-point field goal percentage	FT%	Free throw percentage
RPG	Rebounds per game	APG	Assists per game	SPG	Steals per game
BPG	Blocks per game	PPG	Points per game	**Bold**	Career high
†	Won an NBA championship

=== Regular season ===
Year	Team	GP	GS	MPG	FG%	3P%	FT%	RPG	APG	SPG	BPG	PPG
1981–82	Portland	54	0	11.4	**.510**	.000	.820	1.2	0.5	0.3	0.0	4.6
1982–83	Portland	59	**1**	11.7	.425	.167	.808	1.3	1.0	0.3	**0.1**	4.4
1983–84	Portland	**64**	0	10.3	.490	.154	.896	1.0	0.8	0.3	**0.1**	5.0
1985–86	Milwaukee	44	**1**	15.9	.449	.231	.859	**2.8**	1.5	0.5	**0.1**	6.3
1985–86	San Antonio	30	**1**	**20.7**	.502	.235	.812	2.6	**1.8**	**0.6**	0.0	**11.1**
1987–88†	Los Angeles	3	0	2.3	.000	.000	**1.000**	0.0	0.0	0.0	0.0	0.7
1988–89	Los Angeles	37	0	4.8	.391	**.500**	.800	0.9	0.4	0.2	**0.1**	1.6
Career		291	3	11.9	.470	.222	.841	1.5	0.9	0.4	0.0	5.1

=== Playoffs ===
Year	Team	GP	GS	MPG	FG%	3P%	FT%	RPG	APG	SPG	BPG	PPG
1983	Portland	1	–	1.0	**.500**	.000	.000	0.0	0.0	0.0	0.0	2.0
1984	Portland	3	–	6.3	.333	.000	.000	0.0	0.0	0.0	0.0	1.3
1986	San Antonio	3	0	**15.0**	.389	**.333**	.000	0.3	**2.3**	**0.3**	0.0	**5.0**
1989	Los Angeles	**5**	0	2.8	**.500**	.000	**.500**	**0.6**	0.2	0.0	0.0	1.4
Career		12	0	6.6	.406	.333	.500	0.3	0.7	0.1	0.0	2.3
