= Ballard High School (Louisville, Kentucky) =

Public high school in Louisville, Kentucky

Coordinates: 38.28370°N 85.62440°W

Location
- 6000 Brownsboro Road; Louisville, Kentucky 40222; United States

Information
- Type: Public Secondary
- Motto: Home of Champions
- Established: 1968
- School district: Jefferson County Public Schools
- Principal: Jason Neuss
- Teaching staff: 107.93 (on an FTE basis)
- Grades: 9–12
- Enrollment: 2,033 (2023–2024)
- Student to teacher ratio: 18.84
- Campus: Suburban
- Colors: Maroon and white
- Mascot: Bruins
- Campus size: 30 acres (120,000 m^{2})
- Website: schools.jefferson.kyschools.us/high/ballard/

Ballard High School is a high school in the eastern suburbs of Louisville, Kentucky, and is a part of the Jefferson County Public Schools (JCPS) school district. The school opened in the fall of 1968. The first students were in grades 7-9, and a grade was added each year as the building was expanded. This kept the school system from having to transfer upper class students from other high schools. The first class (consisting of the original freshmen) graduated in 1972. From its founding until the mid-1980s the principal was Patrick Crawford. Sandy Allen served from the mid-1980s to the 2003–2004 school year. The principal from 2004 through 2013 was Jim Jury. Staci Edelman was the 4th and shortest standing principal, from 2015 to 2017, with a term marked by racial tension and controversy. The current principal is Jason Neuss. The school offers grades 9-12.

Ballard participates in the Jefferson County Public Schools Advanced Program, a program designed to provide accelerated instruction for academically gifted and talented students. The school also offers over 20 advanced placement courses.

Approximately 20 percent of Ballard graduates transition to college.

== Campus ==
The campus at Ballard High School consists of the main school building as well as the fine arts building. The main building is referred to by students and faculty as four separate buildings (North, South, East, and West), although all four sections are connected to each other by overhead walkways. The South and North buildings house the majority of the classrooms at Ballard High School as well as the North and South offices. The West building's first floor is the home of Ballard's famed art department and the 2nd floor houses the Library. The East building's 1st floor contains the three cafeterias, the Ballard Bank, and the Ballard Student Guidance Center (College Counselor.) The East building second floor is the home of Ballard's award-winning Music department as well as both the large and small gymnasiums.

The Sandy Allen Fine Arts Center is a performing arts facility on the Ballard High School campus. The 22,500 sq ft (2,090 m^{2}). facility, which opened in 1998, seats 900. The fine arts center is used for musical and theatrical productions put on by the school's fine arts department. In 1999, it was awarded the AIA KY Merit Award of Excellence for its design.

In Kentucky, care must be taken not to confuse this school with Ballard Memorial High School, the public high school that serves Ballard County in the far-western Jackson Purchase.

== Demographics ==
The following table represents the breakdown of students by race/ethnicity from the 2013–14 and 2022–21 school years.

	Number of Students		Percent	
Student race/ethnicity	2013–2014	2020–2021	2013–2014	2020–2021
White	1195	1,099	60%	54%
Black	613	601	30.8%	29.5%
Asian	78	105	3.9%	5.2%
Hispanic	75	130	3.8%	6.4%
American Indian/Alaskan Native	3	6	0.2%	0.3%
Other	29	94	1.5%	4.6%
All	1,993	2,035	100%	100%

== Choir, band, orchestra and speech ==
The Ballard choral program is one of the largest in the state of Kentucky and is the only fully graded-sequential program in Jefferson County. Each year a large number of students are accepted into the KMEA All-State Choirs and many go on to participate in university choral programs. The choir has received distinguished ratings at the regional KMEA Assessment every year since 1995 and has received national and international awards in the past. The choral program also has a strong club aspect with the school's Madrigal Singers, made up of choral students, being known for putting on a Madrigal Feast each year for the community.

== Notable alumni ==
- Jo Adell, first-round pick in 2017 MLB draft by Los Angeles Angels
- Dotsie Bausch, track cyclist and member of 2012 U.S. Olympic team
- Dontez Byrd, NFL football player
- Jerry Eaves, NBA basketball player for Utah Jazz
- Craig Greenberg (born 1973), businessman, lawyer, and politician; Mayor of Louisville
- Sid Griffin, musician and co-founder of The Long Ryders
- Earl Heyman, member of NFL Super Bowl champion New Orleans Saints, also CFL defensive lineman for Edmonton Eskimos
- Allan Houston, Kentucky Mr. Basketball (1989), All-SEC, All-American, and all-time leading scorer at University of Tennessee, NBA guard for Detroit Pistons and New York Knicks
- Jeremi Johnson, fullback for Cincinnati Bengals
- Shawn Kelley, Major League Baseball player for Washington Nationals, New York Yankees
- James Kim, 1989, CNET editor and victim of hypothermia
- Jeff Lamp, basketball player
- Kelan Martin, NBA basketball player for the Indiana Pacers
- DeVante Parker, first-round pick in 2015 NFL draft, wide receiver for Miami Dolphins
- Bobby Littman, elite ultra-marathon athlete, multi-stage race champion
- Bill Plaschke, sports columnist for Los Angeles Times and panelist on ESPN's Around the Horn
- Michael Saag, 1973, physician, infectious disease expert
- Jeremy Sowers, baseball player for Cleveland Indians and Manager of Major League Operations for the Tampa Bay Rays
- Wayne Kent Taylor, founder and former CEO of casual-dining chain Texas Roadhouse
- DeJuan Wheat, NBA basketball player

== See also ==
- Public schools in Louisville, Kentucky
