= Martha Layne Collins High School =

Location
- 801 Discovery Blvd. Shelbyville, KY 40065; United States
- 38°13′27″N 85°16′24″W

Information
- Type: Public
- Motto: Inspired Learning, Leading, and Living
- Established: 2010
- School district: Shelby County Public Schools
- Principal: Joshua Wayne Gibson
- Faculty: 67
- Grades: 9-12
- Enrollment: 1,156 (2020-21)
- Colors: Columbia blue and black
- Nickname: Titans
- Feeder schools: Shelby County West Middle School, Marnell C. Moorman School
- Website: www.shelby.kyschools.us/o/chs

Martha Layne Collins High School is a high school located in Shelbyville, Kentucky, United States and is a part of the Shelby County Public School District. Commonly referred to as Collins High School, the school is named after Martha Layne Collins, the first female governor of Kentucky and a Shelby County native.

== Athletics ==
=== Football ===
2021-2022 Football Head Coach Jerry Lucas 20134A State Champions

== Awards and recognition ==
In 2015, Collins High School was deemed a Distinguished High School by the Kentucky Department of Education and its Biomedical Engineering Program became nationally accredited by Project Lead the Way. In 2014, Collins High School was named the 5th Most Challenging High School in the state of Kentucky by the Washington Post. Also in 2014, the Culinary Department at Collins made the Hospitality 100 list released by Sullivan University honoring high schools across the country that excel in culinary arts.
