= Mike Casey (basketball) =

American basketball player (1948–2009)

Personal information
- Born: May 26, 1948 Simpsonville, Kentucky, U.S.
- Died: April 9, 2009 (aged 60) Nashville, Tennessee, U.S.
- Listed height: 6 ft 4 in (1.93 m)
- Listed weight: 187 lb (85 kg)

Career information
- High school: Shelby County (Shelbyville, Kentucky)
- College: Kentucky (1968–1971)
- NBA draft: 1971: 11th round, 169th overall pick
- Drafted by: Cleveland Cavaliers
- Position: Guard / forward

Career highlights
- 3× First-team All-SEC (1968–1971); 2× Second-team All-SEC (1969, 1971); Academic All-American (1971); Kentucky Mr. Basketball (1966)
- Stats at Basketball Reference

Mike Casey (May 26, 1948 – April 9, 2009) was a basketball player for the University of Kentucky Wildcats from 1967 to 1971. Casey was a part of what some consider to be the best recruiting class in UK history (a class which included 11 players, notably Dan Issel, Mike Pratt, Casey, and Terry Mills). Casey suffered a severely broken leg between his junior and senior year. Because of this, he had to redshirt what would have been his senior year, which may have cost UK a national championship in 1970. Casey was chosen in 1970 by the Chicago Bulls and later in 1971 by the Cleveland Cavaliers, but never played professionally.

== Career ==
Casey, Kentucky's 'Mr. Basketball' in 1966, finished his career averaging 18.7 points per game, in 82 games played. The 18.7 points per game he averaged for his career ranks ninth in UK history, one-tenth of a point below Jamal Mashburn. He also led the Wildcats in free throw shooting in 1968 at 82.3%, and in assists in 1969, with 4.6 per game.

Casey had the honor of being the only man to out-score Dan Issel at the collegiate level; in their sophomore year Casey averaged 20.1 points per game to Issel's 16.4. His junior year his average dipped to 19.1 points per game. After redshirting what would have been his senior year, Casey came back to average 17.0 points per game. His final year he also shot 50.4% from the field.

Former coach Adolph Rupp said:

Casey was the best money player I ever coached. When there was money on the table, you wanted Mike Casey to have the ball in his hands.

Kentucky's record during Casey's three years was 67–16, an .807 winning percentage.

Casey's Shelby County team defeated Louisville Male 72–67 for the Kentucky State Championship in 1966, which was the same night that UK lost to Texas Western in the national title game.

== After basketball ==
Casey sold industrial chemicals, then worked for Balfour, a company that makes class rings and graduation items, where he later retired.

He died at Vanderbilt University Medical Center in Nashville, TN after suffering from congestive heart failure since 1988.
