= Clay County High School (Kentucky) =

Location
- Manchester, Kentucky; United States
- Coordinates: 37°10′49″N 83°45′59″W

Information
- Type: Public high school
- School district: Clay County Public Schools
- Superintendent: William Sexton
- Principal: Mike Gregory
- Teaching staff: 50.75 (FTE)
- Grades: 9-12
- Enrollment: 756 (2023-2024)
- Student to teacher ratio: 14.90
- Color
- Team name: Tigers
- Website: www.clay.k12.ky.us/1/Home

Clay County High School is a high school in Manchester, Clay County, Kentucky, United States. It is the only high school in the county.

== Notable alumni ==
- Bert T. Combs
- Richie Farmer
