= Harlan County High School =

Location
- 4000 U.S. Highway 119; Baxter, KY 40806; United States
- 38°53′5″N 83°16′34″W

Information
- Type: Public
- Established: 2008
- School district: Harlan County Public Schools
- Superintendent: Brett Johnson
- Principal: Kathy Napier
- Teaching staff: 69.33 (FTE)
- Grades: 9 to 12
- Enrollment: 944 (2023-2024)
- Student to teacher ratio: 13.62
- Campus: Rural
- Colors: Cardinal, black and silver
- Slogan: We Are HC!
- Athletics conference: 5A
- Sports: Archery, baseball, basketball, cheerleading, cross country, dance, football, golf, marching band, softball, track and field, soccer, volleyball
- Mascot: Black Bear
- Nickname: Black Bears and Lady Bears
- Team name: Black Bears
- Feeder schools: Black Mountain, Cawood, Cumberland, Evarts, Green Hill, James A. Cawood, Rosspoint, and Wallins Elementary schools
- Website: https://www.harlan.kyschools.us/o/hchs

Harlan County High School (HCHS) is a public high school located in the unincorporated community of Rosspoint, Kentucky, served by the post office of another unincorporated community, Baxter. The school opened in August 2008 to replace the three previously separate public high schools in the Harlan County district: Evarts High School, James A. Cawood, and Cumberland High School. (A fourth public high school in the county, Harlan High School, is operated by a separate district and did not participate in the consolidation.) The school has been met with mixed criticism, with praises for its unique architecture, design and educational value.

== History ==
Main construction for Harlan County High School began in 2006 and finished in 2008. Opening orientation was held on August 24, 2008, and school was scheduled to open for students the next day. However, an arson attempt activated several sprinklers throughout the school, forcing the postponement of opening day until September. More than 1,701 students began attending the school on opening day.

The teams were provisionally to be called the Knights, however, public opinion led to the decision to name them the Black Bears in honor of the Ursus americanus bears that inhabit the area. The school is the flagship of the Harlan County Public Schools, whose superintendent is Brett Johnson.

== Architecture and design ==
Although Harlan County High School is located in a rural community, the school was built with a generous budget and has been praised for its unique architectural design. Paired with a few defining characteristics - such as the multiple bear statues and giant bear paw painted on its grassy embankment, the black of the bear paw is made from coal - more remarkable qualities distinguish the school. The school's main entrance leads students through a lobby featuring images and artifacts of historic schools and into a three-story atrium, designed as a street that connects all the main functions of the school, from which one can almost view every area in the building as well. Other important areas include the main office, gymnasium, auditorium, lunchroom, library, security office, and classrooms.

== Sports, clubs, and organizations ==
Tom Larkey served as the first head coach of the Black Bears football team, winning two regional titles and multiple district crowns as well. Larkey and the school parted ways after a 2–9 season, Eddie Creech took over for Larkey as the leader for the Bears on the sideline. The Bears went 4–7 in Creech's first two-season, qualifying for the playoffs both years, but facing first-round exits both years in close games. In 2017, the third season under Creech, the Bears had their first winning season in three years, as well as taking the school's third regional championship. The 2018 season found some success, giving the Black Bears a district title and one playoff win. Beginning in 2019, the Black Bears competed in class 4A football instead of 5A, where they had competed since their second season. In 2023, under coach Amos McCreary, the Black Bears moved back to class 5A.

Below are a list of organizations, clubs, and sports that students may participate in:

=== Athletics ===
Boys:

- Baseball
- Basketball
- Bass Fishing
- Cross Country
- Football
- Golf
- Soccer
- Track and Field

Girls:

- Basketball
- Cheerleading
- Cross Country
- Dance
- Golf
- Soccer
- Softball
- Track and Field
- Volleyball

=== Clubs and organizations ===
- Archery
- Academic Team
- Band
- Beta Club
- Choir
- Drama Club
- Breakfast Club
- FBLA
- FCCLA
- FFA
- First Priority
- Jazz Band
- JROTC (Raider, Drill Team, Rifle Team, Color Guard)
- NHS
