= Shelby Valley High School =

American public high school in the state of Kentucky

Location
- 125 Douglas Park, Pikeville, Kentucky 41501; 37.380°N 82.538°W

Information
- Type: Public
- Established: 1990-1991
- School district: Pike County Schools
- Principal: Greg Napier
- Staff: 31.00 (FTE)
- Grades: 9-12
- Enrollment: 500 (2023–2024)
- Student to teacher ratio: 16.13
- Colors: Blue and white
- Mascot: Wildcat
- Information: (606) 639-0033
- Website: svhs.pike.kyschools.us

Shelby Valley High School (SVHS) is a public high school located in Pike County, Kentucky, United States. The school campus is situated on flat land in the rugged mountains of eastern Kentucky. There are 597 students currently enrolled in grades 9–12. Located approximately ten miles south of Pikeville on US 23, the school receives students from three elementary schools and two middle schools.

In 1990, school administrators decided to merge two local schools, Dorton High School and Virgie High School, which had both been in existence for several decades, into one. Twenty million dollars was spent on the undertaking.

== History ==
Shelby Valley is the result of the consolidation of Virgie and Dorton High Schools.

The current principal is Greg Napier,

The school song was written in the first year the school opened by Class of 1991 graduate Darren Branham.

== Student activities ==
The school has excelled in sports for both girls and boys, including basketball, football, soccer, cross country, track, various academic teams, marching band and volleyball.

In 2008, the marching band made it to the KMEA State Finals, making it the second marching band from Pike County to earn this distinction.

In 1990 the varsity football team made KHSAA history as the first team ever to make the state playoffs in its first year of existence. Known as "The Crunch Bunch," the team finished with a 7–4 regular season record that stood for nearly ten years as the schools winningest season until it was finally bested in 1999 when they finished 9–2. In 2014 the football team with a 11–3 record advanced to the KHSAA 2A State Semi-finals (https://scoreboard.12dt.com/scoreboard/khsaa/kyfb14/tournament_134002) marking their highest yearly win total. They followed up the next year winning their first back-to-back District title.

In 2010, the school won the 2010 PNC Bank/KHSAA Boys' Sweet Sixteen basketball championship. It was the first school from Pike County to win the title and also the first team in the state to win the Sweet 16 and the All "A" State Title in the same year. The next season Shelby Valley returned to the Sweet Sixteen but lost in the first round to Christian County.
