= Allen County Scottsville High School =

Coordinates: 36°45′14″N 86°13′2″W

Allen County-Scottsville High School
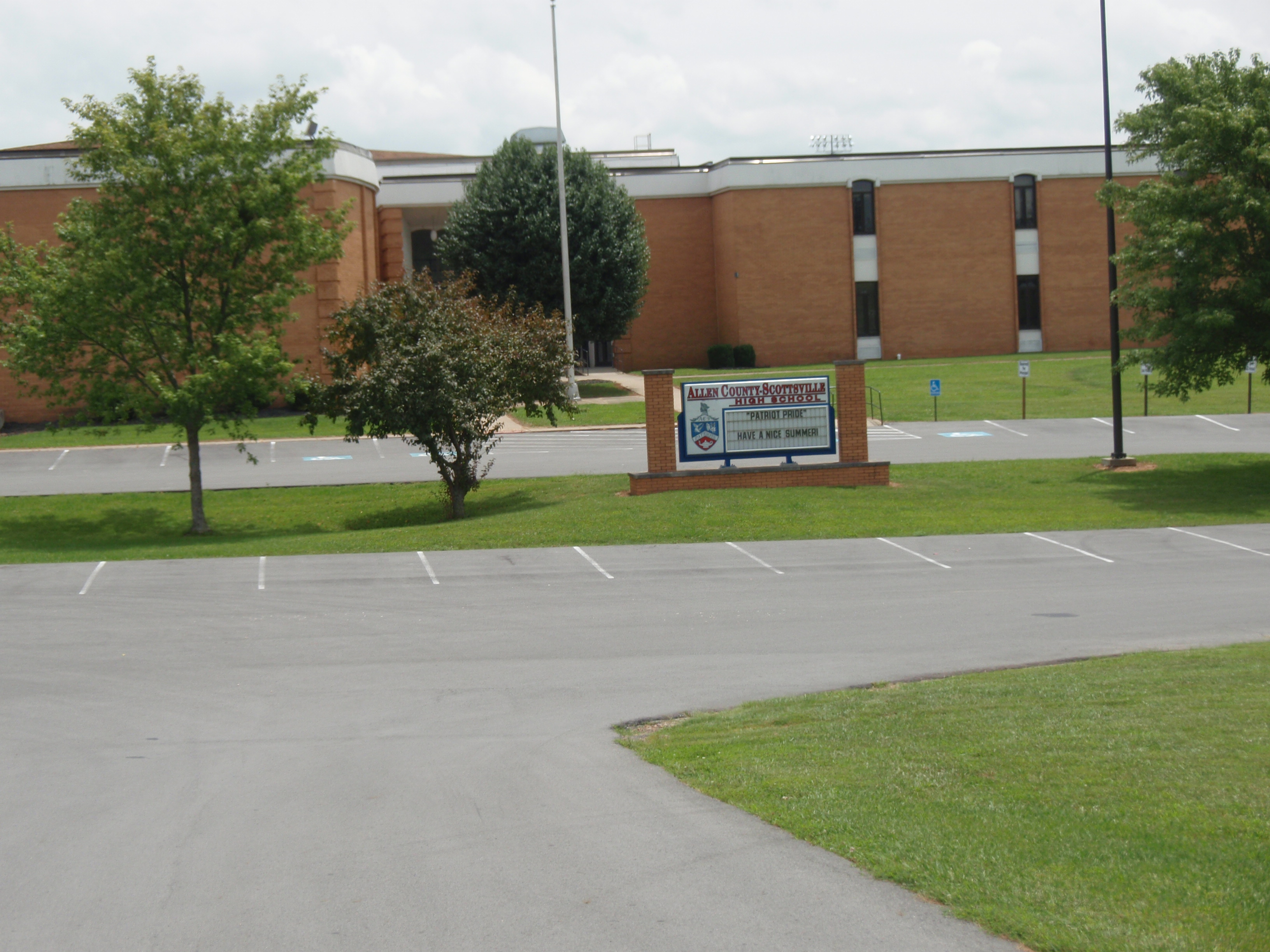

Location
- 1545 Bowling Green Road; Scottsville, Kentucky 42164

Information
- Type: Public
- Established: 1974
- School district: Allen County Schools
- Principal: Shane Humphrey
- Teaching staff: 52.42 (FTE)
- Grades: 9–12
- Enrollment: 879 (2023–2024)
- Student to teacher ratio: 16.77
- Colors: Red, White, and Blue
- Nickname: Patriots
- Feeder schools: James E Bazzell Middle School
- Website: Allen County-Scottsville High School

Allen County-Scottsville High School is located in Scottsville, Kentucky, United States. It was formed in the fall of 1974 by the consolidation of Scottsville High School and Allen County High School. It is the only high school in Allen County, Kentucky.

== Athletics ==
Allen County-Scottsville High School is a member of the Kentucky High School Athletic Association. Their mascot is the Patriots and their school colors are Red, White and Blue.

=== Boys' basketball ===
District Championships: 1981, 1982, 1984, 1992, 1994, 1995, 2005, 2006, 2007, 2009, 2010

Regional Championships: 1981, 1996

Boys' basketball record by year

Year	Coach	Record	Playoffs
1974–1975	Jim Marion	16-12	Regional Quarterfinals
1975–1976	Jim Marion	11-15	District Semifinals
1976–1977	Jim Marion	16-11	Regional Quarterfinals
1977–1978	Gary Shelton	16-4	District Semifinals
1978–1979	Gary Shelton	15-9	District Semifinals
1979–1980	Gary Shelton	17-10	Regional Quarterfinals
1980–1981	Gary Shelton	27-3	First round State
1981–1982	Gary Shelton	20-9	Regional Quarterfinals
1982–1983	Gary Shelton	13-15	Regional semifinals
1983–1984	Wendell Brown	17-10	Regional Quarterfinals
1984–1985	Mark Williams	6-17	District Semifinals
1985–1986	Mark Williams	2-23	District Semifinals
1986–1987	Mark Williams	6-19	District Semifinals
1987–1988	Mark Williams	17-11	District Semifinals
1988–1989	Mark Williams	5-21	District Semifinals
1989–1990	Jeff Hall	15-13	Regional semifinals
1990–1991	David Miller	16-9	District Semifinals
1991–1992	David Miller	14-20	Regional semifinals
1992–1993	David Miller	10-18	District Semifinals
1993–1994	J.D. Strange	21-11	Regional semifinals
1994–1995	J.D. Strange	21-9	Regional finals
1995–1996	J.D. Strange	29-5	State Quarterfinals
1996–1997	J.D. Strange	9-17	District Semifinals
1997–1998	J.D. Strange	7-18	District Semifinals
1998–1999	J.D. Strange	4-20	District Semifinals
1999–2000	Daryl Murphy	9-16	District Semifinals
2000–2001	Daryl Murphy	4-26	Regional Quarterfinals
2001–2002	D.G. Sherrill	5-22	District Semifinals
2002–2003	D.G. Sherrill	10-15	District Semifinals
2003–2004	D.G. Sherrill	20-9	Regional Quarterfinals
2004–2005	D.G. Sherrill	20-11	Regional semifinals
2005–2006	Scott Shelton	22-7	Regional Quarterfinals
2006–2007	Scott Shelton	25-6	Regional Quarterfinals
2007–2008	Scott Shelton	13-14	District Semifinals
2008–2009	Scott Shelton	21-11	Regional Quarterfinals
2009–2010	James Willett	16-13	Regional Quarterfinals
2010–2011	James Willett	12-15	District Semifinals
2011–2012	James Willett	11-20	District Semifinals
2012–2013	James Willett	15-17	Regional Quarterfinals
2013–2014	James Willett	11-18	District Semifinals
All Time Record			549-532

=== Girls basketball ===
2014-2015 District Champions, Region Champions, Sweet Sixteen, Elite Eight, Final Four, and State Runner Up
