= Bob Beatty =

American football player and coach (born 1955)

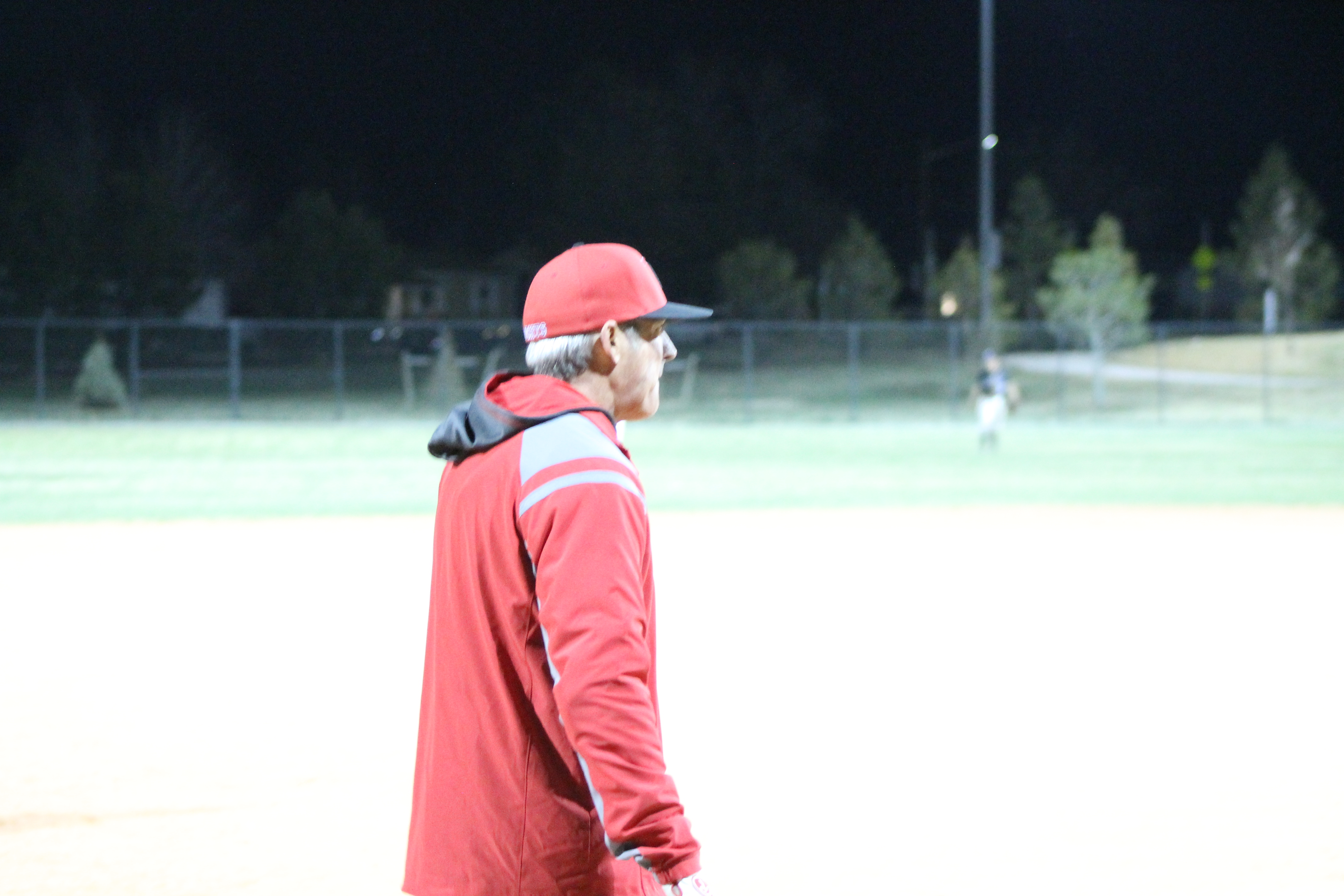
- Profile of Bob Beatty when coaching

Current position
- Title: Head Coach
- Team: Trinity Shamrocks
- Record: 241–42 (.852) (January 2019)

Biographical details
- Born: June 7, 1955 (age 71); Butler, Missouri, U.S.
- Education: Missouri Southern State College (BS)

Playing career
- 1973–1976: Pittsburg State

Coaching career (HC unless noted)
- 1978–1980: Clinton High School (assistant coach)
- 1981–1986: William Jewell College (Offensive Coordinator)
- 1986–1997: Blue Springs High School (Offensive Coordinator)
- 1997–2000: Blue Springs High School
- 2000–2020: Trinity High School

Head coaching record
- Overall: 231–42 (.846) (January 2019)

Accomplishments and honors

Championships
- MSHSAA State Champion (1992); 15× KSHAA State Champion (2001, 2002, 2003, 2005–2008, 2010, 2011, 2012, 2014, 2016, 2017, 2018, 2020); National Champion (2011)

Awards
- Key to the City (Louisville); Athlon Sports #10 High School Coach in America; 2012 Russell Athletic Coach of the Year; 2011 USA Today Coach of the Year

Records
- Most state championship wins in Kentucky State history
- Education: B.S. (Education)
- Occupations: High School Football Coach; High School Health Teacher
- Years active: 1978–present
- Spouse: Jayne Beatty (m. 1980)
- Children: 2

Robert Beatty (born June 7, 1955) is a football coach and the former head football coach for the Trinity Shamrocks, a high school American football team located at Trinity High School in Louisville, Kentucky. He is the most successful High School Football coach in Kentucky state history by championships won, with 15 state championship titles and one national championship during his nearly forty-year-long career.

== Background ==
Beatty was born on June 7, 1955, in Butler, Missouri, and was raised in and around the surrounding Bates County. In 1973, he attended Pittsburg State University until 1976, when he transferred to Missouri Southern State College, where he graduated in 1977 with a Bachelor's degree in Education. Beatty played on Pittsburg's football team from 1973 to 1976. In 1980, Beatty married his fiancée Jayne, who is also a teacher.

== Coaching career ==
=== Clinton High School ===
Beatty's coaching career began in 1978, when he began working as an assistant coach and teacher at Clinton High School in Clinton, Missouri, where he stayed for two years until he moved to William Jewell College.

=== William Jewell College ===
In 1980, Beatty accepted a job as the offensive coordinator for William Jewell College in Liberty, Missouri, where he worked until 1986. During his tenure, William Jewell reached the NAIA Division II Football National Championship quarterfinals four times, every year between 1980 and 1983. The team never won the championship; the Cardinals were eliminated in the 1980 and 1983 semifinals, the 1981 quarterfinals and the 1982 championship match. In 1986, Beatty left the college and moved to Blue Springs, Missouri. He was also a teacher during his time at the school.

==== 1982 National Championship ====
In 1982, while Beatty was offensive coordinator, William Jewell College reached the NAIA Division II Football National Championship, where they played against Linfield College. According to multiple sources, including the Kansas City Star and The Statesman Journal, which covered the event, William Jewell lost mainly because of the team's lackluster defense; as William Jewell's offensive team under Beatty scored an 86-yard touchdown in the first 19 seconds of the game. After the game, William Jewell head coach Vic Wallace said, "We haven't played against anybody who did a better job of attacking our defense than they did".

==== Coaching Record at William Jewell ====
Below is a year-by-year breakdown of Beatty's record while serving as offensive coordinator for the William Jewell Cardinals.

| Year | Team | Overall | Conference | Standing | Bowl/playoffs | Rank^{#} |
|---|---|---|---|---|---|---|
William Jewell (Heart of America Athletic Conference) (1980–1986)
| 1980 | William Jewell | 11–1–1 | 7–0–1 | 17 | L NAIA Division II Football National Championship | |
| 1981 | William Jewell | 11–1 | 8–0 | 19 | L NAIA Division II Football National Championship | |
| 1982 | William Jewell | 10–2 | 6–1 | 15 | L NAIA Division II Football National Championship | 6th |
| 1983 | William Jewell | 9–2–1 | 5–1–1 | 12 | L NAIA Division II Football National Championship | |
| 1984 | William Jewell | 6–4–1 | 4–2 | NR | | |
| 1985 | William Jewell | 7–3 | 6–1 | NR | | |
| 1986 | William Jewell | 4–6 | 4–3 | NR | | |
| Total: | | 58–19 (.753) | | | | |
National championship Conference title Conference division title or championship game berth
^{†}Indicates Bowl Coalition, Bowl Alliance, BCS, or CFP / New Years' Six bowl.; ^{#}Rankings from final Coaches Poll.

=== Blue Springs High School ===
In 1986, Beatty became the offensive coordinator at Blue Springs High School in Blue Springs, Missouri, remaining as such until 1997. During this time, Blue Springs won the 1992 MSHSAA State Football Championship and came second in the 1995 MSHSAA State Football Championship. In 1997, Beatty was offered the position of head coach, which he accepted and served in the role until 2000, when he moved to Louisville, Kentucky. Beatty was also a teacher during his employment at the school.

=== Trinity High School ===
Beatty moved to Trinity High School, Louisville in 2000 to be the head coach of the Trinity Shamrocks Football team. The next year, he led the team to victory over rivals Male High School in the state championships. Beatty's teams also won the state championships in 2002, 2003, 2005, 2006, 2007, 2008, 2010, 2011 and 2012. In 2013, the Shamrocks finished the season 6–6; Beatty took this as a sign he needed a complete restructure, saying, "It's been a long time since we ended a season with a loss. You find out whether you want to spit that taste out of your mouth or swallow it again."

Beatty removed all but one of his defensive coordinators and hired Jay Cobb—a former head coach at Knott County Central, Somerset, and Campbellsville—as the new defensive coordinator. After the changes, Trinity won the state championship in 2014, 2016, and 2017. In addition to serving as Trinity's head football coach, Beatty also works as a teacher for freshmen at the school. He teaches a course that combines physical education and health education.

==== State championship record ====
Below is a list of Trinity High School's state championship wins during Beatty's time as head coach:

| Year | Class | Opponent | Score |
|---|---|---|---|
| 2001 | 4A | Male | 45–19 |
| 2002 | 4A | Male | 59–56 |
| 2003 | 4A | Saint Xavier | 17–14 |
| 2005 | 4A | Saint Xavier | 14–6 |
| 2006 | 4A | Ryle | 46–7 |
| 2007 | 6A | Saint Xavier | 34–28 |
| 2008 | 6A | Simon Kenton | 48–0 |
| 2010 | 6A | Male | 38–0 |
| 2011 | 6A | Scott County | 62–21 |
| 2012 | 6A | PRP | 61–7 |
| 2014 | 6A | Dixie Heights | 47–14 |
| 2016 | 6A | Lexington Lafayette | 56–21 |
| 2017 | 6A | Saint Xavier | 38–21 |
| 2019 | 6A | Male | 28–6 |
| State Championships | | | 14 |

==== Coaching Record at Trinity ====
Below is a year-by-year breakdown of Beatty's coaching record at Trinity.

| Year | Team | Overall | Bowl/playoffs | Litkenhous^{#} | MaxPreps^{°} |
|---|---|---|---|---|---|
Trinity Shamrocks (Kentucky High School Athletic Association (KHSAA)) (2001–2016)
| 2000 | Trinity | 13–2 | L KHSAA Commonwealth Gridiron Bowl | N/A | N/A |
| 2001 | Trinity | 13–1 | W KHSAA Commonwealth Gridiron Bowl | N/A | N/A |
| 2002 | Trinity | 15–0 | W KHSAA Commonwealth Gridiron Bowl | N/A | N/A |
| 2003 | Trinity | 11–4 | W KHSAA Commonwealth Gridiron Bowl | N/A | N/A |
| 2004 | Trinity | 10–2 | L KHSAA Commonwealth Gridiron Bowl | N/A | #6 |
| 2005 | Trinity | 13–2 | W KHSAA Commonwealth Gridiron Bowl | N/A | #1 |
| 2006 | Trinity | 14–1 | W KHSAA Commonwealth Gridiron Bowl | N/A | #1 |
| 2007 | Trinity | 13–2 | W KHSAA Commonwealth Gridiron Bowl | N/A | #1 |
| 2008 | Trinity | 14–1 | W KHSAA Commonwealth Gridiron Bowl | N/A | #1 |
| 2009 | Trinity | 9–5 | L KHSAA Commonwealth Gridiron Bowl | N/A | #4 |
| 2010 | Trinity | 14–1 | W KHSAA Commonwealth Gridiron Bowl | #1 | #1 |
| 2011 | Trinity | 14–0 | W KHSAA Commonwealth Gridiron Bowl; W High School Football National Championship | #1 | #1 |
| 2012 | Trinity | 13–1 | W KHSAA Commonwealth Gridiron Bowl | #1 | #1 |
| 2013 | Trinity | 6–6 | L KHSAA Commonwealth Gridiron Bowl | #4 | #4 |
| 2014 | Trinity | 11–5 | W KHSAA Commonwealth Gridiron Bowl | #1 | #1 |
| 2015 | Trinity | 11–2 | L KHSAA Commonwealth Gridiron Bowl | #3 | #2 |
| 2016 | Trinity | 15–0 | W KHSAA Commonwealth Gridiron Bowl | #1 | #1 |
| 2017 | Trinity | 15–0 | W KHSAA Commonwealth Gridiron Bowl | #1 | #1 |
| 2018 | Trinity | 7-7 | L KHSAA Commonwealth Gridiron Bowl | #6 | #9 |
| Trinity: | | 231–42 (.846) | | | |
| Total: | | 231–42 (.846) | | | |
National championship Conference title Conference division title or championship game berth
^{†}Indicates Bowl Coalition, Bowl Alliance, BCS, or CFP / New Years' Six bowl.; ^{#}The Courier-Journal's Litkenhous Ratings.; ^{°}MaxPreps KYHS Rankings.

_{* Indicates Season in Progress}

=== U.S. Army All-American Bowl ===
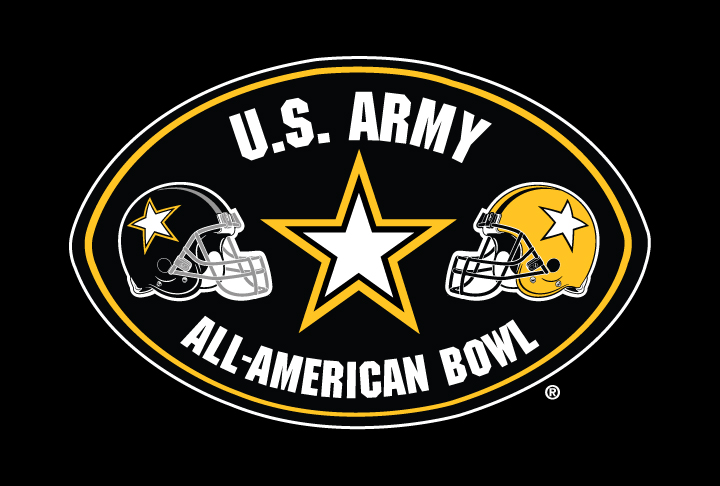
The official logo of the U.S. Army All-American Bowl

==== 2012 All-American Bowl ====
In 2012, Beatty was selected to be one of the West's assistant coaches at the U.S. Army All-American Bowl. He was responsible for coaching the team's offensive players. That year, the West won 24–12.

==== 2013 All-American Bowl ====
In 2013, Beatty was chosen to be the East's head coach, where his team won 15–8. Beatty was accompanied to the Bowl by Trinity wide receiver James Quick, who was also selected to be the 2013 MVP.

=== Coaching method ===
In late May 2013, a Trinity player told Beatty, "I can't wait for practice to start."; Beatty reportedly was surprised by the remark and replied, "You're ready for me to scream and yell and cuss and spit?". "Sure," the player said. "You're not my friend. You're my coach." According to Beatty, he smiled because that is how he approaches his players. "I don't have 17-year-old friends, I have 17-year-old champions."

According to Beatty, his team trains, practices, and plays for eleven months of the year. In 2013, he stated, "If you are going to be in this program, you have to punch the clock". In late April, when Beatty starts practices for the next season, he reportedly tells his players, "You better pray hard, because you belong to me now". He said in an interview, "We try to get more done in two hours than other teams do in two weeks. There are no superfluous meetings. It's all about efficiency and winning."

== Former players ==
Beatty has sent many of his former players to the NCAA D-I level and to the NFL. From 2000 to 2003, he coached quarterback Brian Brohm, who was featured on the cover of Sports Illustrated while he was a junior in high school at Trinity and later played at Louisville, the Green Bay Packers and Buffalo Bills. Beatty also coached former quarterback Nick Petrino, who is the son of Louisville Football coach Bobby Petrino.

Beatty coached former Trinity wide receiver James Quick, who graduated in 2013 as a U.S. Army Bowl participant and won the Kentucky Mr. Football award. In 2017, Quick signed to join the Washington Redskins.

During his nearly forty-year-long career, Beatty has sent over sixty former players to the collegiate level and four former players to the National Football League.

=== Notable former Blue Springs players under Beatty ===
Below is an incomplete list of notable former Blue Springs players under Beatty:

| Graduation Year | Player | Position | Team |
|---|---|---|---|
| 1997 | Ladell Betts | Running back | New Orleans Saints |
| 1999 | Brandon Lloyd | Wide receiver | San Francisco 49ers |
| Former Blue Springs players | | | 2 |

=== Notable former Trinity players under Beatty ===
Below is an incomplete list of notable former Trinity players under Beatty:

| Graduation Year | Player | Position | Team |
|---|---|---|---|
| 2003 | Brian Brohm | Quarterback | Louisville |
| 2008 | Alex Kupper | Offensive lineman | Louisville |
| 2013 | Dalyn Dawkins | Running back | Colorado State |
| 2014 | Reggie Bonnafon | Quarterback | Louisville |
| 2018 | Rondale Moore | Wide receiver | Purdue |
Former Trinity football players

== Awards and recognition ==
In 2011, Beatty was named by USA Today as the 2011 Coach of the Year.

In 2012, he was named the Russel Athletic Coach of the Year. The award honors the nation's top high school football coach, recognizing exceptional coaching abilities and leadership skills, and serving as a positive influence on the youth of America.

In 2013, he was named by Athlon Sports as the tenth-most influential high school football coach in the U.S.

On January 10, 2017, he was awarded the Key to the City of Louisville, Kentucky by the city's mayor and Trinity graduate Greg Fischer.

== Personal life ==
Beatty and his wife Jayne have two adult children, Jennifer and David. In 2005, David graduated from Trinity High School, where Beatty was the head coach.

=== Friendship with Bobby Petrino ===
According to Beatty, he and former Louisville Cardinals head football coach Bobby Petrino have a long history and friendship. Petrino has recruited and coached multiple former Trinity players, including quarterback Brian Brohm and Washington Redskins wide receiver James Quick. Beatty has also coached Petrino's son Nick at Trinity High School. According to Beatty, the two have reportedly talked at length about football since Beatty moved to Louisville in 2000. Beatty also credits Petrino with helping him through some "growing pains" he experienced when he started coaching at Trinity.

In 2014, when Beatty was asked whether Petrino had ever discussed giving him a job on his previous staffs, Beatty said, "I'm not going to say that I haven't, but it hasn't presented itself yet, so we'll worry about that if the time comes". Beatty also said he has been grateful Petrino has "always treated high school coaches with the utmost respect" and has been willing to swap ideas with them. According to Beatty, "There have been times I would go to (U of L's) practice, and all of a sudden I'll see something that I've done [at Trinity], and he'll look over at me and say, 'Hey, where did I get that?'".
