= KHSAA Commonwealth Gridiron Bowl =

Kentucky state high school football championships

The KHSAA Commonwealth Gridiron Bowl is a series of football games, typically held on the first weekend of December, that determine the high school champions of the U.S. state of Kentucky. The tournaments that lead to the championship games, as well as regular-season competition, are governed by the Kentucky High School Athletic Association (KHSAA).

== History ==
The KHSAA began conducting state football championships in 1959. Throughout its history, the competition has been divided into classes based on enrollment (though with historic exceptions noted below). The history of classifications is as follows:

- 1959–1974: Three-class system. All schools in Jefferson County, which includes (and is now consolidated with) the state's largest city of Louisville, were placed in Class 3A regardless of enrollment. Remaining schools were placed in Class 2A or A based on enrollment.
- 1975–1986: Quasi-four-class system. Initially, all high schools in Jefferson County were placed in Class 4A regardless of enrollment, though by the end of this era smaller schools began to be placed in their appropriate enrollment classes. In this era, there were two separate 4A champions—a "State 4A" winner from outside Jefferson County and a "Jefferson County 4A" champion—that would meet for an overall 4A title.
- 1987–2006: True four-class system, with all Jefferson County schools classified according to their enrollment.
- 2007–present: Six-class system, again based on enrollment, but with a slight change in calculation of enrollment. Historically, schools were classified based on total enrollment in grades 9 to 12, with all-boys schools treated as having twice their actual enrollment. With the expansion to six classes, the KHSAA changed the basis for classification to enrollment of boys only in the same grades.

Traditionally, the championship games were held in Louisville, first at the old Cardinal Stadium on the grounds of the Kentucky Exposition Center and later at L&N Federal Credit Union Stadium, previously known as Papa John's Cardinal Stadium, on the campus of the University of Louisville. From 2009 to 2016, the games moved to Houchens Industries–L. T. Smith Stadium on the campus of Western Kentucky University in Bowling Green. In 2017, the KHSAA announced that the 2017 and 2018 games will be played at Kroger Field on the campus of the University of Kentucky in Lexington. With the expansion to six classes, the Gridiron Bowl is now a two-day affair, with three championship games on Friday and three on Saturday.

== List of champions ==
Below is a complete list of state champions from all six of the KHSAA Divisions

=== 6A state champions ===
Year	Champion	Score	Opponent	State champion head coach
2025	Trinity	28-14	South Warren	Jay Cobb
2024	Trinity	42-23	Ryle	Jay Cobb
2023	Trinity	41-20	Bryan Station	Jay Cobb
2022	Bullitt East	28-27	Male	Keegan Kendrick
2021	St. Xavier	31-21	Male	Kevin Wallace
2020	Trinity	28-0	Male	Bob Beatty
2019	Trinity	28-6	Male	Bob Beatty
2018	Male	37-20	Scott County	Chris Wolfe
2017	Trinity	38-21	St. Xavier	Bob Beatty
2016	Trinity	56-21	Lafayette	Bob Beatty
2015	Male	41-14	Lafayette	Chris Wolfe
2014	Trinity	47-14	Dixie Heights	Bob Beatty
2013	Scott County	21-14	Meade County	Jim Mckee
2012	Trinity	61-7	Pleasure Ridge Park	Bob Beatty
2011	Trinity	62-21	Scott County	Bob Beatty
2010	Trinity	38-0	Male	Bob Beatty
2009	St. Xavier	34–10	Trinity	Mike Glaser
2008	Trinity	48-0	Simon Kenton	Bob Beatty
2007	Trinity	34-28 OT	St. Xavier	Bob Beatty

=== 5A State Champions ===
Year	Champion	Score	Opponent	State Champion Head coach
2025	Owensboro	35-7	Pulaski County	Damarcus Ganaway Sr.
2024	Bowling Green	37-20	Cooper	Mark Spader
2023	Bowling Green	28-14	Cooper	Mark Spader
2022	Frederick Douglas	28-7	Bowling Green	Nathan McPeek
2021	South Warren	38-26	Frederick Douglass	Brandon Smith
2020	Bowling Green	17-7	Owensboro	Mark Spader
2019	Covington Catholic	14-7	Frederick Douglass	Edward Eviston
2018	South Warren	20-16	Covington Catholic	Brandon Smith
2017	Covington Catholic	49-13	Madison Southern	Edward Eviston
2016	Bowling Green	70-22	Pulaski County	Kevin Wallace Sr.
2015	Bowling Green	21-7	Pulaski County	Kevin Wallace Sr.
2014	Pulaski County	14-7	Graves County	John Hines
2013	Bowling Green	49-14	Pulaski County	Kevin Wallace Sr.
2012	Bowling Green	34–20	Cooper	Kevin Wallace Sr.
2011	Bowling Green	55–3	Anderson County	Kevin Wallace Sr.
2010	Highlands	50–0	Christian County	Dale Mueller
2009	Highlands	35-7	John Hardin	Dale Mueller
2008	Highlands	35-15	Christian County	Dale Mueller
2007	Highlands	28-7	Bowling Green	Dale Mueller

=== 4A State Champions ===
Year	State Champion	Score	State Runner-Up	State Champion Head coach
2025	Boyle County	34-0	Franklin County	Justin Haddix
2024	Paducah Tilghman	27–20	Franklin County	Sean Thompson
2023	Boyle County	41-0	Covington Catholic	Justin Haddix
2022	Boyle County	32-26	Corbin	Justin Haddix
2021	Boyle County	30-13	Johnson Central	Justin Haddix
2020	Boyle County	31-28 OT	Franklin County	Justin Haddix
2019	Johnson Central	21-20	Boyle County	Jim Matney
2018	Franklin-Simpson	14-12	Johnson Central	Doug Preston
2017	Franklin-Simpson	35-21	Johnson Central	Doug Preston
2016	Johnson Central	48-0	Franklin-Simpson	Jim Matney
2015	South Warren	36-6	Johnson Central	Brandon Smith
2014	Highlands	49-42	Owensboro	Brian Weinrich .
2013	Collins	37-34	Highlands	Jerry Lucas
2012	Highlands	47-0	Collins	Dale Mueller
2011	Highlands	42-14	Franklin-Simpson	Dale Mueller
2010	Boyle County	21–14	Allen County-Scottsville	Larry French
2009	Boyle County	42-39 (2 OT)	Lone Oak^{a}	Larry French
2008	Bell County	15-13	Bullitt East	Dudley Hilton
2007	Lexington Catholic	49-7	Lone Oak	Bill Letton
2006	Trinity (14)	41-7	Ryle	Bob Beatty
2005	Trinity (13)	14-6	St. Xavier	Bob Beatty
2004	St. Xavier (8)	49-9	Scott County	Mike Glaser
2003	Trinity (12)	17-14	St. Xavier	Bob Beatty
2002	Trinity (11)	59-56	Male	Bob Beatty
2001	Trinity (10)	45-19	Male	Bob Beatty
2000	Male (3)	34-14	Trinity	Bob Redman
1999	St. Xavier (7)	34-31 OT	Bryan Station	Mike Glaser
1998	Male (2)	31-7	Tates Creek	Bob Redman
1997	St. Xavier (6)	3-0	Trinity	Mike Glaser
1996	Nelson County (1)	35-34 OT	Paul Dunbar	Mark Brown
1995	St. Xavier (5)	26-0	Henry Clay	Mike Glaser
1994	Trinity (9)	21-7	Boone County	Dennis Lampley
1993	Male (1)	29-7	Shelby County	Bob Redman
1992	St. Xavier (4)	3-0	Boone County	Mike Glaser
1991	George Rogers Clark (1)	28-21	St. Xavier	Don Danko
1990	Trinity (8)	27-14	Warren Central	Dennis Lampley
1989	Trinity (7)	28-14	Warren Central	Dennis Lampley
1988	Trinity (6)	28-0	DuPont Manual	Dennis Lampley
1987	Shelby County (1)	17-14	Boone County	Tom Becherer
1986	St. Xavier (3)	27-14	Boone County	Mike Glaser
1985	Trinity (5)	28-7	Lafayette	Dennis Lampley
1984	Christian County (2)	14-10	Ballard	Dan Goble
1983	Trinity (4)	26-7	Owensboro	Roger Gruneisen
1982	Christian County (1)	10-3	Southern	Dan Goble
1981	Henry Clay (1)	20-7	DeSales	Jake Bell
1980	Trinity (3)	31-8	Paducah Tilghman^{b}	Roger Gruneisen
1979	Butler (1)	21-7	Henry Clay	Joe Hood
1978	St. Xavier (2)	42-21	Tates Creek	Mike Stewart
1977	Trinity (2)	28-7	Greenup County	Dave Moore
1976	Trinity (1)	28-24	Henderson County	Dave Moore
1975	St. Xavier (1)	20-0	Ashland Blazer	Bill Glaser

=== 3A State Champions ===
Year	State Champion	Score	State Runner-Up	State Champion Head coach
2025	Christian Academy-Louisville	42-7	Murray	Thomas Cantwell
2024	Christian Academy-Louisville	42-21	Union County	Thomas Cantwell
2023	Christian Academy-Louisville	41-16	Bell County	Thomas Cantwell
2022	Christian Academy-Louisville	38-0	Bardstown	Thomas Cantwell
2021	Belfry	33-28	Paducah Tilghman^{b}	Philip Haywood
2020	Ashland Blazer	35-14	Elizabethtown	Tony Love
2019	Belfry	30-20	Bell County	Philip Haywood
2018	Louisville Central	20-19	Corbin	Marvin Dantzler
2017	Boyle County	40-21	Corbin	Chuck Smith
2016	Belfry	52-31	Louisville Central	Philip Haywood
2015	Belfry	43-0	Lexington Catholic	Philip Haywood
2014	Belfry	14-7	Louisville Central	Philip Haywood
2013	Belfry	3-0	Wayne County	Philip Haywood
2012	Louisville Central	12-6 (OT)	Belfry	Ty Scroggins
2011	Louisville Central	15-14	Belfry	Ty Scroggins
2010	Louisville Central	46–7	Belfry	Ty Scroggins
2009	Paducah Tilghman	21–0	Somerset	Randy Wyatt
2008	Louisville Central	40-19	Breathitt County	Ty Scroggins
2007	Louisville Central	27-17	Belfry	Ty Scroggins
2006	Covington Catholic	28-7	Bowling Green	Jon Rodenberg
2005	Lexington Catholic	49-21	Bowling Green	Bob Spire
2004	Highlands	22-6	Boyle County	Dale Mueller
2003	Boyle County	44-10	Highlands	Chuck Smith
2002	Boyle County	21-0	Rockcastle County	Chuck Smith
2001	Boyle County	49-14	Rockcastle County	Chuck Smith
2000	Highlands	48-27	Owensboro	Dale Mueller
1999	Highlands	48-10	Waggener	Dale Mueller
1998	Highlands	56-7	Waggener	Dale Mueller
1997	Covington Catholic	21-13	Hopkinsville	Lynn Ray
1996	Highlands	21-14	Hopkinsville	Dale Mueller
1995	Bowling Green	28-12	Highlands	Dan Haley
1994	Covington Catholic	24-21	Bowling Green	Lynn Ray
1993	Covington Catholic	28-13	Lincoln County	Lynn Ray
1992	Highlands	15-6	Paducah Tilghman	Tom Duffy
1991	Bell County	35-13	Meade County	Dudley Hilton
1990	Paul Blazer	45-13	Lincoln County	Vic Marsh
1989	Highlands	27-3	Paducah Tilghman	Tom Duffy
1988	Covington Catholic	30-24 OT	Paducah Tilghman	Lynn Ray
1987	Covington Catholic	16-6	Paducah Tilghman	Lynn Ray
1986	Owensboro	14-0	Belfry	Larry Moore
1985	Paducah Tilghman	29-14	Belfry	Allan Cox
1984	Danville	24-6	Hopkinsville	Tom Duffy
1983	Conner	12-7	Franklin-Simpson	Bob Lewis
1982	Highlands	6-0	Franklin-Simpson	Bob Herrmann
1981	Highlands	40-24	Elizabethtown	Bob Herrmann
1980	Franklin-Simpson	16-0	Conner	James Matthews
1979	Franklin-Simpson	33-0	Belfry	James Matthews
1978	Russell	17-7	Woodford County	Ivan McGlone
1977	Highlands	6-0	Shelby County	Bob Herrmann
1976	Lloyd Memorial	30-0	Shelby County	Jim Dougherty
1975	Highlands	21-0	Franklin-Simpson	Roger Walz
1974	St. Xavier	48-14	Westport^{c}	Bill Glaser
1973	Trinity	16-0	Southern	Dave Moore
1972	Trinity	21-0	Butler	Jim Kennedy
1971	Flaget	7-7	Thomas Jefferson	Peter Compise
1970	Butler	20-0	Trinity	Elmer Collina
1969	St. Xavier	15-0	Butler	Leon Dunagan
1968	Trinity	29-18	Seneca	Jim Kennedy
1967	Flaget	21-0	Thomas Jefferson	Norm Mackin
1966	DuPont Manual	33-6	Butler	Charlie Bentley
1965	Seneca	13-12	Flaget	Ron Cain
1964	Male	27-0	Eastern	Charlie Kuhn
1963	Male	23-7	Waggener	Charlie Kuhn
1962	St. Xavier	7-6	Valley	Johnny Meihaus
1961	Flaget	41-13	Fairdale	Paulie Miller
1960	Male	1-0	Eastern	Charlie Kuhn
1959	DuPont Manual	44-14	Durrett^{c}	Tom Harper

=== 2A State Champions ===
Year	Champion	Score	Opponent	State Champion Head coach
2025	Lexington Christian	33-28	Owensboro Catholic	Oakley Watkins
2024	Beechwood	50–34	Owensboro Catholic	Jay Volker
2023	Mayfield	53-48	Owensboro Catholic	Joe Morris
2022	Beechwood	14-13	Mayfield	Noel Rash
2021	Beechwood	23-21	Lexington Christian	Noel Rash
2020	Beechwood	24-23 OT	Lexington Christian	Noel Rash
2019	Somerset	34-31	Mayfield	Robbie Lucas
2018	Christian Academy-Louisville	34-26	Mayfield	Stefan LeFors
2017	Danville	35-21	Mayfield	Clay Clevenger
2016	Christian Academy-Louisville	24-6	Danville	Stefan LeFors
2015	Mayfield	17-7	Newport Central Catholic	Joe Morris
2014	DeSales	26-0	Newport Central Catholic	Harold Davis
2013	DeSales	34-26	Newport Central Catholic	Harold Davis
2012	Newport Central Catholic	30–26	Caldwell County	Edward Eviston
2011	Covington Holy Cross	33-14	Glasgow	Bruce Kozerski
2010	Newport Central Catholic	42–0	Owensboro Catholic	Edward Eviston
2009	Fort Campbell	29–9	DeSales	Shawn Berner
2008	Fort Campbell	26-23	Newport Central Catholic	Shawn Berner
2007	Fort Campbell	21-7	Newport Central Catholic	Shawn Berner
2006	Mercer County	15-12	Russell	Marty Jaggers
2005	Russell	27-14	Owensboro Catholic	Ivan McGlone
2004	Belfry	28-21	Owensboro Catholic	Philip Haywood
2003	Belfry	33-27 OT	Elizabethtown	Philip Haywood
2002	Breathitt County	52-0	Corbin	Mike Holcomb
2001	Bardstown	47-16	Prestonsburg	Joey Downs
2000	Boyle County	38-6	Glasgow	Chuck Smith
1999	Boyle County	29-6	Glasgow	Chuck Smith
1998	Caldwell County	38-28	Danville	Pat Gates
1997	Bourbon County	39-28	Owensboro Catholic	Dudley Hilton
1996	Breathitt County	25-21	Fort Knox	Mike Holcomb
1995	Breathitt County	42-35 2OT	Franklin-Simpson	Mike Holcomb
1994	Danville	39-7	Bullitt East	Sam Harp
1993	Mayfield	13-12	Prestonsburg	Paul Leahy
1992	Danville	34-7	Mayfield	Sam Harp
1991	Danville	17-14	Mayfield	Sam Harp
1990	Fort Knox	21-7	Corbin	Joe Jaggers
1989	Danville	7-3	Mayfield	Sam Harp
1988	Fort Knox	45-21	Somerset	Joe Jaggers
1987	Danville	24-23	Mayfield	Tom Duffy
1986	Mayfield	21-20 OT	Newport Catholic	Jack Morris
1985	Mayfield	18-8	Newport Catholic	Jack Morris
1984	Newport Catholic	12-7	Fort Knox	Bob Schneider
1983	Fort Knox	19-14	Somerset	Joe Jaggers
1982	Corbin	18-6	Glasgow	Larry "Cotton" Adams
1981	Bardstown	20-6	Somerset	Garnis Martin
1980	Corbin	16-7	Fort Campbell	Archie Powers
1979	Fort Campbell	26-0	Pikeville	Marshall Patterson
1978	Mayfield	22-6	Somerset	Jack Morris
1977	Mayfield	14-13	Corbin	Jack Morris
1976	Corbin	6-0	Mayfield	Archie Powers
1975	Scott County	22-20	Middlesboro	Bill Wilson
1974	Owensboro	14-7	Middlesboro	Gerald Poynter
1973	Paducah Tilghman	27-8	Boyd County	Dan Haley
1972	Tates Creek	16-7	Paul Blazer	Roy Walton
1971	Bryan Station	14-3	Madisonville	Terry Clark
1970	Highlands	30-13	Madisonville	Mike Murphy
1969	Elizabethtown	21-8	Bryan Station	Vince Hancock
1968	Highlands	32-7	Elizabethtown	Mike Murphy
1967	Paul Blazer	19-14	Elizabethtown	Jake Hallum
1966	Hopkinsville	27-6	Highlands	Fleming Thornton
1965	Hopkinsville	24-6	Middlesboro	Fleming Thornton
1964	Highlands	36-7	Madison	Owen Hauck
1963	Caldwell County	14-7	Highlands	Fred Clayton
1962	Danville	13-6	Corbin	Ray Callahan
1961	Highlands	12-0	Madison	Homer Rice
1960	Highlands	21-13	Lafayette	Homer Rice
1959	Henderson	12-7	Highlands	Don Shelton

=== 1A State Champions ===
Year	Champion	Score	Opponent	State Champion Head coach
2025	Kentucky Country Day	20-16	Raceland	Matthew Jones
2024	Sayre	27–22	Raceland	Chad Pennington
2023	Pikeville	21–0	Raceland	Chris McNamee
2022	Pikeville	41–9	Raceland	Chris McNamee
2021	Pikeville	30–27	Russellville	Chris McNamee
2020	Paintsville	38–7	Kentucky Country Day	Joe Chirico
2019	Pikeville	43–0	Paintsville	Chris McNamee
2018	Beechwood	21–20	Pikeville	Noel Rash
2017	Beechwood	41–0	Raceland	Noel Rash
2016	Beechwood	21–14	Hazard	Noel Rash
2015	Pikeville	42–28	Beechwood	Chris McNamee
2014	Mayfield	28–27 OT	Williamsburg	Joe Morris
2013	Mayfield	42–0	Williamsburg	Joe Morris
2012	Mayfield	55–8	Fairview	Joe Morris
2011	Hazard	24–6	Mayfield	Mark Dixon
2010	Mayfield	47–6	Hazard High School	Joe Morris
2009	Lexington Christian	55–19	Mayfield	Paul Rains
2008	Beechwood	14–7	Hazard	Noel Rash
2007	Beechwood	38–35	Lexington Christian	Noel Rash
2006	Newport Central Catholic	37–34	Danville	Bob Schneider
2005	Newport Central Catholic	42–7	Mayfield	Bob Schneider
2004	Beechwood	23–7	Danville	Mike Yeagle
2003	Danville	42–7	Beechwood	Sam Harp
2002	Mayfield	14–7	Beechwood	Joe Morris
2001	Danville	14–13	Newport Central Catholic	Sam Harp
2000	Danville	23–9	Newport Central Catholic	Sam Harp
1999	Beechwood	45–22	Hancock County	Mike Yeagle
1998	Middlesboro	27–6	Mayfield	Ken Roark
1997	Beechwood	26–0	Harrodsburg	Mike Yeagle
1996	Beechwood	21–14 OT	Harrodsburg	Mike Yeagle
1995	Mayfield	28–27	Beechwood	Paul Leahy
1994	Beechwood	18–16	Murray	Mike Yeagle
1993	Beechwood	13–12	Bardstown	Mike Yeagle
1992	Beechwood	21–14	Bardstown	Mike Yeagle
1991	Beechwood	34–6	Pikeville	Mike Yeagle
1990	Russellville	21–7	Bellevue	Ken Barrett
1989	Pikeville	20–7	Trigg County	Hillard Howard
1988	Pikeville	28–10	Harrodsburg	Hillard Howard
1987	Pikeville	28–6	Russellville	Hillard Howard
1986	Heath^{a}	27–12	Cumberland	Rodney Bushong
1985	Crittenden County	14–6	Paintsville	Pat Gates
1984	Beechwood	35–26	Paris	Bernie Barre
1983	Russellville	42–13	Cumberland	Ken Barrett
1982	Paris	35–6	Cumberland	Randy Reese
1981	Paris	19–7	Bellevue	Randy Reese
1980	Russellville	16–0	Bellevue	Ken Barrett
1979	Bellevue	7–0	Madison	Fred Bernier
1978	Fort Campbell	15–13	Paintsville	Marshall Patterson
1977	Bellevue	21–0	Frankfort	Bill Baldridge
1976	Fort Campbell	22–0	Bellevue	Marshall Patterson
1975	Ludlow	7–6	Heath^{a}	Randy Reese
1974	Murray	14–0	Beechwood	John Hina
1973	Paris	21–12	Elkhorn City	Homer Goins
1972	Trigg County	22–0	Pikeville	Joe Jaggers
1971	Trigg County	30–23	Lynch East Main	Joe Jaggers
1970	Bardstown	13–6	Lynch East Main	Garnis Martin
1969	Mt. Sterling	21–13	Bardstown	Charles Ishmael
1968	Lynch East Main	14–6	Frankfort	Ed Miracle
1967	Bardstown	20–13	Mt. Sterling	Garnis Martin
1966	Dayton	6–2	Russellville	Ray King
1965	Lloyd Memorial	27–0	Old Kentucky Home	Jack Turner
1964	Elkhorn City	33–7	Russellville	Jack Hall
1963	Lynch East Main	13–6	Shelbyville	Ed Miracle
1962	Versailles	21–0	Lynch East Main	John Snowden
1961	Murray	14–13	Lynch East Main	Ty Holland
1960	Lynch East Main	39–0	Murray	Ed Miracle
1959	Lynch East Main	40–0	Henderson Douglas	Ed Miracle

=== Championships, by schools ===
The following is a list of all schools that have won at least one KHSAA Commonwealth Gridiron Bowl Championship, along with what years they have won their championship(s).

School	Titles	Years
Trinity	30	1968, 1972, 1973, 1976, 1977, 1980, 1983, 1985, 1988, 1989, 1990, 1994, 2001, 2002, 2003, 2005, 2006, 2007, 2008, 2010, 2011, 2012, 2014, 2016, 2017, 2019, 2020, 2023, 2024, 2025
Ft. Thomas Highlands	23	1960, 1961, 1964, 1968, 1970, 1975, 1977, 1981, 1982, 1989, 1992, 1996, 1998, 1999, 2000, 2004, 2007, 2008, 2009, 2010, 2011, 2012, 2014
Beechwood	18	1984, 1991, 1992, 1993, 1994, 1996, 1997, 1999, 2004, 2007, 2008, 2016, 2017, 2018, 2020, 2021, 2022, 2024
Boyle County	13	1999, 2000, 2001, 2002, 2003, 2009, 2010, 2017, 2020, 2021, 2022, 2023, 2025
Mayfield	13	1977, 1978, 1985, 1986, 1993, 1995, 2002, 2010, 2012, 2013, 2014, 2015, 2023
St. Xavier	13	1962, 1969, 1974, 1975, 1978, 1986, 1992, 1995, 1997, 1999, 2004, 2009, 2021
Danville	11	1962, 1984, 1987, 1989, 1991, 1992, 1994, 2000, 2001, 2003, 2017
Bowling Green	9	1995, 2011, 2012, 2013, 2015, 2016, 2020, 2023, 2024
Belfry	8	2003, 2004, 2013, 2014, 2015, 2016, 2019, 2021
Covington Catholic	8	1987, 1988, 1993, 1994, 1997, 2006, 2017, 2019
Male	8	1960, 1963, 1964, 1993, 1998, 2000, 2015, 2018
Pikeville	8	1987, 1988, 1989, 2015, 2019, 2021, 2022, 2023
Central	6	2007, 2008, 2010, 2011, 2012, 2018
Christian Academy-Louisville	6	2016, 2018, 2022, 2023, 2024, 2025
DuPont Manual	6	1925, 1936, 1938, 1948, 1959, 1966
Fort Campbell	6	1976, 1978, 1979, 2007, 2008, 2009
Newport Central Catholic	5	1984, 2005, 2006, 2010, 2012
Bardstown	4	1967, 1970, 1981, 2001
Franklin-Simpson	4	1979, 1980, 2017, 2018
Lynch	4	1959, 1960, 1963, 1968
Paducah Tilghman	4	1973, 1985, 2009, 2024

== Notes ==
^aConsolidated into today's McCracken County High School as Mustangs on August 9, 2013.
^bTilghman did not participate in the McCracken County High consolidation, as it is operated by a separate district.
^cSchool is now defunct
