= Troy Yocum =

Iraq War veteran (1979–2022)

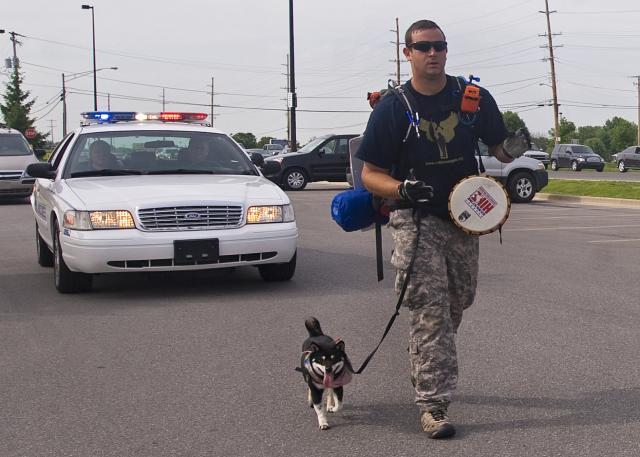
- Troy Yocum at Camp Atterbury, Indiana
- Born: Troy Yocum; June 25, 1979; Louisville, Kentucky, U.S.
- Died: January 4, 2022
- Military career
- Allegiance: United States
- Branch: United States Army
- Rank: Specialist
- Website: www.warriorbattalion.org

Troy Yocum (born June 25, 1979 – January 4, 2022) was a veteran of the Iraq War. He hiked over seven thousand miles across America in 2010–2011 to help bring awareness to issues faced by veterans and their families.

== Drum hike or Hike For Heroes ==
Inspired by his World War II grandfather, who took his own life, and a close military friend, who lost his home after returning from deployment, Yocum decided to make it his personal mission to help struggling veterans.

Yocum began a 16-month journey, dubbed "The Drum Hike" on April 17, 2010, at the Kentucky Derby Festival's Thunder Over Louisville celebration. Yocum bangs his drum when entering towns and cities to bring attention to his cause and carries a bat for mayors and governors to sign. Averaging 20 miles per day, the hike would take him, his wife, and two dogs over more than seven thousand miles and 37 major U.S. cities by the time they make it home.

Yocum's goal is to raise five million dollars and was sponsored by nonprofit Soldiers' Angels.

Due to the extreme physical activity, Yocum has suffered several different medical complications. While in Colorado, he suffered an attack of kidney stones, which required hospitalization and in January 2011, his foot became infected and hence slowed the hike.

In January 2011, Soldier's Angels pulled their support for Yocum due to concern for his health and well-being. He has raised more than $134,000 toward his cause through donations and sponsorships.

Yocum soon picked up sponsorship from Active Heroes and finished the remaining 2,500 miles to the east coast and back home to Louisville, Kentucky. In the final 6 months of the Hike for Heroes, Yocum raised another $1.1 million.

On May 26, 2011, Yocum was welcomed to Washington, D.C. by Congressman John Yarmuth (D-KY) accompanied by firefighters, veterans, and a police escort.

Yocum completed his 7,880 mi. walk on September 3, 2011.

After the Hike ended, Yocum was awarded the 2011 Classy award and founded Active Heroes as a 501(c)(3) charity to continue to help military families in need.

== Personal life ==
A native of Louisville, Kentucky, Yocum met his wife Mareike in Germany. He proposed marriage to her on the 100th mile of the hike, and they were married at mile 256. She walked over 4,000 miles with him during the course of the walk. On January 4, 2022, Yocum died due to complications from COVID-19.

== Military career ==
Yocum graduated in 1997 from Trinity High School and spent two years in the Army National Guard with the 151st Infantry of southern Indiana.

== World record marathon drumming attempt ==
In April 2009, Yocum attempted to beat the world record of 120 hours of marathon drumming set by Russ Prager in March 2009. He was supported by his unit commander and the USO.

To beat the record, Yocum had to play for 120 hours in a row with only a five-minute break every hour and without repeating any songs for four hours and thirty minutes. He attempted to play 250 songs from the 1950s to modern styles. He was forced to give up on the second day of the attempt after temperatures reached more than 100 degrees.
