= List of high school football rivalries less than 100 years old =

High school football rivalries in the United States less than 100 years old include:

== 1920s ==
Series leader	Series rival	Series record	Series began	Notes	References
Osceola High School (Kissimmee, Florida)	St. Cloud High School (St. Cloud, Florida)	63-27-4	1925; 101 years ago	Annual 96th game between the crosstown rivalries. Only 9 miles separate the two cities. The game is Florida’s fifth-oldest football rivalry, has been played since 1925, except for a one year break due to WWII in the state of Florida.	
Mansfield High School (Mansfield, Massachusetts)	Foxborough High School (Foxborough, Massachusetts)	44-32-3	1925; 101 years ago	Neighboring towns in southeastern Massachusetts with deep ties played each other for the first time in 1925, but did not play on Thanksgiving until 1947. The game was played four times in Schaefer Stadium, home of the New England Patriots, in the 1970s before returning to home schools' fields.	
Northampton High School (Northampton, Pennsylvania)	Catasauqua High School (Catasauqua, Pennsylvania)	54-31-4	1925; 101 years ago	These two high schools from neighboring towns first played each other in 1925. Beginning in 1927, the game was agreed to be played on Thanksgiving Day from the onset of the season.	
Theodore Roosevelt High School (Los Angeles)	Garfield High School (Los Angeles County, California)	40-29-6	1926; 100 years ago	This game, officially called the "East Los Angeles Classic" since 1972, matches two high schools from East Los Angeles, California. Played at East Los Angeles College, it regularly draws attendance in excess of 20,000.	
San Pedro High School (San Pedro, CA)	Phineas Banning High School (Wilmington, CA)	42-41-3	1926; 100 years ago	The Battle for the Los Angeles Harbor. Serious football. An intense rivalry game played by some of the best football players in the City of Los Angeles.	
Burlingame High School (Burlingame, California)	San Mateo High School (San Mateo, California)	50-32-4	1927; 99 years ago	The rivalry, known as "The Little Big Game", started in 1927 and is one of the oldest in northern California. It was inspired by the Stanford-Cal game, which is commonly called "The Big Game." Burlingame won "The Paw" for the ninth time in the last 10 seasons, beating San Mateo 48-0. Burlingame leads the all-time series 50-32-4.	
Chelmsford High School (Chelmsford, Massachusetts)	Billerica Memorial High School (Billerica, Massachusetts)	60-28-5	1927; 99 years ago	Annual Thanksgiving football game. One of the oldest in the Greater Lowell suburban area of Massachusetts. The "Police Chiefs Trophy" is awarded to the winning team each year. The 2019 game, the final one played at the Marshall middle school before moving to the high school next fall, was won by Billerica 21-19 on a 26 yard field goal with two seconds left.	
Maryville High School (Maryville, Tennessee)	Alcoa High School (Alcoa, Tennessee)	65–25–3	1927; 99 years ago	Arguably the biggest football game in the state of Tennessee, known as the “Battle of Pistol Creek” between the Rebels and the Tornadoes. Sometimes also known as "Clash of the Champions", Alcoa (3A) and Maryville (6A) lead the state in most State Championships won (Alcoa 20, Maryville 17). Alcoa coach Gary Rankin (2006–present) has won 13 state championships at Alcoa and 17 overall, compiling over 460 wins at three schools since 1981.	
Bristol Warriors (Bristol, Pennsylvania)	Morrisville Bulldogs (Morrisville, Pennsylvania)	44-35-4	1928; 98 years ago	The Thanksgiving gridiron rivalry between the two schools goes back to 1928 when the Warriors notched the first of nine straight wins over the Bulldogs. Bristol has won the last 11 battles with Morrisville dating back to 2000 including last year's 40-0 shutout.	
Park Panthers (Racine, Wisconsin)	Horlick Rebels (Racine, Wisconsin)	52-30-6	1928; 98 years ago	Cross town rivals since the founding of both schools by splitting Racine High School in 1928/1929. It is said to be one of the oldest prep football rivalries in Wisconsin.	
Palmyra High School (Palmyra, New Jersey)	Riverside High School (Riverside Township, New Jersey)	59-23-3	1928; 98 years ago	The towns separated by less than five miles, Riverside was a sending district to Palmyra prior to 1928. Palmyra has dominated the series.	

== 1930s ==
Series leader	Series rival	Series record	Series began	Notes	References
Clear Lake High School (Lakeport, California)	Kelseyville High School (Kelseyville, California)	37-33-7	1930; 96 years ago	Oldest, most contentious rivalry in Lake County, California. Most recently the game has been deemed the "Bass Bowl" as the schools are near Clear Lake. A carved wooden trophy of a big mouth bass goes to the winning school for the year.	
Glendale High School (Glendale, California)	Herbert Hoover High School (Glendale, California)	51-36-2	1930; 96 years ago	Began after students protested the ban on the two high schools versing against each other that the Glendale Unified School District placed shortly after Herbert Hoover High School was built. It is the only high school rivalry in Glendale, California. Each year it takes place at Glendale High's Moyse Field.	
Pennridge High School (Perkasie, Pennsylvania)	Quakertown High School (Quakertown, Pennsylvania)	58-28-5	1930; 96 years ago	Alternating between towns on Thanksgiving day each yeah, the 84th annual game between the crosstown rivalries pits two towns only 6 miles apart against one another. It is one of the oldest high school football rivalry games in the State of Pennsylvania.	
Taunton High School (Taunton, Massachusetts)	Coyle and Cassidy High School (Taunton, Massachusetts)	48-36-2	1931; 95 years ago	"The Game" between Taunton High School and Coyle and Cassidy High School dates back to 1931. The first two games in the rivalry were contested between Taunton High School and St. Mary's High School, a predecessor institution to Coyle and Cassidy. The rivalry continued when the male students at St. Mary's High School were moved to the new, all-boys Monsignor Coyle High School in 1933. "The Game" was first contested on Thanksgiving Day in 1953. In 1971, with the merger of the all-boys Monsignor Coyle High School and the all-girls Bishop Cassidy High School forming the co-educational Coyle and Cassidy High School, the rivalry game took on its current form. Thanksgiving play was suspended from 1982 through 1996, though the two schools continued to face each other on another date during the season. "The Game" was reinstated as a Thanksgiving Day tradition beginning in 1997.	
Hackensack High School (Hackensack, New Jersey)	Teaneck High School (Teaneck, New Jersey)	68-23	1931; 95 years ago	The rivals have played annually every Thanksgiving morning since 1931 with the exception of 2020. It is one of only two remaining Thanksgiving games in Bergen County, NJ. The other game being Dumont vs. Tenafly.	
Barstow High School (Barstow, California)	Victor Valley High School (Victorville, California)	45-41-4	1932; 94 years ago	Dubbed the "Axe Game," the two high schools in the High Desert of Southern California, play for bragging rights and, until the 1950s, an old fireman's axe. In the 1950s, the fireman's axe was stolen from Barstow High School's trophy case and replaced with the current axe.	
Trion High School (Trion, Georgia)	Gordon Lee High School (Chickamauga, Georgia)	56-21	1933; 93 years ago	This game is the oldest continuous series in the state of Georgia. The two teams met for the very first time in 1933, skipping the 1943 and 1945 seasons during World War II, and have been playing annually since 1946 where Trion holds a significant edge in the series.	
Hatboro-Horsham High School (Hatboro, Pennsylvania)	Upper Moreland High School (Willow Grove, Pennsylvania)	49-20-5	1935; 91 years ago	With the first three shows in this rivalry ending in a win, a loss, and a tie, the Golden Bears and the Hatters have competed on every Thanksgiving ever since the depressed 1930s. Though now in different divisions, the two teams continue to light up the annual game.	
Murphy High School (Mobile, Alabama)	McGill-Toolen Catholic High School (Mobile, Alabama)	46-30-1	1935; 91 years ago	One of the oldest rivalries in the state of Alabama, the McGill–Murphy game is traditionally played the Thursday or Friday before Halloween. Though bragging rights and school pride are a major part of the game, both schools compete for the right to "paint the cannon". This is a long-running tradition in which the students of the winning school paint the Cannon in Mobile with the colors of the victorious school (orange for a McGill victory, blue for a Murphy victory). One of the most heated matches in the area, the rivalry has been dubbed the Cannon Bowl by residents.	
Fort Hill High School (Cumberland, Maryland)	Allegany High School (Cumberland, Maryland)	44-29-4	1936; 90 years ago	Game serves as Homecoming for both schools, including the presentation of each school's Homecoming Queen and court at halftime. It is played at Greenway Avenue Stadium in Cumberland, which serves as the home field for both schools. Locally known simply as "Homecoming", the game routinely draws 10 to 14 thousand fans, in a town of about 20,000 people. The winner keeps "The Black Kettle", a traveling trophy with the scores from all the previous games engraved. Subject of a one-hour NFL Films documentary on Versus.	
Warren Central High School (Indianapolis, Indiana)	Ben Davis High School (Indianapolis, Indiana)	55-34-3	1937; 89 years ago	"The Circle City Showdown ". This annual rivalry game takes place halfway through the season. The Warren Central Warriors and the Ben Davis Giants play for community and bragging rights. Warren Central leads the overall series 55-34-3.	

== 1940s ==
Series leader	Series rival	Series record	Series began	Notes	References
Soddy Daisy High School (Soddy-Daisy, Tennessee)	Red Bank High School (Chattanooga, Tennessee)	42–39–1	1940; 86 years ago	In 1940, Red Bank and Soddy-Daisy football teams met for the first time ever and the Red Bank Lions earned their first rivalry win over the Trojans. Despite the matchup’s very early beginnings, the rivalry became ever-present in the mid-80s when Soddy-Daisy High School moved to its current location on Sequoyah Access Road and has picked up steam ever since.	
Abraham Lincoln High School (San Jose, California)	San Jose High Academy	38-24-0	1943; 83 years ago	"Big Bone Game," it is the only Thanksgiving-Day high school football rivalry game that is held west of Missouri. Lincoln once passed up a postseason playoff bid so that it could play the Big Bone Game on Thanksgiving. The trophy that is passed to the winner is a cow femur that was found by a Lincoln student in his uncle's butcher shop. The rivalry has been recognized as one of the most unusual and intense in the country by Sporting News and StudentSports.com.	
Peabody Veterans Memorial High School (Peabody, Massachusetts)	Saugus High School (Saugus, Massachusetts)	47-28	1944; 82 years ago	Annual Thanksgiving football game. Rivalry has been played since 1944, with the exception of 2007, 2008, and 2020. Peabody won 17 straight between 1989 and 2005, and has won 8 straight since 2014.	
Jenks High School (Jenks, Oklahoma)	Union High School (Tulsa, Oklahoma)	32-19	1946; 80 years ago	Known as the "Backyard Bowl," the rivalry has received coverage by Sporting News and is the subject of a Versus documentary produced by NFL Films. The annual game is played at the University of Tulsa and has drawn crowds of over 40,000. The annual rivalry game was presented on the Great American Rivalry Series internet broadcast in 2007. One of these two teams won Oklahoma's Class 6A (large school) title every year from 1996 to 2016.	
John Burroughs High School (Burbank, California)	Burbank High School (Burbank, California)	41-22	1949; 77 years ago	The annual "Big Game" between cross town rivals the Burbank High School Bulldogs and the John Burroughs High School Indians is the last regular season game, and last league game, for both schools. Its takes place at Memorial Field located on the campus of John Burroughs High School and draws an average attendance close to 10,000 people.	

== 1950s ==
Series leader	Series rival	Series record	Series began	Notes	References
Friendship Capitol High School (Baton Rouge, Louisiana)	McKinley High School (Baton Rouge, Louisiana)	36–32–3	1950; 76 years ago	MHS, the oldest high school for African Americans in Louisiana, and FCHS, which was later carved out of MHS' attendance zone, compete annually in the "Downtown Showdown." Originally billed as the city's black title, MHS led 15–4–2 from 1950–69 but then went 5–26–1 from 1970–99 as it integrated with a G/T program. FCHS has similarly struggled since downsizing into a charter school; MHS went 12–6 from 2000–18.	
Notre Dame High School (West Haven, Connecticut)	Hamden High School (Hamden, Connecticut)	37-22-2	1951; 75 years ago	Notre Dame High School maintains a long-standing football rivalry with Hamden High School. Since 1951, Notre Dame's Green Knights and Hamden's Green Dragons have met in the annual "Green Bowl" game on Thanksgiving Day.	
St. Edward High School (Lakewood, Ohio)	Saint Ignatius High School (Cleveland, Ohio)	27-21-1	1952; 74 years ago	Commonly referred to as 'Eds-Ignatius game' or the 'Holy War', these two all-boys schools are only 6 miles apart, but have won 12 OHSAA Division I state football titles in the last 25 years, 18 football final four appearances (i.e., Greater Cleveland champions) and 69 Division I titles in various sports. The rivalry stems from the fact that the vast majority of students come from Cleveland's west side Catholic grade schools and as such, players playing against one another formerly played together in grade school. The rivalry is noted as being one of top ten high school football rivalries in the country by Rivals.com.	
Martha's Vineyard High School (Martha's Vineyard, Massachusetts)	Nantucket High School (Nantucket, Massachusetts)	35–28–3	1953; 73 years ago	Dubbed "The Island Cup", the winner of the annual game receives the "Island Cup Trophy", which sits on display in the respective winners' school for the duration of the year. The schools alternate playing the game at each others respective home fields each year. The visiting team travels via ferry or plane to the home-team island (Martha's Vineyard or Nantucket), as do all the parents and fans attending the game.	
Ogden High School (Ogden, Utah)	Ben Lomond High School (Ogden, Utah)	47-19	1953; 73 years ago	It is a rivalry between the two high schools in the Ogden City School District in Ogden. Called the "Iron Horse", the winner of the two schools gets the trophy of the same name. The trophy has two trains facing each other on top, one train for each school. Starting in 2015, the game has been held at Stewart Stadium at Weber State University because of how big of a rivalry it is.	
John Muir High School (Pasadena, California)	Pasadena High School (Pasadena, California)	46-20-2	1954; 72 years ago	The Turkey Tussle is a homecoming game for both Pasadena Unified School District high schools, held annually at the Rose Bowl in Pasadena during the final week of the high school football season. Both schools play for the Victory Bell. It draws hundreds of alumni from both schools along with current students, school principals from both schools and City of Pasadena and Pasadena Unified School District elected officials.	
Redwood High School (Visalia, California)	Mount Whitney High School (Visalia, California)	31-24-0	1955; 71 years ago	The Cowhide game is fierce cross-town rivalry game held annually between Redwood and Mt. Whitney High. Every year, Redwood Rangers and Mt. Whitney Pioneers fight it out on the field for the Cowhide trophy, an actual cowhide. It has been a tradition between the two schools since 1955, and is the biggest sporting event in Visalia. People who never attended either of the rival high schools show up due to the intensity of the game and environment. The matchup is well covered in local newspapers as well as radio and television programs. It regularly draws a crowd of 9,000+.	
Trinity High School (Louisville, Kentucky)	St. Xavier High School (Louisville, Kentucky)	41-37-2	1956; 70 years ago	Dubbed the "St. X/Trinity Game", it is one of the five biggest high school rivalries in the nation, according to USA Today and has been labeled the "best prep school rivalry in the country" by Sporting News. Played at Cardinal Stadium, it has drawn more than 35,000 spectators in each of the last ten matchups.	
Las Vegas High School (Las Vegas, Nevada)	Rancho High School (North Las Vegas, Nevada)	28-25-1	1957; 69 years ago	The oldest high school football rivalry in Nevada, The Bone Game, is the annual contest between the two oldest schools in Las Vegas. The winner of the game takes possession of "Sir Herkimer's Bone," a large cow bone that is preserved in bronze, until the following year.	
Naples High School (Naples, Florida)	Immokalee High School (Immokalee, Florida)	24-22	1959; 67 years ago	The series dates back to 1959, when Naples and Immokalee were the only high school football teams in Collier County. Lely, the third high school in the county and second in Naples, didn’t open until 1974.	
St. Francis de Sales High School (Toledo, Ohio)	Central Catholic High School (Toledo, Ohio)	33–29–1	1959; 67 years ago	The Irish Knight is awarded to the winner of the Central Catholic High School and St. Francis de Sales High School football game. The winning school receives and hosts the Irish Knight in their school, along with bragging rights.	

== 1960s ==
Series leader	Series rival	Series record	Series began	Notes	References
Permian High School (Odessa, Texas)	Lee High School (Midland, Texas)	29-19-1	1961; 65 years ago	The Permian-Lee rivalry is featured in the H. G. Bissinger book Friday Night Lights and in the movie and the TV series, and featured in the documentary, Friday Nights in America. The 2004 matchup between the schools is believed to be the first live telecast of a regular-season high school football game in Texas. The station pre-empted the National League baseball playoff game scheduled to be broadcast in order to carry the rivalry game.	
Collegiate School (Richmond, Virginia)	St. Christopher's School (Richmond, Virginia)	42-21-1	1962; 64 years ago	Richmond's most heated prep school rivalry.	
Boston College High School (Boston, Massachusetts)	Catholic Memorial School (Boston, Massachusetts)	37-17-1	1962; 64 years ago		
Warner Robins High School (Warner Robins, Georgia)	Northside High School (Warner Robins, Georgia)	33-20-0	1964; 62 years ago	One of the Peach State's most heated rivalry games, this matchup features two programs with great histories. The interest in the rivalry is supplemented by the city's proximity to Robins Air Force Base: Georgia's Largest Employer. The series is currently known as "The Showdown at the MAC." The rivalry traditionally splits the town of Warner Robins in half, and they often play host to 20,000+ spectators in the stands and surrounding grounds of McConnell-Talbert Stadium. Between 1967 and 2005, WRHS and NHS were in the same region. Only five times did both schools not finish in the top three of the region.	
Clinton-Massie High School (Clarksville, Ohio)	Blanchester High School (Blanchester, Ohio)	25-18-0	1964; 62 years ago	Dubbed the Cider Keg Game, this game is played for a red, white, and blue keg. It is the oldest rivalry in Ohio involving a traveling trophy.	
Rock Hill High School (Rock Hill, South Carolina)	Northwestern High School (Rock Hill, South Carolina)	22-21-0	1964; 62 years ago	One of the Carolinas' biggest high school rivalries and ranked by a top high school football rivalries by Sporting News and StudentSports.com. The annual game was the first in the area to have its video broadcast live over the internet. The audio of the game has also been broadcast over the internet by the Great American Rivalry Series.	
Decatur High School (Decatur, Alabama)	Austin High School (Decatur, Alabama)	30-14-0	1965; 61 years ago	This rivalry is considered the most heated in North Alabama high school football. The game is held in Ogle Stadium on the campus of Decatur High and consistently draws crowds of 12,000 to 13,000 each year.	
Cathedral Catholic High School (formerly University of San Diego High School) (San Diego, California)	St. Augustine High School (San Diego, California)	32-17-0	1966; 60 years ago	Since 1966, the University of San Diego High School (now Cathedral Catholic) Dons and the St. Augustine Saints have assembled at least once a year to compete in the highly anticipated "Holy Bowl," formerly known as the Charity Bowl. Holy Bowl games are hosted at Cathedral Catholic High School, when they are the home team, and San Diego Mesa College, when St. Augustine is the home team, in order to accommodate the large crowd.	
Apple Valley High School (Apple Valley, California)	Victor Valley High School (Victorville, California)	32-15-0	1968; 58 years ago	Known as "The Bell Game," the rivalry is the biggest in the High Desert (California) and has been featured on the Great American Rivalry Series.	
Valdosta High School (Valdosta, Georgia)	Lowndes High School (Valdosta, Georgia)	33-12-0	1968; 58 years ago	Known as "The Winnersville Classic," the rivalry game currently attracts around 14,000 spectators.	
Coconino High School	Flagstaff High School	30-26	1969; 57 years ago	The annual meeting between the Coconino Panthers and the Flagstaff Eagles is the crosstown matchup between the two public high schools in Flagstaff, Arizona. The game is played at the Walkup Skydome at Northern Arizona University; its original seating in 1977 was 15,000, with the game regularly meeting capacity. Since the rivalry began in 1969, the teams have combined for thirteen division titles, 39 playoff berths, and six state championships.	

== 1970s ==
Series leader	Series rival	Series record	Series began	Notes	References
Nelsonville-York High School (Nelsonville, Ohio)	Trimble High School (Glouster, Ohio)	34-20-2	1970; 56 years ago	One of Southeast Ohio's more fierce rivalry, the Tomcats and Buckeyes meet week one of every year. The two schools are known for their proud tradition, and are regional title contenders year in and year out.	
Napa High School (Napa, California)	Vintage High School (Napa, California)	29-20-2	1971; 55 years ago	Known as "The Big Game," pitting cross town rivals against each other at Napa's Memorial Stadium. In 2008, an ESPN article ranked the venue where the game is played #4 in a list of best high school stadiums.	
Robinson Secondary School (Fairfax, Virginia)	Lake Braddock Secondary School (Burke, Virginia)	21-20-0	1971; 55 years ago	Often considered one of the most intense high school rivalry in Northern Virginia.	
Brookstone High School (Columbus, Georgia)	Pacelli High School (Columbus, Georgia)	26-14-1	1972; 54 years ago	This rivalry, known as the "Battle for the Jug," is played between the largest private schools in Columbus, Georgia. The winner receives the "Broocelli Jug", a blue and red milk jug with the scores of the last 10 games painted on it, as a trophy.	
Sacred Heart Griffin (Springfield, Illinois)	Glenwood High School (Chatham, Illinois)	42-9	1973; 53 years ago	Began in 1973 when the teams first met, Sacred Heart-Griffin won that game. Sacred Heart-Griffin is 7-0 in the playoffs, 11-2 in non-conference play, and 26-7 in conference play.	
Manatee High School (Bradenton, Florida)	Southeast High School (Bradenton, Florida)	16-14-0	1974; 52 years ago	The Manatee Hurricanes vs. the Southeast Seminoles is a crosstown rivalry that usually declares county supremacy. The game is part of the "Great American Rivalry Series" sponsored by the Air Force. The two teams have clashed 30 times, with Manatee holding a slight edge (16-14). The game is one that the whole community looks forward to in September. The game attracts an audience of about 6,000.	
Gainesville High School (Gainesville, Georgia)	North Hall High School (Gainesville, Georgia)	18-4-0	1974; 52 years ago	"North Hall-GHS" usually takes place in early to mid September and draws an annual crowd of over 10,000 and received national attention on September 14, 1990 when the game was broadcast live nationwide by the ESPN network. The game played was a 19-13 thriller win for North Hall, their 2nd in the series. The winner of this game has been crowned GHSA Region 7-AAA Champion each season since 2002 with the exception of 2006 when the Elephants of Gainesville pulled out a dramatic 29-28 win over the Trojans of North Hall but suffered down the stretch thus allowing the Trojans to take sole possession of first place.	
North Hunterdon High School (Clinton Township, New Jersey)	Voorhees High School (Glen Gardner, New Jersey)	23-12-1	1976; 50 years ago	The annual Milk Can Game is their last game of the season. After the conclusion of the game, a gold colored milk can is awarded to the winner. This school receives bragging rights and ownership of the can until the next year's game.	
The Westminster Schools (Atlanta, Georgia)	The Lovett School (Atlanta, Georgia)	14-8-0	1976; 50 years ago	Dubbed "The Battle of Buckhead", often regarded as one of the biggest high school football games in the Atlanta area. Sportsmanship has been known to be poor during these games, as the game was discontinued from 1981 to 1994.	

== 1980s ==
Series leader	Series rival	Series record	Series began	Notes	References
Glencoe High School (Hillsboro, Oregon)	Hillsboro High School (Hillsboro, Oregon)	21-6-0	1980; 46 years ago	Cross-town rivals schools with winner getting bragging rights to Hare Field, the stadium is shared between the two schools and the "home" school rotates every year. The annual rivalry game was presented on the Great American Rivalry Series internet broadcast in 2007.	
Mullen High School (Denver, CO)	Cherry Creek High School (Greenwood Village, CO)	22-18-0	1983; 43 years ago	Cherry Creek and Mullen both reside in the Denver-Metro Area and are super powers with a Combined 22 state championships. The series was tied going into 2008 before Mullen broke the tie in the state title game. To even add more fuel to the fire, the former Mullen coach and CU great Dave Logan soon became the head coach of Cherry Creek to start the 2012 season. This rivalry is noted to be one of the most competitive and meaningful rivalry in Colorado. With the Emergence of Valor High School it could become more of a three team battle for the 5A state title, rather the past couple of years where it has been Mullen or Creek.	
Tarpon Springs High School (Tarpon Springs, Florida)	East Lake High School (Tarpon Springs, Florida)	14-8-0	1987; 39 years ago	The Tarpon Springs Spongers were the dominant force in the Tarpon area, making it to the state championship game in 1986. East Lake High School opened the following year, only 15 miles away from the Tarpon campus, and thus driving many would-be Tarpon players to East Lake. Because many of the players and students went to middle school together, animosity was formed from both sides, with the game being the most attended of the year for both schools. Attendance usually ranges from 4,000 to 10,000, almost certain to be a sellout.	

== 1990s ==
Series leader	Series rival	Series record	Series began	Notes	References
Collierville High School (Collierville, Tennessee)	Houston High School (Germantown, Tennessee)	18-15	1991; 35 years ago	Collierville High School and Houston High school are major rivals in both baseball and football. The rivalry began in 1991 when the two met for the first time in a 17-3 Collierville victory. The schools are about 9 miles apart from each other. In 2024, they introduced a new trophy to the football rivalry, the Mayor's Trophy.	
Traverse City West Senior High School (Traverse City, Michigan)	Traverse City Central High School (Traverse City, Michigan)	15-14	1997; 29 years ago	Renowned for being the best high school rivalry in Michigan, this rivalry began in 1998 when Traverse City Senior High split to form Traverse City Central and Traverse City West Senior High Schools, also known as the Battle for Traverse City, and, since 2012, has been known as the Traverse City Patriot Game	

== 2000s ==
Series leader	Series rival	Series record	Series began	Notes	References
Zeeland West High School (Zeeland, Michigan)	Zeeland East High School (Zeeland, Michigan)	17-7	2005; 21 years ago	The rivalry began in 2005 when Zeeland High School split to form Zeeland East and Zeeland West high schools. The rivalry is known as the "Bird Bowl" as the schools' teams are known as the Zeeland East Chix and Zeeland West Dux.	
Prior Lake High School (Prior Lake, Minnesota)	Shakopee High School (Shakopee, Minnesota)	12-5	2004; 22 years ago	Selected as part of the Great American Rivalry Series in 2023.	

== 2010s ==
Series leader	Series rival	Series record	Series began	Notes	References
Sacred Heart Griffin (Springfield, Illinois)	Rochester High School (Rochester, Illinois)	11-9	2010; 16 years ago	Began in 2010 when Rochester joined the Central State Eight conference. This game was formerly known as the Leonard Bowl as the coach of Rochester, Derek Leonard is the son of the Sacred Heart-Griffin coach, Ken Leonard. Ken retired in 2023.	

== See also ==
- List of high school football rivalries more than 100 years old
