= Lexington Christian Academy (Kentucky) =

Location
- 450 W. Reynolds Road; Lexington, Fayette County, Kentucky; United States
- 37.9924°N 84.5371°W

Information
- School type: Private
- Motto: Pursuing a World-Class, Christ-Centered Education
- Religious affiliation: Christian
- Grades: Preschool - 12
- Campus size: 80 acres (32 ha)
- Accreditation: AdvancED
- Website: www.lexingtonchristian.org

Lexington Christian Academy is a private, non-denominational Christian school in Lexington, Kentucky, accredited by the AdvancED. The school serves preschool through 12th grade. Total enrollment is around 1,500, with about 200 junior high school, and 460 high school students. As a requirement for teaching at LCA, all teachers must profess Jesus Christ as their personal savior.

== History ==
Lexington Christian Academy was founded in 1989 with the merger of The Lexington Christian School, founded as an elementary school in 1975 by Gardenside Christian Church, and The Academy, founded in 1983 offering preschool and kindergarten. At the time of the merger, the newly combined school, known then as The Lexington Christian Academy, had 565 students, ranging from kindergarten to twelfth grade and spread across three campuses at churches. As enrollment grew, the school expanded to seven campuses, and in the mid-1990s the school purchased 80 acres (32 ha) of land on Reynolds Road to begin consolidating. In 1998 the school formally took its current name, and in January 1999 the high school opened at the Reynolds Road facility, termed the "Rose Campus" after James L. Rose and his wife Judy. In 2003, the junior high school and an elementary and preschool moved to the Rose Campus.

== Athletics ==
As a Kentucky High School Athletic Association member, Lexington Christian Academy competes in cross-country, football, golf, soccer, and volleyball in the fall; basketball, archery and swimming in the winter; and baseball, softball, tennis, and track in the spring.

=== Baseball ===
LCA won the State Championship in 2005. Garrie Krueger was named the tournament MVP.

=== Golf ===
LCA boys team won the 2010, 2011, and 2017 State Championship.
The girls team won the 2018 & 2019 State Championship.

=== Football ===
LCA won the KHSAA 1A State Championship in 2009, and the KHSAA 2A State Championship in 2025.

=== Basketball ===
LCA won the KHSAA girls' basketball state championship in 2007, and won the Kentucky All "A" state tournament in 2007, 2008, and 2009.

== Notable alumni ==
- Cutter Boley, college football quarterback for the Arizona State Sun Devils
