= Steve Crump =

African-American journalist and documentary film producer (1957–2023)

- Born: September 19, 1957; Louisville, Kentucky, U.S.
- Died: August 31, 2023 (aged 65)
- Education: Trinity High School (Louisville); Eastern Kentucky University
- Occupations: Filmmaker; Journalist
- Awards: 4 National Headliner Awards; The Gabriel Award; The Sigma Delta Chi Award

Steven Gerard Crump (September 19, 1957 – August 31, 2023) was an American journalist, documentary film producer, and television reporter for WBTV.

== Biography ==
Steve Crump was born in 1957 in Louisville's Smoketown neighbourhood. He graduated from Trinity High School in the Class of 1975. Raised Catholic, he was a graduate of Louisville's Trinity High School, and Eastern Kentucky University, where he earned a bachelor's degree in Communications.

Crump's career began in 1980, when he got a job as a DJ in Richmond, Kentucky. This job got him noticed by WSAV-TV, an NBC-affiliated television station, where he acquired an internship and was soon placed in front of the camera due to his iconic, booming voice.

Crump also worked for news stations in Orlando, Florida, Lexington, Kentucky, and Detroit, Michigan, as well an independent producer for Charlotte's WTVI, BET, and Charlotte's PBS affiliate before coming to WBTV.

Crump died of colon cancer on August 31, 2023. His funeral was at St. Thomas Aquinas Catholic Church in Charlotte.

== Recognition ==
Crump was best known for his regional Emmy Awards for stories ranging from apartheid in South Africa to civil rights in the American South. He also has earned a number of other awards including four National Headliner Awards, the Gabriel Award, and more than a dozen first-place honors from the National Association of Black Journalists, as well as organizations like Sigma Delta Chi and Sister Cities International. In 2016, Crump was named the "2016 Journalist of the Year" by the NABJ.

== Filmography ==
Title	Year	Role	Ref(s)
Carolina Concerns and the New South Africa	1994	Producer
Carolina Bebop Kings	2002	Producer
Forgotten at the Finish Line	2002	Producer
Lessons from the Lunch Counter	2004	Producer
Before Rosa: The Unsung Contributions of Sarah May Fleming	2005	Producer
Louisville's Own Ali	2007	Director and Producer
Sitting in to Move Forward	2009	Producer
Sojourn of the Strings	2010	Producer
9/4/57	2010	Producer
