= Pennridge–Quakertown Thanksgiving Day Football Classic =

American high school football rivalry played annually on Thanksgiving morning

- Sport: Football
- Type: High School
- Location: Upper Bucks County, Pennsylvania
- Teams: Pennridge Rams; Quakertown Panthers
- First meeting: November 27, 1930
- Latest meeting: November 27, 2025
- Next meeting: November 26, 2026
- Stadiums: Helman Field at Grand View; Heath Stadium (PHS); Alumni Memorial Field (QCHS)

Statistics
- Total meetings: 96
- All-time series: Pennridge leads, 59–32–5
- Largest victory: Pennridge, 56–14 (2003)
- Longest win streak: Pennridge, 7 (1972–78)
- Longest unbeaten streak: Quakertown, 8 (1945-52)
- Current win streak: Pennridge, 1 (2025–present)

The Pennridge–Quakertown Thanksgiving Day Football Classic is an American high school football rivalry played annually on Thanksgiving morning between the Rams of Pennridge High School (Perkasie, PA) and the Panthers of Quakertown Community High School (Quakertown, PA). The rivalry has been played uninterrupted every Thanksgiving morning since the inaugural meeting in Quakertown on November 27, 1930, with the exception of the 1989 game which was postponed two days due to a snowstorm. Quakertown High School hosts the contest on even years while Pennridge High School (formerly Sellersville-Perkasie High School) hosts on odd years. Kickoff time is traditionally set at 10:15 am EST.

== Origins ==
The Thanksgiving Day rivalry officially begins in 1930, but the roots of the rivalry begin ten years earlier. Prior to the formation of the Consolidated Sellerville-Perkasie (Sell-Perk) High School in 1930, the boroughs of Sellersville and Perkasie maintained independent school districts. In 1920, a revitalized Quakertown football program led by Jacob L. Stoneback challenged neighboring Perkasie High School to a football game, beginning what would become an annual affair among the North Penn League schools. Through the 1920s, Perkasie High School maintained a slight edge over Quakertown High, leading the competitive series with 4 wins, 3 losses, and 3 ties. In 1930, the Perkasie and Sellersville school districts were joined to form the Sellersville-Perkasie School District. With the Consolidated School opening its doors for the 1930–1931 school year, the decision was made to showcase the rivalry on Thanksgiving morning in 1930. From this began what would become one of the oldest high school football rivalries in Pennsylvania. In 1953, Sellersville-Perkasie High School would form the core of the present-day Pennridge School District as it absorbed additional school districts from the surrounding boroughs and townships.

The Quakertown-Pennridge Thanksgiving game is one of a diminishing number of high school football games outside of New England or New Jersey to take place on Thanksgiving morning. The few remaining schools in Pennsylvania to play on the holiday are concentrated in the North Penn and Lehigh Valleys.

Perkasie victories	Quakertown victories	Tie games

Year	Location	Winning team	Losing team	Score
1920	Perkasie, PA	Quakertown	Perkasie	13-0
1921	Quakertown, PA	Tie		7-7
1922	Perkasie, PA	Quakertown	Perkasie	12-0
1923	Quakertown, PA	Perkasie	Quakertown	15-14
1924	Perkasie, PA	Perkasie	Quakertown	38-0
1925	Quakertown, PA	Perkasie	Quakertown	26-0
1926	Perkasie, PA	Tie		0-0
1927	Quakertown, PA	Perkasie	Quakertown	18-0
1928	Perkasie, PA	Quakertown	Perkasie	13-7
1929	Quakertown, PA	Tie		12-12
Series: Perkasie leads 4–3–3

== Locations ==
Pennridge

Although the new Consolidated Sellersville-Perkaise High School opened its doors in September 1930, athletic fields had not yet been constructed on school grounds. At that time, the Sellersville-Perkasie football team would alternate home games between the former home fields of the constituent schools, Sellersville Playground (now Druckenmiller Park) and Perkasie Playground (now Kulp Park). Perkasie Playground was chosen as the location of the 1931 Thanksgiving Day game among the two fields. In a joint school board meeting on August 1, 1932, the decision was made to spend $2,000 to develop athletic fields adjacent to the school as a means to stimulate the depressed local economy. On October 13, 1933, the new school football field was dedicated at the first home game of the season against Lansdale (now North Penn) High School. In 1972, the school field was dedicated to the memory of former teacher, coach, and assistant principal Lloyd R. "Poppy" Yoder, memorialized by a plaque donated by the Pennridge Class of 1972. After 81 seasons, including 41 Thanksgiving games at Poppy Yoder Memorial Field, and much debate among the community, the decision was made to move the home of the Rams to the grounds of the present-day high school. On September 26, 2014, the first game was played on the artificial turf of Helman Field against Neshaminy High School. Helman Field was named in honor of longtime teacher, athletic director, and longest-serving head football coach, Wayne Helman. In 2015, phase two of construction of Helman Field saw the expansion of facilities including concessions, a ticket booth, and locker rooms. In 2018, the school district sold the naming rights of the complex to Grand View Health, giving the field its current name, Helman Field at Grand View Health Stadium.

Quakertown

In 1929 Quakertown School District opened a new junior-senior high school on Seventh Street (present-day Quakertown Elementary School) with a football field built on the adjoining property. All of the first four Thanksgiving home games from 1930 to 1936 were played on this field with the exception of the 1934 game which was held at the Quakertown Fair Grounds (known as LuLu Park, on the present-day site of Quakertown Senior High School). With the assistance of $19,000 available from WPA funding, new athletic fields including a football field, baseball diamond, and cinder track were constructed in 1937. On October 9, 1937, the football field was dedicated to much fanfare. In July 1939, the school board named the new gridiron "Alumni Field", recognizing the efforts of the alumni association to raise $3,000 to purchase the perimeter cyclone fence and class plates. Through the years, numerous improvements have been made to Alumni Field including a multi-phase project started in 2004 to install new bleachers, team rooms, concessions, rest rooms, and a press box as well as revamp the sod and mitigate draining issues. In 2014, the school board approved a $1.3 million plan to convert the natural grass to artificial turf and further address the drainage issues that have long plagued the grounds. On September 19, 2014, Quakertown played their first home game on their new artificial turf against Wiliiam Tennent High School.

== Game results ==
Pennridge (Sellersville-Perkasie) victories	Quakertown victories	Tie games

No.	Date	Location	Winning team	Losing team	Score	Series	Ref
1	Thu, Nov 27, 1930	Quakertown, PA	Sellersville-Perkasie	Quakertown	13-0	SPHS 1-0-0	
2	Thu, Nov 26, 1931	Perkasie, PA	Sellersville-Perkasie	Quakertown	27-0	SPHS 2-0-0	
3	Thu, Nov 24, 1932	Quakertown, PA	Sellersville-Perkasie^{†}	Quakertown	25-0	SPHS 3-0-0	
4	Thu, Nov 30, 1933	Perkasie, PA	Sellersville-Perkasie^{†}	Quakertown	18-0	SPHS 4-0-0	
5	Thu, Nov 29, 1934	Quakertown, PA	Quakertown	Sellersville-Perkasie	13-6	SPHS 4-1-0	
6	Thu, Nov 28, 1935	Perkasie, PA	Sellersville-Perkasie	Quakertown	14-6	SPHS 5-1-0	
7	Thu, Nov 26, 1936	Quakertown, PA	Sellersville-Perkasie^{†}	Quakertown	7-0	SPHS 6-1-0	
8	Thu, Nov 25, 1937	Perkasie, PA	Sellersville-Perkasie	Quakertown	6-0	SPHS 7-1-0	
9	Thu, Nov 24, 1938	Quakertown, PA	Sellersville-Perkasie	Quakertown	24-0	SPHS 8-1-0	
10	Thu, Nov 23, 1939	Perkasie, PA	Quakertown	Sellersville-Perkasie	7-0	SPHS 8-2-0	
11	Thu, Nov 28, 1940	Quakertown, PA	Quakertown	Sellersville-Perkasie	7-0	SPHS 8-3-0	
12	Thu, Nov 27, 1941	Perkasie, PA	Sellersville-Perkasie	Quakertown	25-0	SPHS 9-3-0	
13	Thu, Nov 26, 1942	Quakertown, PA	Tie		0-0	SPHS 9-3-1	
14	Thu, Nov 25, 1943	Perkasie, PA	Sellersville-Perkasie	Quakertown	6-0	SPHS 10-3-1	
15	Thu, Nov 23, 1944	Quakertown, PA	Sellersville-Perkasie	Quakertown	14-2	SPHS 11-3-1	
16	Thu, Nov 22, 1945	Perkasie, PA	Tie		0-0	SPHS 11-3-2	
17	Thu, Nov 28, 1946	Quakertown, PA	Tie		0-0	SPHS 11-3-3	
18	Thu, Nov 27, 1947	Perkasie, PA	Quakertown	Sellersville-Perkasie	14-0	SPHS 11-4-3	
19	Thu, Nov 25, 1948	Quakertown, PA	Quakertown	Sellersville-Perkasie	27-0	SPHS 11-5-3	
20	Thu, Nov 24, 1949	Perkasie, PA	Quakertown	Sellersville-Perkasie	35-0	SPHS 11-6-3	
21	Thu, Nov 23, 1950	Quakertown, PA	Quakertown	Sellersville-Perkasie	20-0	SPHS 11-7-3	
22	Thu, Nov 22, 1951	Perkasie, PA	Quakertown	Sellersville-Perkasie	27-7	SPHS 11-8-3	
23	Thu, Nov 27, 1952	Quakertown, PA	Tie		7-7	SPHS 11-8-4	
24	Thu, Nov 26, 1953	Perkasie, PA	Pennridge^{†}	Quakertown	13-7	PHS 12-8-4	
25	Thu, Nov 25, 1954	Quakertown, PA	Quakertown^{†}	Pennridge	14-7	PHS 12-9-4	
26	Thu, Nov 24, 1955	Perkasie, PA	Pennridge^{†}	Quakertown	46-19	PHS 13-9-4	
27	Thu, Nov 22, 1956	Quakertown, PA	Quakertown^{†}	Pennridge	13-0	PHS 13-10-4	
28	Thu, Nov 28, 1957	Perkasie, PA	Pennridge^{†}	Quakertown	30-0	PHS 14-10-4	
29	Thu, Nov 27, 1958	Quakertown, PA	Pennridge	Quakertown	40-12	PHS 15-10-4	
30	Thu, Nov 26, 1959	Perkasie, PA	Quakertown	Pennridge	13-12	PHS 15-11-4	
31	Thu, Nov 24, 1960	Quakertown, PA	Quakertown	Pennridge	27-19	PHS 15-12-4	
32	Thu, Nov 23, 1961	Perkasie, PA	Pennridge^{‡}	Quakertown	7-6	PHS 16-12-4	
33	Thu, Nov 22, 1962	Quakertown, PA	Pennridge^{†}	Quakertown	25-6	PHS 17-12-4	
34	Thu, Nov 28, 1963	Perkasie, PA	Pennridge	Quakertown	13-7	PHS 18-12-4	
35	Thu, Nov 26, 1964	Quakertown, PA	Pennridge^{†}	Quakertown	20-0	PHS 19-12-4	
36	Thu, Nov 25, 1965	Perkasie, PA	Quakertown^{†}	Pennridge	13-6	PHS 19-13-4	
37	Thu, Nov 24, 1966	Quakertown, PA	Pennridge	Quakertown	19-14	PHS 20-13-4	
38	Thu, Nov 23, 1967	Perkasie, PA	Pennridge	Quakertown	14-2	PHS 21-13-4	
39	Thu, Nov 28, 1968	Quakertown, PA	Quakertown	Pennridge	14-7	PHS 21-14-4	
40	Thu, Nov 27, 1969	Perkasie, PA	Pennridge	Quakertown	13-6	PHS 22-14-4	
41	Thu, Nov 26, 1970	Quakertown, PA	Quakertown^{‡}	Pennridge	66-28	PHS 22-15-4	
42	Thu, Nov 25, 1971	Perkasie, PA	Quakertown	Pennridge	8-6	PHS 22-16-4	
43	Thu, Nov 23, 1972	Quakertown, PA	Pennridge	Quakertown	13-6	PHS 23-16-4	
44	Thu, Nov 22, 1973	Perkasie, PA	Pennridge	Quakertown	28-0	PHS 24-16-4	
45	Thu, Nov 28, 1974	Quakertown, PA	Pennridge	Quakertown	14-12	PHS 25-16-4	
46	Thu, Nov 27, 1975	Perkasie, PA	Pennridge	Quakertown	6-0	PHS 26-16-4	
47	Thu, Nov 25, 1976	Quakertown, PA	Pennridge	Quakertown	20-6	PHS 27-16-4	
48	Thu, Nov 24, 1977	Perkasie, PA	Pennridge^{‡}	Quakertown	34-6	PHS 28-16-4	
49	Thu, Nov 23, 1978	Quakertown, PA	Pennridge	Quakertown	26-12	PHS 29-16-4	
50	Thu, Nov 22, 1979	Perkasie, PA	Quakertown	Pennridge	3-0	PHS 29-17-4	
51	Thu, Nov 27, 1980	Quakertown, PA	Pennridge	Quakertown	7-6	PHS 30-17-4	
52	Thu, Nov 26, 1981	Perkasie, PA	Pennridge	Quakertown	25-0	PHS 31-17-4	
53	Thu, Nov 25, 1982	Quakertown, PA	Pennridge	Quakertown	20-3	PHS 32-17-4	
54	Thu, Nov 24, 1983	Perkasie, PA	Pennridge	Quakertown	20-0	PHS 33-17-4	
55	Thu, Nov 22, 1984	Quakertown, PA	Quakertown	Pennridge	18-13	PHS 33-18-4	
56	Thu, Nov 28, 1985	Perkasie, PA	Pennridge	Quakertown	6-0	PHS 34-18-4	
57	Thu, Nov 27, 1986	Quakertown, PA	Pennridge	Quakertown^{‡}	21-6	PHS 35-18-4	
58	Thu, Nov 26, 1987	Perkasie, PA	Pennridge	Quakertown	15-10	PHS 36-18-4	
59	Thu, Nov 24, 1988	Quakertown, PA	Quakertown	Pennridge	20-6	PHS 36-19-4	
60	Sat, Nov 25, 1989	Perkasie, PA	Tie		0-0	PHS 36-19-5	
61	Thu, Nov 22, 1990	Quakertown, PA	Quakertown	Pennridge	29-16	PHS 36-20-5	
62	Thu, Nov 28, 1991	Perkasie, PA	Quakertown	Pennridge	15-13	PHS 36-21-5	
63	Thu, Nov 26, 1992	Quakertown, PA	Pennridge	Quakertown	13-0	PHS 37-21-5	
64	Thu, Nov 25, 1993	Perkasie, PA	Pennridge	Quakertown	27-13	PHS 38-21-5	
65	Thu, Nov 24, 1994	Quakertown, PA	Quakertown	Pennridge	7-0	PHS 38-22-5	
66	Thu, Nov 23, 1995	Perkasie, PA	Pennridge	Quakertown	7-0^{1OT}	PHS 39-22-5	
67	Thu, Nov 28, 1996	Quakertown, PA	Quakertown	Pennridge	34-6	PHS 39-23-5	
68	Thu, Nov 27, 1997	Perkasie, PA	Pennridge	Quakertown	27-14	PHS 40-23-5	
69	Thu, Nov 26, 1998	Quakertown, PA	Pennridge^{†}	Quakertown	27-2	PHS 41-23-5	
70	Thu, Nov 25, 1999	Perkasie, PA	Pennridge^{‡}	Quakertown	30-26	PHS 42-23-5	
71	Thu, Nov 23, 2000	Quakertown, PA	Quakertown	Pennridge^{‡}	52-45^{6OT}	PHS 42-24-5	
72	Thu, Nov 22, 2001	Perkasie, PA	Pennridge^{‡}	Quakertown^{†}	33-12	PHS 43-24-5	
73	Thu, Nov 28, 2002	Quakertown, PA	Pennridge	Quakertown^{†}	38-17	PHS 44-24-5	
74	Thu, Nov 27, 2003	Perkasie, PA	Pennridge^{†}	Quakertown^{†}	56-14	PHS 45-24-5	
75	Thu, Nov 25, 2004	Quakertown, PA	Quakertown	Pennridge^{‡}	21-7	PHS 45-25-5	
76	Thu, Nov 24, 2005	Perkasie, PA	Pennridge	Quakertown	28-7	PHS 46-25-5	
77	Thu, Nov 23, 2006	Quakertown, PA	Pennridge	Quakertown	14-10	PHS 47-25-5	
78	Thu, Nov 22, 2007	Perkasie, PA	Pennridge	Quakertown	36-0	PHS 48-25-5	
79	Thu, Nov 27, 2008	Quakertown, PA	Quakertown	Pennridge	34-29	PHS 48-26-5	
80	Thu, Nov 26, 2009	Perkasie, PA	Pennridge	Quakertown	31-28	PHS 49-26-5	
81	Thu, Nov 25, 2010	Quakertown, PA	Pennridge	Quakertown	22-12	PHS 50-26-5	
82	Thu, Nov 24, 2011	Perkasie, PA	Pennridge	Quakertown	21-20	PHS 51-26-5	
83	Thu, Nov 22, 2012	Quakertown, PA	Pennridge^{†}	Quakertown	28-13	PHS 52-26-5	
84	Thu, Nov 28, 2013	Perkasie, PA	Pennridge	Quakertown	27-7	PHS 53-26-5	
85	Thu, Nov 27, 2014	Quakertown, PA	Quakertown^{†}	Pennridge	8-7	PHS 53-27-5	
86	Thu, Nov 26, 2015	Perkasie, PA	Quakertown	Pennridge	28-21	PHS 53-28-5	
87	Thu, Nov 24, 2016	Quakertown, PA	Pennridge	Quakertown	55-27	PHS 54-28-5	
88	Thu, Nov 23, 2017	Perkasie, PA	Pennridge	Quakertown	34-6	PHS 55-28-5	
89	Thu, Nov 22, 2018	Quakertown, PA	Pennridge	Quakertown	37-6	PHS 56-28-5	
90	Thu, Nov 28, 2019	Perkasie, PA	Pennridge	Quakertown	19-13	PHS 57-28-5	
91	Thu, Nov 26, 2020	Quakertown, PA	Pennridge^{†}	Quakertown	21-14	PHS 58-28-5	
92	Thu, Nov 25, 2021	Perkasie, PA	Quakertown^{†}	Pennridge	21-0	PHS 58-29-5	
93	Thu, Nov 24, 2022	Quakertown, PA	Quakertown	Pennridge	22-6	PHS 58-30-5	
94	Thu, Nov 23, 2023	Perkasie, PA	Quakertown	Pennridge	22-7	PHS 58-31-5	
95	Thu, Nov 28, 2024	Quakertown, PA	Quakertown^{‡}	Pennridge	28-14	PHS 58-32-5	
96	Thu, Nov 27, 2025	Perkasie, PA	Pennridge^{†}	Quakertown	24-14	PHS 59-32-5	
Series: Pennridge leads 59–32–5

^{†} Indicates league championship, ^{‡} Indicates shared league championship

== Coaching records ==
Since 1930, thirteen head coaches have led both the Quakertown Panthers and the Pennridge Rams in the Thanksgiving Day game, respectively. Wayne Helman (PHS: 1955–1980) has coached more Thanksgiving Day games (26) and more victories (18) than any other coach. Though Helman achieved the most wins, Randy Cuthbert (PHS: 2005–2012), Frank Krystyniak (PHS: 1981–1987), Joe Musso (QHS: 1946–1951) and Cody Muller (PHS: 2018–2021) achieved a higher winning percentage.

Head coach (Years)	Team	W	L	T	PCT
Helman, Wayne (1955-1980)	PHS	18	8	0	0.692
Druckenmiller, Earl (1930-1945)	SPHS	11	3	2	0.688
Hollenbach, Jeff (1997-2004, 2013–2017)	PHS	9	4	0	0.692
Cuthbert, Randy (2005-2012)	PHS	7	1	0	0.875
Krystyniak, Frank (1981-1987)	PHS	6	1	0	0.857
Banas, George (2010–present)	QHS	6	10	0	0.375
Musso, Joe (1946-1951)	QHS	5	0	1	0.833
Wisneski, Dick (1952-1967)	QHS	5	10	1	0.313
Curley, Steve (1987-1995)	QHS	4	4	1	0.444
Muller, Cody (2018–2021)	PHS	3	1	0	0.750
Hosier, Bob (1991-1996)	PHS	3	3	0	0.500
Prusch, Frank (1968-1977)	QHS	3	7	0	0.300
Knoll, John (1939-1945)	QHS	2	3	2	0.286
Donnelly, John (2003-2009)	QHS	2	5	0	0.286
Fox, Ray (1996-1997)	QHS	1	1	0	0.500
Whispell, Ray (1952-1954)	SPHS/PHS	1	1	1	0.333
Beller, Kyle (2023–present)	PHS	1	2	0	0.333
Shobert, Doug (1984-1986)	QHS	1	2	0	0.333
Cherrybon, Steve (1998-2002)	QHS	1	4	0	0.200
Peiffer, Doug (1978-1983)	QHS	1	5	0	0.167
Stoneback, Jacob (1933-1938)	QHS	1	5	0	0.167
Gutekunst, Henry (1946-1948)	SPHS	0	2	1	0.000
Moyer, Bruce (1988-1990)	PHS	0	2	1	0.000
Burgy, Chuck (2022)	PHS	0	1	0	0.000
Barth, John (1930-1932)	QHS	0	3	0	0.000
Dawson, Chet (1949-1951)	SPHS	0	3	0	0.000

== Broadcasting ==
WNPV carried radio broadcasts of the contest until the station was shut down and its assets sold to mutual rival North Penn High School. Since then, it has been carried via Quakertown's YouTube channel.

== Notable players ==
- Tim Lewis, defensive backs coach for the St. Louis BattleHawks (XFL) and former NFL player for the Green Bay Packers (1983-1986)
- Will Lewis, American football executive and former NFL player for the Seattle Seahawks (1980-1981)
- Louis Riddick, analyst for Monday Night Football on ESPN and former NFL defensive back for the Atlanta Falcons (1992,1996), Cleveland Browns (1993-1995), and Oakland Raiders (1998)
- Robb Riddick, former NFL running back for the Buffalo Bills (1981-1988)
- Ken Schroy, former NFL defensive back for the New York Jets (1977-1984)
