= Paul C. Varga =

- Born: c. 1963
- Education: St. Xavier High School
- Alma mater: University of Kentucky; Purdue University

Paul C. Varga (born c. 1963) is an American businessman from Louisville, Kentucky. He served as the chief executive officer and chairman of Brown–Forman until December 2018.

== Early life ==
Varga graduated from St. Xavier High School, an all-male, Xaverian Brothers-sponsored Roman Catholic private school in Louisville, Kentucky in 1981. He then received a Bachelor of Business Administration in Finance from the Gatton College of Business and Economics at the University of Kentucky in Lexington, Kentucky in 1985 and received a Master's in Business Administration from Purdue University in West Lafayette, Indiana in 1987.

== Career ==
Varga started his career as a summer intern at Brown-Forman in May 1986. At Brown-Forman, he worked in Chicago, Southern California, Nashville, Tennessee and Louisville. He was appointed as its senior vice president and chief marketing officer in November 2000. He was appointed to its board of directors in 2003. On August 1, 2005, he was appointed as its president and chief executive officer. In 2007, he was appointed as its chairman. He now serves as its chief executive officer and chairman.

Additionally, Varga has served on the board of directors of Macy's, Inc. (NYSE: M) since March 23, 2012.

Varga is a past board member of the Muhammad Ali Center and the Louisville Urban League. He now serves on the executive committee of Greater Louisville Inc. and on the board of directors of the Kentucky Chamber of Commerce, the YMCA of Louisville, and the Three Chimneys Farm, a thoroughbred race horse breeding farm in Midway, Kentucky.

== Personal life ==
Varga is married to Melissa Varga, and they have three children. They reside in Louisville.
