= Reggie Bonnafon =

American football player (born 1996)

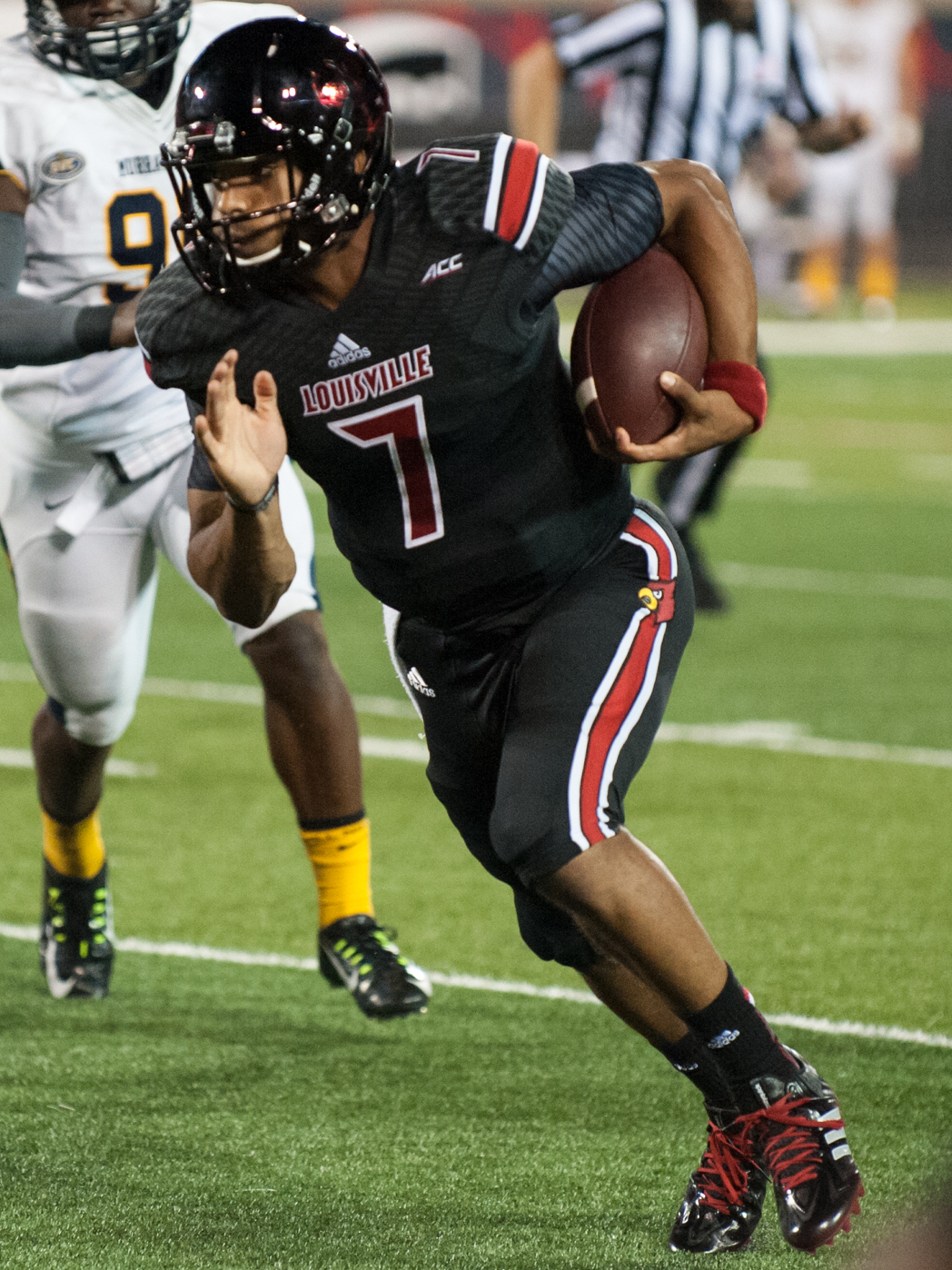
- Bonnafon with Louisville in 2014

Profile
- Position: Running back

Personal information
- Born: January 4, 1996 (age 30); Louisville, Kentucky, U.S.
- Listed height: 6 ft 0 in (1.83 m)
- Listed weight: 215 lb (98 kg)

Career information
- High school: Trinity (Louisville)
- College: Louisville
- NFL draft: 2018: undrafted

Career history
- Carolina Panthers (2018–2021); Washington Commanders (2022)

Career NFL statistics
- Rushing yards: 197
- Rushing average: 6.2
- Rushing touchdowns: 1
- Receptions: 10
- Receiving yards: 87
- Receiving touchdowns: 1
- Return yards: 111
- Stats at Pro Football Reference

Reggie Bonnafon (born January 4, 1996) is an American professional football running back. He played college football for the Louisville Cardinals and signed with the Carolina Panthers as an undrafted free agent in 2018.

== Early life ==
Bonnafon attended Trinity High School before playing college football for the Louisville Cardinals from 2014 to 2017.

== Professional career ==
=== Carolina Panthers ===
Bonnafon signed with the Carolina Panthers as an undrafted free agent on April 30, 2018. He was waived on September 1, 2018, and signed to the team's practice squad the next day.

Bonnafon signed a reserve/futures contract with the Panthers on December 31, 2018. He appeared in all 16 games in the 2019 season but was used sparingly in the rushing game behind Christian McCaffrey. He totaled 16 carries for 116 rushing yards and one rushing touchdown to go along with six receptions for 57 receiving yards.

On February 4, 2020, Bonnafon was re-signed to a one-year contract. He was waived on September 5, 2020, and signed to the practice squad the next day. He was elevated to the active roster on September 26 for the team's week 3 game against the Los Angeles Chargers, and reverted to the practice squad after the game. He was elevated again on October 3 for the week 4 game against the Arizona Cardinals, and reverted to the practice squad again following the game. He suffered an ankle injury in the game and was placed on the practice squad/injured list on October 6. He was activated back to the practice squad on November 10 and promoted to the active roster the next day. He then re-injured his ankle in practice and was placed on injured reserve on November 13.

On August 31, 2021, Bonnafon was waived by the Panthers. He was re-signed to the practice squad on October 19.

=== Washington Commanders ===
On January 11, 2022, Bonnafon signed a reserve/future contract with the Washington Commanders. He was released on August 30. On January 5, 2023, he signed with the Commanders' practice squad.
