= Trinity High School (Louisville) =

Catholic school in St. Matthews, Kentucky, United States

Location
- 4011 Shelbyville Road; Louisville, Kentucky 40207; United States; 38°15′11″N 85°39′5″W

Information
- School type: Private college preparatory
- Motto: Maximo Animi Ardore (Maximum Effort of the Soul)
- Religious affiliation: Roman Catholic
- Established: 1953
- Founder: Archbishop John Floersh
- Sister school: Sacred Heart (Unofficial Mutual Agreement)
- Educational authority: National Catholic Educational Association
- Authorizer: Trinity High School Foundation
- President: James Torra
- Principal: Nathan Sturtzel
- Chaplain: David Zettel
- Teaching staff: 102.3 (on an FTE basis)
- Grades: 9–12
- Gender: Male
- Enrollment: 1,260 (2023–24)
- Average class size: 20:1
- Student to teacher ratio: 12.3
- Campus size: 13 acres
- Colors: Green and white
- Song: Trinity Alma Mater
- Athletics: 10 KHSAA Sports; 9 Club Sports; Intramurals
- Athletics conference: Kentucky High School Athletic Association
- Mascot: Shamrocks
- Rivals: St. Xavier
- Website: www.trinityrocks.com
- Last updated: December 3, 2023

Trinity High School is a Catholic, all-boys, college preparatory high school located in St. Matthews, Kentucky, a city within Louisville Metro (consolidated city/county government). It is located in the Roman Catholic Archdiocese of Louisville. The school incorporates the Catholic tradition of teaching and learning. The school campus comprises about 1,200 students. In 1992, Trinity was named a Blue Ribbon School of Excellence. In 1995, Trinity was accredited by the non-profit Southern Association of Colleges and Schools (now known as AdvancED).

== History ==
Trinity opened its doors in 1953, when Archbishop John Floersh anticipated the growth of Louisville's eastern suburbs by choosing the site of Holy Trinity School, a former Roman Catholic church and grade school in St. Matthews. The school was formerly owned by the Roman Catholic Archdiocese of Louisville; however, Trinity is now sponsored by the Archdiocese, owned by the Trinity High School Foundation, Incorporated and governed by the Trinity High School Board, and managed and operated by the administration and faculty. The school is named after the Christian doctrine of the Trinity, which holds that God is three consubstantial persons. The school was founded with the intent to eventually become self-sufficient over time. Trinity's first class graduated in 1957.

== Campus ==
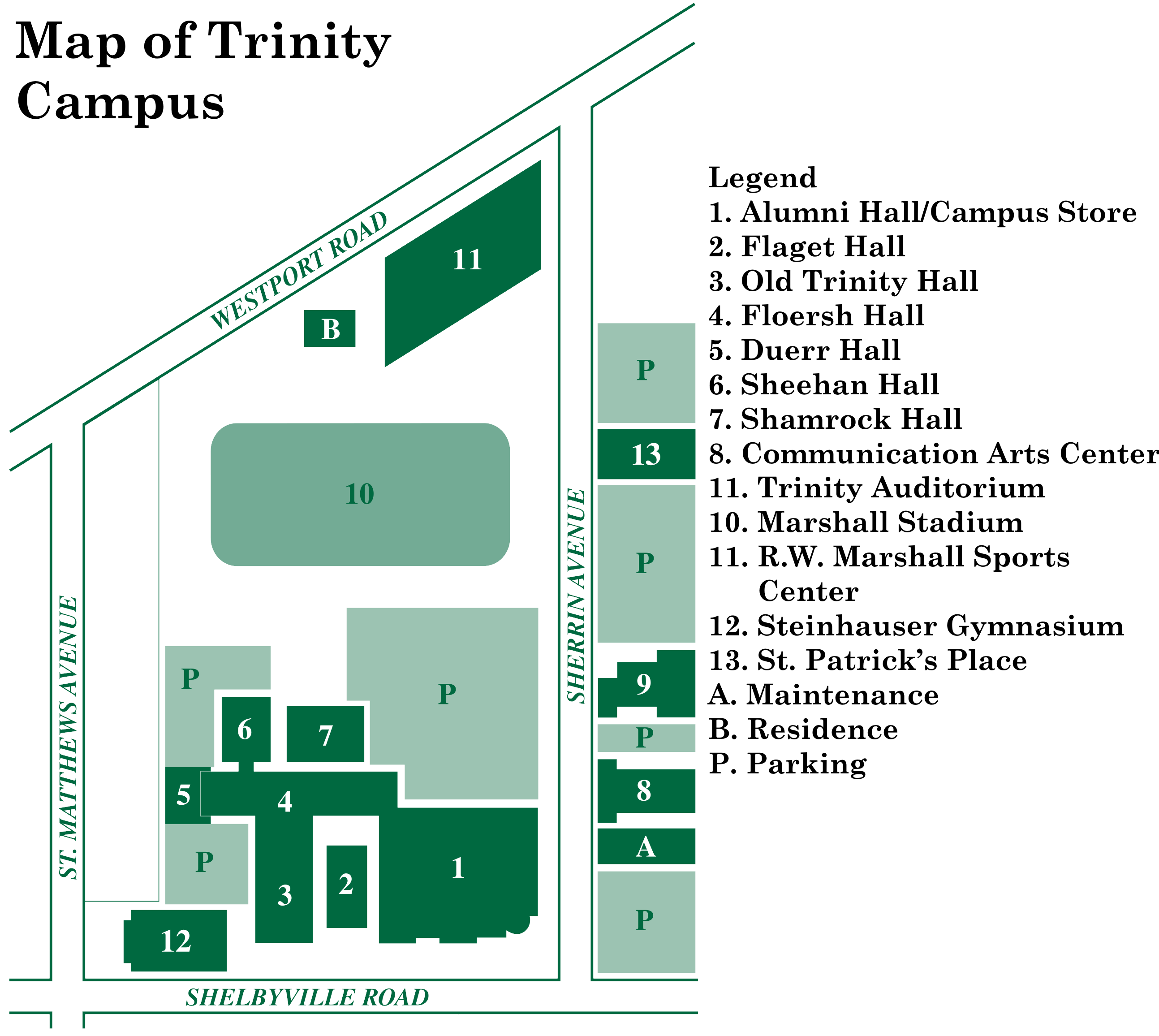
Map of Trinity High School from 2017.

On September 1, 1882, Bishop William McClosky established a new parish for the benefit of the farming community of St. Matthews. Until that time, Catholics went into the city for Mass and other liturgical services. This new parish, named Holy Trinity, was the first Catholic Church in eastern Jefferson County, and the twentieth in the area. The Church was dedicated on December 17, 1882. After outgrowing the first church, a second church was built. This second church was heavily damaged by fire in 1937 but was renovated and used until 1953. At that time, the parish donated its property to the Archdiocese for the purpose of establishing Trinity High School. The property also originally contained two buildings which would later be named Floersh Hall and Old Trinity Hall. Before the school opened in the fall of 1953, Shamrock Hall and the Trinity Football Field were added to the campus, as well as a rectory for the resident priest. In 1968, the Trinity Campus was expanded to include Sheehan Hall, which is connected to the main building.

In 1999, construction of the R.W. Marshall Sports Center was completed and serves as the hub for Trinity Athletics. In 2001, Alumni Hall was added to the main building, which serves as the school's cafeteria and administrative hub, as well as hosting the Trinity Campus Store. The Trinity Campus expanded again in 2004 to include the third expansion to the main building, Duerr Hall.

In November 2004, it was announced that Trinity would be razing its athletic stadium to build a brand new one at the end of the season. The R.W. Marshall Stadium was constructed between December 2004 and May 2005, at a cost of $3 million (equivalent to $4.95 million in 2025).

Other buildings on the Trinity Campus include the Communication Arts Center, which holds Convocation Hall, and the Trinity Theatre.

== Student body ==
=== Demographics ===
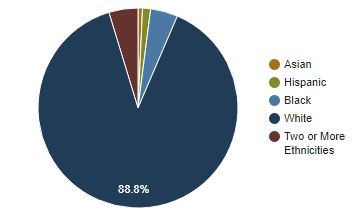
A graphical breakdown of Trinity's racial demographics.

The ethnic makeup of Trinity's student body was classified in 2015 by the United States Department of Education as being "overwhelmingly white", with 7.7% of students being African American. Other minorities include Asians (0.7%), Hispanic (1.3%), and students identifying as mixed race (4.7%). All minority students make up a combined 11.2% of the student body.

== Athletics ==
The Trinity Athletics Department participates in 16 KHSAA sanctioned sports and KSHAA sports activities. Trinity also participates in two club sports.

=== Football ===
Trinity Shamrocks' football program is statistically the most successful high school football program in Kentucky. The team annually hosts a roster of nearly 100 student-athletes, The 30 state championships are the most in the Kentucky High School Athletic Association's history and the program's 600-plus wins put them at the top among programs statewide.

The program has eight undefeated seasons, a state record 50-game winning streak from 1988 to 1991, and four Mr. Kentucky Football award winners in Keith Calvin (1973), Jeff Brohm (1989), brother Brian Brohm (2003), and James Quick (2012). The team has also won three consecutive titles on four separate occasions, first in 1988–1990, secondly in 2001–2003, again in 2023–2025, and then four consecutive seasons from 2005 to 2008. Trinity plays their home games on Father Harry Jansing Field in R.W. Marshall Stadium.

On December 8, 2007, Trinity sealed the first-ever 6A championship under the newly established class system that implemented six classes instead of the previous four. Trinity has now won a title in each of the 3A, 4A and 6A classifications, with the most recent coming in December 2025. Success in 2010 and 2011 saw Trinity finish within the top 15 in national polls for the first time in consecutive seasons. At the end of the 2011 season, the Shamrocks were named "National Champions" by Rivals.com and Sports Illustrated, among others.

Later that year, Head Football Coach Bob Beatty was voted the 2011 USA Today Coach of the Year

In December 2016, Trinity defeated Lafayette High School 56–21, giving Trinity their 24th State Football Title. The game made Trinity the most successful high school football team in the state's history. It also made Trinity's Head Football coach Bob Beatty the most successful High School Football Coach in Kentucky state history. In 2017, Trinity followed up this victory by producing a second continuous undefeated season in a row, and winning their 25th State Football Title by beating rival St. X 38–21.

In 2017, Trinity was recognized as a part of the MaxPreps Football Tour of Champions, which aims to recognize the best High School football teams in the United States. After the ceremony, Head Coach Bob Beatty stated: "Any time you are recognized by a group (MaxPreps) that represents your profession it's like you belong among the very best. This means a lot to us. MaxPreps is very important in the world of high school football and to be selected to the Tour of Champions means you're good."

As of December 2017, the Trinity varsity football team holds the largest continuous winning streak in Kentucky high school football history, at fifty consecutive wins.

Since 2013, Trinity's Football and Basketball games have been broadcast live on WGTK (970AM).

==== Football state championships ====
Below is a year-by-year breakdown of each Trinity High School football state championship.

| Year | Coach | Class | Opponent | Score |
|---|---|---|---|---|
| 1968 | Jim Kennedy | 3A | Seneca | 29–18 |
| 1972 | Jim Kennedy | 3A | Butler | 21–0 |
| 1973 | Dave Moore | 3A | Southern | 16–0 |
| 1976 | Dave Moore | 4A | Henderson County | 28–24 |
| 1977 | Dave Moore | 4A | Greenup County | 28–7 |
| 1980 | Roger Gruneisen | 4A | Paducah Tilghman | 31–8 |
| 1983 | Roger Gruneisen | 4A | Owensboro | 26–7 |
| 1985 | Dennis Lampley | 4A | Lexington Lafayette | 28–7 |
| 1988 | Dennis Lampley | 4A | DuPont Manual | 28–0 |
| 1989 | Dennis Lampley | 4A | Warren Central | 28–14 |
| 1990 | Dennis Lampley | 4A | Warren Central | 27–14 |
| 1994 | Dennis Lampley | 4A | Boone County | 21–7 |
| 2001 | Bob Beatty | 4A | Male | 45–19 |
| 2002 | Bob Beatty | 4A | Male | 59–56 |
| 2003 | Bob Beatty | 4A | Saint Xavier | 17–14 |
| 2005 | Bob Beatty | 4A | Saint Xavier | 14–6 |
| 2006 | Bob Beatty | 4A | Ryle | 46–7 |
| 2007 | Bob Beatty | 6A | Saint Xavier | 34–28 |
| 2008 | Bob Beatty | 6A | Simon Kenton | 48–0 |
| 2010 | Bob Beatty | 6A | Male | 38–0 |
| 2011 | Bob Beatty | 6A | Scott County | 62–21 |
| 2012 | Bob Beatty | 6A | PRP | 61–7 |
| 2014 | Bob Beatty | 6A | Dixie Heights | 47–14 |
| 2016 | Bob Beatty | 6A | Lexington Lafayette | 56–21 |
| 2017 | Bob Beatty | 6A | Saint Xavier | 38–21 |
| 2019 | Bob Beatty | 6A | Male | 28–6 |
| 2020 | Bob Beatty | 6A | Male | 28–0 |
| 2023 | Jay Cobb | 6A | Bryan Station | 41–20 |
| 2024 | Jay Cobb | 6A | Ryle | 42–23 |
| 2025 | Jay Cobb | 6A | South Warren | 28–14 |
| State Championships | | | 29 |

==== Rivalry with St. Xavier High School ====
The rivalry between Trinity High School and St. Xavier dates back to 1956, where every year, Trinity and St. X meet at the University of Louisville's Cardinal Stadium for the annual regular season rivalry. The game is the most-attended annual regular-season high school football game in the country, typically drawing over 35,000 fans. For the 2004 game, attendance was announced at 37,500 people. The largest recorded crowd was in 2008, with over 38,000 guests, ~6% of Louisville's population at the time. The game is also broadcast live on local TV station WAVE3. The week leading up to the game is designated "Pride Week", and various intramural school athletic and academic events are held. Currently, Trinity leads St. X in the number of games won, with the current score being 41–37, with two games having ended in a tie.

Trinity has met the Tigers in the title game six times, with Trinity holding a 4–2 advantage in those contests. In 2008, NFL Films produced a documentary about the rivalry that was nationally broadcast on CBS on Thanksgiving Day. The rivalry between the two powers also often extends into the playoffs. After losing the regular season game 48–16 in September 2005, Trinity defeated St. Xavier in the Class 4A state championship 14–6 in December. It was the school's then-state record 16th football title.

===== "Great American Rivalry" series =====
Since 2013, the annual Trinity–St. X game is featured in the Great American Rivalry Series. The series is dedicated to featuring the greatest high school football rivalries in the United States and bringing them to the national spotlight. At the end of each game, the winning team is presented with the 'Great American Rivalry' trophy, and one player is deemed the MVP, and is presented with a corresponding trophy. As of 2017, Trinity holds a 4–1 advantage in the games featured on the series.

Below is a year-by-year breakdown of the Trinity-St. X games featured on the Great American Rivalry Series.

| Year | Week | Victor | Score | Head Coach | MVP | Ref |
|---|---|---|---|---|---|---|
| 2013 | Week 7 | Trinity | 29-13 | Bob Beatty | Donald Brooks |
| 2014 | Week 6 | St. X | 21-35 | Bob Beatty | Noah Houk |
| 2015 | Week 7 | Trinity | 20-15 | Bob Beatty | Jailen Reed |
| 2016 | Week 7 | Trinity | 35-13 | Bob Beatty | Spencer Blackburn |
| 2017 | Week 7 | Trinity | 28-0 | Bob Beatty | Rondale Moore |
| 2018 | Week 7 | St. X | 7-21 | Bob Beatty | Keegan Sullivan |
| Years: | | Six | Trinity's Current Record | | 4-2 |

=== Basketball ===
The Trinity basketball program was established in 1954. In 2004, Trinity won its first regional basketball title after beating rival Male 56–46 in the 7th region finals.

By winning the regional, Trinity advanced to the state tournament for the first time in school history, losing to defending state champion Mason County in three overtimes, 66–59. The team finished the 2004–2005 season with its best record in school history, a 29–4 mark.

==== Championships ====
In 2005, Trinity won the Louisville Invitational Tournament (LIT) for the first time in school history. The team also won the Invitational Tournament in 2012. Trinity won its first KHSAA State Championship by winning the Sweet Sixteen tournament in 2012. The Rocks finished the season with a 35–3 record, and only one loss within the state of Kentucky. In 2019, the Trinity basketball team won the state championship, beating Scott County 50–40.

==== Team record ====
This is a compilation of Trinity high school basketball coach history.

| Coach Name | Start Year | End Year | Seasons | Record |
|---|---|---|---|---|
| Charles "Jeep" Quire | 1956 | 1959 | 4 | 41–41 (.500) |
| Dave Kelly | 1960 | 1961 | 2 | 14–27 (.341) |
| Ed Kellow | 1962 | 1965 | 4 | 62–44 (.585) |
| W. C. Sargeant | 1966 | 1967 | 2 | 12–34 (.261) |
| Bob Schmidt | 1968 | 1970 | 3 | 34–38 (.472) |
| Joe Thompson | 1971 | 1991 | 21 | 335–206 (.619) |
| David Aberli | 1992 | 2001 | 10 | 137–135 (.504) |
| Mike Szabo | 2002 | present | 19 | 452–158 (.741) ^{(as of 2020)} |

=== Tennis ===
In 2006, Trinity won the Kentucky boys' team tennis championship. The team won the championship on total points. This was Trinity's first championship since 1993, interrupting St. Xavier's run of winning 10 of the previous 12 championships.

=== Cross country ===
Trinity's varsity cross country team is consistently ranked as one of Kentucky's elite teams. Over the years, Trinity's cross country program has compiled a total of 20 Kentucky state team titles. The Shamrocks have won Kentucky's team cross country state title in the following years: 1957, '58, '61, '65, '66, '67, '76, '77, '81, '85, '86, '88, '91, '92, '96, '97, 2006, 2010, 2018, and 2019. These teams were coached by Jerry Denny, Ken Combs, Dick Bealmear, Rich Rostel, Chad Waggoner, and Scott Holzknecht. Most recently, the Shamrocks' 2018 varsity squad won the program its 19th overall Kentucky team state title on Saturday, November 3, 2018, at the Kentucky Horse Park in Lexington. In addition to the winning tradition that Trinity cross country is known for, the program is also well known in cross country circles for the long-standing annual meet that it hosts, The Trinity Invite. Taking place each fall In Louisville, the meet has evolved into a large event that is currently held over two different days in late September - on a Friday evening and Saturday morning. This is done so that the meet organizers can successfully manage and accommodate runners and spectators who are there to compete or watch one of the many separate races that are held during the meet. Races consist of boys' and girls' divisions for each of the following: primary (1st-3rd), grade school (4th-6th), middle school (7th-8th), high school freshman, high school JV, high school "varsity A", and high school "varsity B". Among the many local Kentucky-area teams that normally participate, many other out-of-state teams from various locations across the U.S. will often travel to Louisville to participate in this meet. The meet is held at E.P. Tom Sawyer Park, located in Louisville, KY. The four race distances for the various age groups include a 1k race, 2k race, 3k race, and a 5k race.

== Notable alumni ==
=== Athletics ===
Auto Racing

- Jacob Abel, IndyCar Series driver (2026)

Baseball

- Korbyn Dickerson, outfielder for Seattle Mariners (2025)
- Daylen Lile, outfielder for Washington (2025)
- Corey Littrell, pitcher for St. Louis (2015)
- Trever Miller, pitcher for Boston (2011)
- Jimmy Osting, pitcher for Milwaukee (2002)
- Brandon Pfaadt, pitcher for Arizona (2025)

Basketball

- Ray Spalding, forward for Houston (2021)
- David Johnson, guard for Toronto (2022)
- Jay Scrubb, forward for Orlando (2023)

Football

- Rob Bironas, kicker for Tennessee (2013)
- Reggie Bonnafon, running back for Washington (2022)
- Brian Brohm, quarterback; Offensive Coordinator for Louisville (2026)
- Jeff Brohm, quarterback; Head Coach for Louisville (2026)
- Dalyn Dawkins, running back for Tennessee (2019)
- Jack Dingle, linebacker for Green Bay (2026)
- Carwell Gardner, full back for San Diego (1997)
- Donnie Gardner, defensive end for Miami (1991)
- Brad Kragthorpe, quarterback coach for Cincinnati Bengals
- Dean May, quarterback for Denver (1987)
- Rondale Moore, wide receiver for Arizona (2023)
- Nick Petrino, quarterback; Offensive Coordinator for Coastal Carolina (2026)
- Steve Raible, wide receiver for Seattle (1976–1981); play-by-play radio commentator for Seattle
- Will Stein, quarterback; Head Coach Kentucky (2026)

Soccer

- John Michael Hayden, soccer player, head coach of University of Louisville

=== Politics and law ===
- Greg Fischer, Mayor of Louisville from 2011 to 2023
- Bob Heleringer, member of the Kentucky House of Representatives 1980–2002
- Todd Hollenbach, Kentucky State Treasurer 2008–2016, State 30th District Court judge since 2016

=== Others ===
- Steve Crump, television reporter for WBTV
- Gary J. Sullivan, video engineer
- Troy Yocum, activist and fundraiser for veteran's issues

== See also ==
- List of schools in Louisville, Kentucky
- Trinity murders
