= St. Xavier High School (Louisville) =

Saint Xavier High School

Location
- 1609 Poplar Level Road; Louisville, Kentucky 40217; United States; 38°13′09″N 85°43′35″W

Information
- Type: Private, college-preparatory school
- Motto: Latin: Numen Lumen (Let God be our divine light.)
- Religious affiliations: Roman Catholic; Xaverian Brothers
- Established: 1864; 162 years ago
- Faculty: 113.8 (on an FTE basis)
- Gender: Male
- Enrollment: 1,275 (2019–20)
- Average class size: 20 students
- Student to teacher ratio: 11.2:1
- Campus: Urban, 54 acres, 6 buildings
- Colors: Green; Gold
- Athletics: 10 KHSAA Sports; 4 Club Sports; Intramurals
- Athletics conference: Kentucky High School Athletic Association
- Mascot: Tiger
- Team name: The Saint Xavier Tigers
- Rivals: Trinity High School
- Website: www.saintx.com

St. Xavier High School, colloquially known as St. X, is a Catholic all-boys, college preparatory Xaverian school in Louisville, Kentucky. It is located in the Archdiocese of Louisville. St. Xavier was founded in 1864 by Br. Paul Van Gerwen, C.F.X.

The school is located at 1609 Poplar Level Road and is the only school in Kentucky that has received the Blue Ribbon of Excellence Award five times, the most recent of which was awarded in 2023. St. Xavier has also renovated the school grounds with Project X, an initiative to raise $28 million for new academic and athletic facilities. In total Project X raised $29.1 million for the school. In 2016, it was voted "Best Private High School" in the Louisville Magazine.

== Athletics ==
St. Xavier has the largest enrollment of boys among Kentucky high schools, (Note: In the cited KHSAA enrollment listing, schools are organized from smallest enrollment to largest, without regard to whether a school is single-sex or coeducational. However, all listings include separate entries for enrollments of boys and girls.) and had been the only school in Kentucky to have won a state championship in every Kentucky High School Athletic Association (KHSAA)-sanctioned sport open to boys before the KHSAA began sponsoring coeducational championships in bass fishing and archery in the early 21st century. St. Xavier is one of the most successful athletic programs in Kentucky, having won 172 boys' state championships across 13 different KHSAA sports. In 2005, St. Xavier was ranked #14 in "Sports Illustrated" Best High School Athletic Programs. In the 2009 fall semester, Saint X won all four fall sports. This is an unprecedented feat, taking home championships in soccer, football, cross country and golf.

The annual football game with traditional local rival Trinity High School at L&N Federal Credit Union Stadium is promoted by the schools as the most-attended annual regular-season high school football game in the country, typically drawing over 35,000 fans. The largest crowd was 38,500 and the 2007 edition of the game had an announced attendance of 37,550. Both teams have also met in the KHSAA Commonwealth Gridiron Bowl. As of 2025, St. Xavier has 13 state championships, with the last one being in 2021. In 2018, St. X announced that Kevin Wallace would be named new football head coach after Will Wolford announced that he would resign. The swim team has won thirty-seven consecutive state swimming championships, a national record for consecutive state championships out of any sport. . In total, the swim team has captured 61 swimming state titles overall, also a national record. The golf team has won the McDonald's Tournament of Champions national event multiple times and sent numerous golfers on to NCAA Division I colleges such as Kentucky, Louisville, Alabama, Wake Forest, Clemson, Cornell, Tennessee, Florida, Florida State, Oklahoma State, Ohio State and Purdue. In 2016, St. X made a 3-peat by winning its 21st title and joined Louisville Male High School to win more than 2 more titles.

As of 2018, the cross country team has won 6 of the last 7 State Championships, and was nationally ranked in the top 15 in 2012–13. In 2012, the team which consisted of 6 future NCAA DI athletes, qualified for and competed in Nike Cross Nationals, the only consensus national championship competition in all of American High School athletics. The Tigers placed 14th. In 2016, the cross country team was ranked 13th at the nationals. In addition, it won several titles along with Floyd Central at a Tiger Run meeting. The soccer team has won eight state championships since 2000, earning top 10 rankings in national polls while doing so.

The Tigers' football home of Brother Thomas More Page Stadium also hosts the Bellarmine Knights sprint football team, representing nearby Bellarmine University. The university began play in sprint football, a form of American football played under standard college rules but with player weights restricted to 178 pounds (81 kg), in the 2022 season.

== Project X ==
Saint Xavier has done renovations with Project X. Project X first did renovations with a $3 million classroom. Project X also resulted in a new tennis facility, complete with concessions and seating for 300 spectators, a new baseball stadium and a new 6,100 seat football stadium, complete with two private suites, an 8-lane rubberized track, and new spaces for offices and locker rooms. The Tigers opened the new baseball complex on March 26, 2007, with a 10–0 win over Meade County, opened the football stadium on August 24, 2007, with an 18–14 victory over Ballard and opened the 2,000 seat basketball arena with a 73–53 win over South Oldham on January 20, 2009.

With the conclusion of Project X, St. Xavier now boasts some of the best high school athletic facilities in the nation including an indoor golf facility on campus.

== Notable alumni ==
Academics

- Michael Dorris, prominent novelist (The Broken Cord, The Yellow Raft in Blue Water) and scholar; The Broken Cord won 1989 National Book Critics Circle Award for General Nonfiction
- Rudy Rucker, computer scientist, mathematician, and science fiction author
- W. Kip Viscusi, economist

Athletics

- Frank Beard, former PGA Tour golfer
- Clark Burckle, member of USA Swimming National Team
- Chris Burke, MLB player for Arizona Diamondbacks
- Ray Burse, Major League Soccer (MLS) goalkeeper for FC Dallas
- Paul Byrd, MLB pitcher for Boston Red Sox
- Bobby Curtis, Big East champion and NCAA All-American Cross Country, Track & Field athlete
- Lee Huber, All-American with Kentucky Wildcats, early professional with Akron Goodyear Wingfoots
- Bernard Jackson, former American football player
- Dicky Lyons, former National Football League player for New Orleans Saints
- Mo Moorman, former NFL player for Kansas City Chiefs
- Bobby Nichols, professional golfer, winner of 1964 PGA Championship
- Scott Padgett, former NCAA champion with Kentucky Wildcats and NBA player; head coach at Samford University
- Will Rabatin, football player
- Lee Reherman, former American Gladiator, American football player, and actor
- Desmond Ridder, American football player
- Mike Silliman, Olympic gold medalist and NBA player
- Trey Sweeney, baseball player
- Bob Talamini, American football player
- Justin Thomas, professional golfer, winner of the PGA Championship in 2017 and 2022
- Will Wolford, former NFL player and owner of Louisville Fire; St. Xavier head football coach, 2013–2018

Business

- Boland T. Jones, entrepreneur and executive
- John C. Lechleiter, CEO of Eli Lilly and Company
- Paul C. Varga, former chief executive officer and Chairman of Brown–Forman

Entertainment and media

- Leo Burmester, actor
- Tom Cruise, actor (transferred before graduation)
- Bob Edwards, former Sirius XM Radio and National Public Radio host
- Carl Ellsworth, screenwriter (Red Eye and Disturbia, among others)
- William Mapother, actor
- Victor Mature, actor, 1940s and 1950s film star
- Don Rosa, Eisner Award-winning writer and artist of Donald Duck and Uncle Scrooge comic books
- The McFarlands, YouTube family channel

Government

- Jared Bauman, American politician
- Frank W. Burke, former Democratic member of United States House of Representatives and mayor of Louisville
- Jack Conway, former Kentucky Attorney General and 2015 Democratic nominee for governor
- Romano Mazzoli, former Democratic member of United States House of Representatives
- Chris Seelbach, Cincinnati City Councilmember
- William B. Stansbury, mayor of Louisville
- Justin R. Walker, United States district judge of the Western District of Kentucky

Musicians

- EST Gee, rapper
- Jim James, lead singer of My Morning Jacket

== See also ==
- List of schools in Louisville, Kentucky
