= Independent school district =

Type of school district

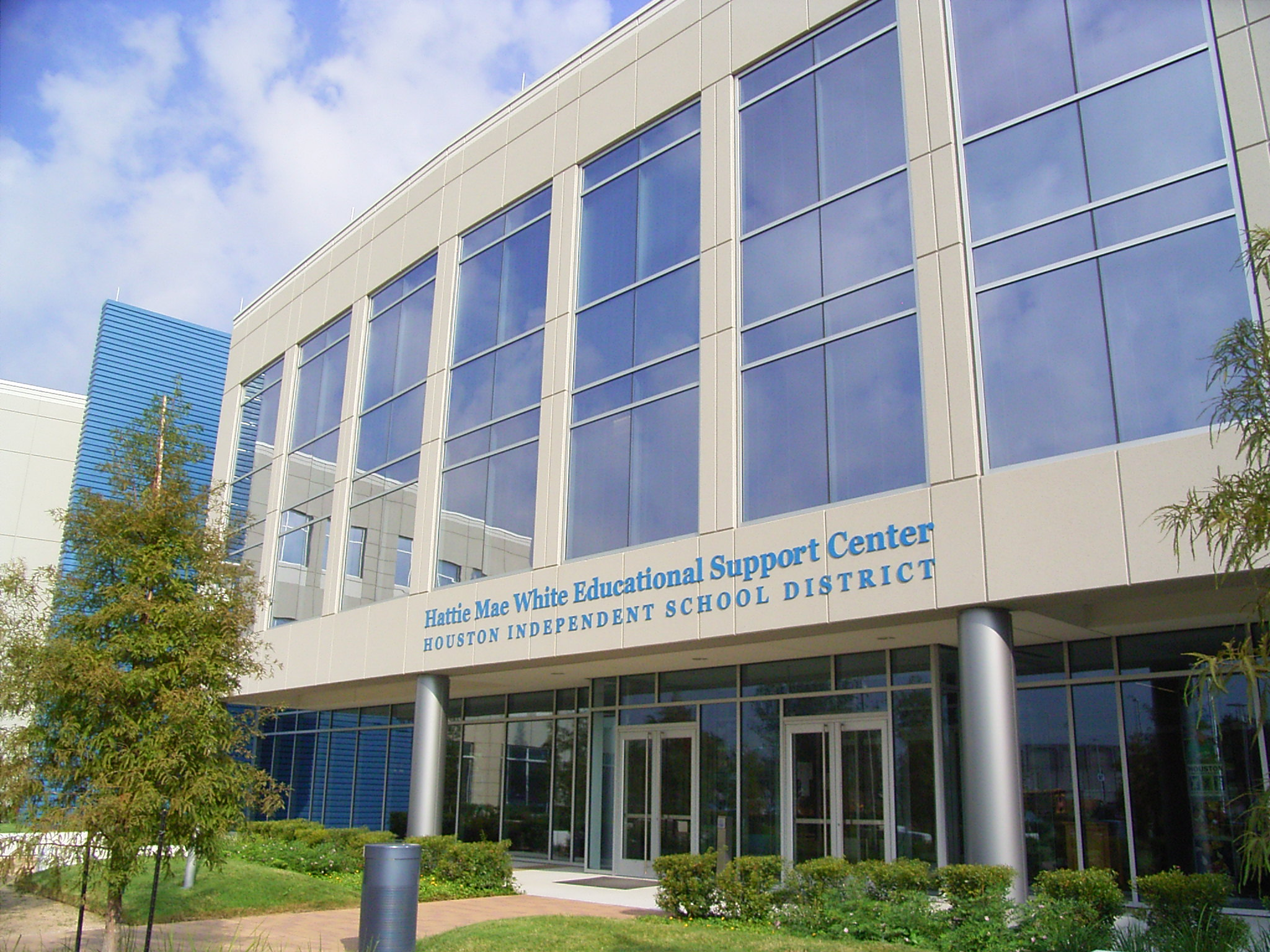
The headquarters of the Houston Independent School District, one of the largest school districts in the United States

An independent school district (ISD) is a type of school district in some US states for primary and secondary education that operates as an entity independent and separate from any municipality or county, and only under the oversight of the respective state government. As such, the administrative leadership of such districts is selected from within the district itself and has no direct responsibility to any other governmental authority. This independence normally also implies that the district has its own taxing authority that is outside the direct control of other governmental entities.

The state of Texas has by far the largest number of independent school districts, with almost all of its districts falling into this category (Stafford Municipal School District being the notable exception). The term independent may be used to describe other types of school districts, though this is less common.

The use of the term independent can vary in actual application in those states that even use the term. In Kentucky, for example, all school districts are independent of the state, county, and municipal governments. However, state law defines an "independent school district" as one whose jurisdiction does not cover an entire county, instead covering a city or cluster of cities.

== History ==
Historically, as school districts were formed in the United States, they have generally been tied to municipal or county governments who have funded and administered them.

=== Texas ===
In Texas during the early 1900s, school districts were generally divisions of county or municipal governments as in most of the country. The onset of the Texas Oil Boom dramatically changed many aspects of the state and many communities within it. Sudden discoveries of large petroleum reserves created numerous boomtowns whose populations often multiplied tremendously in short periods. The growth was often a mixed blessing for these communities. The rapid demographic change in the once small towns often initially caused severe strain on the local school systems unprepared for the rapid influx of students. Even as money was rapidly flowing in the communities, obtaining tax revenue efficiently where it was needed was often complex. Communities dealt with these problems by establishing independent school districts which could establish their own taxing authority and more quickly adjust to changing financial demands. By 1921-2, the state had 858 independent school districts and 7,369 common school districts. Through the middle of the 20th century, many smaller common school districts combined to become independent school districts. This type of school district is still the standard in Texas today. Litigation against school districts is usually handled by law firms specializing in school law and is paid for by professional legal liability coverage designed specifically for educational entities.

=== Kentucky ===
According to a 2015 report by the Legislative Research Commission, the research arm of the Kentucky General Assembly,

An ISD is one whose geographic boundaries are defined not by the county lines that define most districts but by historic boundaries within counties. These historic boundaries are associated with districts that did not merge with county districts during the early 20th century, a period when Kentucky’s many small ISDs were consolidating into county districts.

The first known action by the General Assembly to support public elementary and secondary education was a law passed in 1836 that allowed Paducah to conduct a lottery to raise funds for a public school system, thus establishing the predecessor to today's Paducah Public Schools. Two years later, the state enacted its first common school law, which set up a state educational board and provided some state funding. Since state funds were inadequate to support schools, numerous local districts were formed that levied their own taxes to support schools, a practice that was allowed but not mandated by state law. These districts "operated mostly independent of one another and the state board." The General Assembly attempted to address differences in funding between different parts of the state by passing the County School District law in 1908. This law required that by 1910, each county would form a single school district that levied a tax to support its schools, and also establish a high school for white students (at the time, racial segregation was mandated) offering a minimum 2-year program. However, local communities were still allowed to establish their own districts, and the number of such districts increased from about 200 in 1900 to 388 in 1922.

Further legislative efforts in the following decades led to consolidation of many ISDs, and the existence of ISDs was codified in 1934, with the stipulation that ISDs have at least 200 students, a limitation that exists to this day. This law also effectively forces any ISD whose enrollment falls below this limit to merge into a neighboring district. ISDs have continued to merge with county districts, with five having done so in the 21st century—Harrodsburg with Mercer County in 2006, Providence with Webster County in 2007, Monticello with Wayne County in 2014, Silver Grove with Campbell County in 2019, and West Point with Hardin County in 2020.

The boundaries of today's ISDs are largely based on those existing at the time of the 1934 act. In 1920, Kentucky's statutes on municipal annexation had stated that any new area added to a city that supported a school district would automatically become part of the school district. This changed with the 1934 act, which did not provide for the expansion of ISD boundaries, essentially "landlocking" all existing ISDs. Because of this, many ISDs are much smaller in area than the cities they serve, with dramatic examples including (but not limited to) Berea, Bowling Green, Elizabethtown, Frankfort, and Paducah. However, ten ISDs are considerably larger than the cities they primarily serve. Further legislation first enacted in 1946 and amended several times since allows for the expansion of ISDs, usually on the petition of property owners to be transferred into an ISD. However, very few ISDs have successfully expanded their borders in the following decades.

=== New York ===
All but five school districts are separate from municipal governments. The exceptions are the five cities whose populations exceed 125,000 (Buffalo, New York, Rochester, Syracuse and Yonkers), in which education is part of the municipal budget.

== Structure and administration ==
=== Texas ===
In the state of Texas, each district is run by a school board. The elected council of the school board helps determine educational policy within the boundaries of the school district, its taxable area, which is "independent" of county and municipal lines. The board also has the ultimate say in the hiring and firing of principals and superintendents and other district-wide administrative positions. The employment of teachers in individual schools, however, is usually left to the principal and administrative staff of the respective schools.

A district can serve areas outside the city limits of the city it is named for. For example, Lewisville Independent School District completely encompasses the city limits of Lewisville, The Colony, Flower Mound, and Highland Village (while Lewisville is arguably the largest of the cities it serves, this is not always the case). In fact, it is very common for multiple small suburbs or communities, with distinct city governments, to be served by a single school district. Conversely, large cities may include part or all of several school districts, often associated with communities that became part of the city by annexation while retaining their own school districts; for example, the city limits of San Antonio includes portions of the school districts Alamo Heights, East Central, North East, Northside, San Antonio, South San Antonio, Southside, and Southwest.

The term "independent" is very applicable in modern times, despite its early origins. As an example, the City of Dallas and the Dallas Independent School District are completely separate-run entities; while both experience similar problems caused by similar factors, issues and corruption that arose within the Dallas School Board did not arise from, or link to, any corruption within the city government of Dallas itself.

=== Kentucky ===
In Kentucky standard school districts are organized at county level, with the district borders being identical with county boundaries unless the county contains one or more independent districts. The precise definition of "independent school district" is found in Kentucky Revised Statutes § 160.020:

All school districts embracing designated cities (Note: KRS 160.020 also includes a definition of "designated cities" linked to the state's pre-2015 system of city classification. In that system, cities were organized into six classes based mainly on population, ranging from first to sixth in decreasing order of population. The 1934 law allowed any city in the first five classes to establish an independent district. The Kentucky Department of Education is required to maintain and publish a registry of designated cities.) together with the territory within their limits, including any territory added for school purposes outside of the city limits, and all independent graded common school districts having a school census enumeration of two hundred (200) or more children, constitute independent school districts, except those which have merged with a county school district since June 14, 1934.

Independent districts are completely separate from any county district. Both types of districts have taxing authority independent of counties, although the taxes they levy are usually physically collected by county governments. Following the most recent closures of independent districts in 2019 and 2020, the state has 51 independent school districts along with 120 county districts. The largest concentrations of independent districts are found in Northern Kentucky and the eastern coal region. Independent districts can be associated with:

- a single city—such as Ashland, Bowling Green, Owensboro, or Paducah—or
- a cluster of adjoining cities—such as the Caverna district, serving Cave City and Horse Cave; Erlanger–Elsmere, or the Russell district, which also serves Bellefonte and most of Flatwoods.

Kentucky independent districts can cross county lines. The two cities served by the Caverna district are in different counties. Another such district serves Corbin, a city divided by a county line.

=== New York ===
School districts are the most common kind of special district in New York. They provide, arrange, or contract for all public education services, including special education and school transportation, the latter also for non-public schools.

School districts are rarely precisely coextensive with the cities, towns, villages, or hamlets that bear the same name, meaning that a person living in one hamlet or village might send their children to a school associated with a different hamlet or village. Residents pay school taxes to the same school district in which they live and any children living with them attend school. All tax-paying residents are eligible for the STAR Program tax rebate, which in effect lessens the value of an individual's primary residence to lessen the tax burden on the residence.

All but five school districts are separate from municipal governments. The exceptions are the five cities whose populations exceed 125,000 (Buffalo, New York, Rochester, Syracuse, and Yonkers), in which education is part of the municipal budget.

Schools in the city of New York are controlled by the New York City Department of Education, and the city is divided by the department into 11 "school regions" (10 geographic regions and a "District 75" for students with disabilities)

There are five types of school districts in the state, each with slightly different laws.

==== Common school district ====
Common school districts, established in 1812, were the first type of school district in the state. In July 2004, there were only 11 such districts remaining. They are not authorized to provide secondary education. They must, therefore, contract with neighboring school districts to provide high school education for pupils in the district. Typically one trustee or a three-person board of trustees will govern the district.

==== Union free school district ====
In 1853, the legislature established union free school districts, which are districts resulting from a "union" of two or more common school districts, "free" from the restrictions that previously barred them from operating high schools. In July 2004, there were 163 school districts of this type. Despite being able to operate high schools, thirty-one of these districts provided only elementary education. Those districts that are not components of central school districts provide secondary education either by contracting with other districts or being located in one of the three central high school districts. Each union free school district is governed by a three- to nine-member board of education.

==== Central school district ====
Central school districts are the most prevalent type of school district in New York. In July 2004, there were 460 such districts. They began as a result of legislation in 1914. Central school districts may form from any number (including one) of common, union free, and/or central school districts. Central school districts are permitted to provide secondary education. Its board of education must consist of five, seven, or nine members and length of service must be three, four, or five years, each decided upon by the voters in the district.[62]

==== Central high school district ====
Not to be confused with central school districts, there are only three central high school districts in New York state, all in Nassau County:[63] Bellmore–Merrick Central High School District,[64] Sewanhaka Central High School District,[65] and Valley Stream Central High School District.[66] Central high school districts provide secondary education to students in two or more common or union free districts. With creation authorized by the legislature in 1917 and repealed in 1944, creation was reauthorized exclusively for Suffolk County in 1981. Such districts already established were not affected by the repeal.

==== City school district ====
In those cities with populations exceeding 125,000, the city school districts are coterminous with the city limits, and education is part of the municipal budget. These districts cannot incur debts or levy taxes. The governmental structure in all of these except for New York is that of an elected or appointed board of education. New York's public education is headed by a chancellor and has a 13-member all-appointed Department of Education Panel for Education Policy.

The city school districts for the 57 cities having fewer than 125,000 people are separate from the municipal government and are authorized to levy taxes and incur debt. Each of them is governed by an elected board of education with five, seven, or nine members. Districts for smaller cities often extend beyond the city borders and are referred to as "enlarged city school districts", seven of which have reorganized as "central city school districts".

==== Supervisory school district (BOCES) ====
Owing to the extremely large number (730) of school districts, many of which are quite small, most of them are organized into 37 supervisory districts. Each of these has a Board of Cooperative Educational Services (BOCES). Each BOCES provides services that are considered difficult for the component school districts to provide on their own, often including special classes for students with disabilities, trades, medical professions such as physical therapy or other specialized classes.

== See also ==
- Education in Kentucky
- Education in Texas
- Education in New York (state)
