= Elizabethtown High School =

Public secondary school in Elizabethtown, Kentucky, United States

Coordinates: 37.7047°N 85.8525°W

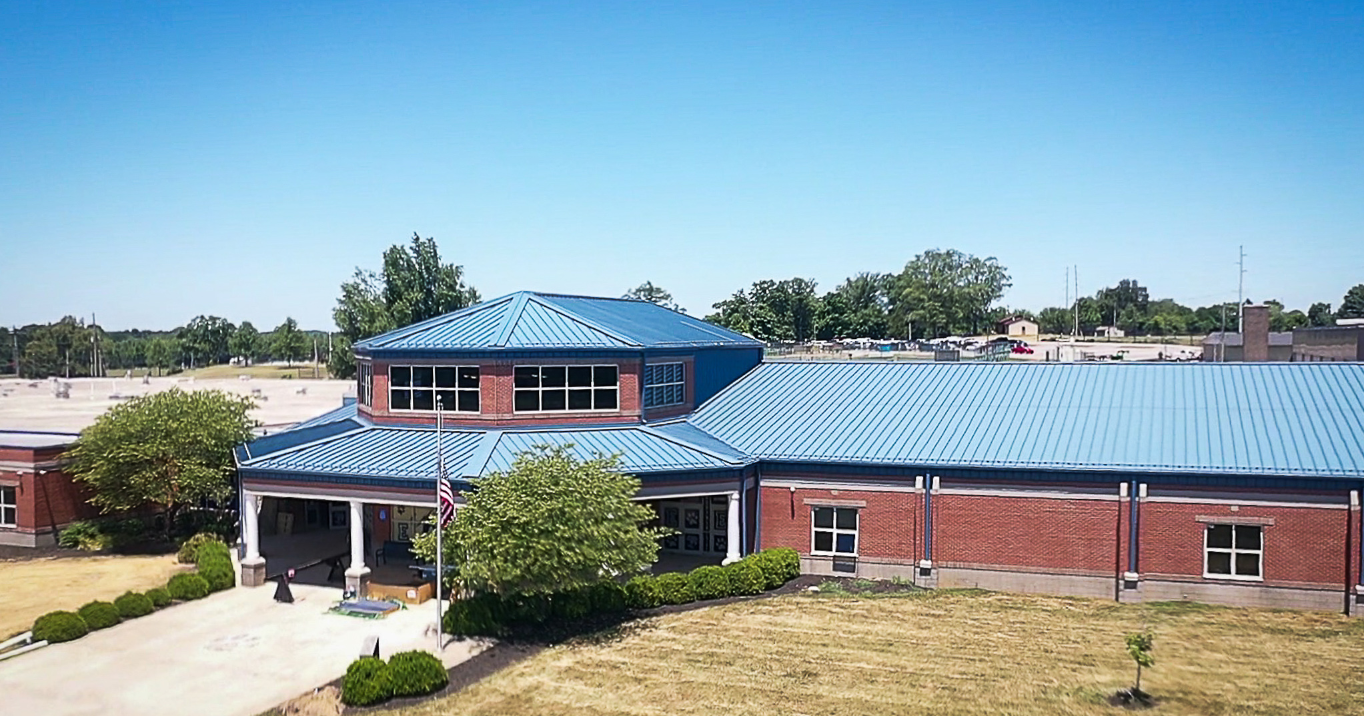
- The fourth and current Elizabethtown High School building.

Location
- 620 N Mulberry St; Elizabethtown, Kentucky 42701; United States

Information
- Type: Public; Secondary
- Motto: Tradition of Excellence
- Established: 1908
- School district: Elizabethtown Independent Schools
- Superintendent: Paul M. Mullins
- NCES School ID: 210165000323
- Principal: Josh Henderson
- Teaching staff: 47.10 (on an FTE basis)
- Grades: 9–12
- Enrollment: 799 (2023–2024)
- Student to teacher ratio: 16.96
- Campus: Suburban
- Color: Old Navy NorthWestern purple Golden Yellow Old Gold
- Fight song: Stand Up and Cheer
- Mascot: Panther
- Nickname: Panthers
- Yearbook: The Etonian
- Feeder schools: Talton k. Stone Middle School
- Website: ehs.etown.kyschools.us

Elizabethtown High School (or EHS) is a four–year public high school located in Elizabethtown, Kentucky, United States. A part of Elizabethtown Independent Schools (EIS), it is commonly referred to as E-Town High School or EHS.

Elizabethtown High School ranked #7 in the state on the 2009 spring exam.

The school has a population of 775 students and employs about 50 teachers. Josh Henderson has been the principal since July 1, 2024.

Through the 2019–20 school year, it served high school students in West Point, and therefore was a feeder high school of the West Point Independent School District, which only covered grades K–8. This arrangement ended on July 1, 2020, when the West Point district merged into Hardin County Schools (HCS). West Point students already enrolled at EHS will be allowed to continue their education there; future West Point high school students will attend North Hardin High School.

== History ==
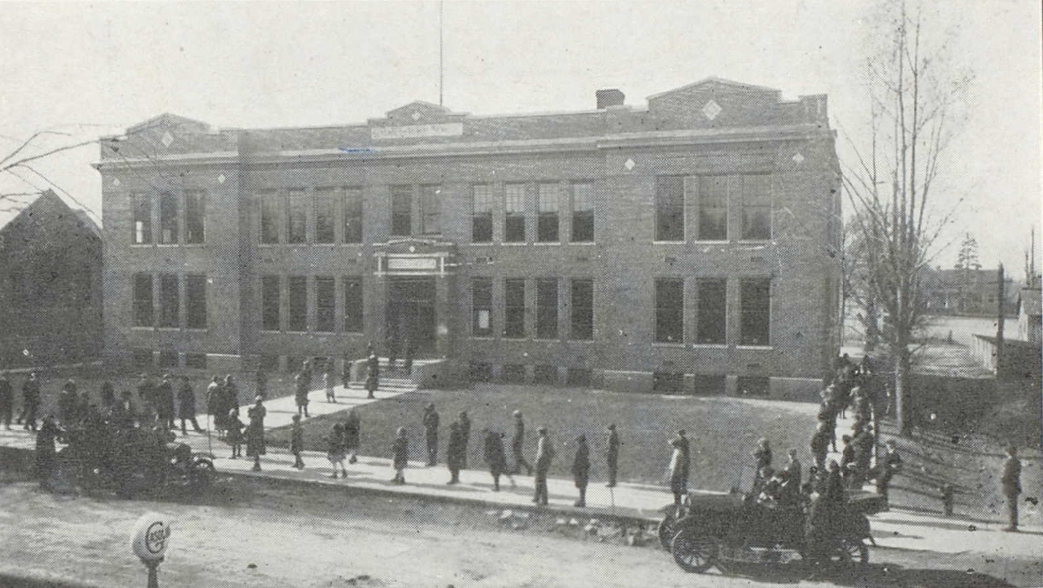
Photo of the second Elizabethtown High School building, 1923. This building was used from 1915 to 1953

Elizabethtown High School was founded in 1908. The first building used by Elizabethtown High School was the Elizabethtown Graded School Building, which served elementary school to high school. It was built in 1816, and demolished around 1914.

The second Elizabethtown High School building was built in 1914 at a cost of $23,000. It opened in 1915, and in 1923 a gymnasium and auditorium was added to the school building at a cost of $20,000. In 1953, the school was destroyed by a boiler explosion. The land it was on is currently the city hall parking lot.

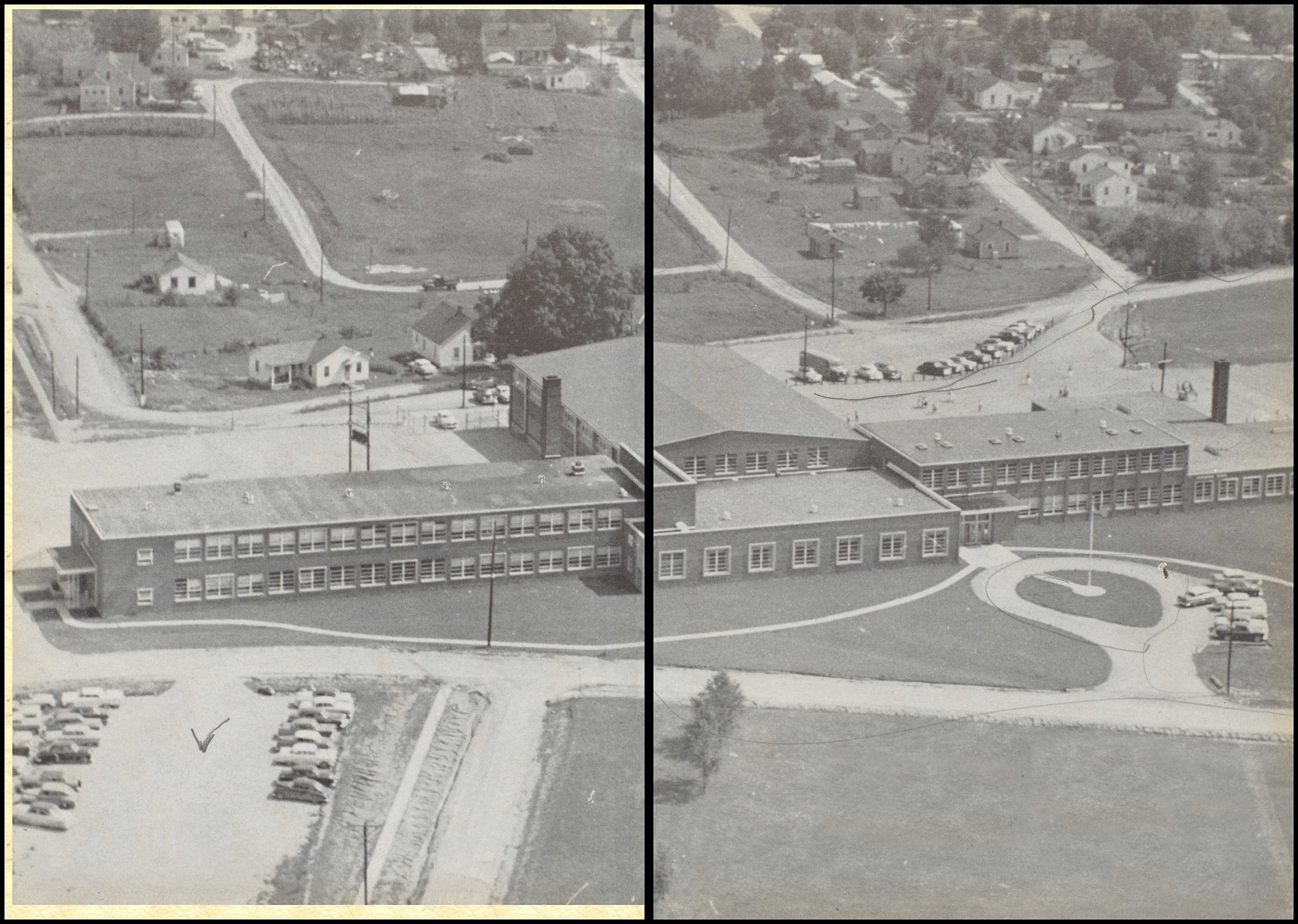
Photo of the third Elizabethtown High School building, 1958. This building was used from 1954 until 1971.

The third building was built in late 1953. The building was located on 323 Morningside Dr. and was used until fall 1971. After Elizabethtown High School moved buildings, the old building was converted into a middle school, and named T.K. Stone Junior High (now T.K. Stone Middle School), in honor of Talton K. Stone, who served as superintendent from 1953 to 1971. during the time it was the EHS building.

The fourth, and current building was built in 1971. It is located at 620 N Mulberry St. The original state of the fourth building was designed to have three hallways and a gymnasium and a commons area, in 2005 the commons area was extended, a fourth hallway, a science lab, and an auxiliary gym were added to the building in the 2005 renovation.

== Awards, recognition and rankings ==
As of 2024, the school is the 41st-ranked public high school in Kentucky out of 400 schools. Schooldigger.com ranked the school 75th out of 290 public high schools satewide in 2024, based on the combined percentage of students classified as proficient or above proficient on the language arts literacy and mathematics components of the Kentucky state test.

== Demographics and achievement ==
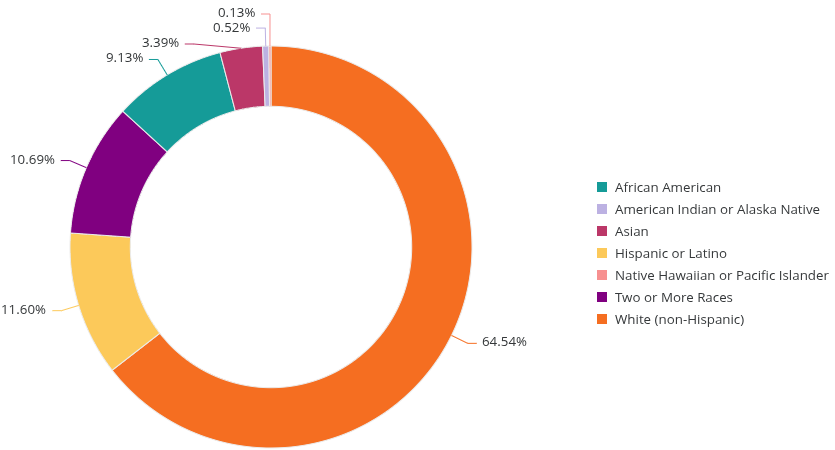
Student diversity in Elizabethtown High School, Elizabethtown, KY

According to the Kentucky Department of Education, as of the 2023–2024 school year, the racial distribution of EHS students is as follows:

- 64% White
- 11% Hispanic or Latino
- 10% Two or More Races
- 9% African American
- 3% Asian
- .52% American Indian or Alaska Native
- .13% Pacific Islander or Native Hawaiian

The school also has 3% English Learners, 9% disabled students, and .8% homeless students.

On the reading section of the Kentucky Summative Assessment, 27% scored proficient and 23% scored distinguished. On the math section of the test, 30% scored proficient and 11% scored distinguished.

According to the Kentucky Department of Education, as of the 2023–2024 school year, the school has a 98.3% graduation rate. The school also has a proficiency rate of:

- 50% Reading
- 41% Mathematics
- 41% Social studies
- 33% On-Demand Writing
- 6% Science

== Athletics ==
- Archery
- Baseball
- Basketball – Boys
- Basketball – Girls
- Bowling
- Cheerleading
- Cross country
- E-Sports
- Fishing
- Football
- Golf – Boys
- Golf – Girls
- Lacrosse – Boys
- Lacrosse – Girls
- Soccer – Boys
- Soccer – Girls
- Softball
- Swimming – Boys
- Swimming – Girls
- Tennis – Boys
- Tennis – Girls
- Track
- Volleyball

The Elizabethtown Panthers and Lady Panthers represent the school and have won 14 state championships.

== Notable alumni ==
- Antwain Barbour – Former professional basketball player.
- Erin Boley – Women's basketball player.
- Mark Bradley – Former professional baseball outfielder.
- Chaz Cardigan – Singer and alternative rock artist.
- Brandon Deaderick – Former American football defensive end.
- Zipp Duncan – Former football guard.
- Jim DuPlessis – Politician and Engineer.
- Lauren Hartlage – Professional golfer.
- Mitchell Henry (American football) – College football player
- G. Scott Hubbard – Physicist
- Steve Jameson – Painter & children's book illustrator.
- Vanessa Marshall – video game, animation, and film voice actress.
- Thomas I. Miller – 12th president of Murray State University
- Steffphon Pettigrew – Former professional basketball player.
- Jada Stinson – Professional basketball player.
- Chris Todd – Former college football quarterback.
- Curtis Washington – Professional basketball player.
- Jansen Wilson – Professional soccer player.

== Notable former staff ==
- Jack Curtice – Basketball and Football coach for the 1930–1932 school years.
