= West Point, Kentucky =

- City
- Location of West Point in Hardin County, Kentucky.
- Coordinates: 37°59′56″N 85°57′09″W
- Country: United States
- State: Kentucky
- County: Hardin

Area
  - Total: 2.69 sq mi (6.97 km^{2})
  - Land: 2.66 sq mi (6.90 km^{2})
  - Water: 0.023 sq mi (0.06 km^{2})
- Elevation: 436 ft (133 m)

Population (2020)
  - Total: 952
  - Density: 357.2/sq mi (137.93/km^{2})
- Time zone: UTC-5 (Eastern (EST))
  - Summer (DST): UTC-4 (EDT)
- ZIP code: 40177
- Area code: 502
- FIPS code: 21-81930
- GNIS feature ID: 0506467
- Website: westpoint.ky.gov

West Point is a home rule-class city in Hardin County, Kentucky, United States, near the edge of Fort Knox military reservation on Dixie Highway. It is located in a former meander bend of the Ohio River. The population was 952 as of the 2020 Census, up from 797 from the 2010 census, but still down from 1,100 at the 2000 census.

West Point is part of the Elizabethtown–Fort Knox Metropolitan Statistical Area.

== History ==
West Point was founded by pioneer James Young, who built a cabin at the site in 1789 and, in 1797, built a brick house and inn that is still standing today. In 1803, Lewis and Clark passed nearby and recruited West Point citizen John Shields to join their Corps of Discovery.

West Point sits at the confluence of the Ohio and Salt rivers, a strategic position that led Union forces to construct a fort here during the Civil War to protect their supply routes. Fort Duffield is the state's largest and best-preserved earthen fortification from the period.

West Point also retains many of its other historic resources, and a large portion of the community is listed in the National Register of Historic Places as a historic district.

One of the newest preservation projects in West Point is the rehabilitation of the West Point Independent Colored School (1926), one of the "Rosenwald Schools" built by philanthropist Julius Rosenwald to educate African-Americans in rural areas. Plans call for using the one-room school as a visitor, educational, and research facility.

West Point commemorated the bicentennial of Lewis and Clark's visit with a heritage festival that celebrated local history and drew heritage tourists. Year-round, Fort Duffield is an important tourist destination, and the city recently secured a grant to fund walking trails at the site.

West Point was a childhood residence of the late Louisiana Governor James A. Noe Sr., a wealthy oilman and landowner.

== Geography ==
West Point is located at the northern end of Hardin County at 37°59′30″N 85°57′16″W (37.991543, -85.954540), at the confluence of the Ohio and Salt rivers. The Dixie Highway (U.S. Routes 31W and 60) passes through the city just east of the downtown, leading northeast 21 miles (34 km) to Louisville and south 23 miles (37 km) to Elizabethtown, the Hardin County seat. Fort Duffield Park is located in the southern part of the city, with the remains of the fort sitting on top of a hill that rises 300 feet (91 m) above the downtown. The city is bordered to the south by the northern end of Fort Knox.

According to the United States Census Bureau, the city of West Point has a total area of 0.54 square miles (1.4 km^{2}), all land.

== Demographics ==
Historical population
Census	Pop.	Note	%±
1870	206		—
1880	441		114.1%
1900	489		—
1910	782		59.9%
1920	724		−7.4%
1930	697		−3.7%
1940	992		42.3%
1950	1,669		68.2%
1960	1,957		17.3%
1970	1,741		−11.0%
1980	1,339		−23.1%
1990	1,216		−9.2%
2000	1,100		−9.5%
2010	797		−27.5%
2020	952		19.4%
U.S. Decennial Census

As of the census of 2000, there were 1,100 people, 439 households, and 281 families residing in the city. The population density was 408.5 inhabitants per square mile (157.7/km^{2}). There were 566 housing units at an average density of 210.2 per square mile (81.2/km^{2}). The racial makeup of the city was 98.09% White, 0.64% African American, 0.64% Native American, 0.09% Asian, 0.09% from other races, and 0.45% from two or more races. Hispanics or Latinos of any race were 0.82% of the population.

There were 439 households, out of which 31.4% had children under the age of 18 living with them, 43.7% were married couples living together, 14.8% had a female householder with no husband present, and 35.8% were non-families. 29.8% of all households were made up of individuals, and 11.6% had someone living alone who was 65 years of age or older. The average household size was 2.51 and the average family size was 3.09.

The age distribution was 26.2% under 18, 10.6% from 18 to 24, 30.0% from 25 to 44, 20.6% from 45 to 64, and 12.5% who were 65 or older. The median age was 34 years. For every 100 females, there were 101.1 males. For every 100 females age 18 and over, there were 97.1 males.

The median income for a household in the city was $29,792, and the median income for a family was $35,139. Males had a median income of $23,611 versus $18,125 for females. The per capita income for the city was $13,381. About 15.9% of families and 20.3% of the population were below the poverty line, including 29.3% of those under age 18 and 15.1% of those age 65 or over.

== Education ==
West Point Independent School District operated a single K-8 school, while high school students attended Elizabethtown High School of the Elizabethtown Independent Schools. On January 28, 2020, the West Point Independent Schools Board of Education voted unanimously to begin merger negotiations with Hardin County Schools; the West Point board approved the merger on February 18 and the Hardin County board followed two days later. The merger took effect on July 1, 2020. The relocation of students sent kindergarten students to North Park Elementary, first through fifth grades to Vine Grove Elementary, and sixth through eighth grade to J.T. Alton Middle School. Students who attended Elizabethtown High before the merger completed their high school there, while West Point high school students after the merger attend North Hardin High School.

== In popular culture ==
West Point and neighboring town Muldraugh are featured in the open world survival horror game Project Zomboid as spawn points and explorable locations. The nearby city of Louisville is also featured in the game. For the sake of in-game difficulty, the infected population is far more abundant than the population of West Point during the year in which the game takes place.

== See also ==
- List of cities and towns along the Ohio River
