= Not OK =

Not OK may refer to:

- "Not OK" (5 Seconds of Summer song), 2025
- "Not OK" (Kygo and Chelsea Cutler song), 2019
- "Not OK" (Peach Tree Rascals song), 2020
- "Not OK!", a 2020 song by Chaz Cardigan
- "Not OK", a 2020 song by Maria Mena
- Not Okay, a 2022 film.
