= Fort Duffield =

- U.S. National Register of Historic Places
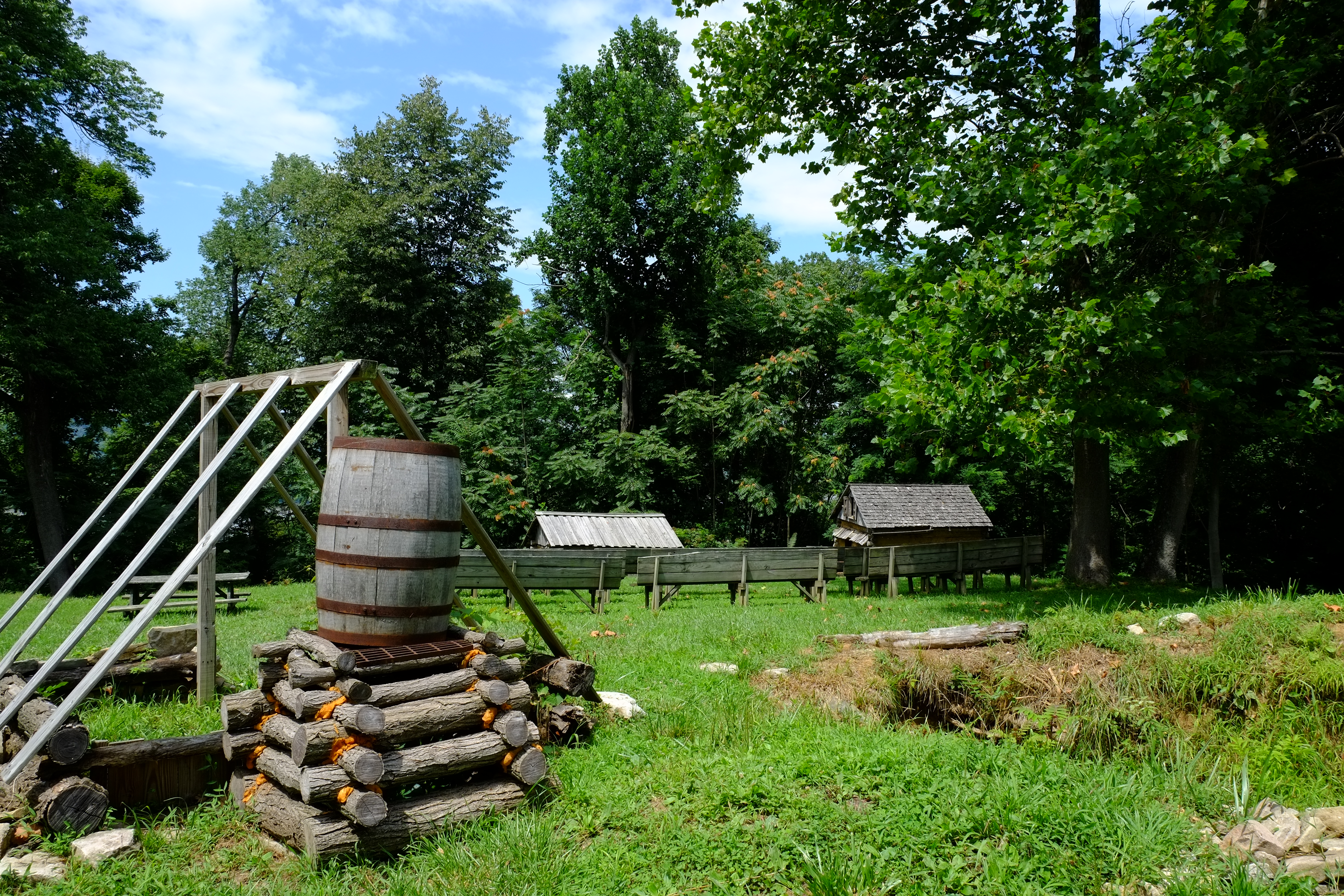

- Location within Kentucky Location within the United States
- Nearest city: West Point, Kentucky
- Coordinates: 37°59′35″N 85°56′31″W
- Built: 1861
- Website: Civil War Fort Duffield
- NRHP reference No.: 93001584
- Added to NRHP: January 31, 1994

Fort Duffield is a Union American Civil War fort located outside West Point, Kentucky. It saw use in 1862, and was abandoned when it appeared that the war would never come near the fort. Ironically, John Hunt Morgan would in 1863 lead his Raiders right past the fort and may have been stopped had the fort not been abandoned.

William Tecumseh Sherman was concerned with the Confederate positions in Bowling Green and Columbus, and sent the 37th Indiana and the 9th Michigan Infantry Regiment to West Point. The plan was to use West Point as a Union supply base for Elizabethtown. Sherman ordered the fort to be built on Pearman Hill to protect the town and supply route. Construction began on November 3, 1861, and was finished in two months. The fort was named for the Rev. George Duffield of Detroit, whose son, Colonel William W. Duffield, led the 9th Michigan Infantry. There were 950 troops stationed there, but they were soon sent to the front lines and the fort was mostly unused in 1862, seeing its last use that fall.

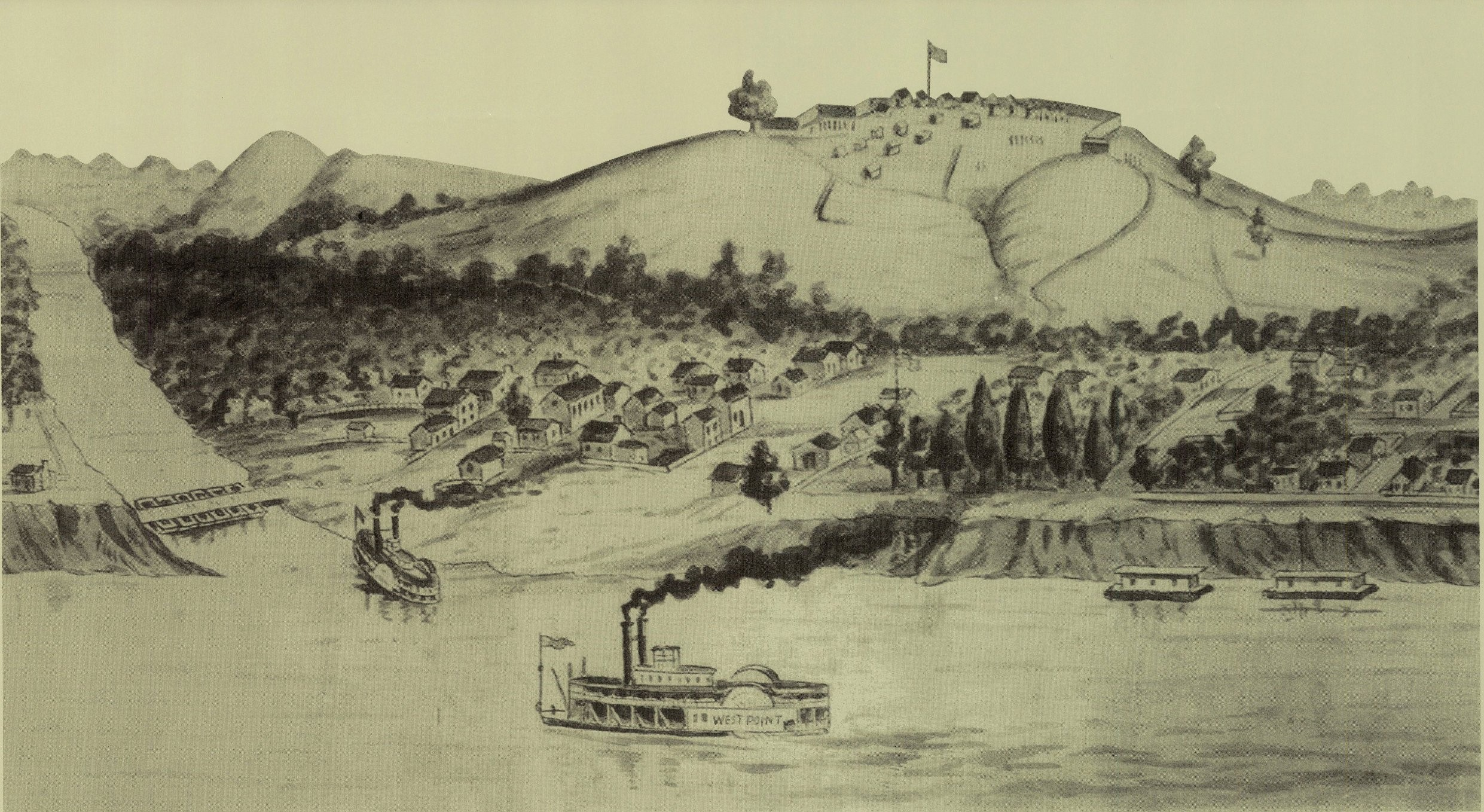
Sketch of Fort Duffield in 1861

The fort is mostly a serpentine wall, unlike the typical star-shaped Civil War forts in Kentucky. The earthworks of the fort are well-preserved. Originally there was a one-mile clearing between the fort and any trees, but since the fort's abandonment the forest has grown back around the fort. A fresh water spring was located inside the fort.

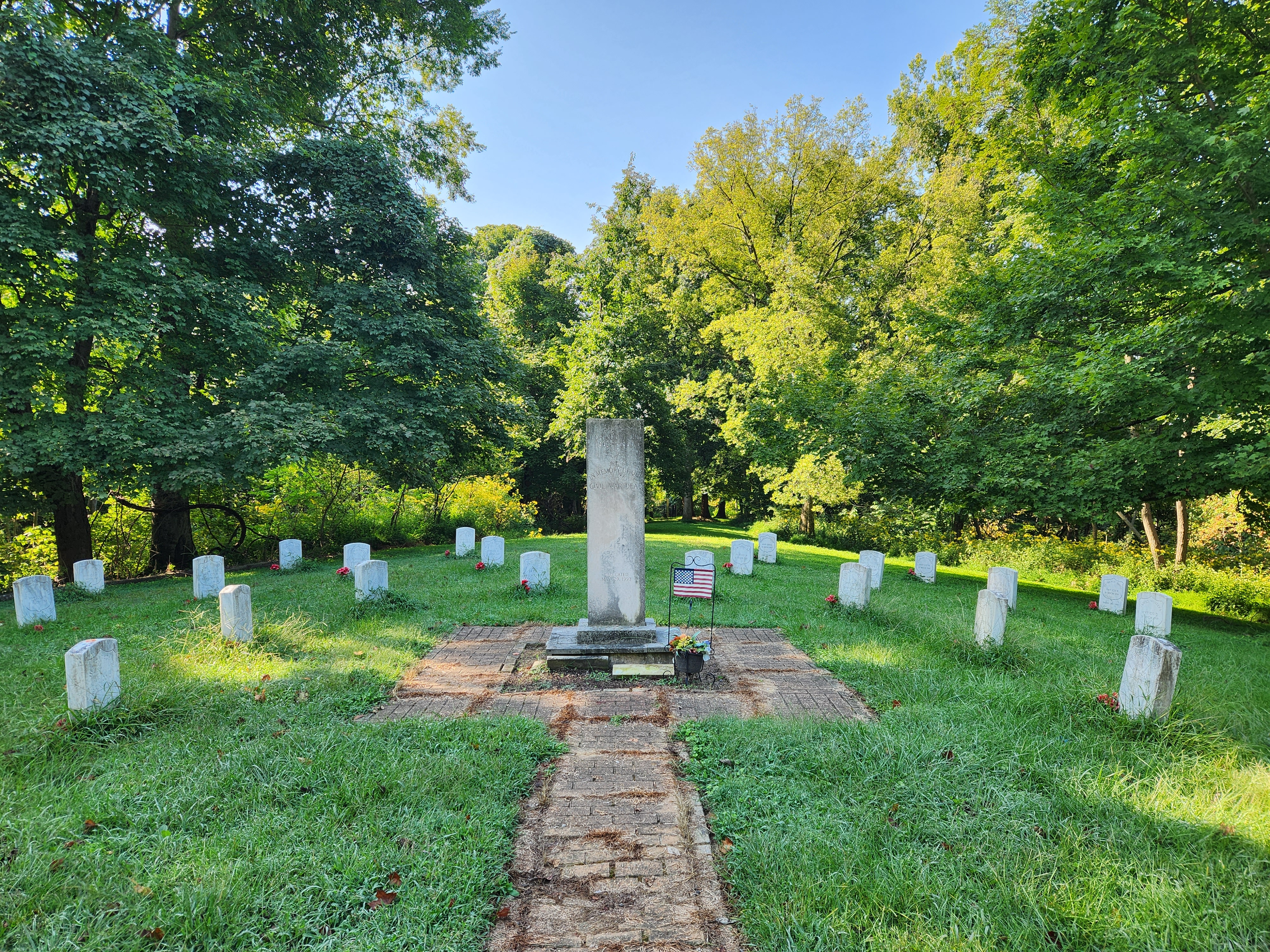
Fort Duffield Memorial Cemetery

In 1995 a team of volunteers led by Billy Morris and Dennis Wren started the clearing of overgrowth. By 1996 it was opened as a tourist attraction. You could catch a bus in the town of West Point and ride it to the top of the steep hill where there are wooden facilities and an information station showing a map of the fort and the different paths to take. The full tour of the fort included wooden walkways to the top where you could see small cabins built and tents where reenactors would do demonstrations. You could follow the path on to the lookout point that gives a clear view of the Ohio River and West Point. From there you were able to take a small pathway past the very natural spring that was used in the times of the Civil War. This trail took you back to the beginning of the wooden pathway and start of the walking tour by the information station and outhouses.

As of 2021 there are no longer reenactments or bus rides, but visitors can still hike the hill and follow the trails and pathways and see the cabins. There is also a bench to sit at the lookout point. The natural spring has been excluded from the public trail due to concerns over safety. Volunteers from West Point Historical Society and the West Point Historical Museum help with the upkeep of the fort. There is also a Civil War cemetery on the west side of Fort Hill that has been updated with new grave markers and cleared out for visitors. The bottom of Fort Hill has a parking lot and there are multiple biking trails that start from the parking lot. There is also a boat dock and camp ground to the left of the entrance off of Dixie Highway (31w) with access to the Salt River.

== See also ==
- American Civil War fortifications in Louisville
- Kentucky in the American Civil War
- Louisville in the American Civil War
- List of attractions and events in the Louisville metropolitan area
