= Howard Stidham =

American football player (born 1954)

No. 58
- Position: Linebacker

Personal information
- Born: December 17, 1954 (age 71); Radcliff, Kentucky, U.S.
- Listed height: 6 ft 2 in (1.88 m)
- Listed weight: 215 lb (98 kg)

Career information
- High school: North Hardin (Radcliff)
- College: Tennessee Tech (1972–1975)
- NFL draft: 1976: 15th round, 416th overall pick

Career history
- San Francisco 49ers (1976)*; Green Bay Packers (1977)*; San Francisco 49ers (1977)
- * Offseason or practice squad member only
- Stats at Pro Football Reference

Howard D. Stidham (born December 17, 1954) is an American former professional football linebacker who played one season with the San Francisco 49ers of the National Football League (NFL). He was selected by the 49ers in the fifteenth round of the 1976 NFL draft after playing college football at Tennessee Technological University.

== Early life and college ==
Howard D. Stidham was born on December 17, 1954, in Radcliff, Kentucky. He attended North Hardin High School in Radcliff.

Stidham was a four-year letterman for the Tennessee Tech Golden Eagles of Tennessee Technological University from 1972 to 1975. He earned All-Ohio Valley Conference honors in 1975.

== Professional career ==
Stidham was selected by the San Francisco 49ers in the 15th round, with the 416th overall pick, of the 1976 NFL draft. He was released on August 25, 1976.

Stidham signed with the Green Bay Packers in June 1977. He was released on August 30, 1977.

Stidham was signed by the San Francisco 49ers on November 16, 1977. He played in four games on special teams for the 49ers during the 1977 season. He left camp in July 1978.
