= Fort DeWolf =

Coordinates: 37°59′01.6″N 85°43′02.7″W

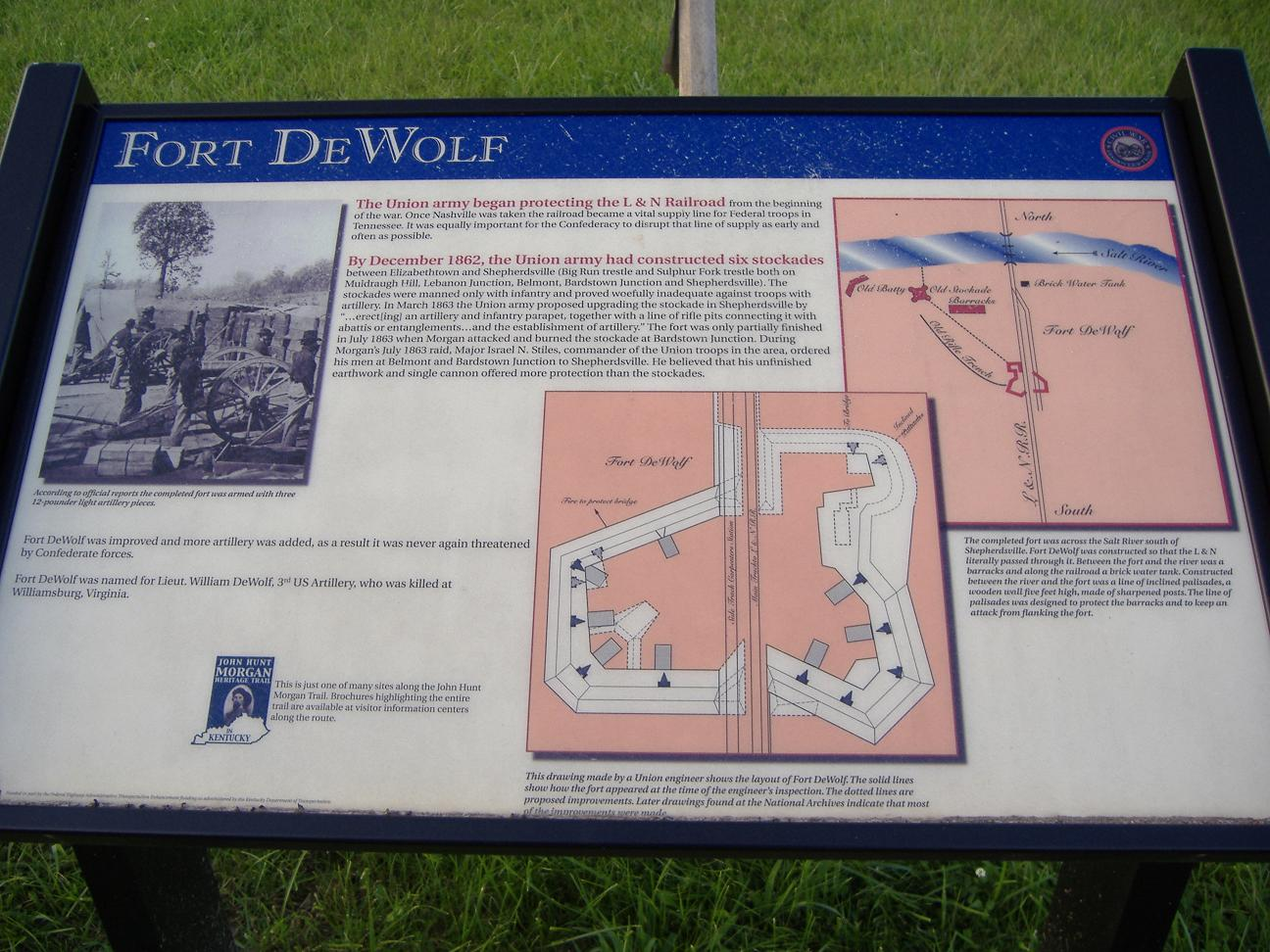
Marker denoting the fort

Fort DeWolf was an American Civil War fort located just south of Shepherdsville, Kentucky. It was placed so that the L&N railroad would bisect the fort, to better protect the vital railroad bridge over the Salt River.

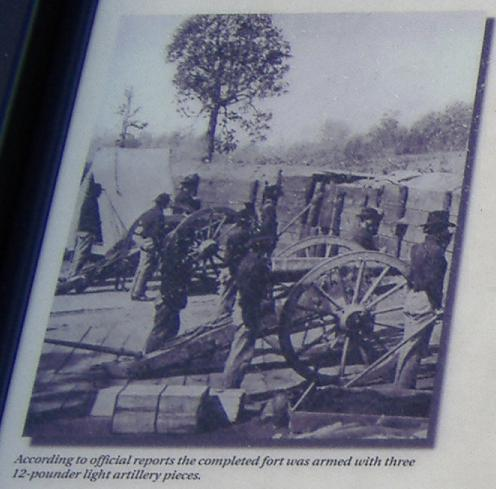

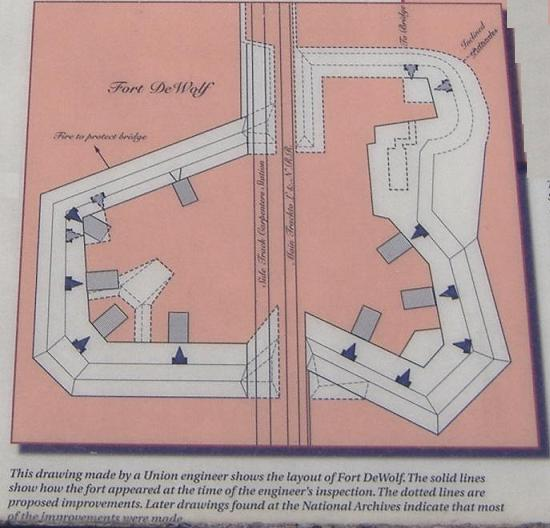

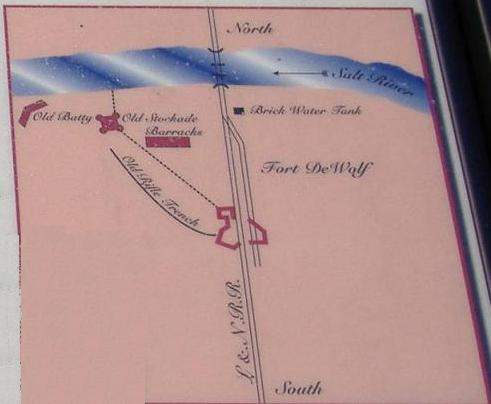

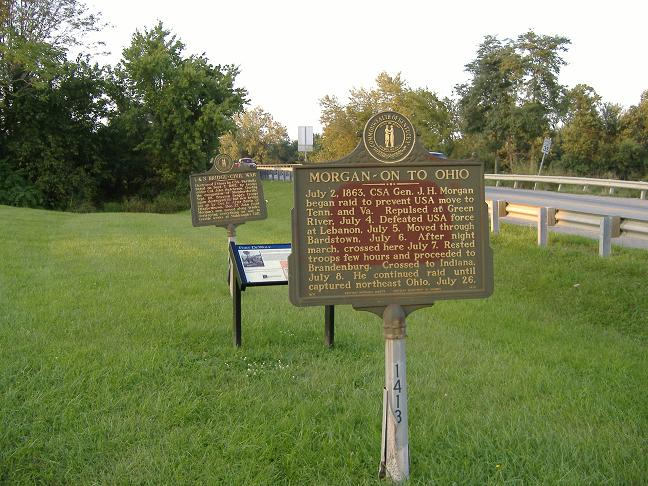

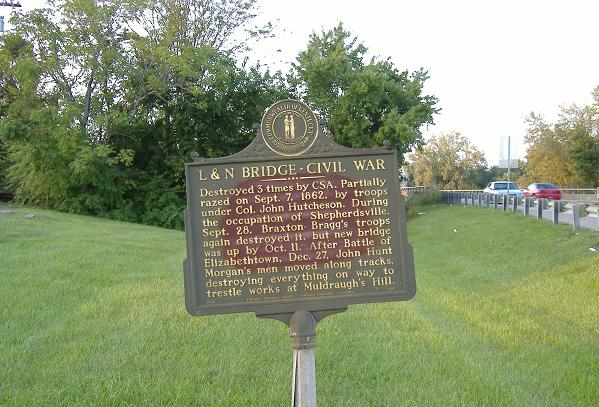

== See also ==
- American Civil War fortifications in Louisville
- Kentucky in the American Civil War
- Louisville in the American Civil War
