= Andrew Hynes =

Founder of Elizabethtown, Kentucky (1750–1800)

Andrew Hynes (February 28, 1750 – September 1800) was the founder of Elizabethtown, Kentucky, which town was named for his wife, Elizabeth Warford Hynes. The son of William and Hannah Hynes, Andrew was born in Hagerstown, Maryland, and died in Bardstown, Kentucky.

Colonel Hynes served as one of the delegates that formed the first Constitution of Kentucky, in 1792.

One of Andrew and Elizabeth's daughters, Nancy Hynes (1786–1841), married William Pope Duval, long-serving territorial governor of Florida.

Hynes' nephew, another Colonel Andrew Hynes (1786–1849), was a veteran of the War of 1812, serving as the Adjutant General for the state militia of Tennessee.
