= Elizabethtown Independent Schools =

School district in Kentucky, United States

Location
- Elizabethtown, Hardin County, Kentucky; United States

Other information
- Website: www.etown.kyschools.us

Elizabethtown Independent Schools (EIS) is a school district headquartered in Elizabethtown, Kentucky.

Through the 2019–20 school year, its high school, Elizabethtown High School, served high school students in West Point, and therefore was a feeder high school of the West Point Independent School District, which only covered grades K-8. The West Point district closed at the end of that school year and merged into Hardin County Schools (HCS), which serves the rest of Hardin County apart from Fort Knox (which has its own federally administered schools). West Point students who had attended Elizabethtown High before the HCS merger will not be able to complete their education there; the last such students are not expected to graduate in 2023.

== Schools ==
Traditional

- Elizabethtown High School
- TK Stone Middle School
- Helmwood Heights Elementary School
- Morningside Elementary School

Other

- Panther Academy
- Valley View Education Center
- Glen Dale Center

== See also ==
- Hardin County Schools
