= Elizabeth Helm Nitchie =

American educator and expert on lip reading

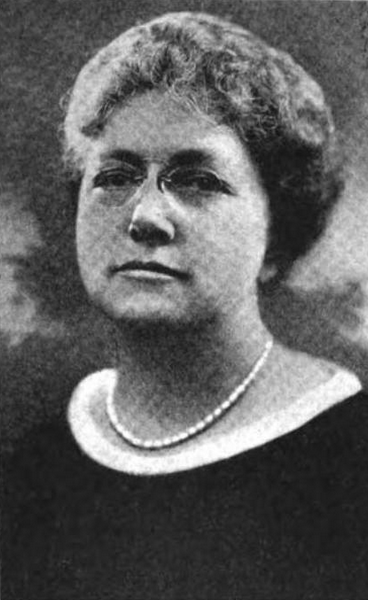
- Elizabeth Helm Nitchie, from a 1927 publication
- Born: Elizabeth Logan Helm; May 2, 1880; Elizabethtown, Kentucky
- Died: February 16, 1961 (aged 80); New York City
- Occupation: Educator
- Spouse: Edward Bartlett Nitchie

Elizabeth Logan Helm Nitchie (May 2, 1880 – February 16, 1961) was an American educator and expert on lip reading.

== Early life and education ==
Elizabeth Helm was born in Elizabethtown, Kentucky, the daughter of William Logan Helm and Florence Murray Helm. Her father died when she was a little girl. She was from the same extended family as John L. Helm, governor of Kentucky, and Benjamin Hardin Helm, a Confederate Army general during the American Civil War. (Her grandfather Henry Benjamin Helm was the first cousin of the governor.)

== Career ==
Nitchie worked as a stenographer as a young woman. In 1917, Nitchie succeeded her late husband as principal of the New York School for the Hard of Hearing, later known as the Nitchie School of Lip-Reading, in New York City. She frequently spoke and wrote about lip-reading in the 1920s and 1930s. "My own greatest handicap in teaching lip reading to the deaf is that I myself have normal hearing," she told a Brooklyn Daily Eagle interviewer in 1927. "All my teachers are either totally or partially deaf, and the general feeling is that only a deaf person can understand the attitude of the deaf and be a successful teacher." She retired from running the school in 1928.

In her later career Nitchie worked in advertising at The New York Times, and ran a stenographic bureau. She taught lip-reading to children in St. Louis in 1937.

== Publications ==
- Advanced Lessons in Lip-reading (1923)
- New Lessons in Lip reading (1950)
- Lip-reading Principles and Practice (1930, new edition, revised with Gertrude Torrey)

== Personal life ==
Elizabeth Logan Helm married Edward Bartlett Nitchie in 1908. They had a son, Edward Jr. Her husband, who was deaf, died in 1917, and she died in 1961, at the age of 80, in New York City. Her grave is in Green-Wood Cemetery in Brooklyn.
