= Taylor Barracks (Kentucky) =

Coordinates: 38°14′01″N 85°45′26″W

During the American Civil War, Taylor Barracks was a military induction center in Louisville, Kentucky, for African-American troops, and after the war it was a United States Army base for both black and white troops during Reconstruction.

== Construction and use during Civil War ==
The wooden barracks were erected at Third and Oak streets on the southern outskirts of Louisville about a mile from Beargrass Creek, and were designed to house new volunteers for the Union Army. They were named for former President Zachary Taylor. Planning began in early 1864, and the barracks were constructed quickly, with several wooden frame, shingled buildings arranged in a square. Slaves who served with the Union received their freedom, but many slaves volunteered for the cause of ending slavery altogether. Recruits for the new regiments were transported from as far away as New York City and Boston. By late March, more than 100 men were arriving daily.

The facility grew to cover four city blocks, or 16 acres (65,000 m^{2}). Fresh water was provided by the nearby Ohio River, sent through city water pipes. The post also included a jail to house Union deserters, as well as a hospital and a reception hall. Other buildings included stables, quartermaster storehouses, kitchens, bakery, officer quarters, workshops, and a post library, as well as a small firehouse to shelter the post's fire engine. As with many Civil War posts located near marshy ground, disease was a constant threat, especially typhoid, cholera, dysentery, and rheumatism. Dead soldiers from Taylor Barracks were transported to Cave Hill Cemetery for burial.

== Later history ==
Colonel Oliver Hazard P. Cary was in charge of the barracks from early 1865 until September. Most significant activity ceased after June 1866, although the army kept the barracks open for several years to recruit and train Buffalo Soldiers and other black troops. During World War I, another military base south of Louisville was known as Camp Taylor; it was a major training facility for white troops as well.

== See also ==
- American Civil War fortifications in Louisville
- Louisville in the American Civil War

== Bibliography ==
- Bigham, Darrel E., On Jordan's Banks: Emancipation and Its Aftermath in the Ohio River Valley. University Press of Kentucky, 2006. ISBN 0-8131-2366-6.
- Indiana County History
- War Department, Surgeon General's Office, Report on Barracks and Hospitals, with Descriptions of Military Posts, Washington: Government Printing Office, 1870.
