= Severns Valley Baptist Church =

Baptist church in Elizabethtown, Kentucky, USA

Coordinates: 37.721°N 85.904°W

Severns Valley Baptist Church is a Baptist church located in Elizabethtown, Kentucky, USA. Founded by a group of eighteen people in June 1781, it was organized in Severns Valley (now Elizabethtown) and is Kentucky's oldest Baptist church. It has hosted events by performers such as Ricky Skaggs, The Crabb Family, pureNRG, Newsboys, and Vicky Courtney.
