= Central Hardin High School =

Public secondary school in Elizabethtown, Kentucky, United States

Coordinates: 37°40′32.18″N 85°54′25.06″W

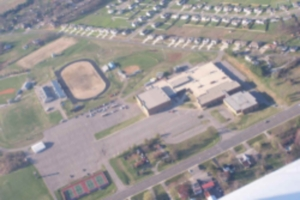

Location
- 3040 Leitchfield Road; Cecilia, KY 42724; United States

Information
- Type: Public
- Motto: We Are Central
- Established: c. 1990
- Principal: Kim Case
- Enrollment: 1,827 (2023-2024)
- Campus: Suburban
- Color
- Nickname: Bruins and Lady Bruins
- Feeder schools: East Hardin Middle School, West Hardin Middle School
- Website: www.hardin.k12.ky.us/chhs

Central Hardin High School is a school located in Elizabethtown, Kentucky, United States. Although the school is within the city limits, it is served by the post office of the community of Cecilia, much of which has recently been annexed by Elizabethtown. It is one of three county high schools in the Hardin County School System. The school is a school-based decision-making school. The council of twelve members including two administrators, six teachers, and four parents began operation in December 1995.

== History ==
Hardin Central Junior High was built and opened as a brand new school in 1976, Cletus Coats was the first principal. The name was reversed to Central Hardin and opened as a high school in fall of 1990. East and West Hardin High Schools became middle schools with their high school students going to the new Central Hardin High. Cletus Coats went to West to replace Dale Campbell who transferred to Central Hardin as Principal. Economy of the community is based on agriculture/farming, industry, service jobs, medical, small business and military. The community is served by Elizabethtown Community and Technical College. The community is very supportive of the school as 267 volunteers logged in 20,987 hours last year. The school is currently undergoing a huge renovation that will reimagine the entire school it started in 2023 and half of it is finished.

== 2008 tornado ==
During the early morning hours of February 6, 2008 a tornado ripped through the school, damaging the football field, freshman center, main gym, and main entrance.

== Athletics ==
- Girls' and boys' soccer
- Girls' and boys' basketball
- American football
- Baseball
- Girls' and boys' bowling
- Girls' and boys' swimming
- Girls' and boys' golf
- Girls' fast pitch softball
- Girls' and boys' tennis
- Girls' and boys' cross country
- Wrestling
- Girls' volleyball
- Girls' and boys' cheerleading
- Girls' and boys' marching band
- Girl's and boys' archery
