= Chaz Cardigan =

American musician

- Born: January 20, 1995 (age 31); Elizabethtown, Kentucky, United States
- Origin: Nashville, Tennessee
- Genres: Alternative rock; indie pop; indie rock; art rock
- Occupations: Singer; songwriter; musician; record producer
- Instruments: Vocals; guitar; piano; bass; drums; synthesizer
- Labels: Nvak Collective; Capitol Records; Loud Robot

Chaz Eugene McKinney (born January 20, 1995), known professionally as Chaz Cardigan, is an American singer and alternative rock artist based in Nashville, Tennessee, who describes his musical style as "pop songs with messy guitars." He is best known for his song "As I'll Ever Be", which was featured in the Netflix film To All the Boys: P.S. I Still Love You. His single "Not OK!" peaked at #18 on the Billboard Alternative Airplay Chart.

== Early life ==
Chaz Cardigan was born and raised in Elizabethtown, Kentucky. His father was an electrical contractor, his mother was a travel agent. He's described his childhood as "pretty midwestern", adding that he was "awkward", "twitchy", and unpopular for being perceived as "abrasive" and "politically outspoken" despite being very young. Growing up in a rural area, he used creativity as a child to stave off boredom by making toy inventions using "duct tape and shoestring" and writing screenplays. His earliest musical memories were of his older sister playing piano and listening to late-90's pop music such as Backstreet Boys, NSYNC, and Britney Spears.

"I thought that *NSYNC and Backstreet Boys was what “music” was, so I picked up piano and guitar to be like Justin Timberlake."

He became obsessed with making music after first hearing Queen’s “Bohemian Rhapsody”. At age 11, he bought a TASCAM four-track tape recorder and began teaching himself to produce and record, while playing in local punk rock bands. He would upload early demos to Myspace and mail cassette tapes to record labels in hopes of attracting attention and signing a record deal.

For most of his teen years, Cardigan commuted daily to Nashville to pursue his career as an artist while attending Elizabethtown High School. He was active in theater and his school's debate club. After graduating, he moved to Nashville to pursue music full-time rather than attend college. He has mentioned that he planned to study film in college.

Cardigan came out as queer early in life. Regarding that, he said: “I came out around the time I was 13. Which in Kentucky is not exactly a popular move. There was a lot of tension with students and parents and teachers around it, and that was an awkwardness I had to learn to navigate really early. Thankfully I had music as a way to cope.”

== Career ==
Cardigan made a living in Nashville working "every part-time job you can think of" and honing his production skills as a member of a hip hop collective called The Diatribe. In 2015 he was briefly homeless before moving in with members of a rock band called Safe Secrets and joining as a bass player for a short time. He released his first single under the moniker Spazz Cardigan in 2016 before releasing his debut LP I. The album was released independently on January 20, 2017. He was invited to perform at a string of unofficial South by Southwest showcases in 2017 following the album's release. Cardigan became a fixture of Nashville's blossoming local pop songwriting scene. He self-released a series of singles throughout 2018 that continually were placed on Spotify's New Music Friday editorial playlist. Within an 8-month span these songs accumulated 1 million streams. A quick rise in streaming numbers and a series of sold-out hometown shows attracted the attention of several record labels. Around this time he was commissioned by Google to create a series of instrumental songs for the YouTube Audio Library.

In 2019 he performed as an opener for Julia Michaels and The Band Camino, as well as playing his first festival dates that summer at SunFest and Forecastle Festival. He signed with Capitol Records at the beginning of that same year, becoming the first artist signed jointly to Capitol and Loud Robot (a subsidiary of J.J. Abrams' Bad Robot production company).

On October 22, 2020, he released his major-label debut EP, Vulnerabilia. Like his previous album, Cardigan self-produced and played all the instruments on Vulnerabilia. The title was imagined during a silent retreat at a monastery. The EP was preceded by the single "Not OK!", which became Cardigan's first radio single, and charted as a Top 20 Alternative song. Cardigan wrote the song in 2018, inspired by his experiences in therapy, and describes that time of his life as "a really heavy season of self-inventory."

That summer he became a fixture on the short-form video app TikTok for a series of political comedy songs, one of which was reposted by Jonathan Van Ness. During the COVID-19 pandemic, Chaz released a series of singles leading up to his second EP for Capitol, Holograma. The project was promoted by a series of animated music videos created using photogrammetry.

Cardigan also writes and releases a weekly web-series called Wild World, condensing history, science, and philosophy ideas into 60-second episodes.

In 2021, Variety reported that Cardigan was an inaugural signee of an indierecord label Nvak Collective. He released "we Look So Good" through Nvak Collective on September 17, 2021.

Cardigan is the composer and lyricist for the new musical, The Brass Teapot, based on the 2012 independent film of the same name.

== Influences ==
Cardigan's music draws from a wide range of influences including Imogen Heap, David Bowie, The Beatles, Sufjan Stevens, Peter Gabriel, Kanye West, Third Eye Blind, Nirvana, Talking Heads, Gorillaz, Björk, The 1975, Kevin Gates, Sun Ra, Stevie Wonder, and Prince.

Cardigan's dream collaborations include Jon Bellion, Norah Jones, and Lil Yachty.

== Name ==
Chaz has stated that the name Spazz Cardigan was a reaction to being called "spaz" in childhood.

"It was a nickname that stuck around the family, and particularly around school. A lot of people knew me as Spazz before they knew my actual name… I’d been sorting names for months, and it just popped into my head. I asked my roommate at the time, ‘Have you heard of Spazz Cardigan?’ He says, ‘no, who’s that? What’s he done?’ And I knew — that’s the one! It sounds like a name."

After becoming aware that the name was considered derogatory in much of the world, he resorted instead to using his birth name.

== Reception ==
In 2020 Billboard wrote that Cardigan was "known for his soulful, strong singing voice and genre-bending brand of music – a mix of folk, R&B, and modern pop", calling him a "certified 21st century pop artist, unafraid to mix sounds as he sees fit." Alternative Addiction praised "vocal diversity" and his "ability to write a catchy song". The Nashville Scene noted that "he writes songs grounded in compassion and honesty, often grappling frankly with mental health". MTV has said "It’s hard to place Chaz Cardigan into any one box, and that’s almost certainly the way he prefers it."

He's been publicly vocal about climate change, mental health, gun control, and LGBT equality. The Advocate called him "an alt-rocker for a new, angsty generation, making space for himself in a genre in which LGBTQ musicians aren’t often seen."

== Discography ==
=== EPs ===
- Vulnerabilia (2020)
- Holograma (2020)

=== Studio albums ===
- I (2017)
- A Year in Glassland (2024)

=== Singles ===
- "iDeologue" (2016)
- "Episode" (2018)
- "Medicine" (2018)
- "Over" (2018)
- "DOIDOIT" (2018)
- "Not OK!" (2020)
- "As I'll Ever Be (2020)
- "S.O.S." (2020)
- "Everything's Wrong" (2020)
- "Middle Of the Road" (2020)
- "Live A Little" (2020)
- "Room" (2020)
- "Losing Touch" (2020)
- "Haircut" (2020)
- "We Look So Good" (2021)
- "Pictures" (2021)
- "Rockwell" (2022)
- "Grass/Blame" (2023)
- "Roshomon" (2023)
- "It's Gonna Be Great (Hallelujah)" (2023)
- "Oakblood" (2023)
- "Poison Ivy" (2023)
- "Used to Care" (2024)
