= Vulnerabilia =

EP by Chaz Cardigan
- Released: February 13, 2020
- Recorded: 2018
- Genre: Alternative; Indie rock
- Length: 17:00
- Label: Capitol; Loud Robot
- Producer: Chaz Cardigan; Jamie Lidell

Singles from Vulnerabilia
- 1. "Not OK!" Released: January 23, 2020

Vulnerabilia is the debut EP by American singer Chaz Cardigan. It was released on February 13, 2020 through Capitol Records and Loud Robot (a subsidiary of J. J. Abrams's Bad Robot production company).

== Background ==
Cardigan self-released a series of singles throughout 2018 that continually were placed on Spotify's New Music Friday editorial playlist. Within an 8-month span these songs accumulated 1 million streams. A quick rise in streaming numbers and a series of sold-out hometown shows attracted the attention of several record labels. On the writing of Vulnerabilia, he's said:

"It’s wild, actually: as a Pop music scene started forming in Nashville, every writer in town that didn’t work on country music sort of got thrown under that umbrella. My background is more rock and indie stuff, and I was suddenly working in rooms with electronic producers, which was a really cool creative period — I got some really cool songs from that year and I was just excited to put them out even if they were a little more electronic-sounding than I was really focusing on. So everything that felt a little more immediate I put out as a single, and everything that felt more like a body of work I kept and worked on together. Through ’18 I would test songs out by slipping them in and out of set lists at my shows, and the EP became whatever resonated the most on stage."

He's commented that the title was imagined after a silent retreat at a monastery, and that it means "a collection of personal moments".

Like his previous work, Cardigan self-produced and played every instrument on the EP. It was completed before Cardigan was signed to Capitol Records, and at one point was planned as an independent release. The EP was preceded by the lead single "Not OK!", Cardigan's first song to receive radio play.

Prior to the COVID-19 pandemic, the EP was announced alongside tour dates with Cardigan's label mate Barns Courtney.

== Track listing ==
No.	Title	Writer(s)	Length
1.	"Not OK!"	Chaz Cardigan • Todd Clark	3:12
2.	"Being Human"	Cardigan • Kenny Fleetwood	3:30
3.	"Tightrope"	Cardigan • Joseph Ryan Creamer	3:55
4.	"Throwing Punches"	Cardigan • John Luke Carter	3:17
5.	"Passinthru"	Cardigan • Creamer	3:05

== Personnel ==
- Chaz Cardigan - production, all instruments
- Jamie Lidell - additional production, engineering
- Jon Kaplan - mixing
