= Elizabethtown, Kentucky =

- City
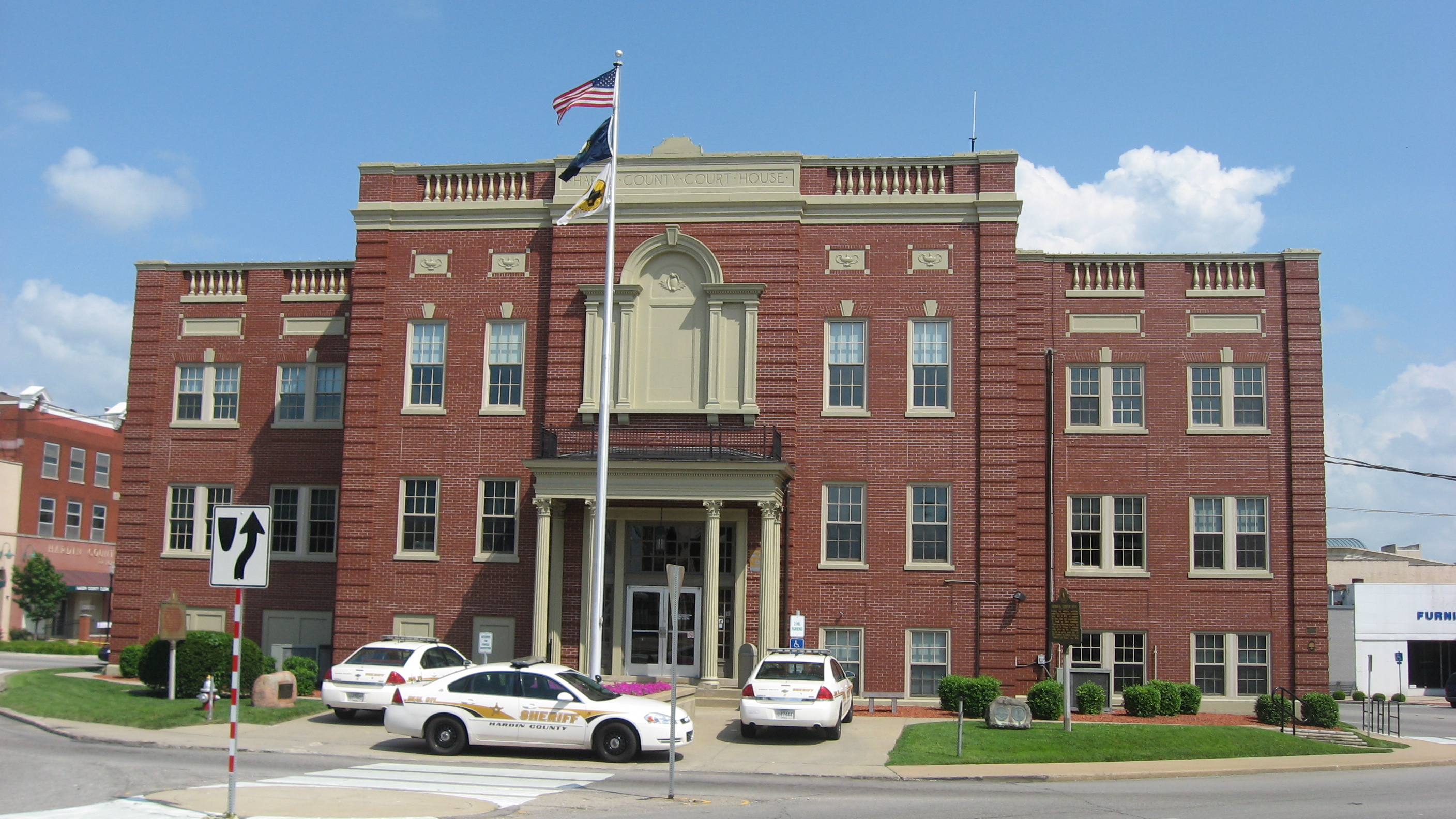
- Hardin County Old Courthouse in downtown Elizabethtown

- Flag Seal
- Nickname: E-town or E'town
- Interactive map of Elizabethtown, Kentucky
- Location within Kentucky Location within the United States
- Coordinates: 37°42′N 85°52′W
- Country: United States
- State: Kentucky
- County: Hardin

Area
  - Total: 27.99 sq mi (72.49 km^{2})
  - Land: 27.50 sq mi (71.22 km^{2})
  - Water: 0.49 sq mi (1.27 km^{2})
- Elevation: 725 ft (221 m)

Population (2020)
  - Total: 31,394
  - Estimate (2022): 31,892
  - Density: 1,141.7/sq mi (440.81/km^{2})
- Time zone: UTC−5 (Eastern (EST))
  - Summer (DST): UTC−4 (EDT)
- ZIP codes: 42701–42702
- Area codes: 270 & 364
- FIPS code: 21-24274
- GNIS feature ID: 0491640
- Website: elizabethtownky.org

Elizabethtown is a city in Hardin County, Kentucky, United States, and its county seat. The population was 31,394 at the 2020 census, making it the ninth-most populous city in the state. It is the principal city of the Elizabethtown metropolitan area, which is included in the Louisville/Jefferson County–Elizabethtown–Madison, Kentucky-Indiana combined statistical area. The Elizabethtown metropolitan area had a population of 125,569 in 2020. Elizabethtown is a home-rule class city under Kentucky law.

== History ==
Established in 1793, Hardin County was named for Colonel John Hardin, an Indian fighter who worked with tribes in the local area. In a few years, professional men and tradesmen came to live in the area. In 1793, Colonel Andrew Hynes had 30 acres (12 ha) (until then known as the "Severn's Valley Settlement") surveyed and laid off into lots and streets to establish Elizabethtown. Named in honor of his wife, Elizabethtown was legally established in 1797.

Thomas Lincoln helped Samuel Haycraft build a millrace at Haycraft's mill on Valley Creek. After Lincoln married Nancy Hanks in 1806, they lived in a log cabin built in Elizabethtown. Their daughter, Sarah, was born there in 1807. Soon after, they moved to the Sinking Spring Farm, where Abraham Lincoln was born in 1809. Thomas Lincoln took his family to Indiana in 1816. After his wife died in 1818, he returned to Elizabethtown and married Sarah Bush Johnston, widowed since 1816. She and her three children accompanied Thomas back to Indiana, where Sarah was stepmother to Thomas' two children.

On March 5, 1850, the Commonwealth of Kentucky granted a charter to the Louisville and Nashville Railroad Company authorizing it to raise funds and built a railroad from Louisville to the Tennessee state line in the direction of Nashville. John L. Helm, the grandson of Capt. Thomas Helm, became the president of the railroad in October 1854; he directed construction of the main stem of the rail line through Elizabethtown. The rail line was completed to Elizabethtown in 1858, with the first train arriving on June 15, 1858. The opening of the railroad brought economic growth to Elizabethtown, which became an important trade center along the railroad and a strategic point during the Civil War.

On December 27, 1862, Confederate General John Hunt Morgan and his 3,000-man cavalry attacked Elizabethtown. During the battle, more than 100 cannonballs were fired into the town. Although he successfully captured Elizabethtown, Morgan's chief goal was to disrupt the railroad and northern transportation. He proceeded north along the railroad, burning trestles and destroying sections of the track. After the battle, one cannonball was found lodged in the side of a building on the public square. After the building burned in 1887 and was rebuilt, the cannonball was replaced in the side wall, as close to its original site as possible, where it remains in the present day. It is located in the Joey Lee building, which is located on the historic town square. The building is currently owned and houses the office of attorney Roger T. Rigney, it also features a placard noting the cannonball and the history behind it out front.

From 1871 to 1873 during the Reconstruction Era, the Seventh Cavalry and a battalion of the Fourth Infantry, led by General George Armstrong Custer, were stationed in Elizabethtown. The military were assigned to suppress the local Ku Klux Klan under the Enforcement Acts, as their members had been attacking freedmen and other Republicans. They also broke up illegal distilleries, which began to flourish in the South after the Civil War. General Custer and his wife Elizabeth lived in a small cottage behind Aunt Beck Hill's boarding house, now known as the Brown-Pusey House.

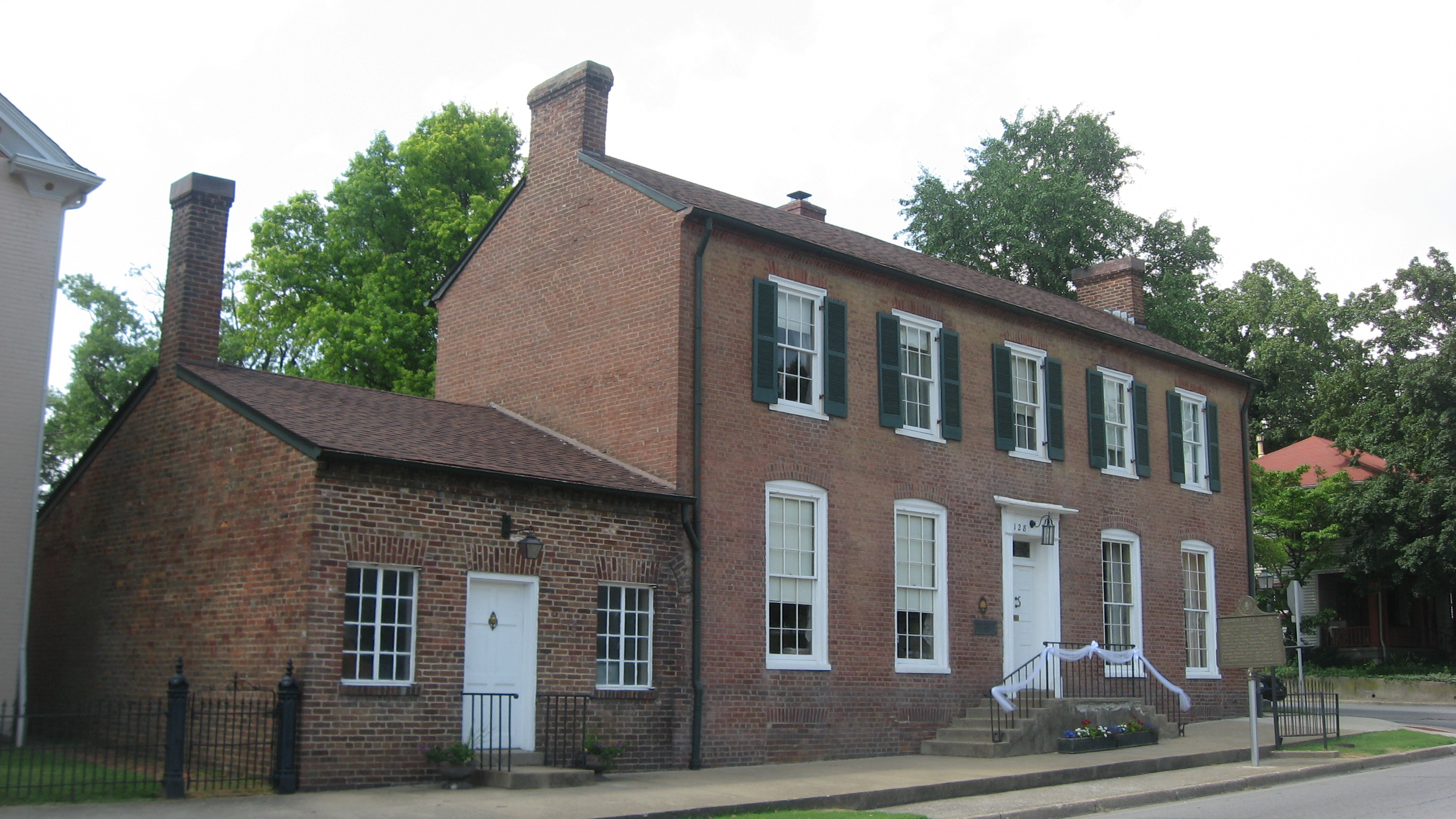
The Brown Pusey House

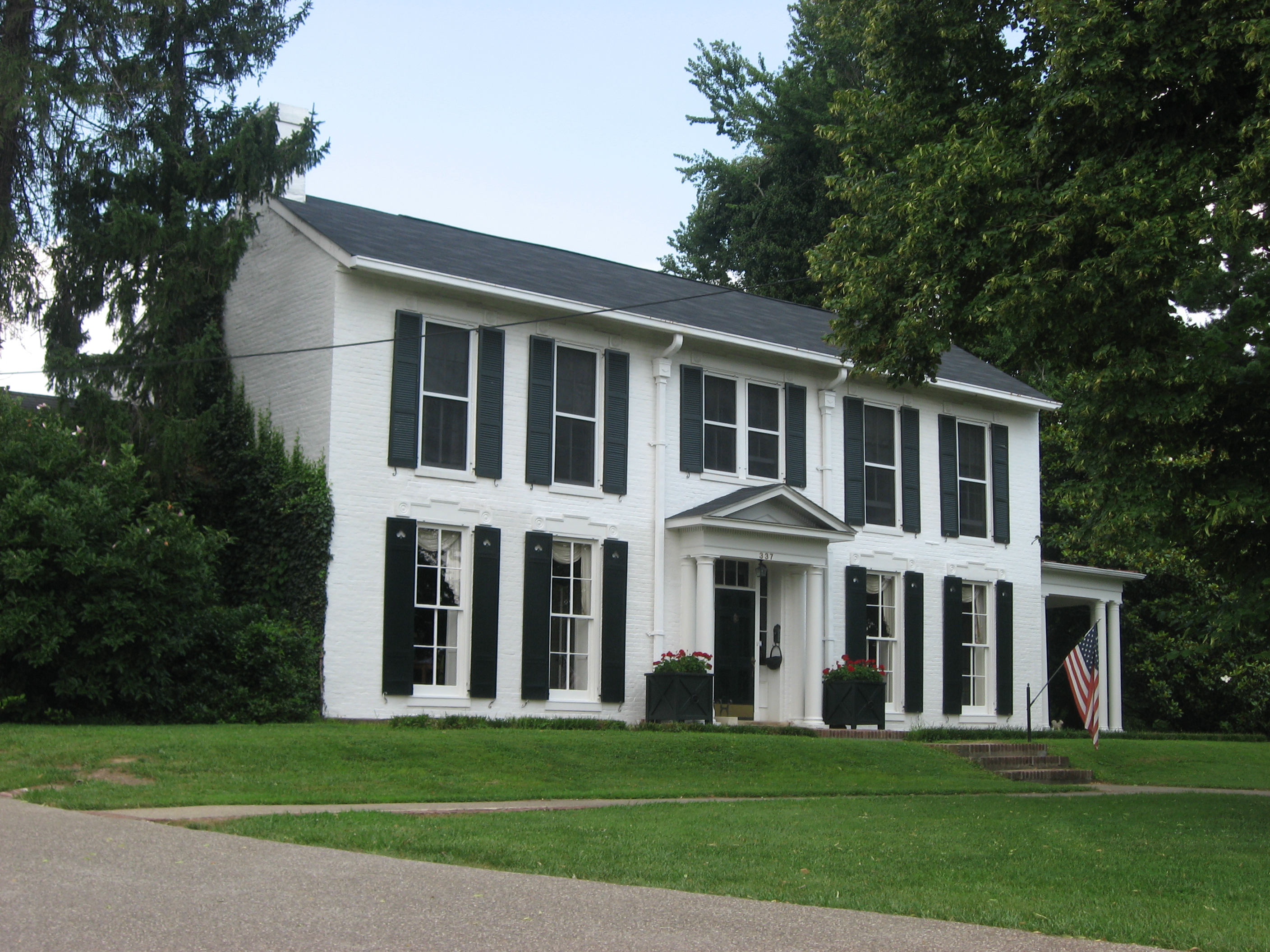
The Samuel B. Thomas House

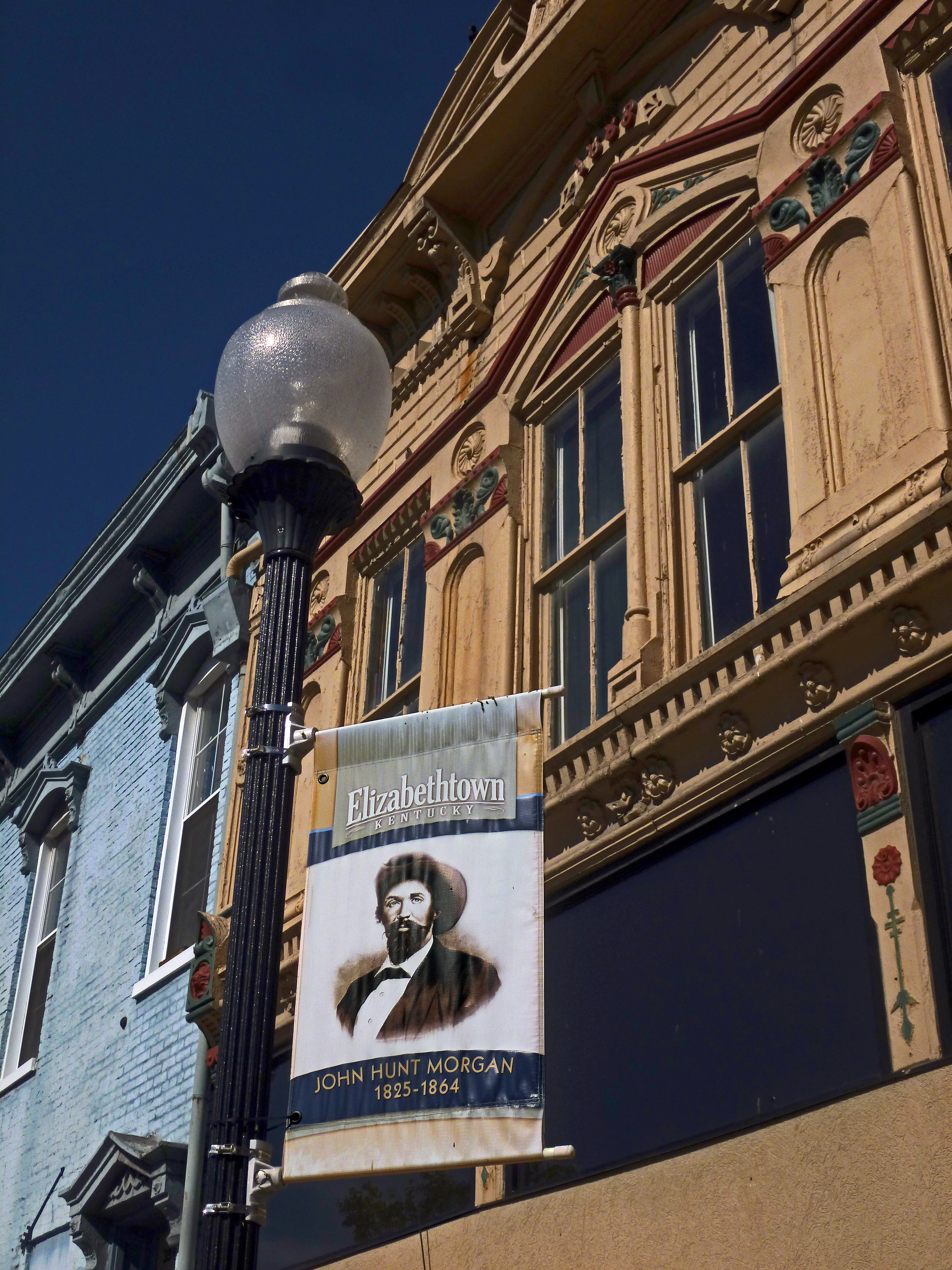
A banner remembers John Hunt Morgan's role in the history of Elizabethtown, KY. A Confederate cannonball is embedded in the blue building at left (the ball is visible just below and to the left of the nearest second-story window).

== Geography ==
Elizabethtown is in east-central Hardin County, about 15 miles (24 km) south of Fort Knox. Interstate 65 passes through the southeast side of the city, leading north-northeast 30 miles (48 km) to Louisville and southwest 80 miles (130 km) to Bowling Green. The Western Kentucky Parkway starts at I-65 in Elizabethtown and leads west 138 miles (222 km) to Eddyville. To the east, the Bluegrass Parkway leads 105 miles (169 km) to Lexington.

According to the United States Census Bureau, Elizabethtown has a total area of 25.8 square miles (67 km^{2}), of which 25.4 square miles (66 km^{2}) is land and 0.5 square miles (1 km^{2}) (1.77%) is water.

The Elizabethtown–Fort Knox metropolitan area consists of Hardin, Meade, and Larue counties, and includes Radcliff, a city about three-fourths the size of Elizabethtown; the housing areas of the Fort Knox Military Installation; the unincorporated town of Rineyville; and other communities such as Vine Grove, Glendale, Sonora, West Point, and Upton.

=== Climate ===
The climate in this area is characterized by hot, humid summers and generally mild to cool winters. According to the Köppen Climate Classification system, Elizabethtown has a humid subtropical climate, abbreviated "Cfa" on climate maps.

== Demographics ==
Historical population
Census	Pop.	Note	%±
1810	181		—
1830	601		—
1840	979		62.9%
1860	556		—
1870	1,743		213.5%
1880	2,526		44.9%
1890	2,260		−10.5%
1900	1,861		−17.7%
1910	1,970		5.9%
1920	2,530		28.4%
1930	2,590		2.4%
1940	3,667		41.6%
1950	5,807		58.4%
1960	9,641		66.0%
1970	11,748		21.9%
1980	15,380		30.9%
1990	18,167		18.1%
2000	22,542		24.1%
2010	28,531		26.6%
2020	31,394		10.0%
2025 (est.)	35,448		12.9%

=== 2020 census ===
As of the 2020 census, Elizabethtown had a population of 31,394. The median age was 37.7 years. 23.0% of residents were under the age of 18 and 16.2% of residents were 65 years of age or older. For every 100 females there were 91.7 males, and for every 100 females age 18 and over there were 87.9 males age 18 and over.

99.3% of residents lived in urban areas, while 0.7% lived in rural areas.

There were 13,095 households in Elizabethtown, of which 29.7% had children under the age of 18 living in them. Of all households, 38.6% were married-couple households, 19.0% were households with a male householder and no spouse or partner present, and 34.4% were households with a female householder and no spouse or partner present. About 34.2% of all households were made up of individuals and 13.1% had someone living alone who was 65 years of age or older.

There were 14,076 housing units, of which 7.0% were vacant. The homeowner vacancy rate was 2.4% and the rental vacancy rate was 6.1%.

Racial composition as of the 2020 census
Race	Number	Percent
White	23,514	74.9%
Black or African American	3,625	11.5%
American Indian and Alaska Native	134	0.4%
Asian	881	2.8%
Native Hawaiian and Other Pacific Islander	65	0.2%
Some other race	593	1.9%
Two or more races	2,582	8.2%
Hispanic or Latino (of any race)	1,730	5.5%

=== 2010 census ===
As of the census of 2010, there were 28,531 people, 15,711 households, and 9,345 families residing in the city. The population density was 936.6/mi^{2} (361.6/km^{2}). There were 12,664 housing units at an average density of 490.5/mi^{2} (189.4/km^{2}). The racial makeup of the city was 80.4% White (78.1% non-Hispanic), 19.6% African American, 0.34% Native American or Alaska Native, 2.6% Asian, 0.18% Pacific Islander, 1.3% from other races, and 3.4% from two or more races. Hispanics or Latinos of any race were 4.3% of the population.

There were 15,711 households, out of which 30.5% had children under the age of 18 living with them, 43.2% were married couples living together, 15.1% had a female householder with no husband present, 4.4% had a male householder with no wife present, and 37.3% were non-families. 32.1% of all households were made up of individuals, and 10.9% had someone living alone who was 65 years of age or older. The average household size was 2.34 and the average family size was 2.94.

The age distribution was 25.1% under 18, 9.8% from 18 to 24, 27.5% from 25 to 44, 24.4% from 45 to 64, and 13.2% who were 65 or older. The median age was 35.4 years. For every 100 females, there were 91.9 males. For every 100 females age 18 and over, there were 87.4 males.

Full economic data for Kentucky locations from the 2010 Census has not yet been released. As of the 2010 Census, median income for a household in the city was $40,720, and the median income for a family was $54,699. Full-time male workers had a median income of $43,406 versus $30,310 for females. The per capita income for the city was $23,627.

=== 2000 census ===
As of the 2000 Census, about 8.5% of families and 10.5% of the population were below the poverty line, including 14.6% of those under age 18 and 9.1% of those age 65 or over.

=== Metropolitan area ===
In 2000, Kentucky counties Hardin and LaRue were defined as the Elizabethtown, KY Metropolitan Statistical Area by the Bureau of the Census; the name of the region was changed in 2013 to Elizabethtown–Fort Knox, KY Metropolitan Statistical Area. It is part of the Louisville–Elizabethtown–Bardstown, KY-IN Combined Statistical Area.

=== Churches ===
The first Baptist settlement west of the Allegheny Mountains was in Elizabethtown at Severns Valley Baptist Church, named after the original name of Elizabethtown. Catholics came west from Nelson County and settled at Colesburg at St. Clare Parish before coming to St. James Parish in Elizabethtown. Lucinda Helm helped bring United Methodists into Elizabethtown, and they immortalized her in naming the Helm Memorial United Methodist Church, today simply called MUMC. More than 12 denominations are represented by over 100 churches in Elizabethtown.

=== Tribal community ===
The Nolin River Band of Saponi (also known as the Nolin River Indian Community) has a large number of its members living within the city limits. The city recognized the band in September 2025.

== Economy ==
In May 2021, Kruger Packaging, announced plans to build a new $114 million, and its first corrugated-box manufacturing plant in the U.S., a 400,000 square-foot packaging facility in Elizabethtown, the project was expected to create approximately 150 jobs, located in T.J. Patterson Industrial Park, with opening planned for late 2022. In September 2026, it was announced that Kruger Packaging is adding a new converting line at its Elizabethtown plant, increasing production capacity by approximately 25%.

== Culture ==
The town is regionally referred to as "E-town". It is one of two larger towns (the other being Bowling Green, Kentucky) along I-65 between Louisville and Nashville.

The movie Elizabethtown (2005) is named after the town and was said to take place there, although many scenes were filmed in filmed in Versailles and around Kentucky.

=== Alcohol sales ===
Elizabethtown is officially classified by the Kentucky Department of Alcoholic Beverage Control (ABC) as being in a "moist county". Under ABC terminology, "moist" indicates that at least one city within a county has approved packaged alcohol sales. In popular usage, the term "moist" more often refers to the city's former status as allowing by-the-drink sales in restaurants, but not package sales.

Despite the county being a dry county, alcoholic drink sales have long been allowed in restaurants seating at least 100 diners and deriving at least 70% of their total sales from food. Beer, wine and spirits can be purchased at licensed liquor stores, drug stores and grocery outlets, beer can be purchased at most convenience stores . The locals classify this as a "damp" or "moist" county. In 2011, the residents of Elizabethtown, Radcliff, and Vine Grove voted to allow properly licensed businesses to sell package liquor, wine, and beer.

== Transportation ==
The city is served by the Elizabethtown Regional Airport (EKX), and the Elizabethtown Airport Board was as of 2013 exploring options to bring commercial services to the city.

== Education ==
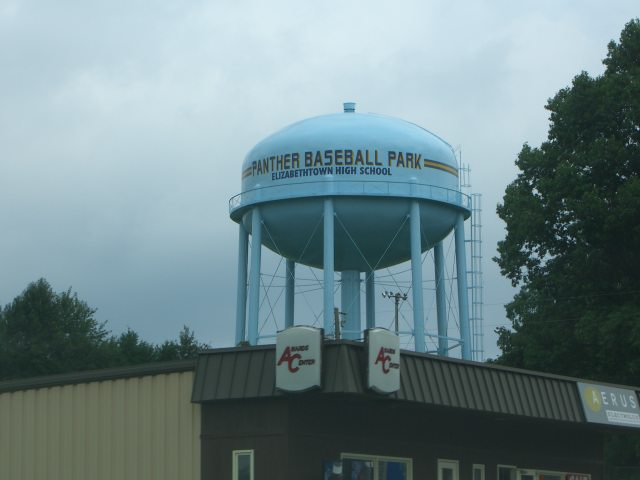
Water tower near Panther Baseball Park in Elizabethtown

=== Elizabethtown Independent Schools ===
Elizabethtown Independent Schools operates:

- Elizabethtown High School
- T.K. Stone Middle School
- Morningside Elementary School
- Helmwood Heights Elementary School
- Valley View Educational Center

=== Hardin County Schools ===
The Hardin County Schools (HCS) are another district that encompasses some of the city limits.

Here are the schools located within the city limits:

- Bluegrass Middle School
- Central Hardin High School
- G.C. Burkhead Elementary School
- Heartland Elementary School
- Lincoln Trail Elementary School
- New Highland Elementary School

Although New Highland Elementary, Bluegrass Middle School, and John Hardin High School have an Elizabethtown mailing address, and some Elizabethtown residents are zoned into those schools, they are actually within the city limits of neighboring Radcliff. Similarly, the HCS headquarters is located in Radcliff but served by the Elizabethtown post office. Conversely, Central Hardin High is within the city limits of Elizabethtown but has a mailing address of Cecilia.

=== Private schools ===
- Saint James Catholic Regional School
- Gloria Dei Lutheran School

=== Post-secondary education ===
Elizabethtown is home to Elizabethtown Community and Technical College, a member of the Kentucky Community and Technical College System, as well as Empire Beauty School formerly the Hair Design School on Westport Road. Also, Western Kentucky University has a regional campus located on post at Fort Knox and in a building that is shared with ECTC in Elizabethtown.

The Elizabethtown Japanese School (エリザベスタウン日本人補習校 Erizabesutaun Nihonjin Hoshūkō), a weekend Japanese program, holds its classes at the Elizabethtown Community and Technical College.

=== Public library ===
Elizabethtown has a lending library, a branch of the Hardin County Public Library.

== Notable people ==
- Nathan Adcock, MLB pitcher for the Kansas City Royals
- Philip Arnold, confidence trickster, most famous for the diamond hoax of 1872
- Antwain Barbour, professional basketball player and former member of the Kentucky Wildcats men's basketball team.
- Ben M. Bogard, clergyman, founder of the American Baptist Association, born in Elizabethtown in 1868
- Mark Bradley, outfielder for the New York Mets and Los Angeles Dodgers from 1981 to 1983
- John Y. Brown, 31st Governor of Kentucky and former Representative of Kentucky's 2nd district (1873–1877) & 5th district (1859–1861)
- Chaz Cardigan, Alternative rock musician
- Frank Chelf, United States representative from Kentucky
- David Dao, doctor, passenger notable for being dragged off United Airlines Flight 3411
- Brandon Deaderick, NFL defensive tackle drafted by the New England Patriots and currently plays for the Jacksonville Jaguars
- Steve Delabar, MLB relief pitcher for the Toronto Blue Jays
- Greg Downs, award-winning author
- Daniel Cameron, 51st Attorney General of Kentucky
- Sarah Lincoln Grigsby, sister of Abraham Lincoln; born in Elizabethtown
- Benjamin Hardin Helm, brigadier general, Confederate States Army
- John LaRue Helm, 18th and 24th Governor of Kentucky
- Walter Dee Huddleston, U.S. Senator from 1973 to 1985
- Andrew Hynes, founder of Elizabethtown, which he named after his wife
- Steve Jameson, award-winning painter and children's book illustrator
- Joshua Jewett, former Representative of the 5th district, (1855–1859)
- Keen Johnson, 45th Governor of Kentucky
- Sarah Bush Johnston, second wife of Thomas Lincoln and stepmother to President Abraham Lincoln
- Jimmie Lee, member of the Kentucky House of Representatives representing District 25
- Thomas Lincoln, father of President Abraham Lincoln
- Usher F. Linder, Illinois Attorney General
- Danny Lloyd, actor in The Shining
- Charles B. Middleton, stage and film actor, famous for his role as Ming the Merciless in the Flash Gordon movie serials
- Daniel Martin Moore, singer-songwriter; born in Elizabethtown
- Elizabeth Helm Nitchie, educator, expert on lip reading, born in Elizabethtown
- Dennis Parrett, member of the Kentucky Senate representing District 10
- Kenny Perry, professional PGA Tour golfer
- Todd Perry, former NFL offensive guard for the Chicago Bears and Miami Dolphins
- Steffphon Pettigrew, professional basketball player
- Kelly Rutherford, television and film actress, famous for her roles on Generations, Melrose Place, Gossip Girl and The Adventures of Brisco County, Jr.
- Chris Todd, Auburn Tigers quarterback

== Sister cities ==
Elizabethtown has one sister city, as designated by Sister Cities International:

Koori, Fukushima, Japan
