= Not OK! =

2020 song by Chaz Cardigan

Single by Chaz Cardigan

from the EP Vulnerabilia
- Released: January 23, 2020
- Genre: Alternative; indie rock
- Length: 3:12
- Label: Capitol; Loud Robot
- Songwriters: Chaz Cardigan; Todd Clark
- Producers: Chaz Cardigan; Jamie Lidell

Chaz Cardigan singles chronology
"As I'll Ever Be" (2020)	"Not OK!" (2020)	"S.O.S." (2020)

"Not OK!" is a song by American alternative artist Chaz Cardigan. The song was recorded for Cardigan's debut EP, Vulnerabilia, and served as its lead single.

== Background ==
"Not OK!" was written by Chaz Cardigan and Todd Clark in 2018. Cardigan has explained that the song was written after he'd started regularly attending Jungian therapy. “I was in this really intense place of picking apart some of my bad habits, the walls I felt like I kept coming up against," he says. "So instead of feeling down on myself or feeling guilty for these things in my life I didn't like, I would think, why am I this way? And then in that unpacking, realizing that, actually, no one knows what we're doing. There's no magical level you get to in life where it all starts to make sense. So why pretend that we're put together? That’s what it’s about for me.”

== Music videos ==
The single was originally accompanied by an official video directed by Al Kalyk. The video featured Cardigan in a bathtub full of gummy bears. After the start of the COVID-19 pandemic, a "quarantine edition" video was released, directed by Will Kindrick. The re-imagined video featured footage of Cardigan, his band, and fans shot entirely on mobile phone cameras.

== Charts ==
Chart (2020)	Peak position
US Alternative Airplay (Billboard)	18
US Rock Airplay (Billboard)	40
