= West Point Independent School District =

Defunct school district in Kentucky, US

West Point Independent School District was a PreK-8 school district headquartered in West Point, Kentucky. It operated one school, West Point Independent School, with Elizabethtown High School being the main feeder high school.

In 1804 the school was established. Circa 2002 the school had 180 students.

In 2019 Wayne Lewis, the Kentucky Commissioner of Education, argued that he had "major concerns" on whether the district can continue to operate. In July 2019 the district was exploring whether to merge with Hardin County Schools, which would change the assigned high school of the territory to North Hardin High School.

On January 28, 2020, the West Point school board, in what Louisville TV station WDRB called "an emotional meeting", voted unanimously to begin merger negotiations with the Hardin County district. At the time, the West Point district had fewer than 150 students, with enrollment continuing to decline. This decline led to long-term reductions in state funding; despite some of the highest school taxes in the state, at $1.07 per $100 assessed value, the district considered itself unable to generate enough revenue to remain in operation.

Both school boards agreed to the merger the following month, with the West Point district approving it on February 18 and the Hardin County board following two days later. The merger officially took effect on July 1, 2020. West Point students who were attending Elizabethtown High at that time could finish their high school education there, with future West Point students attending North Hardin High.
