= Bowling Green Independent School District =

School district in Kentucky, United States

Address
- 1211 Center Street Bowling Green, Kentucky, 42101; United States

District information
- Type: Public
- Grades: PreK–12
- NCES District ID: 2100570

Students and staff
- Students: 4,151
- Teachers: 267.97
- Staff: 328.0
- Student–teacher ratio: 15.49

Other information
- Website: www.bgreen.kyschools.us

Bowling Green Independent School District (BGISD) is a school district headquartered in Bowling Green, Kentucky. It includes inner portions of Bowling Green, while outer portions are in Warren County Public Schools.

== History ==
It was created in the 1880s.

Gary Fields was named superintendent in 2015. He expressed support for Kentucky House Bill 563.

=== Schools ===
High schools

- Bowling Green High School
- Eleventh Street Alternative School

Junior high schools

- Bowling Green Junior High School

Elementary schools

- Dishman McGinnis
- Parker Bennett Curry
- Potter Gray
- T. C. Cherry
- W. R. McNeill
