= Hardin County Schools =

School district in Hardin County, Kentucky, United States

Hardin County Schools (HCS) is an American school district headquartered in a portion of Radcliff, Kentucky that has an Elizabethtown mailing address. It serves most of Hardin County. However areas in Elizabethtown are instead zoned to Elizabethtown Independent School District. Additionally Fort Knox residents are zoned to Department of Defense Education Activity (DoDEA) schools.

== History ==
In 2020 the county school district absorbed the former West Point Independent School District.

== Schools ==
=== Middle-high schools ===
- College View Campus

=== High schools ===
- Central Hardin High School
- John Hardin High School
- North Hardin High School
- Hardin County Schools Early College and Career Center

=== Middle schools ===
- Bluegrass Middle School
- East Hardin Middle School
- J. T. Alton Middle School
- North Middle School
- West Hardin Middle School

=== Elementary schools ===
- Cecilia Valley Elementary School
- Creekside Elementary School
- G. C. Burkhead Elementary School
- Heartland Elementary School
- Lakewood Elementary School
- Lincoln Trail Elementary School
- Meadow View Elementary School
- New Highland Elementary School
- North Park Elementary School
- Radcliff Elementary School
- Rineyville Elementary School
- Vine Grove Elementary School
- Woodland Elementary School

== See also ==
Others in the county:

- Elizabethtown Independent Schools
- West Point Independent School District, which closed at the end of the 2019–20 school year and merged into HCS
