= North Hardin High School =

Location
- 801 South Logsdon Parkway; Radcliff, Kentucky 40160; United States; 37°49′31″N 85°56′53″W

Information
- Type: Public secondary school
- Established: 1962
- School district: Hardin County Public Schools
- Principal: Jeff Masey
- Teaching staff: 80.93 (FTE)
- Grades: 9–12
- Enrollment: 1,664 (2023-2024)
- Student to teacher ratio: 20.56
- Colors: Royal blue and white
- Nickname: Trojans
- Accreditation: Cognia
- Yearbook: The Trojan
- Website: www.hardin.k12.ky.us/nhhs

North Hardin High School, located in Radcliff, Kentucky, United States, has a student population of approximately 1,600. The school, a part of Hardin County Public Schools, was founded in 1962. The athletics teams are known as the Trojans. The school is also known for its involvement in the 1988 Carrollton bus disaster, which resulted in improvements to the safety of school buses and DUI laws

== Academics ==
North Hardin has been accredited by Cognia (or its predecessors) since 1982.

== Notable alumni ==
- Nathan Adcock (class of 2006), major league baseball player, 2011, Kansas City Royals, right-handed pitcher
- Dana Canedy (class of 1983), author of the best-selling memoir A Journal for Jordan and Pulitzer Prize-winning journalist for the New York Times
- Todd Perry (class of 1988), NFL football player from 1993 to 2003 with the Chicago Bears and the Miami Dolphins
- Howard Stidham, NFL football player
- Andre' Woodson (class of 2003), starting quarterback for University of Kentucky 2005–07; assistant football coach at UK
