= List of public schools in Louisville, Kentucky =

There are more than 145 public schools in Louisville, Kentucky, servicing nearly 100,000 students in kindergarten through 12th grade (K–12) education. The primary public education provider is Jefferson County Public Schools (JCPS).

Schools are typically categorized as elementary, middle or high schools, though some exceptions exist. J. Graham Brown School offers education for all grades in one school. Moore Traditional School is a combined middle and high school (formerly two separate schools). The Anchorage School is the sole school of AISD, educating for grades K-8.

== Elementary schools ==
Public elementary schools provide education through fifth grade (approx. age 11, depending on the student). Some elementary schools offer pre-kindergarten programs.

| Picture | School name | Opening date | Origin of name and other information |
|---|---|---|---|
| | Atkinson Elementary School | 1902 | Joseph B. Atkinson, longtime city school board member. |
| | Auburndale Elementary School | 1924 | Located in Auburndale neighborhood. |
| | Audubon Traditional Elementary School | 1954 | John J. Audubon, painter and bird enthusiast. |
| | Bates Elementary School | 1955 | James H. Bates, longtime chairman of the Jefferson County Board of Education. Home of Safety City (a miniaturized city with 'go-cart' automobiles designed to teach students safe habits). |
| | Blake Elementary School | 1970 | |
| | Bloom Elementary School (originally Enterprise) | 1896 | I.N. Bloom; physician, City of Louisville Board of Education member 1911–1922, and first board president. |
| | Blue Lick Elementary School | 1966 | Located on Blue Lick Road. |
| | Bowen Elementary School | 1969 | Known as "The greatest school on earth". |
| | Albert S. Brandeis Elementary School | 1913 | Albert S. Brandeis. |
| | Breckinridge-Franklin Elementary School | 1999 | Merger of John C. Breckinridge Elementary and Benjamin Franklin Elementary School in 2000. |
| | Byck Elementary School | 1961 | Dann Conrad Byck, member of the Louisville Board of Aldermen and member of the City of Louisville Board of Education 1955–1959. |
| | Camp Taylor Elementary School | 1917 | Located in Camp Taylor neighborhood, site of Camp Zachary Taylor 1917–1921. |
| | Cane Run Elementary School | 1832 | Located on Cane Run Road. The school was originally housed in a log cabin, and may have had as many of seven different buildings. Present building constructed in 1972. |
| | Carter Traditional School | 1918 | Jessie R. Carter. |
| | Chancey Elementary School | 2002 | Malcom B. Chancey, local business leader who established the Jefferson County Public Education Foundation. |
| | Chenoweth Elementary School | 1954 | Located near Chenoweth Lane. |
| | Cochran Elementary School | 1900 | Gavin H. Cochran. |
| | Cochrane Elementary School | 1968 | Garland S. Cochrane. |
| | Coleridge-Taylor Montessori Elementary School | 1969 | Composer Samuel Coleridge-Taylor. |
| | Coral Ridge Elementary School | 1971 | Located in the Coral Ridge neighborhood. |
| | Crums Lane Elementary School | 1962 | Located on Crums Lane. |
| | Dixie Elementary School | 1960 | Located behind Valley Traditional High School, on Dixie Highway. |
| | Dunn Elementary School | 1972 | |
| | Eisenhower Elementary School | 1972 | U.S. President Dwight D. Eisenhower. |
| | Engelhard Elementary School | 1919 | Victor S. Engelhard. Located in Old Louisville; 1004 South First Street, Louisville, KY 40203. |
| | Fairdale Elementary School | 1913 | Located in the Fairdale community. |
| | Farmer Elementary School | 2007 | James E. Farmer, teacher, principal and deputy superintendent of Jefferson County Public Schools until 1976. |
| | Fern Creek Elementary School | 1911 | Located in the Fern Creek community. The earliest building directly related to the present school was constructed in 1911. There was first a log-cabin school was opened in area around 1792. That building, however, cannot be directly linked to the present-day school. |
| | Field Elementary School | 1915 | Judge Emmet Field. |
| | Foster Academy | 1917 | Composer Stephen Foster ("My Old Kentucky Home"). |
| | Frayser Elementary School | 1925 | Nannie Lee Frayser. |
| | Goldsmith Elementary School | 1955 | Located on Goldsmith Lane. Goldsmith is an International/Cultural Studies magnet. Southeast Christian Church, now one of the largest Protestant churches in the U.S., held its first service at the school in July 1962, and met there until it purchased its first property in October of that year. |
| | Greathouse/Shryock Traditional Elementary School | 1980 | Created with the merger of Greathouse Elementary (named for longtime teacher and principal Miss Tommie Greathouse) and Shryock Elementary (named for Gideon Shryock, architect). |
| | Greenwood Elementary School | 1957 | Located on Greenwood Road. |
| | Gutermuth Elementary School | 1970 | Leona Gutermuth. |
| | Hartstern Elementary School | 1969 | Fred J. Hartstern, chief architect of the old Louisville Board of Education. He later created his own firm which designed over 45 school buildings including Ballard and Moore High Schools. |
| | Hawthorne Elementary School | 1954 | Located in Hawthorne neighborhood. |
| | Hazelwood Elementary School | 1951 | Located in Iroquois Homes/Hazelwood neighborhood. |
| | Hite Elementary School | 1963 | Jane Glass Hite (longtime educator). Located in Middletown behind Eastern High School. |
| | Indian Trail Elementary School | 1959 | Located on Indian Trail. |
| | Jacob Elementary School | 1932 | Lieutenant Governor of Kentucky Richard Taylor Jacob. |
| | Jeffersontown Elementary School | 1870s | Located in the city of Jeffersontown. |
| | Johnsontown Road Elementary School | 1967 | Located on Johnsontown Road. |
| | Kennedy Montessori School | 1964 | U.S. President John F. Kennedy, named the year after his November 1963 assassination. |
| | Kenwood Elementary School | 1955 | Located in Kenwood neighborhood. |
| | Kerrick Elementary School | 1876 | Charles H., George, and Harry Kerrick who donated land for the original school. |
| | King Elementary School | 1969 | Civil rights activist Martin Luther King Jr., named the year after his April 1968 assassination. |
| | Klondike Lane Elementary School | 1971 | Located on Klondike Lane. |
| | Laukhuf Elementary School | 1974 | Louis H.C. & Emily Laukhuf (educators for 55 1/2 years; 33 1/2 years in Jefferson County). |
| | Layne Elementary School | 1969 | Offers an academic Honors Program for third, fourth, and fifth graders in reading and math. |
| | Lincoln Elementary Performing Arts School | 1966 | U.S. President Abraham Lincoln. |
| | Lowe Elementary School | 1974 | John Lowe (retired principal from Lyndon Elementary and Waggener High School). |
| | Luhr Elementary School | 1966 | Mattie B. Luhr. |
| | Maupin Elementary School | 1985 | Originally Parkland Elementary School, was renamed for Milburn Taylor Maupin, first African-American central office administrator in the Louisville Public Schools. He served as interim superintendent January–June 1975 and retired as deputy superintendent of Jefferson County Public Schools in 1978. |
| | McFerran Preparatory Academy | 1919 | John B. McFerran, land company president who donated land for Jeffersontown Elementary. |
| | Medora Elementary School | 1880s | Located in Medora neighborhood. |
| | Middletown Elementary School | 1909 | Located in the city of Middletown. |
| | Mill Creek Elementary School | bef. 1876 | Earliest records place the school's existence on/or before 1876. The current building was opened in 1970. |
| | Minors Lane Elementary School | 1968 | Located on Minors Lane. |
| | Norton Commons Elementary School | 2016 | Attached to local YMCA. |
| | Norton Elementary School | 1967 | Jane M. Norton, former school board member and WAVE-TV president. |
| | Okolona Elementary School | 1924 | Located in Okolona community. Formerly known as Okolona High School from 1927 to 1951. |
| | Perry Elementary School | 2023 | Named after William H. Perry, first African-American physician to receive a Kentucky medical license. |
| | Portland Elementary School | 1853 | Located in Portland neighborhood. |
| | Price Elementary School | 1969 | Sarah Jacob Price, school's first principal. |
| | Rangeland Elementary School | | Located on Rangeland Road. |
| | Rutherford Elementary School | 1951 | Sally B. Rutherford. |
| | Sanders Elementary School | 1962 | Provides specialized instrumental programs, including band, orchestra, and the Weisberg Suzuki Violin Program. |
| | Schaffner Traditional School | 1955 | Named after Henry B. Schaffner, member of the Kentucky Board of Education. |
| | Semple Elementary School | 1932 | Named for Louisville-born geographer Ellen Churchill Semple. |
| | Shacklette Elementary School | 1966 | |
| | Shelby Traditional Academy | before 1850 | First Governor of Kentucky, Isaac Shelby. The school was originally constructed by German immigrants. It was purchased by the Louisville Board of Education in 1868. The name (formerly Shelby Elementary) and mission of the school were changed in 2008. |
| | Slaughter Elementary School | 1967 | Horace B. Slaughter. |
| | Smyrna Elementary School | 1961 | Located in Smyrna neighborhood. |
| | St. Matthews Elementary School | 1955 | Located at 601 Browns Lane in the city of St. Matthews. St. Matthews current principal is Mr. Scott Collier. |
| | Stonestreet Elementary School | 1958 | Rosa Phillips Stonestreet, only female superintendent in the history of public education in Louisville's old City Board of Education. |
| | Stopher Elementary School | 2007 | Joseph E. Stopher, attorney and president of Gheens Foundation, a non-profit organization supporting education projects. |
| | Trunnell Elementary School | 1967 | Bertha Trunnell, long time educator in Jefferson County's south end. Trunnell's dedication ceremony took place on October 19, 1967. The school was built on farmland purchased from Clem Wiser. The Wiser family had farmed the land for 150 years. It was first settled by Charles Wiser in the 1800s (decade). |
| | Tully Elementary School | 1978 | Roberta B. Tully. Located on College Drive in Jeffersontown, KY on the site of the original Jeffersontown Elementary. |
| | Waller-Williams Environmental | 2025 | |
| | Watterson Elementary School | 1970 | Henry Watterson, prominent Louisville newspaper editor and namesake of the Watterson Expressway. |
| | Wellington Elementary School | 1968 | Sara Belle Wellington. |
| | Wheeler Elementary School | 1969 | Virginia Wheeler. |
| | Whitney Young Elementary at Engelhard | 1971 | Whitney Moore Young Jr., social worker and civil rights leader, became executive director of the National Urban League in 1961 and the recipient of the Presidential Medal of Freedom in 1969. Young Elementary School merged with Engelhard Elementary School in 2025. |
| | Wilder Elementary School | 1957 | Ninde S. Wilder. |
| | Wilkerson Elementary School | 1956 | Sylvia Wilkerson. |
| | Wilt Elementary School | 1967 | Paxton Wilt: Wilt is named for Paxton M. Wilt, a Jefferson County Board of Education member and executive with the Brown and Williamson company. |
| | Zachary Taylor Elementary School | 1959 | U.S. President Zachary Taylor, finished on November 9, 1959, located in Westport Road. |

== Middle schools ==
Middle schools provide education for grades 6–8, typically ages 11–14.

| Picture | School name | Opening date | Origin of name and other information |
|---|---|---|---|
| | Barret Traditional Middle School | 1932 | Alex G. Barret, Louisville Board of Education member (president in 1918) and Jefferson Circuit Court Judge. |
| | Carrithers Middle School | 1973 | Virginia P. Carrithers. |
| | Conway Middle School | 1972 | Aubrey Conway, Jefferson County Board of Education member and community advocate. |
| | Crosby Middle School | 1974 | The only middle school in Kentucky with a piano laboratory/class elective. Crosby Middle was named for James ('Fessor) Crosby, longtime principal at Middletown Elementary (30+ years). |
| | Farnsley Middle School | 1998 | School was built on historic land owned by David Farnsley (longtime mayor of Louisville). Math/Science/Technology (MST) magnet school. |
| | Frederick Law Olmsted Academy North | 1928 | Frederick Law Olmsted, landscape architect who designed Louisville's major urban parks and system of urban parkways. Originally Southern Middle School, from its location in the southern section of pre-merger Louisville. Later renamed Southern Leadership Academy to reflect revised class organization of single-sex classes. Now an all-boys school. |
| | Frederick Law Olmsted Academy South | 1956 | Frederick Law Olmsted. This facility was formerly Rubado Elementary School, Gottschalk Junior High School, and later Iroquois Middle School. Now an all-girls school. |
| | Frost Middle School | 1966 | Robert Frost, poet. |
| | Highland Middle School | 1928 | Located in the Highlands neighborhood. |
| | Jefferson County Traditional Middle School | 1976 | Third site of the first traditional middle school program in Jefferson County/located in the former Woerner Alternative Middle School building/previously J.M. Atherton High School for Girls, named for Kentucky House Representative John McDougal Atherton. |
| | Thomas Jefferson Middle School | 1981 | U.S. President Thomas Jefferson. Was Thomas Jefferson High School from 1964 to 1981. |
| | Johnson Traditional Middle School | 1930, 1981 | Originally named Parkland Junior High School; renamed in 1981 in honor of Lyman T. Johnson, a civil rights leader, teacher at Central High School for 33 years, and former assistant principal at Parkland Junior High School. He was the principal plaintiff in the federal court case regarding Kentucky's racist Day Law, which had prevented desegregation of schools in Jefferson County. Served as Board Member 1978–1982. |
| | Kammerer Middle School | 1972 | Margaret Kammerer, former music educator in the Jefferson County Public School system. |
| | Kennedy Metro Middle School | 1996 | Alex R. Kennedy, previously Alex R. Kennedy Elementary School. |
| | Knight Middle School | 1973 | Theron Turner Knight, a 42-year Jefferson County educator. |
| | Lassiter Middle School | 1973 | O.M. Lassiter. |
| | Meyzeek Middle School | 1967, 1977 | Originally named Jackson Junior High, renamed in honor of Albert Ernest Meyzeek, civil rights activist and educator who served as the school's principal for a number of years. Was one of the founders of the Louisville Urban League, which he chaired for 29 years. He also served on the state Board of Education 1948–1956. MST magnet school. |
| | Myers Middle School | 1972 | Mary P. Myers. |
| | Newburg Middle School | 1974 | Located in the Newburg neighborhood; MST magnet school. |
| | Noe Middle School | 1974 | Samuel V. Noe, former Superintendent of the old Louisville Public School District. |
| | Ramsey Middle School | 2008 | John L. Ramsey. |
| | Stuart Middle School | 1980 as a Middle School | Jesse Stuart, Kentucky poet and novelist. Previously Stuart High School (1972–1980). |
| | Western Middle School for the Arts | 1929 | Certified Magnet Schools of America creative and performing arts magnet school. |
| | Westport Traditional Middle School and Fine Arts Academy | 1961 | Located on Westport Road (previously Westport High School). |

== High schools ==
High school begins at grade 9 (approx. age 14), running through grade 12 (approx. age 18).

| Picture | School name | Opening date | Origin of name and other information |
|---|---|---|---|
| | Atherton High School | 1923 | J.M. Atherton High School for Girls (at a different location) was named after John McDougal Atherton, a local businessman and politician. He was instrumental in changing Louisville's school system administration from trustees to a Board of Education members. |
| | Ballard High School | 1968 | The high school is named for soldier and statesman Bland Ballard (1761–1853), after whom Ballard County in the state's far-west Purchase area is also named. |
| | Breckinridge Metropolitan High School | 2001 | U.S. Vice President John C. Breckinridge. Previous site of John C. Breckinridge Elementary School. The school has a structured learning environment for students with disciplinary problems and those placed by court order. |
| | Buechel Metropolitan High School | 1983 | Located at the former Bashford Manor Elementary School site in the Buechel neighborhood. The school offers a structured learning environment for students with disciplinary issues. |
| | Butler Traditional High School | 1954 | Suda E. Butler. |
| | Central High School | 1882 | This school was originally called Central Colored High School. It was Louisville's first African American high school. Currently includes magnet programs in medical science, law and government, business, and computer technology. |
| | Doss High School MCA | 1967 | Harry Doss, member of the Jefferson County Board of Education. |
| | DuPont Manual High School | 1892 | The school was originally called duPont Manual Training High School, named for Alfred Victor duPont, a local entrepreneur. The main building housed Louisville Girls' High until it merged into Manual in 1950. Five separate magnet programs, each with its own admissions process—Communications/Media Arts, High School University, Math/Science/Technology, Visual Arts, and Youth Performing Arts. |
| | Eastern High School | 1950 | Located in the city of Middletown in eastern Jefferson County. |
| | Fairdale High School MCA | 1958 | Located in the Fairdale community, southern Jefferson County. |
| | Fern Creek High School | 1923 | Located in the Fern Creek community. |
| | Iroquois High School MCA | | Located in the Beechmont neighborhood near Iroquois Park (nestled between two portions of the Iroquois neighborhood). |
| | Jeffersontown High School MCA | 1925, 1966 | Located in the city of Jeffersontown. A fire, in the 1940s, heavily damaged the gym and cafeteria. This fire plus the opening of Eastern High School in 1950 caused the high school to be closed. The original building (located on same lot as present-day Tully Elementary) was used as an elementary school until it was demolished in 1975. The school was re-established at its present location in 1966 following petition by residents of Jeffersontown. |
| | Jefferson County High School | 1986 | The school was established in 1986 as an open-entry/open-exit program, allowing students to obtain a diploma through flexible scheduling. The school also operates JCPS's Independent Study Program and JCPS eSchool. |
| | Liberty High School | 1997 | The school opened in 1997 at the site of now closed Bruce Middle School. It serves as a non-traditional program for students needing an alternative educational environment, especially those who have encountered academic difficulties. |
| | Louisville Male High School | 1856 | The school originally accepted only boys as students (a Louisville Female High School for girls became Louisville Girls' High School in 1911 and was merged into duPont Manual in 1950). In 1952, when Male became co-educational, the name was changed to Louisville Male and Girls' High School; it reverted to Male High School after protests by faculty, alumni, and students of both sexes. The school was moved in 1991, from downtown to the old campus of Durrett High School. |
| | Pleasure Ridge Park High School MCA | 1958 | Located in the Pleasure Ridge Park community. |
| | Seneca High School MCA | 1957 | |
| | Southern High School | 1951 | Located in southern Jefferson County, 8620 Preston Highway, Louisville, KY 40219. |
| | The Academy @ Shawnee | 1928 | Located in the Shawnee neighborhood. |
| | Valley Traditional High School | 1937 | Located in the Valley Station community. |
| | Waggener Traditional High School | 1954 | Mayme S. Waggener, principal of the old Greathouse Elementary School 1918–1946 in St. Matthews. |
| | Western High School | 1961 | Located in western Jefferson County; Western High School offers the Early College Program that provides college transferable credits. |
| | Youth Performing Arts School | 1977 | A component of Manual High, but with its own admissions process, that offers extensive instruction in performing arts. Academic classes are offered through Manual. |

== Other/combined ==
| Picture | School name | Opening date | Origin of name and other information |
|---|---|---|---|
| | J. Graham Brown School | 1972 | Self-Directed Learning magnet school that offers K–12 education; the only JCPS school that has elementary, middle, and high school students in one building. Named after James Graham Brown, a local real estate developer, horse breeder, distiller, and philanthropist. |
| | Marion C. Moore School | 1969 | Marion C. Moore, an educator Jefferson County Public Schools and administrator at Fern Creek High School 1926–1967. Originally Moore High School, later Moore Traditional High School. Moore Traditional Middle School, formerly Bruce Middle School, was added to the complex in 1999. The school has since operated as a single entity with a single principal since the two schools combined in 2008. |
| Phoenix logo | Phoenix School of Discovery | 2006 | "Rise, Transform, and Soar" The name was selected by the students, parents, and faculty of the school. It was changed in 2009. The school was formed as a result of No Child Left Behind. |

== See also ==
- List of schools in Louisville, Kentucky
