= Medora =

Medora may refer to:

== Places ==
=== United States ===
- Medora, Illinois, a village
- Medora, Indiana, a town
- Medora, Kansas, an unincorporated community
- Medora, Louisville, Kentucky, a neighborhood
- Medora, North Dakota, a city
- Medora site, a pre-Columbian archaeological site in West Baton Rouge Parish, Louisiana
- Medora River, Michigan
- Lake Medora (Michigan)

=== Canada ===
- Medora, Manitoba, a settlement
- Medora Township, Ontario, now part of Muskoka Lakes

== People ==
- Medora (given name), including a list of people with the given name
- John Medora (born 1936), American singer, songwriter, composer and record producer

== Other uses ==
- Medora, heroine of Byron's poem The Corsair, Verdi's opera Il corsaro, and Adam's ballet Le Corsaire
- Medora (film), 2013 documentary by Andrew Cohn, Davy Rothbart about a small-town basketball team, the Medora Hornets
- Medora, Wisconsin, the fictional setting of Aliens in America
- Medora (gastropod), a genus of gastropods
- Medora (horse), a British Thoroughbred racehorse
- Medora Junior-Senior High School, Medora, Indiana

== See also ==
- Medoro (disambiguation)
