= Doss High School =

School in Louisville, Kentucky

Coordinates: 38.15280°N 85.81270°W

Location
- 7601 Saint Andrews Church Road; Louisville, Jefferson, Kentucky 40214; United States

Information
- Opened: 1967
- Status: Open
- School district: Jefferson County Public Schools
- Principal: Dr. Joseph Ellison III
- Teaching staff: 72
- Grades: 9–12
- Enrollment: 1,154 (2023–2024)
- Student to teacher ratio: ~16:1
- Color
- Mascot: Dragon
- Rival: Valley Traditional High School
- Website: https://www.jefferson.kyschools.us/o/doss

Doss High School is a high school located in southwestern Louisville, Kentucky, United States. The school is part of Jefferson County Public Schools. As of the 2023–2024 school year, there were 1,154 students enrolled at the school.

== History ==
Doss High School is located on land that was formerly part of a 500-acre farm established in 1817 by the Wiser family, in an area historically known as Wisertown. In 1838, John and Luzanna Wiser constructed a family home on the exact site where the school now stands. This historic home was demolished in 1966 to clear the land for the construction of Doss High School and adjacent Trunnell Elementary School. As such, the school was originally proposed as Wisertown High School. The school would ultimately be named after then Jefferson County Board of Education chairman, Thomas Harry Doss.

In March 2018, a historical marker commemorating Wisertown was dedicated on Saint Andrews Church Road at the school's campus.

The school was built to relieve overcrowding from Butler, Fairdale, Western, Pleasure Ridge Park, and Valley High Schools. The building opened in the Fall of 1967 at 7601 Saint Andrews Church Road. The school opened with grades 7 through 9, graduated its first class in 1971, and saw its first students complete grade 7 through 12 in 1973.

== Programs ==
=== Historical ===
During the 1990s, as Jefferson County Public Schools (KY) moved their Career and Technical Education Programs into the local high schools, Doss became the recipient of three magnet programs: Cosmetology, Early Childhood Education, and Pre-Engineering.

=== Current ===
Through its partnership with Class Act Federal Credit Union, the school has the first student-run credit union branch in the county. Students train at Class Act's Main Branch over the summer. During the school year, students handle all operations in the Credit Union under the supervision of a team composed of a Qualified Faculty Coordinator and a Branch Coordinator employed by Class Act. Students in this program can major in accounting, banking and financial services, entrepreneurship, and management in the "Class Act Academy of Business and Finance."

Doss High School was among the first group of schools to implement the Academies of Louisville initiative upon its district-wide launch in August 2017. This restructured the school into a comprehensive, career-themed academy model.

As of the 2026–2027 school year, the school is organized into four academies. The Freshman Academy gives incoming students time to explore their options and choose a pathway, while the school's three pathway academies are Business and Education, Health Sciences, and TEC (Technology, Engineering, and Construction).

== Athletics ==
The school athletic complex has two gymnasiums. The main gymnasium, the Leon Mudd Athletic Center, seats a maximum of 1,800 people. The Hayward Shartzer Stadium, the football stadium with a running track, seats a maximum of 2,500 people. Also within the athletic complex is a baseball field.

In the 2025–2026 school year, Doss was one of several other JCPS schools to receive an artificial turf football field and eight-lane track.

== Notable Alumni ==
- Derek Anderson, former NBA basketball player
- Ricky Barber, NFL defensive tackle for the Washington Commanders
- Larry Birkhead, photojournalist, best known as the father of Anna Nicole Smith's baby, Dannielynn
- LaVell Boyd, NFL, football player
- Jeff Brooks, basketball player
- Steve Pence, Lt. Governor of Kentucky, Class of 1971
- Isaac Sowells, NFL, football player
- Tony Williams, former professional basketball player, former head coach of Doss

== See also ==
- Public schools in Louisville, Kentucky
