= Little Loomhouse =

Historic house in Kentucky, United States

- Little Loomhouses
- U.S. National Register of Historic Places
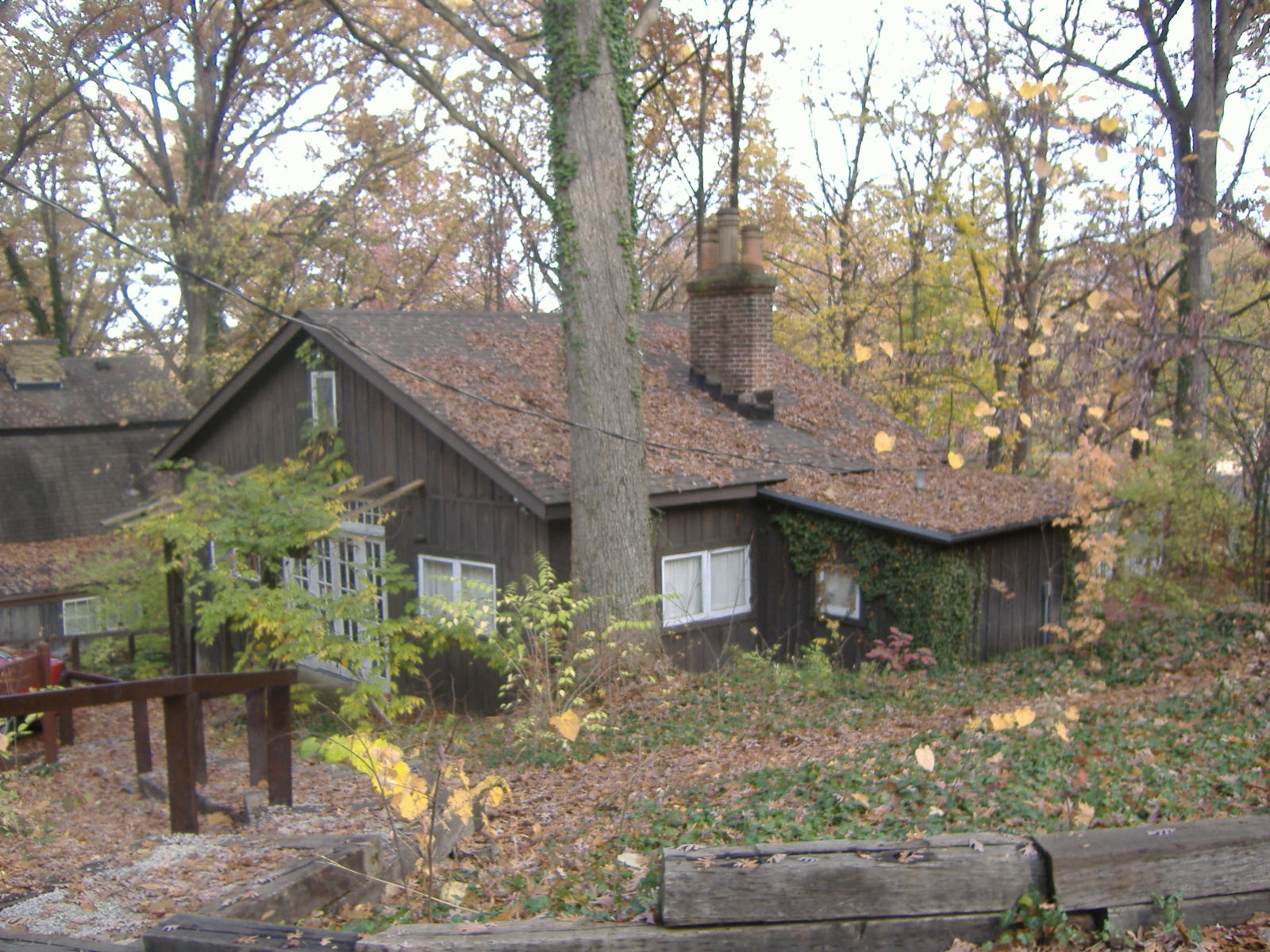
- Wisteria Cabin
- Interactive map of Little Loomhouses
- Location: 328 Kenwood Hill Road; Louisville, Kentucky, 40214
- Coordinates: 38°9′27.71″N 85°46′14.62″W
- Built: 1870
- Website: littleloomhouse.org
- NRHP reference No.: 75000770
- Added to NRHP: June 30, 1975

The Little Loomhouse is a place on the National Register of Historic Places in the Kenwood Hill neighborhood on the south side of Louisville, Kentucky. It consists of three cabins constructed between 1870 and 1896: Esta Cabin, Tophouse, and Wisteria Cabin. It not only displays weavings, but has active education and resident artist programs. The organization participates in several local festivals, giving demonstrations of spinning, dyeing, and weaving. It is the biggest repository of original and classic textile patterns in the United States.

Among the history of the cabins have been the visits of past First Ladies of the United States, and the composition of the song "Happy Birthday to You".

== Esta Cabin ==
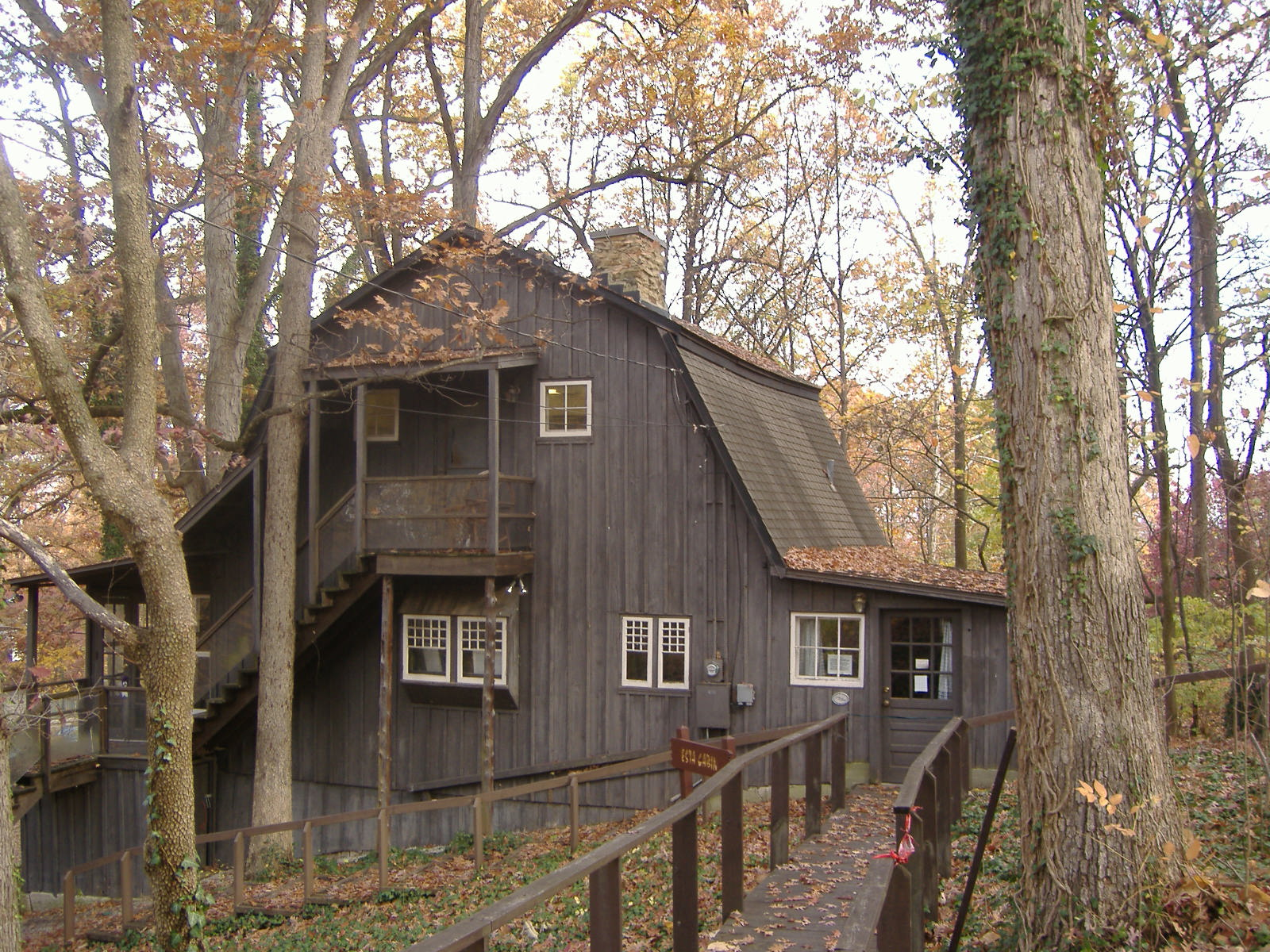
Esta Cabin

The Esta Cabin encapsulates the history of the Loomhouse, and is the cabin where the song "Happy Birthday to You" was first sung. The cabin was first built by a Beoni Figg in 1870 as a business office for his charcoal, lumber, and quarries interests. It has been enlarged since then from a two-room cabin. One of these enhancements replaced the vertical split log siding with board and batten. In 1939 Lou Tate acquired the cabin and based her weaving business there, living on the property until her death in 1979. On a visit in the 1940s while still the First Lady, Eleanor Roosevelt crushed a floorboard, which she later signed; it is now lost. While visiting the Loomhouse, Mrs. Roosevelt bought woven mats that would see use in the White House. Displays of weaving decorate the interior.

== Other cabins ==
Wisteria, which houses the office and giftshop, was built in 1895 and similarly became endangered. In fact, it had to be closed for years due to erosion damage; in 1986, Jefferson County Judge/Executive Harvey Sloane helped in a rededication ceremony celebrating the restoration of the cabin.

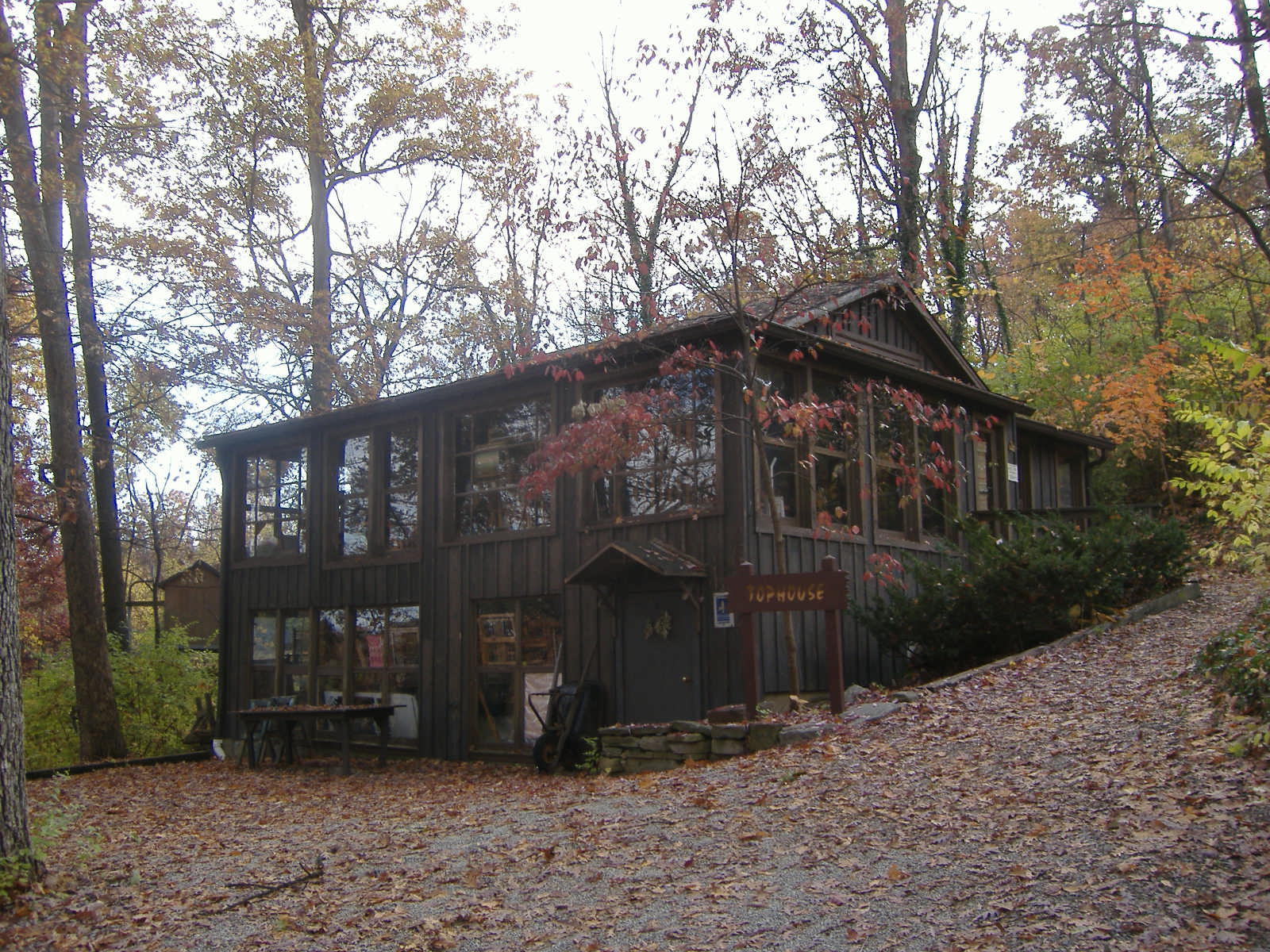
Tophouse Cabin

The Tophouse was built as a summer home for the well-to-do Sam Stone Bush in 1896. It was made of oak harvested from the hill upon which it stands. It was acquired by Tate in 1939 for using her looms. Since that time it has been used for looms, save during World War II when supplies dwindled, and she rented out the cabin for both funding and providing a defense worker's family a place to live. Although endangered by development in the 1960s and 1970s, it still stands today as the home of the looms from which the Little Loomhouse gains its name, and where weaving is still taught.

== Collective history ==
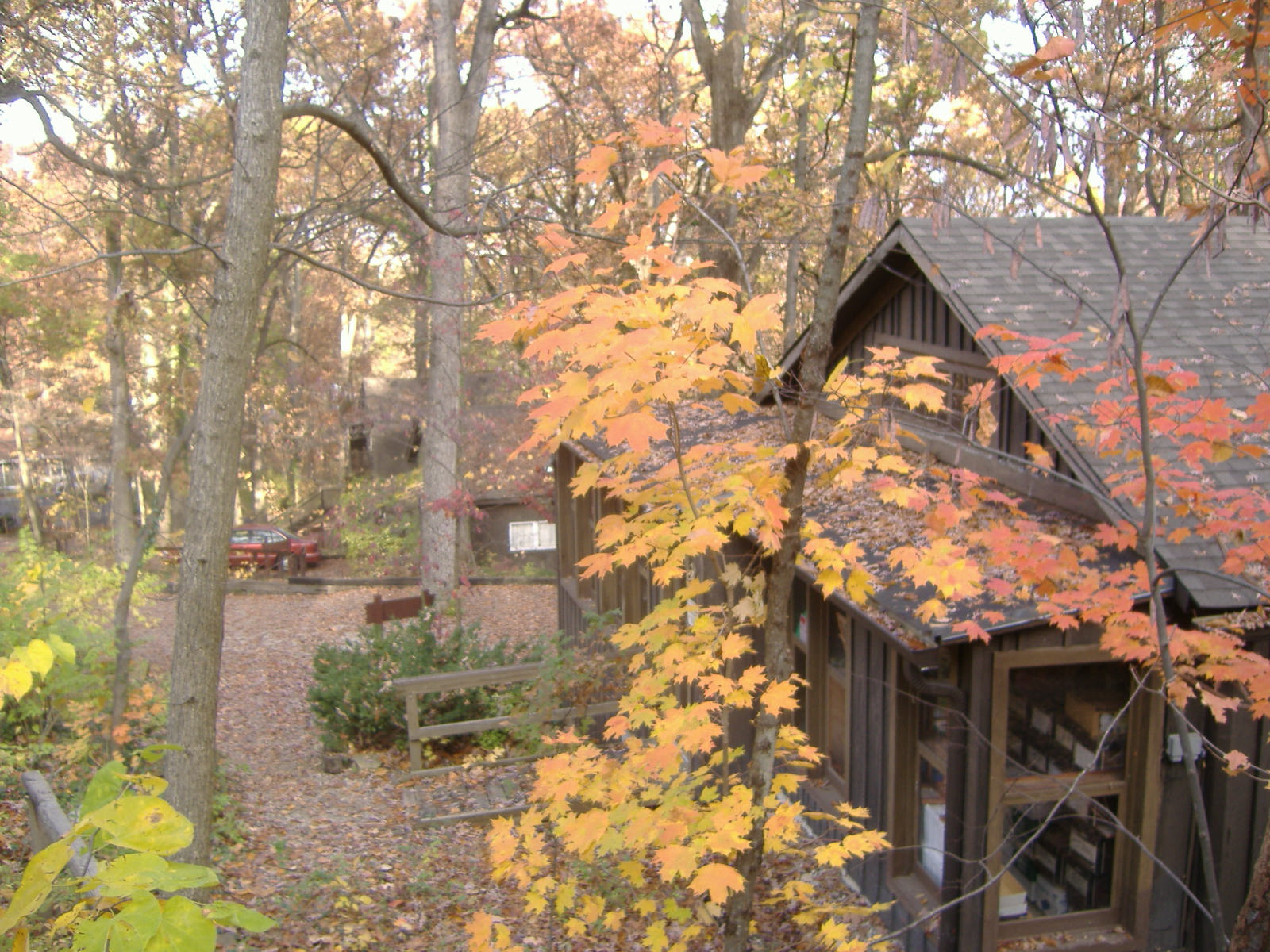
Looking downhill at the cabins

For many years the Loomhouse has sold a small portable table loom designed by First Lady Lou Henry Hoover, wife of President Herbert Hoover.

In his 1948 visit to Louisville, Frank Lloyd Wright praised both the cabins and the setting. In 1940, he described it as "board-and-batten summer houses, set down in the dignity of nature".

By 2007, the cabins were deteriorating. Stefanie Buzan wrote in a book about the site that, "They weren't built to last this long." Problems include tree trimming, sagging floors, and preventing the cabins from falling down the side of Kenwood Hill by using reinforcements. It was hoped that a second edition of Buzan's book would raise funds for needed repairs, as the money made normally by the Loomhouse was not enough for the needed repairs.

== Gallery ==
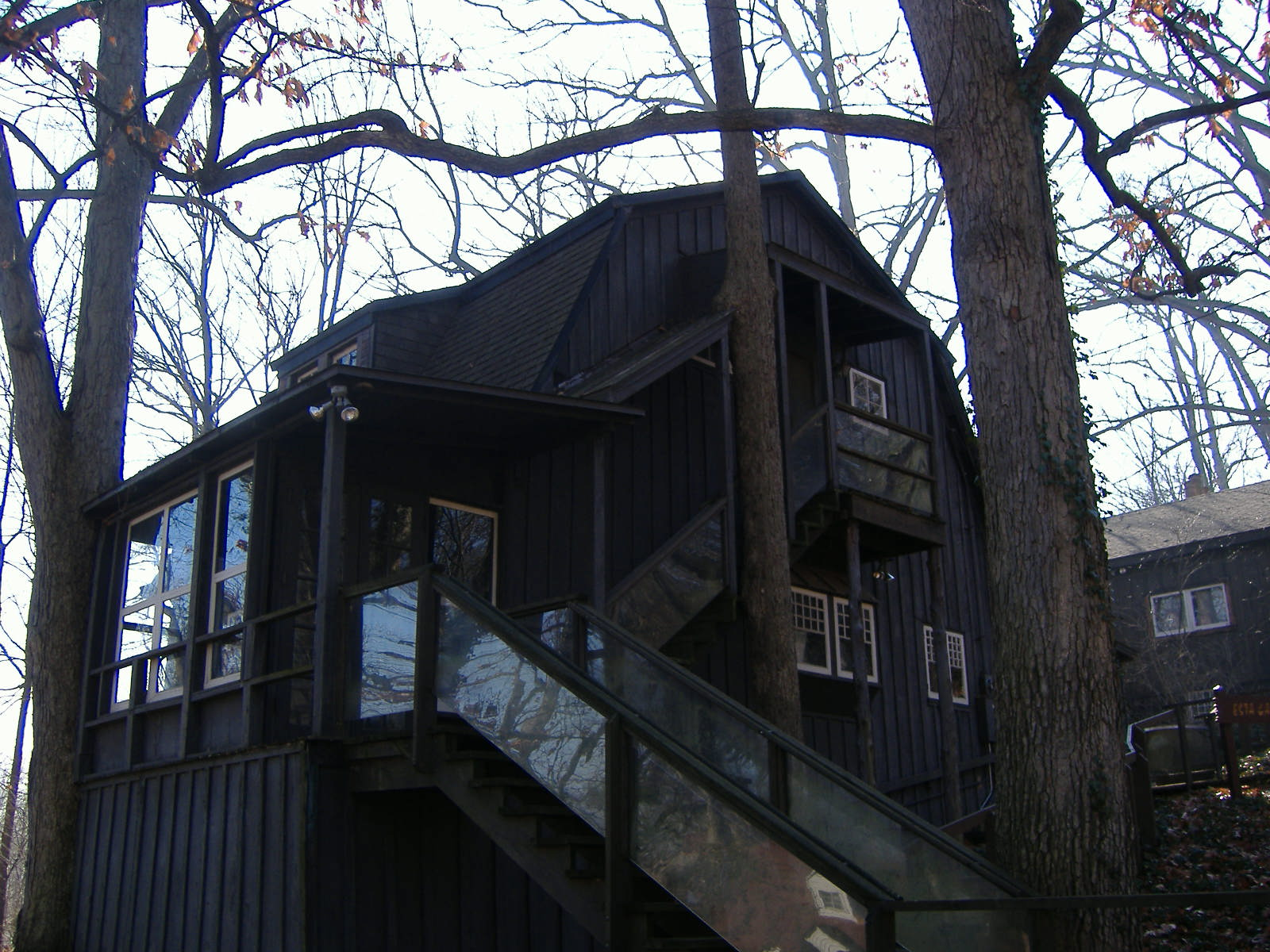
Esta Cabin backside

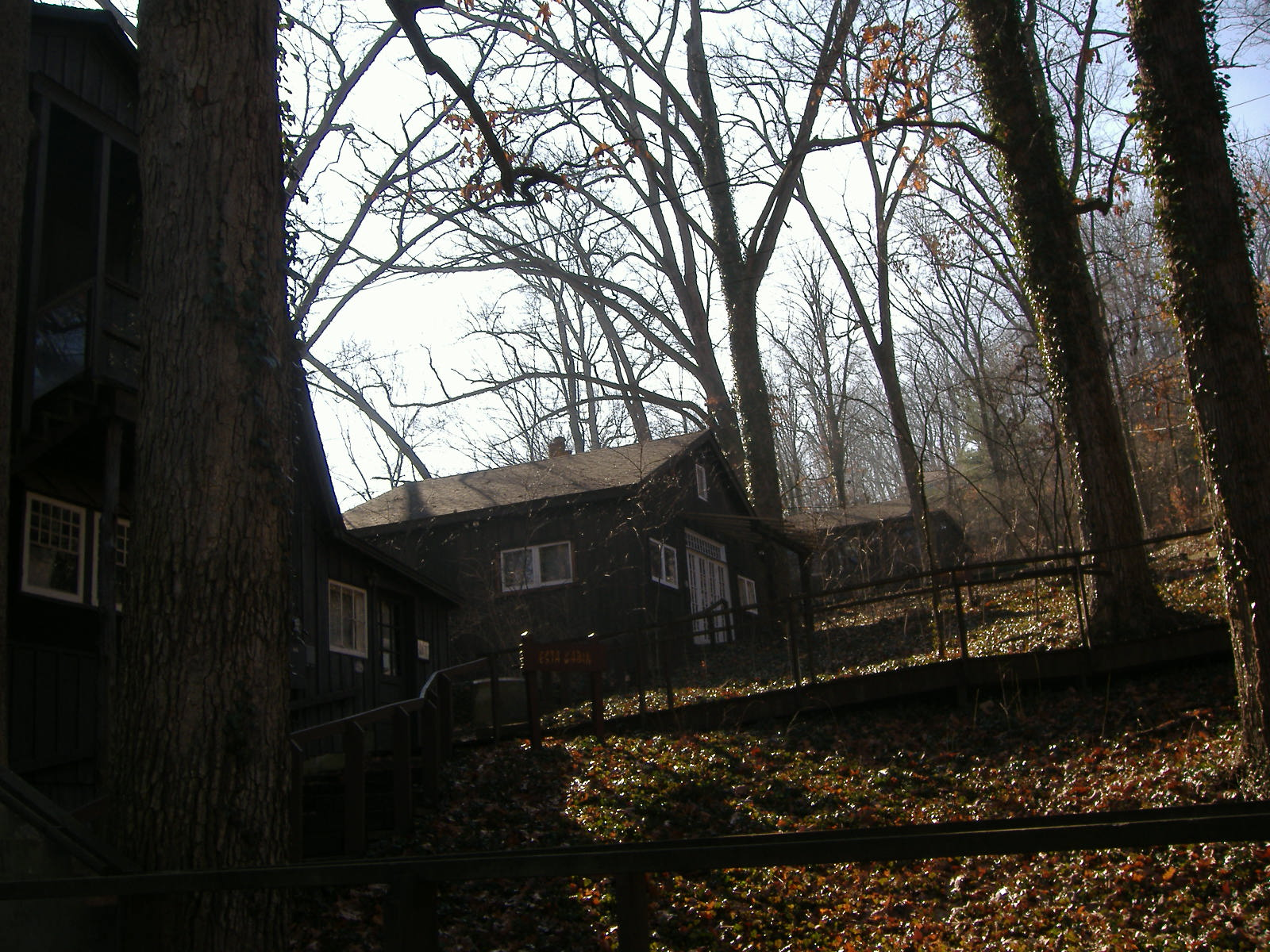
The three cabins

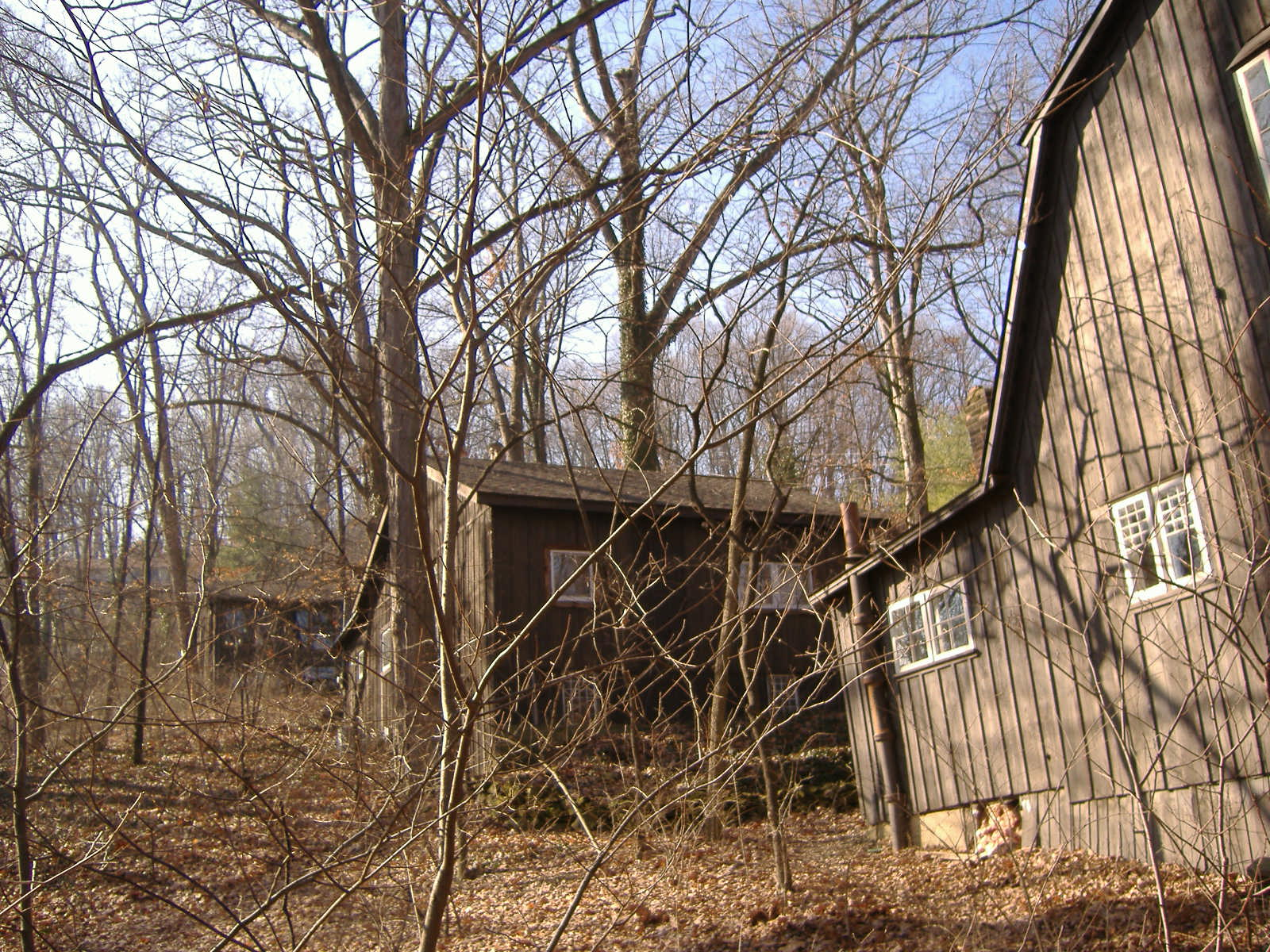
Backside of the three cabins

== See also ==
- Iroquois, Louisville
- Iroquois Park
- Colonial Gardens
- List of attractions and events in the Louisville metropolitan area
