= Forest Able =

American basketball player (1932–2026)

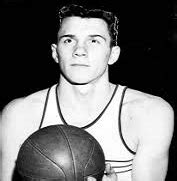

Personal information
- Born: July 27, 1932 Louisville, Kentucky, U.S.
- Died: January 4, 2026 (aged 93) Fairdale, Kentucky, U.S.
- Listed height: 6 ft 3 in (1.91 m)
- Listed weight: 180 lb (82 kg)

Career information
- High school: Fairdale (Louisville, Kentucky)
- College: Western Kentucky (1953–1956)
- NBA draft: 1956: 3rd round, 20th overall pick
- Drafted by: Syracuse Nationals
- Playing career: 1956–1957
- Position: Guard
- Number: 6

Career history
- 1956–1957: Syracuse Nationals
- Stats at NBA.com
- Stats at Basketball Reference

Forest Edward Able (July 27, 1932 – January 4, 2026), nicknamed Frosty, was an American professional basketball player.

== Biography ==
A 6-foot-3-inch (1.91 m) guard, Able attended Fairdale High School in Louisville, Kentucky. He enrolled at the University of Louisville and played a season on their freshman team during the 1951–52 season. Able was the subject of controversy when he announced his intention to enrol at Western Kentucky State College (now Western Kentucky University) to be closer to his girlfriend who also attended the college. Able starred with the Western Kentucky Hilltoppers, where he tallied 1,221 career points. As a senior, Able was named the Hilltoppers’ most valuable player and named to the Newspaper Enterprise Association 26-man All-America squad.

After his college career, Able had a brief stint with the Syracuse Nationals, who selected him in the 1956 NBA draft. He appeared in one game against the Rochester Royals where he recorded two field goal attempts, an assist and a rebound. Able considered himself "a nervous wreck" during his appearance and was released shortly after his debut.

Following the close of his playing career, Able became head coach at his alma mater Fairdale High School in 1959 and coached for more than 10 years. He taught physical education and health for 30 years.

Able was inducted into the WKU Athletic Hall of Fame in 2011.

Able died at his home in Fairdale, Kentucky, on January 4, 2026, at the age of 93. His grandson, Kameron, played on the Morehead State Eagles football team.

== NBA career statistics ==
Legend
GP	Games played	GS	Games started	MPG	Minutes per game
FG%	Field goal percentage	3P%	3-point field goal percentage	FT%	Free throw percentage
RPG	Rebounds per game	APG	Assists per game	SPG	Steals per game
BPG	Blocks per game	PPG	Points per game	**Bold**	Career high

=== Regular season ===
Year	Team	GP	GS	MPG	FG%	3P%	FT%	RPG	APG	SPG	BPG	PPG
1956–57	Syracuse	1	–	1.0	.000	–	.000	1.0	1.0	–	–	0.0
Career		1	–	1.0	.000	–	.000	1.0	1.0	–	–	0.0
