= LaVell Boyd =

American football player (born 1976)

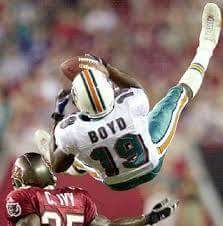
- Boyd in 2001

No. 85
- Position: Wide receiver

Personal information
- Born: September 12, 1976 (age 50); Fort Jackson, South Carolina, U.S.
- Listed height: 6 ft 3 in (1.91 m)
- Listed weight: 218 lb (99 kg)

Career information
- High school: Doss (KY)
- College: Louisville
- NFL draft: 2000: undrafted

Career history
- Cincinnati Bengals (2000); Miami Dolphins (2001)*; Minnesota Vikings (2002)*; Rhein Fire (2003); Houston Texans (2003)*; Georgia Force (2004)
- * Offseason or practice squad member only

Career NFL statistics
- Games played: 2
- Stats at Pro Football Reference

LaVell Boyd (born September 12, 1976) is an American former professional football player who was a wide receiver in the National Football League (NFL). He played college football for the Louisville Cardinals.

== Early life ==
Boyd is a graduate of Doss High School and was the all-time leading wide receiver in (Louisville) Jefferson County history. He later went on to the University of Louisville, where he finished his career number six on the all-time receptions list and helped lead his team to two bowl games. LaVell majored in Sociology and graduated from the University Of Louisville .

== Professional career ==
LaVell Boyd played for the Cincinnati Bengals during the 2000 NFL season. In 2001 he signed with the Miami Dolphins, where he was injured. In 2002 Boyd played with the Minnesota Vikings. The following season, Boyd played in NFL Europe with the Rhein Fire. In 2004, he played for the Arena Football League's Georgia Force.

== Post-NFL career ==
Boyd coached at Shawnee High School in Louisville, Kentucky for part of the 2007 season. He was soon hired as the varsity football coach at Western High School in Shively, Kentucky. LaVell led the Warriors to the 2010 KHSAA State Semifinals and had Western High School ranked as a top five team in the State for the 2011 season. Boyd received the 2010 Coach of the Year Award. Powerhouse Western High School won four straight District titles and played for three straight Regional Championships winning 2010.
