= Isaac Sowells =

American football player (born 1982)

No. 61, 73, 79
- Position: Guard

Personal information
- Born: May 4, 1982 (age 44); Louisville, Kentucky, U.S.
- Listed height: 6 ft 3 in (1.91 m)
- Listed weight: 320 lb (145 kg)

Career information
- High school: Doss (Louisville)
- College: Indiana
- NFL draft: 2006: 4th round, 112th overall pick

Career history
- Cleveland Browns (2006–2008); Cincinnati Bengals (2010)*; Hartford Colonials (2010); Detroit Lions (2011)*
- * Offseason or practice squad member only

Career NFL statistics
- Games played: 17
- Stats at Pro Football Reference

Isaac Sowells (born May 4, 1982) is an American former professional football player who was a guard in the National Football League (NFL). He played college football for the Indiana Hoosiers and was selected by the Cleveland Browns in the fourth round of the 2006 NFL draft.

Sowells was also a member of the Cincinnati Bengals, Hartford Colonials, and Detroit Lions.

== Early life ==
Sowells attended Doss High School in Louisville.

== College career ==
Sowells played college football for Indiana University. He played in 27 games and was a general studies major.

== Professional career ==
Pre-draft measurables
| Height | Weight | Arm length | Hand span | 40-yard dash | 10-yard split | 20-yard split | 20-yard shuttle | Three-cone drill | Vertical jump | Broad jump | Bench press |
|---|---|---|---|---|---|---|---|---|---|---|---|
| 6 ft 3 1/2 in (1.92 m) | 324 lb (147 kg) | 34 3/8 in (0.87 m) | 11 in (0.28 m) | 5.21 s | 1.82 s | 3.02 s | 4.98 s | 8.13 s | 28.5 in (0.72 m) | 8 ft 5 in (2.57 m) | 20 reps |
All values from NFL Combine

=== Cleveland Browns ===
Sowells was selected by the Cleveland Browns in the fourth round (112th overall) in the 2006 NFL draft. Sowells was released by the Browns on September 4, 2009, as they made their final roster cuts.

=== Cincinnati Bengals ===
Sowells was signed by the Cincinnati Bengals on June 1, 2010. He was waived on September 4.

=== Detroit Lions ===
On August 4, 2011, Sowells signed with the Detroit Lions, but was waived on August 21.

== Personal life ==
Sowells resides in Louisville, Kentucky with his wife Latrese Sowells, his daughter Halani, and two sons Isaac Jr. and Keiyan. He is now a police officer with the Louisville Metropolitan Police Department. As of 2026, he is the offensive line coach at Eastern High School.
