= Medora (given name) =

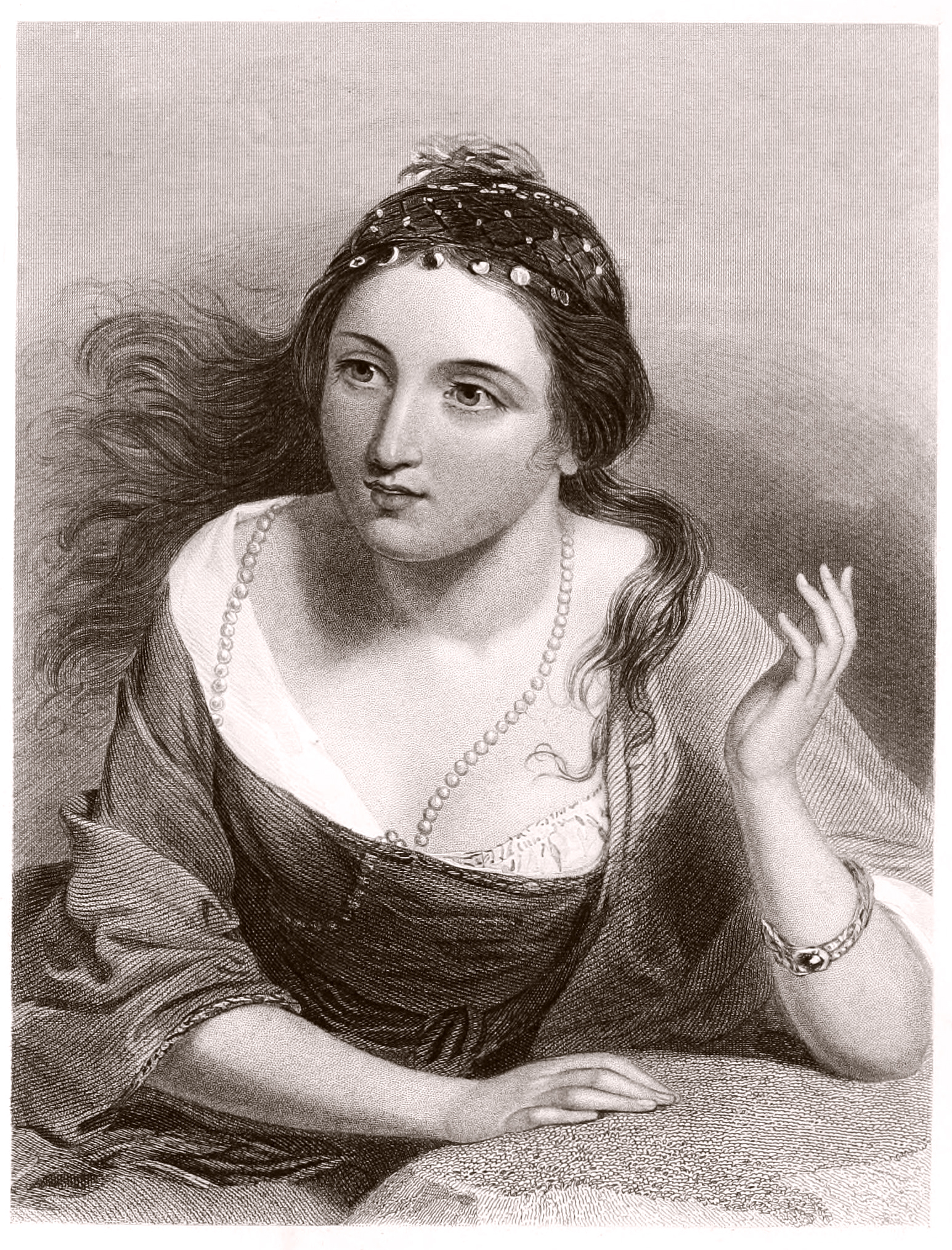
- Medora from The Corsair by George Gordon, Lord Byron
- Gender: Female
- Language: English

Origin
- Meaning: Created, literary name

Medora is a feminine given name popularized by George Gordon, Lord Byron for the heroine of his 1814 poem The Corsair. The name of the romantic heroine has since been used for girls in the Anglosphere. Variants of the name in use in the 19th century were Maddora, Madora, Medorah, Medoria, Medorra, and Midora. Medoro, a similar name, is a male character in the 1516 Italian epic poem Orlando Furioso by Ludovico Ariosto, a poem which influenced later works. Medora is also a surname.

== Given name ==
- Medora Henson (1861–1928), American-English soprano-singer
- Medora Louise Krieger (1904–1994), American geologist
- Medora Olive Newell (c. 1872–?), American telegraph operator, perhaps the first woman telegraph operator to send a message on a ship
- Medora de Vallombrosa, Marquise de Morès (1856–1921), wife of Antoine Amédée-Marie-Vincent Amot Manca de Vallombrosa, the Marquis de Morès, and namesake of Medora, North Dakota

== Pen name ==
- Medora Gordon Byron, pseudonym of a 19th-century author of unknown identity; possibly Julia Maria Byron (1782–1858), a cousin of Lord Byron
