= Fairdale High School =

Location
- 1001 Fairdale Road; Fairdale, Kentucky 40118; United States; 38.11200°N 85.75160°W

Information
- Opened: 1958
- School district: Jefferson County Public Schools
- Principal: Brandi Corbin
- Teaching staff: 88.29 (FTE)
- Grades: 9–12
- Enrollment: 1,401 (2023–2024)
- Student to teacher ratio: 15.87
- Colors: Navy, gold
- Team name: Bulldogs
- Website: sites.google.com/jefferson.kyschools.us/fairdalehighschool/home

Fairdale High School is a high school located in the Fairdale area of Louisville, Kentucky, United States. It is part of the Jefferson County Public Schools. As of the 2013–14 school year, there were 1,804 students at the school.

Areas of study include Law Enforcement, Fire and Emergency Medical Technology, Medical Office Technology, Radio Electronic Communications, and Heavy Equipment Science/Construction. Students shadow professionals in each field and have the opportunity to work in an internship position at various facilities throughout the Louisville area.

== Academics ==
Fairdale was named a Best High School by U.S. News at the Bronze level in 2013. Fairdale maintains a varsity and junior varsity Quick Recall team.

== Athletics ==
Sports offered at Fairdale include football, baseball, basketball, golf, wrestling, tennis, track and field, cross country, swimming, bowling, and most recently, soccer for boys, and volleyball, softball, basketball, golf, tennis, track and field, cross country, bowling, and cheerleading for girls. There is also a dance team for either sex. Archery is also available.

Fairdale hosts the King of the Bluegrass Basketball and Wrestling Tournament annually. The King of the Bluegrass All-Team Tennis Championships were held from 2008 through 2010, and it is now known as the Decoturf High School Tennis Team Championships. New in 2020, Fairdale hosts King/Queen of the Hill Cross Country course at Horine Park.

Fairdale was Kentucky State Champion in men's basketball in 1990, 1991, and 1994.

== Notable alumni and faculty ==
- Forest Able, former professional basketball player, later head basketball coach and teacher at Fairdale
- Jeffery Donohue, politician and a former Democratic member of the Kentucky House of Representatives representing District 37 from 2013 to 2023
- Patty Loveless, country music singer

== See also ==
- Public schools in Louisville, Kentucky
