= Valley Traditional High School =

High school in Kentucky, United States

Coordinates: 38.10780°N 85.86750°W

Valley High School

Location
- 10200 Dixie Highway; Louisville, (Jefferson County), Kentucky 40272; United States

Information
- Type: Public high school
- School district: Jefferson County Schools
- Principal: Jennie Currin
- Teaching staff: 56.90 (FTE)
- Enrollment: 886 (2023-2024)
- Student to teacher ratio: 15.57
- Colors: Gold, blue and white
- Nickname: Vikings
- Rival: Doss High School
- Website: https://www.jefferson.kyschools.us/o/valley

Valley High School is a high school in the Valley Station area of Louisville, Kentucky.

Valley became a "traditional" school in 1999 in an attempt to boost enrollment after it had fallen to 63% of capacity.

Currently the enrollment is about 1,000. Valley has been added onto three times plus has had temporary buildings built. Over the years six schools have been built to relieve Valley enrollment and better serve the greater Louisville area.

In March 2026, the Valley High School chess team won the National Championship in the Under 800 division in Chicago.

== See also ==
- Public schools in Louisville, Kentucky
