= Hazelwood, Louisville =

Neighborhood in Louisville, Kentucky

Coordinates: 38.17780°N 85.78140°W

Hazelwood is a neighborhood on the south side of Louisville, Kentucky, United States. Its boundaries are Manslick Road to the west, I-264 to the north, Taylor Boulevard to the east, and Hazelwood Avenue to the south. Its development, as with other nearby neighborhoods, was spurred by the opening of Iroquois Park in the early 1890s. E.E. Meacham first subdivided the land in 1899. A larger subdivision, called Bergmann's Addition, was financed in 1902. The Hazelwood Center, opened in 1907, is a former tuberculous center and since 1971 a hospital for the mentally handicapped located in the neighborhood.
