= Tony Williams (basketball) =

American basketball player

Tony Williams (born June 21, 1978) is an American former basketball player. He played in the Asociación Deportiva Atenas for 14 seasons after playing college basketball with the Louisville Cardinals and becoming one of the school's 1000-point scorers.

He is now the head basketball coach at Doss High School.

He was a member of CardinalSportsZone.com after playing and before coaching.
