= Conrad the Corsair =

Painting by Horace Vernet

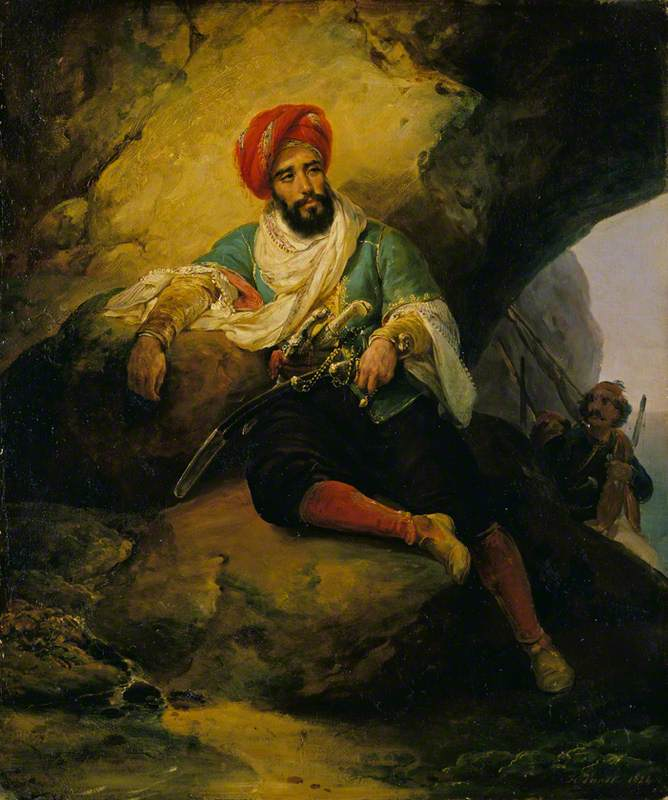
- Artist: Horace Vernet
- Year: 1824
- Type: Oil on canvas
- Dimensions: 64.5 cm × 54.2 cm (25.4 in × 21.3 in)
- Location: Wallace Collection, London

Conrad the Corsair is an 1824 oil painting by the French artist Horace Vernet. Inspired by Lord Byron's 1814 poem The Corsair it depicts Conrad, a pirate notorious across the Aegean Sea seated in a cave as two of his men approach. Along with Walter Scott, Byron was a popular literary source for younger French painters, particularly those in the romantic movement. Vernet was the first French artist to depict scenes from Byron's works.

Today it is in the collection of the Wallace Collection in London, having been acquired by the Marquess of Hertford in 1860.

== Bibliography ==
- Fahy, Everett (ed.) The Wrightsman Pictures. Metropolitan Museum of Art, 2005.
- Ingamells, John. The Wallace Collection: French Nineteenth Century. Trustees of the Wallace Collection, 1985.
- Harkett, Daniel & Hornstein, Katie (ed.) Horace Vernet and the Thresholds of Nineteenth-Century Visual Culture. Dartmouth College Press, 2017.
- Noon, Patrick & Bann, Stephen. Constable to Delacroix: British Art and the French Romantics. Tate, 2003.
