= Louisville Cardinals women's basketball =

College basketball team

2026–27 Louisville Cardinals women's basketball team
- University: University of Louisville
- Head coach: Jeff Walz (20th season)
- Location: Louisville, Kentucky
- Arena: KFC Yum! Center (capacity: 22,090)
- Conference: Atlantic Coast Conference
- Nickname: Cardinals
- Colors: Red and black

NCAA Division I tournament runner-up
- 2009, 2013
Other NCAA Division I tournament results
Final Four	2009, 2013, 2018, 2022
Elite Eight	2009, 2013, 2014, 2018, 2019, 2021, 2022, 2023
Sweet Sixteen	2008, 2009, 2011, 2013, 2014, 2015, 2017, 2018, 2019, 2021, 2022, 2023, 2026
Appearances	1983, 1984, 1993, 1995, 1997, 1998, 1999, 2001, 2005, 2006, 2007, 2008, 2009, 2011, 2012, 2013, 2014, 2015, 2016, 2017, 2018, 2019, 2021, 2022, 2023, 2024, 2025, 2026

Conference tournament champions
- 1980, 1981, 1983, 1984, 1993, 2018

Conference regular-season champions
- 1992, 1997, 1999, 2001, 2018, 2019, 2020, 2021

Uniforms
Home	Away

The Louisville Cardinals women's basketball team represents the University of Louisville in women's basketball. The school competes in the Atlantic Coast Conference in Division I of the National Collegiate Athletic Association (NCAA). The Cardinals play home basketball games at KFC Yum! Center in Louisville, Kentucky.

Louisville's current head coach is Jeff Walz, who joined the team in 2007. Under his leadership the school moved into the top 15 in attendance his first year, averaging 6,456 fans per game.

Louisville represented USA basketball at Globl Jam 2023, and defeated team Canada, by a score of 68–66 in the gold medal game.

== History ==
The Cardinals have reached the NCAA Tournament in 1983, 1984, 1993, 1995, 1997, 1998, 1999, 2001, 2005, 2006, 2007, 2008, 2009, 2011, 2012, 2013, 2014, 2015, 2016, 2017, 2018, 2019, 2021, 2022, 2023, 2024, and 2025. They reached the Final Four 4 times in 2009, 2013, 2018, and 2022; losing in the title game twice (09,13). They have been in six conferences, playing in the Kentucky Women's Intercollegiate Conference from 1978 to 1981, the Metro Conference from 1981 to 1995, Conference USA from 1995 to 2005, the Big East Conference from 2005 to 2013, the American Athletic Conference for the 2013–14 season, and the Atlantic Coast Conference since 2014.

=== Terry Hall era (1975–1980) ===
In 1975, Terry Hall was hired as the first full time head coach for the Louisville women's basketball team. Hall compiled a record of 79-54 and led the Cardinals to the 1980 Metro Conference Championship.

=== Peggy Fiehrer era (1980–1989) ===
During her tenure, Fiehrer led the Cardinals to three Metro Conference Tournament championships and the first NCAA tournament appearance in program history.

=== Martin Clapp & Sara White era (1997–2003) ===
Husband and wife duo Martin Clapp and Sara White were hired as co-head coaches in 1997.

In 2000, Martin Clapp took over as head coach.

In 2003, Clapp resigned as head coach of the Cardinals.

=== Jeff Walz era (2007–present) ===
Jeff Walz was hired as a first year head coach from the University of Maryland in 2007. Under the guidance of Walz, Louisville became a college basketball power. In his first season, he guided the Cardinals to the first NCAA Sweet Sixteen appearance in program history. During his tenure at Louisville, the Cards have made fifteen NCAA tournament appearances, twelve Sweet 16s, eight Elite Eights, four Finals Fours, and two national championship appearances.

== Year by year results ==
Record table
Season	Coach	Overall	Conference	Standing	Postseason
Terry Hall (Metro Conference) (1975–1980)
1975–76	Terry Hall	12-11			
1976–77	Terry Hall	15-7			
1977–78	Terry Hall	18-9			
1978–79	Terry Hall	17-10	7-5		
1979–80	Terry Hall	17-17	7-5		
Terry Hall:		79–54 (.594)	-–- (–)		
Peggy Fiehrer (Metro Conference) (1980–1989)
1980–81	Peggy Fiehrer	14-14	5-7		
1981–82	Peggy Fiehrer	19-8	4-2		
1982–83	Peggy Fiehrer	20-10	5-4		NCAA 1st round
1983–84	Peggy Fiehrer	15-16	7-3		NCAA 1st round
1984–85	Peggy Fiehrer	17-14	4-6		
1985–86	Peggy Fiehrer	8-20	2-8		
1986–87	Peggy Fiehrer	11-17	4-8		
1987–88	Peggy Fiehrer	12-16	4-8		
1988–89	Peggy Fiehrer	4-24	0-12		
Peggy Fiehrer:		120–139 (.463)	35–58 (.376)		
Bud Childers (Metro Conference) (1989–1995)
1989–90	Bud Childers	17-12	6-8		
1990–91	Bud Childers	24-11	9-5		
1991–92	Bud Childers	20-9	11-1		
1992–93	Bud Childers	19-12	7-5		NCAA 2nd round
1993–94	Bud Childers	10-16	7-5		
1994–95	Bud Childers	25-8	7-5		NCAA 2nd round
Bud Childers (Conference USA) (1995–1997)
1995–96	Bud Childers	17-11	9-5		
1996–97	Bud Childers	20-9	12-2		NCAA 1st round
Bud Childers:		152–88 (.633)	68–36 (.654)		
Martin Clapp & Sara White (Conference USA) (1997–2000)
1997–98	Martin Clapp & Sara White	20-12	12-14		
1998–99	Martin Clapp & Sara White	21-11	12-14		NCAA 1st round
1999–00	Martin Clapp & Sara White	16-13	9-7		NCAA 1st round
Martin Clapp & Sara White:		57–36 (.613)	33–35 (.485)		
Martin Clapp (Conference USA) (2000–2003)
2000–01	Martin Clapp	19-10	14-2		NCAA 1st round
2001–02	Martin Clapp	17-13	8-6		
2002–03	Martin Clapp	15-14	5-9		
Martin Clapp:		108–73 (.597)	60–52 (.536)		
Tom Collen (Conference USA) (2003–2005)
2003–04	Tom Collen	20-10	11-3		
2004–05	Tom Collen	22-9	11-3		NCAA 1st round
Tom Collen (Big East Conference) (2005–2007)
2005–06	Tom Collen	19-10	10-6		NCAA 1st round
2006–07	Tom Collen	27-8	10-6		NCAA 2nd round
Tom Collen:		88–37 (.704)	42–18 (.700)		
Jeff Walz (Big East Conference) (2007–2013)
2007–08	Jeff Walz	26-10	10-6	T-5th	NCAA Sweet Sixteen
2008–09	Jeff Walz	34-5	14-2	2nd	NCAA Runner Up
2009–10	Jeff Walz	14-18	5-11	T-12th	WBI 1st round
2010–11	Jeff Walz	22-13	10-6	T-5th	NCAA Sweet Sixteen
2011–12	Jeff Walz	23-10	10-6	T-6th	NCAA 2nd round
2012–13	Jeff Walz	29-9	11-5	T-3rd	NCAA Runner Up
Jeff Walz (American Athletic Conference) (2013–2014)
2013–14	Jeff Walz	33-5	16-2	2nd	NCAA Elite Eight
Jeff Walz (Atlantic Coast Conference) (2014–present)
2014–15	Jeff Walz	27-7	12-4	3rd	NCAA Sweet Sixteen
2015–16	Jeff Walz	26-8	15-1	2nd	NCAA 2nd round
2016–17	Jeff Walz	29-8	12-4	T-4th	NCAA Sweet Sixteen
2017–18	Jeff Walz	36-3	15-1	T-1st	NCAA Final Four
2018–19	Jeff Walz	32-4	14-2	T-1st	NCAA Elite Eight
2019–20	Jeff Walz	28-4	16-2	1st	Postseason Cancelled
2020–21	Jeff Walz	26-4	14-2	1st	NCAA Elite Eight
2021–22	Jeff Walz	29-5	16-2	2nd	NCAA Final Four
2022–23	Jeff Walz	26-12	12-6	T-4th	NCAA Elite Eight
2023–24	Jeff Walz	24-10	12-6	T-5th	NCAA First Round
2024–25	Jeff Walz	22-11	13-5	T-4th	NCAA Second Round
2025–26	Jeff Walz	29–8	15–3	2nd	NCAA Sweet Sixteen
Jeff Walz:		515–154 (.770)	216–67 (.763)		
Total:		1062–545 (.661)			
National champion Postseason invitational champion Conference regular season champion Conference regular season and conference tournament champion Division regular season champion Division regular season and conference tournament champion Conference tournament champion

== NCAA tournament results ==
Louisville has reached the NCAA Division I women's basketball tournament 28 times. They have a record of 47–28.

Year	Seed	Round	Opponent	Result
1983	#7	First Round	(2) Texas	L 84–55
1984	#8	First Round	(1) Georgia	L 112–69
1993	#11	First Round; Second Round	(6) Connecticut (3) Auburn	W 74–71; L 66–61
1995	#11	First Round; Second Round	(6) Oregon (3) Georgia	W 67–65; L 81–68
1997	#10	First Round	(7) Auburn	L 68–65
1998	#10	First Round; Second Round	(7) Utah (2) Duke	W 69–61; L 69–53
1999	#10	First Round	(7) Illinois	L 69–67
2001	#13	First Round	(4) Xavier	L 80–52
2005	#9	First Round	(8) USC	L 65–49
2006	#9	First Round	(8) Vanderbilt	L 76–64
2007	#6	First Round; Second Round	(11) BYU (3) Arizona State	W 80–54; L 67–58
2008	#4	First Round; Second Round; Sweet Sixteen	(13) Miami (OH) (5) Kansas State (1) North Carolina	W 81–67; W 80–63; L 78–74
2009	#3	First Round; Second Round; Sweet Sixteen; Elite Eight; Final Four; Championship	(14) Liberty (6) LSU (2) Baylor (1) Maryland (1) Oklahoma (1) Connecticut	W 62–42; W 62–52; W 56–39; W 77–60; W 61–59; L 76–54
2011	#7	First Round; Second Round; Sweet Sixteen	(10)Vanderbilt (2) Xavier (11) Gonzaga	W 81–62; W 85–75; L 76–69
2012	#7	First Round; Second Round	(10) Michigan State (2) Maryland	W 67–55; L 72–68
2013	#5	First Round; Second Round; Sweet Sixteen; Elite Eight; Final Four; Championship	(12) Middle Tennessee State (4) Purdue (1) Baylor (2) Tennessee (2) California (1) Connecticut	W 74–49; W 76–63; W 82–81; W 86–78; W 64–57; L 93–60
2014	#3	First Round; Second Round; Sweet Sixteen; Elite Eight	(14) Idaho (6) Iowa (7) LSU (4) Maryland	W 88–42; W 83–53; W 73–47; L 76–73
2015	#3	First Round; Second Round; Sweet Sixteen	(14) BYU (6) South Florida (7) Dayton	W 86–53; W 60–52; L 82–66
2016	#3	First Round; Second Round	(14) Central Arkansas (6) DePaul	W 87–60; L 73–72
2017	#4	First Round; Second Round; Sweet Sixteen	(13) Chattanooga (5) Tennessee (1) Baylor	W 82–62; W 75–64; L 97–63
2018	#1	First Round; Second Round; Sweet Sixteen; Elite Eight; Final Four	(16) Boise State (8) Marquette (4) Stanford (6) Oregon State (1) Mississippi State	W 74–42; W 90–72; W 86–59; W 76–43; L 73–63 (OT)
2019	#1	First Round; Second Round; Sweet Sixteen; Elite Eight	(16) Robert Morris (8) Michigan (4) Oregon State (2) Connecticut	W 69–34; W 71–50; W 61–44; L 80–73
2021	#2	First Round; Second Round; Sweet Sixteen; Elite Eight	(15) Marist (7) Northwestern (6) Oregon (1) Stanford	W 74–43; W 62–53; W 60–42; L 63–78
2022	#1	First Round; Second Round; Sweet Sixteen; Elite Eight; Final Four	(16) Albany (9) Gonzaga (4) Tennessee (3) Michigan (1) South Carolina	W 83–51; W 68–59; W 76–64; W 62–50; L 59–72
2023	#5	First Round; Second Round; Sweet Sixteen; Elite Eight	(12) Drake (4) Texas (8) Ole Miss (2) Iowa	W 83–81; W 73–51; W 72–62; L 83–97
2024	#6	First Round	(11) Middle Tennessee	L 69–71
2025	#7	First Round; Second Round	(10) Nebraska (2) TCU	W 63–58; L 70–85
2026	#3	First Round; Second Round; Sweet Sixteen	(14) Vermont (6) Alabama (2) Michigan	W 72–52; W 69–68; L 52–71

== Individual honors and notable players ==
=== Retired numbers ===
Louisville Cardinals retired numbers
No.	Player	Position	Career	Year of Retirement
35	Angel McCoughtry	F	2005-09	2010

== Roster ==
2026–27 Louisville Cardinals women's basketball team
Players
Coaches

Pos.	#	Name	Height	Year	Previous school	Hometown
G	1	Myah Epps	5 ft 10 in (1.78 m)	Fr	Homestead	Fort Wayne, IN
G	2	Imari Berry	5 ft 10 in (1.78 m)	Jr	Clarksville	Clarksville, TN
G	3	Zamareya Jones	5 ft 7 in (1.7 m)	Jr	NC State	Greenville, NC
F	4	Mackenly Randolph	6 ft 0 in (1.83 m)	Jr	Sierra Canyon	Los Angeles, CA
G	5	Ariyana Cradle	5 ft 10 in (1.78 m)	Fr	SPIRE Institute	Westerville, OH
F	10	Carys Baker	6 ft 2 in (1.88 m)	Sr	Virginia Tech	West Hartford, CT
F	11	Elif İstanbulluoğlu	6 ft 3 in (1.91 m)	Sr	Fenerbahçe S.K.	Istanbul, Turkey
G	15	Rebekah Graves	5 ft 6 in (1.68 m)	RS Jr	Keller	Keller, TX
G	21	Reagan Bender	5 ft 10 in (1.78 m)	Jr	Sacred Heart	Louisville, KY
G	22	Tajianna Roberts	5 ft 10 in (1.78 m)	Jr	IMG Academy	San Diego, CA
F	23	Ayse Melek Demirer	6 ft 4 in (1.93 m)	Fr	Ocean College	Istanbul, Turkey
F	24	Grace Mbugua	6 ft 4 in (1.93 m)	So	Danville Christian	Danville, KY
G	25	Deniya Prawl	6 ft 2 in (1.88 m)	So	Tennessee	Toronto, Ontario

Head coach

- Jeff Walz (Northern Kentucky)

Assistant coach(es)

- Jonneshia Pineda (Georgia Southwestern State) (AHC)
- Joanna Bernabei-McNamee (West Liberty)
- Mike Bradbury (Chattanooga)
- Roman Tubner (Centenary)
- Selim Aldag

Legend

- (C) Team captain
- (S) Suspended
- (I) Ineligible
- (W) Walk-on
- Injured
- Current redshirt

Roster
Last update: August 30, 2026
