= Ricky Barber =

American football player (born 2001)

No. 50 – Washington Commanders
- Position: Defensive tackle
- Roster status: Active

Personal information
- Born: May 7, 2001 (age 25)
- Listed height: 6 ft 3 in (1.91 m)
- Listed weight: 295 lb (134 kg)

Career information
- High school: Doss (Louisville, Kentucky)
- College: Western Kentucky (2019–2020); UCF (2021–2024)
- NFL draft: 2025: undrafted

Career history
- Washington Commanders (2025–present)

Awards and highlights
- First team All-AAC (2022)

Career NFL statistics as of 2025
- Tackles: 5
- Sacks: 1
- Stats at Pro Football Reference

Ricky Barber (born May 7, 2001) is an American professional football defensive tackle for the Washington Commanders of the National Football League (NFL). Barber played college football for the Western Kentucky Hilltoppers and UCF Knights. He signed with the Commanders as an undrafted free agent in 2025.

== Early life ==
Barber was born on May 7, 2001. He attended Doss High School in Louisville, Kentucky, where he played football as a defensive lineman, earning third-team all-state honors after recording 48 tackles as a junior in 2018. He then was named first-team all-state by USA Today, all-district and all-area as a senior in 2019. A three-star recruit, he committed to play college football for the Western Kentucky Hilltoppers.

== College career ==
Barber redshirted as a true freshman in 2019 after appearing in four games, then became a starter at Western Kentucky in 2020. In 2020, he posted 58 tackles, seven tackles-for-loss (TFLs) and four sacks, earning honorable mention All-Conference USA honors and being named to the Football Writers Association of America (FWAA) Freshman All-America team. After the 2020 season, Barber entered the NCAA transfer portal and transferred to UCF. He started 10 games for the Knights in 2022, recording 29 tackles, 5.5 TFLs and three sacks. In 2023, he started all 14 games and was named first-team All-American Athletic Conference (AAC) after recording 49 tackles. He was also named an honorable mention All-American by Pro Football Network (PFN). He had 34 tackles, six TFLs and 2.5 sacks in his final season, 2024. He was invited to the 2025 Hula Bowl.

== Professional career ==
Pre-draft measurables
Height	Weight	Arm length	Hand span	Wingspan	40-yard dash	10-yard split	20-yard split	Vertical jump	Broad jump
6 ft 1 1/8 in (1.86 m)	296 lb (134 kg)	33 1/4 in (0.84 m)	8 3/4 in (0.22 m)	6 ft 8 3/4 in (2.05 m)	5.20 s	1.78 s	3.00 s	30.0 in (0.76 m)	9 ft 1 in (2.77 m)
All values from Pro Day

After going unselected in the 2025 NFL draft, Barber signed with the Washington Commanders as an undrafted free agent on May 8, 2025. He was waived on August 26 as part of final roster cuts, but re-signed to the practice squad the following day. Barber was elevated to the active roster for the team's Week 17 game against the Dallas Cowboys and made his NFL debut in the game, posting five tackles and a sack.

On January 5, 2026, Barber signed a reserve/futures contract with the Commanders. On September 17, the Commanders waived Barber and re-signed him to their practice squad two days later. On November 4, he was signed to the active roster following the team placing both Daron Payne and Javon Kinlaw on injured reserve.
