= Medoro =

Medoro may refer to:

- Angelino Medoro (1567–1631), Italian painter
- Medoro from Angelica and Medoro, popular subject of many works of Romantic painters, composers and writers
- Medoro, pooldle from The Adventures of Pinocchio

== See also ==
- Medora (disambiguation)
