= Terry Hall (basketball) =

American college basketball coach (1944–1997)

Biographical details
- Born: November 30, 1944; Salem, Indiana, US
- Died: July 14, 1997 (aged 52); Jeffersonville, Indiana, US

Playing career
- 1963–1966: Indiana State Sycamores women's basketball

Coaching career (HC unless noted)
- 1969–1974: Butler High School (Louisville, Kentucky)
- 1974–1975: Eastern Kentucky
- 1975–1980: Louisville
- 1980–1987: Kentucky
- 1990–1997: Wright State

Accomplishments and honors

Championships
- 1984 SEC championship

Awards
- 1991–92 Northstar Conference Coach of the Year

Teresa A. Hall (November 30, 1944 – July 14, 1997) was an American women's basketball coach and player. She coached at Eastern Kentucky, Louisville, Kentucky and Wright State.

== Early life ==
Hall was born in Salem, Indiana and was eldest of three girls. She attended Salem High School and joined the Girls Athletic Association, and organization for women's high school sports prior to Title IX.

She attended Indiana State University and obtained a degree in Health, Physical Education, and Recreation. At ISU, she played tennis, basketball, volleyball, badminton and field hockey.

Upon graduation, she took a position as a physical education teacher at West Washington High School in Campbellsburg, Indiana then at Butler High School in Louisville, Kentucky.

== Eastern Kentucky ==
Hall left Butler in 1974 to pursue a master's degree in physical education at Eastern Kentucky University. While there, she also took an interim position coaching the Eastern Kentucky Colonels women's basketball team for one season. She led the team to a 14–6 record and won the Kentucky Women's Intercollegiate Conference tournament, beating the University of Kentucky in the championship game.

== University of Louisville ==
She was then hired to coach the Louisville Cardinals women's basketball team, initially on a part-time basis, and eventually full time. She posted a 79–54 record in five seasons.

== University of Kentucky ==
Hall started her first season with returning players Valerie Still, Lea Wise, and Patty Jo Hedges and had a 25–6 overall record for that season and an 11th national ranking.

Her second season was capped with a 19–7 regular season record and a victory over the Tennessee Lady Volunteers basketball in the SEC Tournament. They were defeated in the 1982 NCAA Division I women's basketball tournament in the final eight.

After the 1986–87 team went finished 17–11, she was fired by the University of Kentucky.

== Out of coaching ==
After leaving UK, in 1987, she stayed in Lexington as a stockbroker and also had a college scouting service.

== Wright State ==
Wright State University was transitioning from NCAA Division II to NCAA Division I and hired Hall to lead the Wright State Raiders women's basketball team. After three seasons, she was diagnosed with ovarian cancer.

She continued to coach while undergoing cancer treatments before having to resign in early 1997.

== Death ==
Terry Hall died on July 14, 1997, at Clark Memorial Hospital in Jeffersonville, Indiana.
