= Colonial Gardens =

Restaurant complex and local landmark in Louisville, Kentucky, US

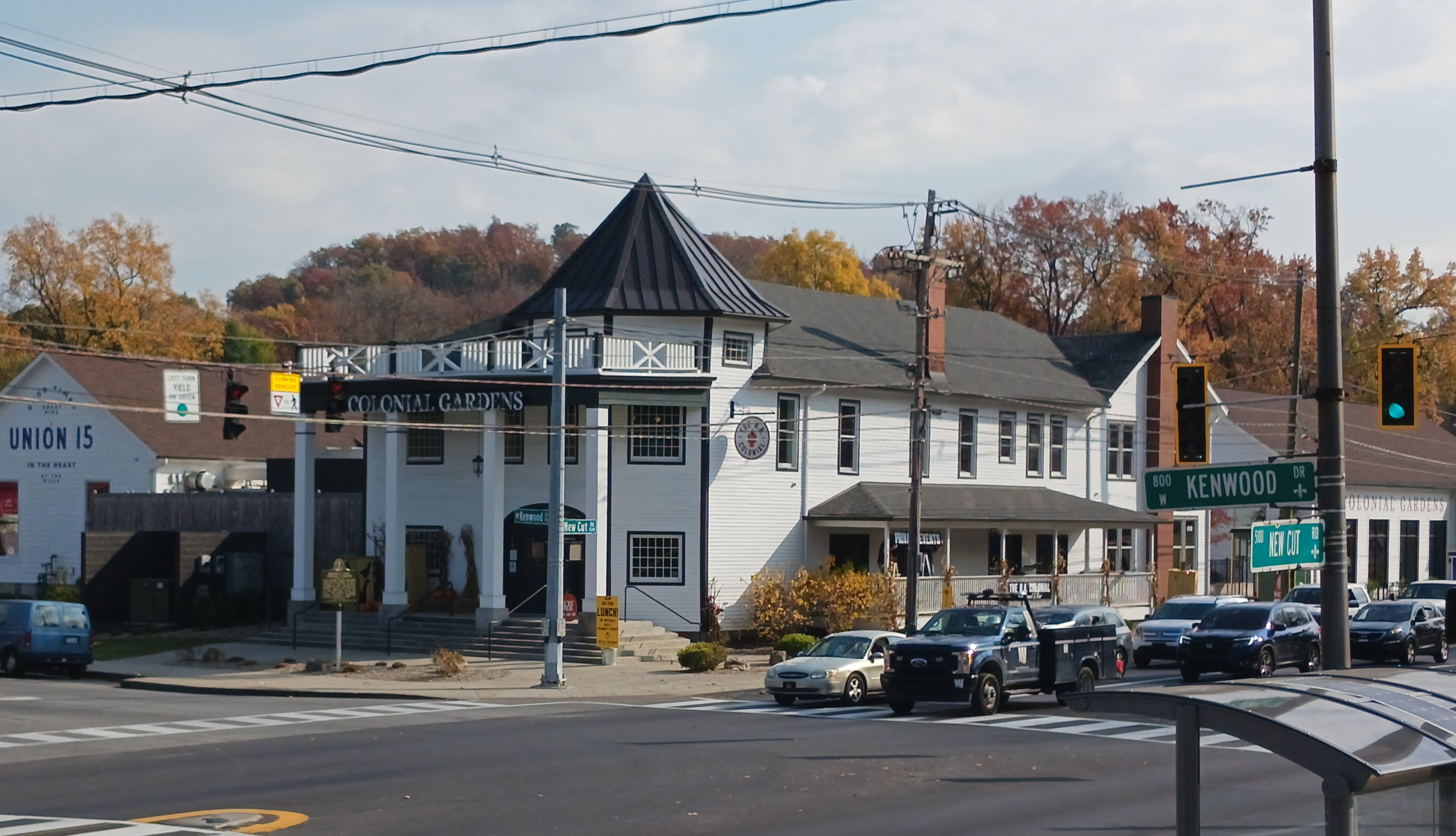
- Colonial Gardens in 2023 (Note: After completed 2021 renovation of the main building and earlier addition of three other site buildings (two shown here))
- Interactive map of the Colonial Gardens area
- Former names: Senning's Park; Teen Bar; Carl's Bar

General information
- Architectural style: Colonial Revival (Note: Applies to main building only)
- Location: 818 W. Kenwood Drive; Louisville, Kentucky, 40214
- Coordinates: 38°09′40.7″N 85°46′43.7″W
- Completed: 1902
- Renovated: 2017–2021
- Owner: Underhill Associates

Technical details
- Floor count: 2 (main building); 1 (other site buildings)

Other information
- Number of restaurants: 5
- Public transit: TARC

Website
- colonialgardenslouky.com

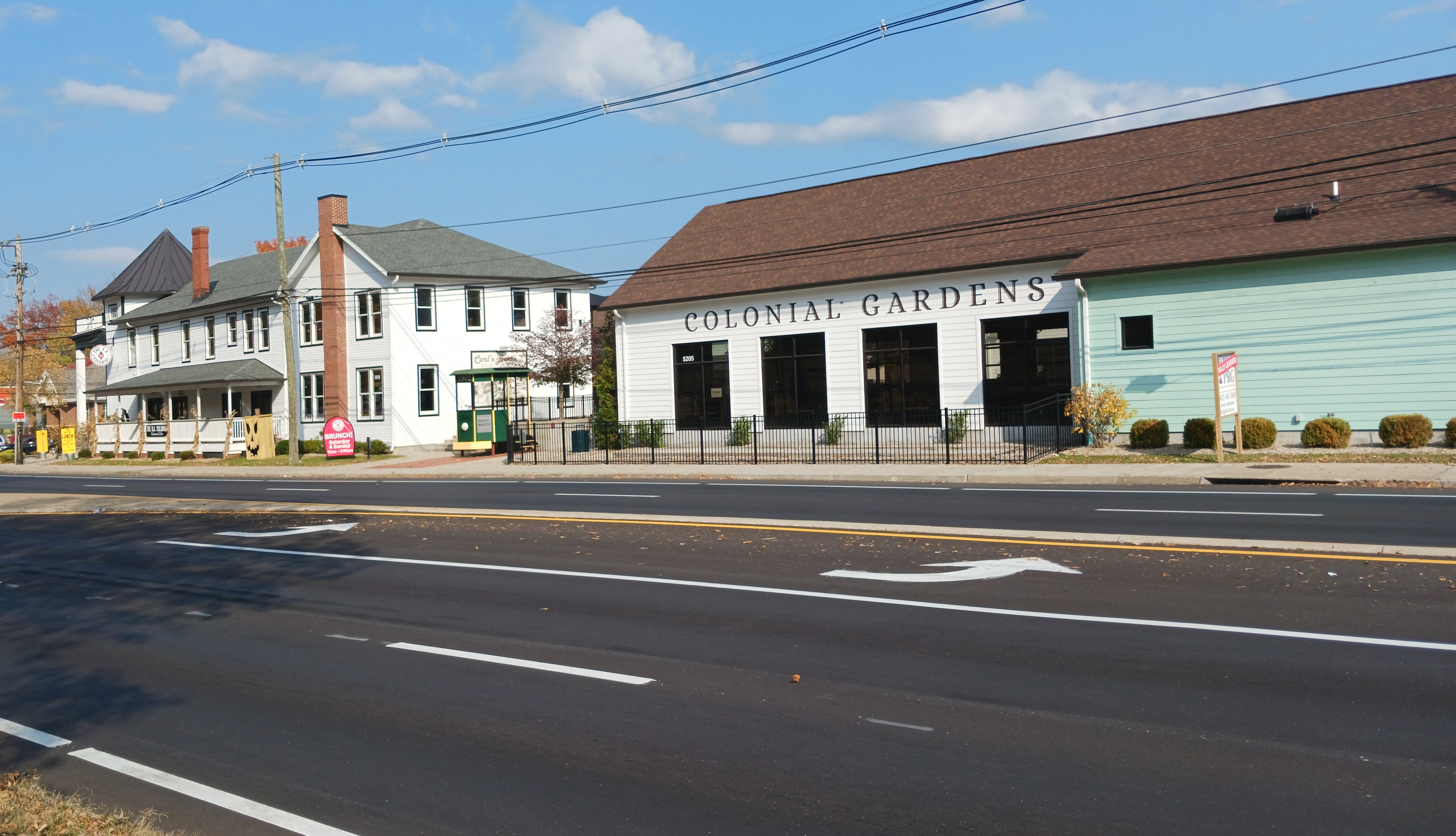
Side view of Colonial Gardens along New Cut Road

Colonial Gardens is a restaurant complex and local landmark located in the Kenwood Hill neighborhood of Louisville, Kentucky, across New Cut Road from Iroquois Park. It was formerly an entertainment complex, and in its earliest existence, a part of Senning's Park, the site of the first zoo in Louisville.

== History ==
=== Origin in Senning's Park ===
Senning's Park was started in 1902 by a German immigrant to Louisville from Kesse, Germany named Frederick Carl Senning, who immigrated to the city in 1868. Prior to opening the park, he and his wife Minnie founded the Senning Hotel at 2nd and Jefferson in downtown Louisville, as well as the first bowling alley in Louisville, at the corner of 8th and Main, also in downtown.

The park started on two and a half acres owned by Fredrika Oswald before he died. It benefited from being only a block from the loop that electric streetcars used for the Fourth Street route. Initially it did not have a zoo, but instead focused on dancing and dining; picnics and political rallies were common at the facility.

The zoo was started during the Prohibition era, and barely survived the Great Depression. In 1920, the Sennings' son William began the zoo operations, with his parents going on a trip to Europe. Animals present in the zoo included alligators, bears, deer, exotic birds, leopards, lions, monkeys, ostriches (for riding), and tigers. However, the keep of the exotic animals became expensive, and in 1939 the park was closed due to Frederick Senning's death. The park was sold at auction for $15,000 the following year. The new owner, B. A. Watson, opened a restaurant on the property called Colonial Gardens, and promptly closed the zoo. Its successor, the current Louisville Zoo, would not open until 1969.

=== Entertainment complex (1940–2003) ===
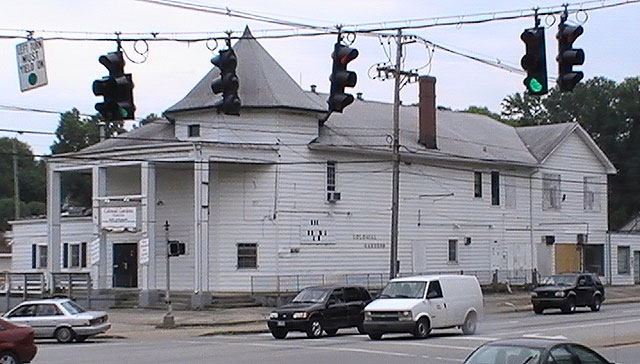
Colonial Gardens c. 2008 (Note: Basically how the building appeared when last used as an entertainment complex, and several years before renovations began)

Colonial Gardens featured big bands during the 1940s. However, it had its own difficulties as well; it lost its right to sell rationed foods in 1944, and was found to have an illegal gambling device on the premises on January 13, 1948. A fire on August 16, 1950, caused $10,000 in damages.

In the 1950s the property was purchased by Herm Schmid, who renamed it the Teen Bar, a strictly non-alcoholic venue popular with South End teenagers and known for hosting dancing and jitterbug contests. In 1956 it was sold again and renamed Carl's Bar. Popular bands that performed during the 1950s and 1960s included the Sultans and the Monarchs. Local oral history also holds that in November 1956, while in town for performances at the Jefferson County Armory, Elvis Presley had an unscheduled performance at Carl's Bar, as it was close to the home of his grandparents, whom he was visiting at the time.

The last business operating in this version of Colonial Gardens closed in 2003, and the building was then abandoned by its owners.

=== Landmark designation and reconstruction (2008–) ===
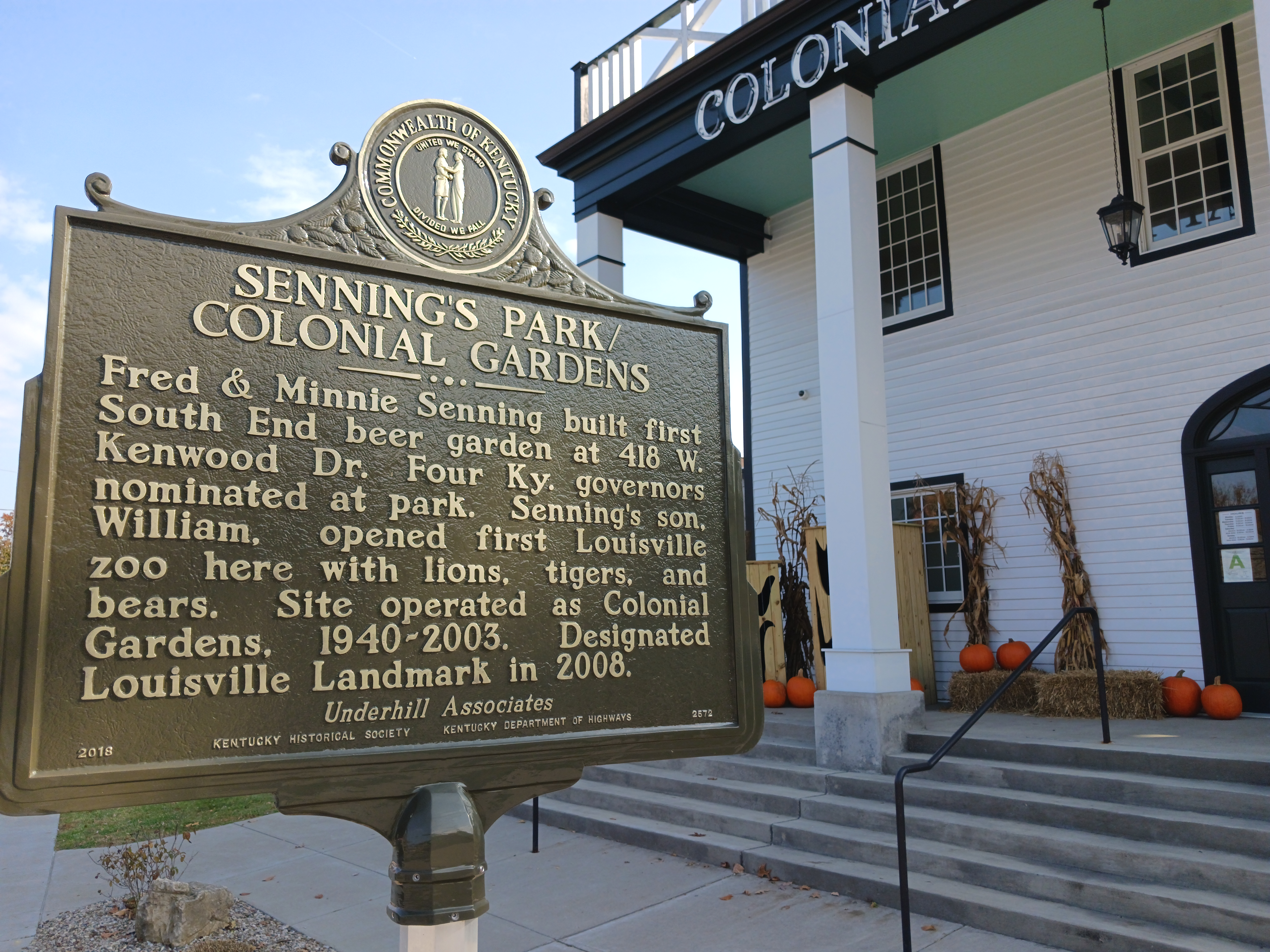
Historical marker for Sennings Park/Colonial Gardens

By mid-2008, Colonial Gardens was in danger of being demolished by investors interested in developing the property. In hopes of saving the building, a petition to declare the building and adjacent property an "Individual Local Landmark" was begun simultaneously. One rationale for the petition, among several other historical distinctions, was the fact that the building was the last of the beer gardens that once dominated the South end of Louisville. On November 20, 2008, the petition was passed, and the Louisville Metro Landmarks Commission named Colonial Gardens an Individual Local Landmark.

In 2012, Louisville Metro Council member David Yates proposed an ordinance to change how the commission designates an individual local landmark, so residents in the immediate vicinity of the property in question would have more input in the commission's decisions, such as the one regarding Colonial Gardens. The ordinance also would give the council final decision authority. In August, the ordinance was passed 18–7 over Mayor Greg Fischer's veto.

In June 2013, in a 16–3 vote, the Metro Council approved an ordinance allowing the city to purchase the Colonial Gardens property. The city subsequently sold the property to local developer Underhill Associates for $1 and gave $1.2 million toward the property's redevelopment.

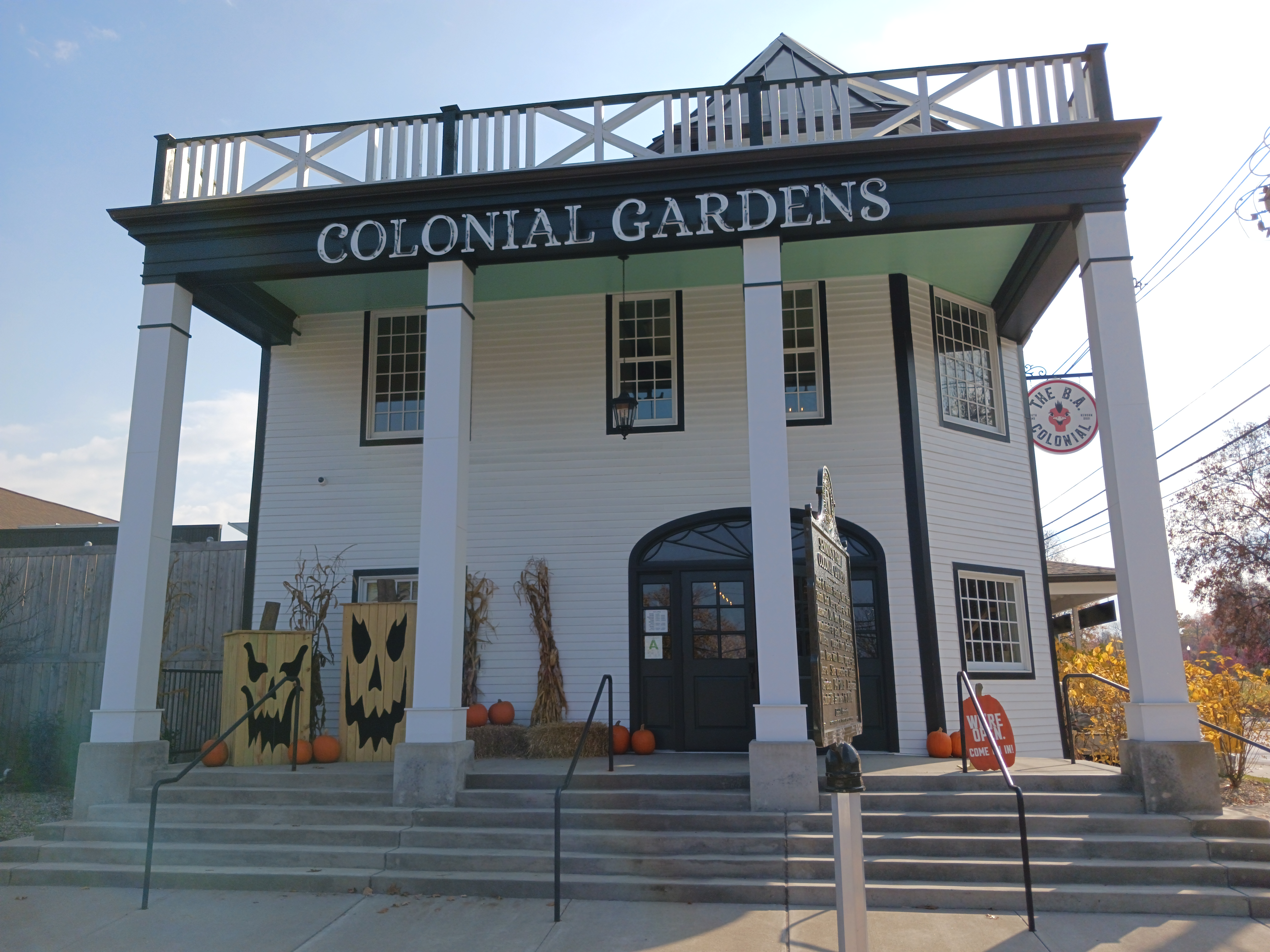
Front of Colonial Gardens main building, which houses the restaurant The B.A. Colonial

In 2017, Underhill Associates began construction on the $5 million redevelopment of Colonial Gardens and surrounding property, including renovating 7,000 square feet (650 m^{2}) in the original building, demolishing a 1939 addition, and building three new one-story buildings. These buildings would be used to house three additional restaurants, which the developer preferred to be locally owned and mid-priced. In May 2019, the first two restaurants were planning to open in June 2019, though this was delayed to August. In April 2021, the last restaurant B.A. Colonial which was named after the second owner B.A. Watson opened its doors in the original corner building completing the project and carrying on the rich traditions of the South End and the historic property.

== See also ==
- Iroquois, Louisville
- Little Loomhouse
- List of attractions and events in the Louisville metropolitan area
