= Butler Traditional High School =

Coordinates: 38°11′35.91″N 85°48′57.42″W

Suda E. Butler Traditional High School

Location
- 2222 Crums Lane; Louisville, Kentucky; United States

Information
- Type: Public Secondary
- Motto: "Have a great Butler day and remember to always do the right thing."
- Established: 1954
- School district: Jefferson County Public Schools
- Principal: William Allen
- Teaching staff: 80.96 (FTE)
- Grades: 9–12
- Enrollment: 1,406 (2023–2024)
- Student to teacher ratio: 17.37
- Campus: Urban
- Colors: Red and white
- Mascot: Bear
- Rival: Pleasure Ridge Park High School
- Yearbook: The Den
- Website: schools.jefferson.kyschools.us/High/Butler/

Butler Traditional High School is a high school in Louisville, Kentucky, United States.

== History ==
Suda E. Butler High School opened in 1954. It was chosen in 1988 as the second high school in Jefferson County to offer the Traditional Program. In this program the standards of patriotism, morality, and personal integrity are stressed in a structured learning environment. The school has a strict dress code, discipline code, heterogeneous grouping, technology major, and college preparatory curriculum. It is the only school in JCPS to obtain and/or exceed its goal for CATS testing every year during the existence of the yearly examinations. They recently, in the 2009–2010 school year, added the Freshman Academy to their school. Within the next two or three years they plan on changing from the traditional semester to trimester schedule.

In 2009 it was a Host School for Superintendent Sheldon Burman's Superintendent's Student Advisory Council to discuss how JCPS can better prepare high schoolers for life after high school.

Butler Traditional won the Top School Award (WLKY's High School Cribs) in Kentuckiana from WLKY News 32 in 2007. It was also featured on WLKY High School Cribs again in 2009.

== Sports ==
- Football- Varsity/Junior Varsity/Freshman (2011 District and Regional Champions, 1970 AAA State Champs, 1979 4A State Champs)
- Boys Soccer (2007 and 2008 District Champions)
- Girls Soccer
- Field Hockey
- Swim Team
- Boys Basketball (1981/2009/2010 6th Region Champions)
- Girls Basketball (1975/1980/2008/2014/2016 Class 4A State Champions)
- Baseball
- Girls Softball
- Girls Volleyball
- Cross Country (2017 State Champions)
- Track
- Tennis
- Cheerleading (2005 and 2009 State Champions)
- Step Team
- Dance Team (2014 & 2015 state champions)
- Golf
- Bowling (2009 District Champions A-Team)

== Notable alumni and faculty ==
- John Bell, Senator, Virginia General Assembly
- Lance Burton, master magician
- Jeff Caldwell, NFL wide receiver for the Kansas City Chiefs
- Adam Duvall, Major League Baseball outfielder
- Terry Hall, women's basketball coach at University of Louisville and University of Kentucky
- Adrienne Johnson, former WNBA player
- Bryce Jones, television meteorologist at WDRB News
- Jodie Mudd, former PGA golfer
- Dale Romans, horse trainer (2011 Preakness winner)
- John Wesley Shipp, television and movie actor
- Chris Smith, Major League Baseball pitcher
- Jordan Watkins, current NFL and former college football wide receiver
- Jared Wolfe, Pro Golfer

== See also ==
- Public schools in Louisville, Kentucky
