= Kenwood Hill, Louisville =

Hill and neighborhood on the south side of Louisville, Kentucky

Coordinates: 38.15620°N 85.77220°W

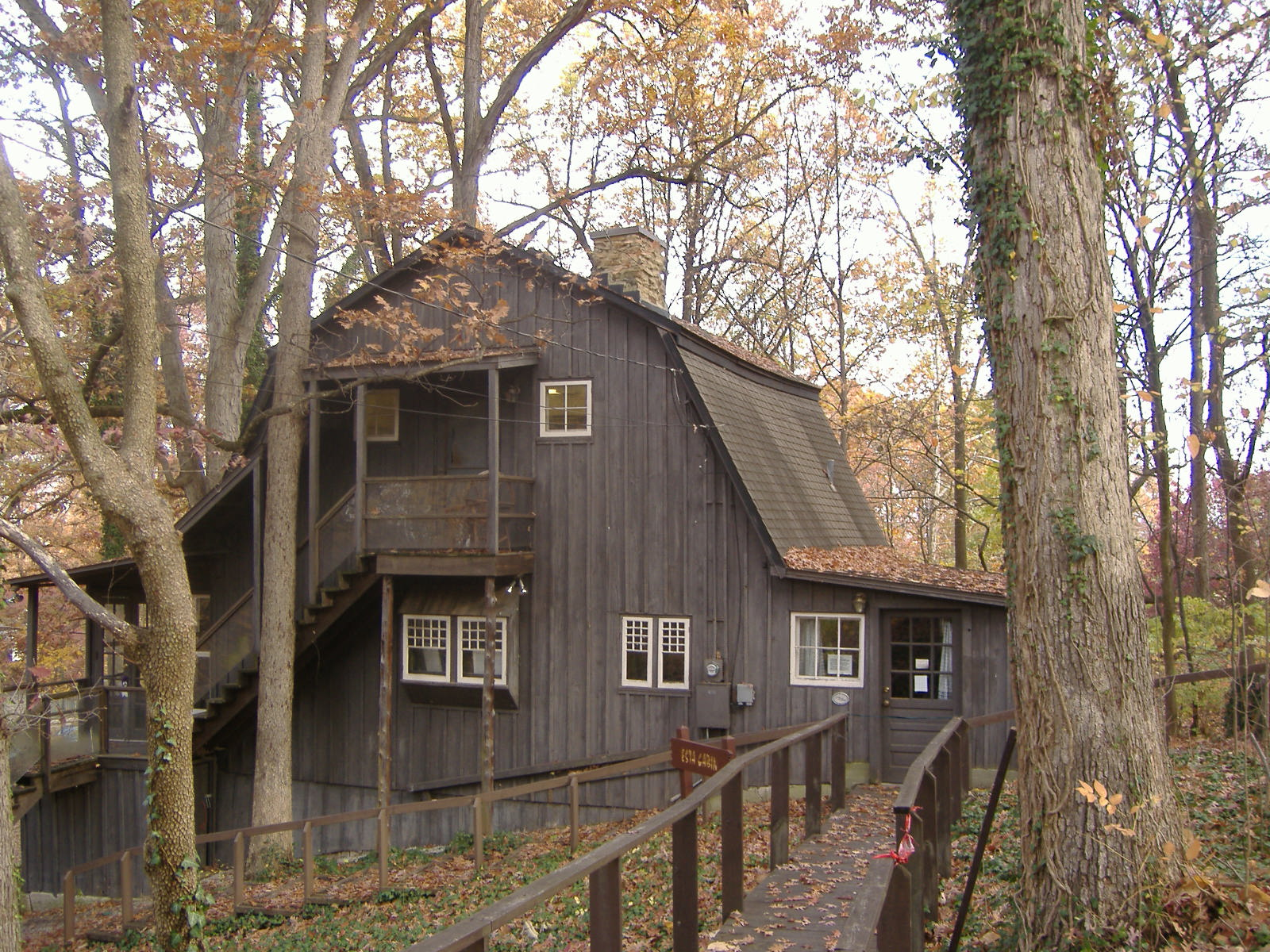
The Esta Cabin at the Little Loomhouse on Kenwood Hill, where the song "Happy Birthday to You" was first sung

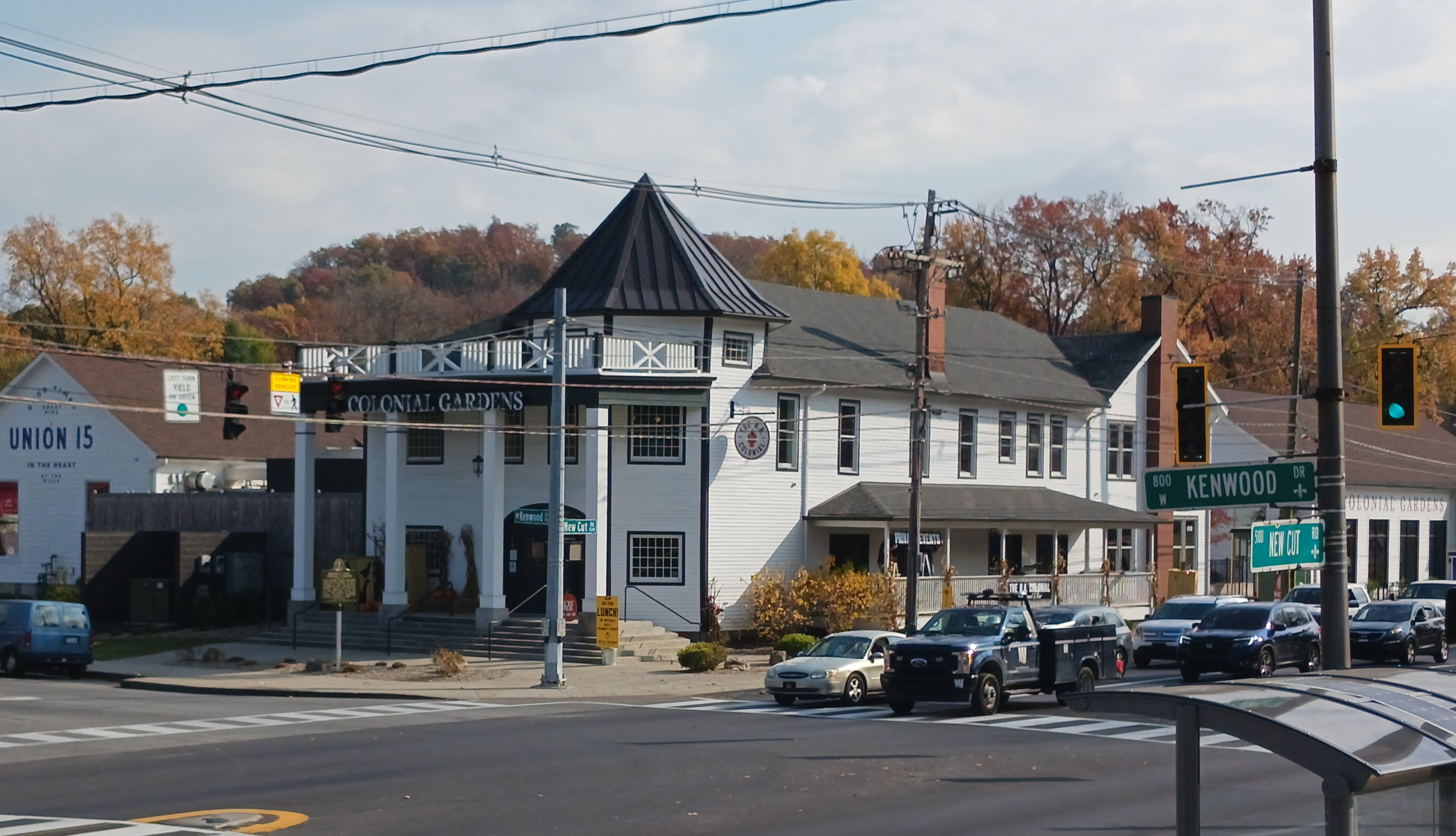
Colonial Gardens, a restaurant complex that sits at the northwest corner of the neighborhood

Kenwood Hill is a hill and neighborhood on the south side of Louisville, Kentucky, United States. Its boundaries are New Cut Road (alongside Iroquois Park), Kenwood Drive, Southside Drive and Palatka Road. The hill, earlier known as Sunshine Hill and then Cox's Knob, was used by Native Americans to spot buffalo. By 1868 Benoni Figg owned the area as a part of his charcoal business. His family oversaw development on the land until it was sold in 1890 to a development company which named the area Kenwood Hill. Southern Parkway (initially called Grand Boulevard) was opened soon after in 1893.

In 1893, Kenwood Hill residents Patty and Mildred J. Hill composed the song "Good Morning to All", which was to become "Happy Birthday to You".

While wealthy Louisvillians built summer homes in the area, and the first subdivision did not begin until 1942, the neighborhood was widely developed by the 1960s, so much so that extensive work was needed to halt erosion on the hill in the 1980s.

== See also ==
- Iroquois, Louisville
- Colonial Gardens
- Little Loomhouse
