= Iroquois, Louisville =

Neighborhood in Louisville, Kentucky

Coordinates: 38°10′11″N 85°46′53″W

Iroquois is a neighborhood on the south side of Louisville, Kentucky, United States. It is split into two parts by Beechmont. From a historical perspective, the northwestern section would be the Bryn Mawr neighborhood and the southeastern section would be the Kenwood neighborhood. The Iroquois neighborhood is roughly bounded by Hazelwood Avenue, Beechmont, Third Street, Kenwood Drive, and Iroquois Park. Located near the Louisville International Airport, residents have frequently complained of noise and challenged airport expansion. The largely residential neighborhood was developed as a suburb after World War II and into the 1950s.

The notorious Iroquois Tenement Housing Complex was torn down in 2012 and replaced with the Hope Garden Project, an urban farming collaboration involving KentuckyOne Health, the Food Literacy Project and the Metro Housing Authority.

Iroquois has a lending library, a branch of the Louisville Free Public Library.

Notable residents include musician Bryson Tiller.

== See also ==
- Kenwood Hill, Louisville
- Colonial Gardens
