= Iroquois Park =

Municipal park in Louisville, Kentucky, United States

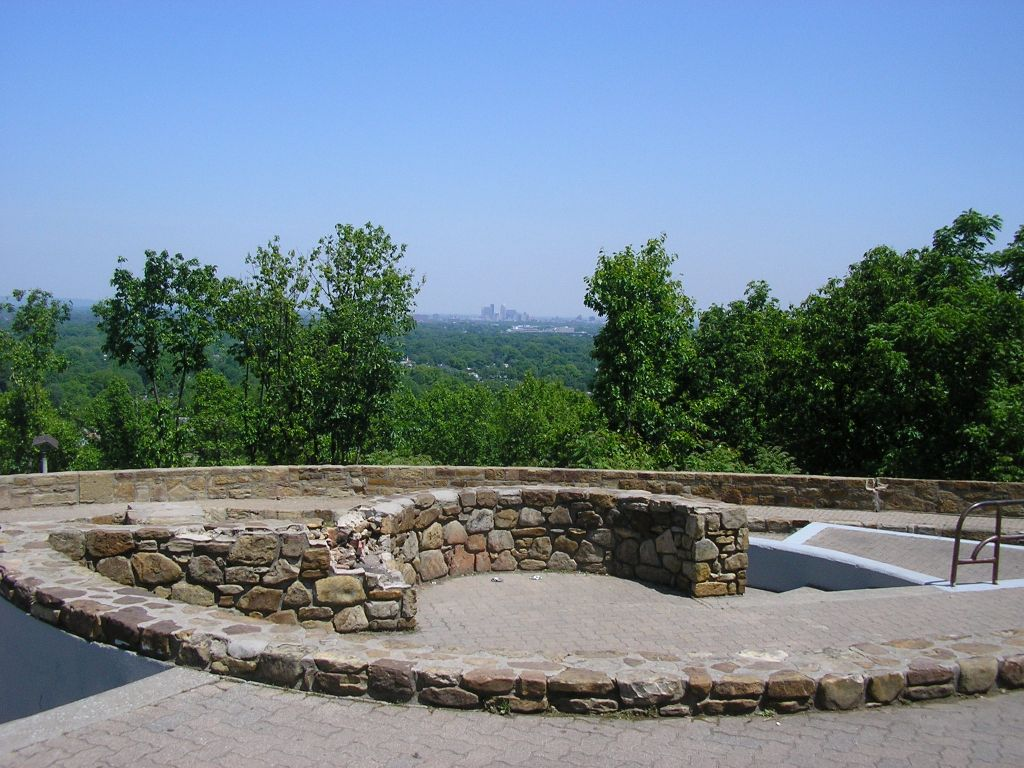
- View of Downtown Louisville from the overlook atop Iroquois Park
- Interactive map of Iroquois Park
- Type: Urban park
- Location: 5216 New Cut Road, Louisville, Kentucky
- Coordinates: 38.160006°N 85.780221°W
- Area: 725 acres (2.93 km^{2})
- Created: 1888
- Operator: Louisville Metro Parks
- Status: Open
- Website: louisvilleky.gov/government/parks/park-list/iroquois-park

Iroquois Park is a 725-acre (2.93 km^{2}) municipal park in Louisville, Kentucky, United States. It was designed by Frederick Law Olmsted, who also designed Louisville's Cherokee Park and Shawnee Park, at what were then the edges of the city. Located south of downtown, Iroquois Park was promoted as "Louisville's Yellowstone". It is built on a large knob covered with old-growth forest, and its most prominent feature are the scenic viewpoints atop the hill. The park features an amphitheater, basketball courts, an 18-hole golf course, a disc golf course, and a riding stable.

== History ==
Iroquois Park was one of the three major suburban parks created in the late 19th century in Louisville. In 1889, Mayor Charles Donald Jacob purchased Burnt Knob, a 313-acre (1.27 km^{2}) tract of land 4 miles (6.4 km) south of the city, for $9,000, and was reimbursed by the city treasurer without approval from the city council or public referendum, meaning the original purchase was probably illegal. Jacob also negotiated with landowners between the city and the then-rural park to acquire the right of way for a 150-foot (46 m) wide "Grand Boulevard", today's Southern Parkway, which still leads to the park.

The move was controversial at first and called "Jacob's Folly" by political opponents after early improvements were washed away by rain in the Spring of 1889. In 1890, control over the park, then called Jacob's Park, was given to the Board of Park Commissioners. Frederick Law Olmsted was invited to tour the park, and gave an influential speech at the Pendennis Club on May 20, 1891. Two days later, he signed a contract to design the city's park system, which also led to the creation of Cherokee and Shawnee Parks. Work was soon underway on the southern park, by then renamed Iroquois, which Olmsted envisioned as "providing the grandeur of the forest depths in the dim seclusion of which you may wander musingly for hours".

== Features ==
Located south of downtown, Iroquois Park was promoted as "Louisville's Yellowstone". Iroquois Park is built on a large knob covered with old-growth forest, and its most prominent feature are the scenic viewpoints atop the hill. The summit of Iroquois Park presents an all-at-once vista of the city of Louisville, seen from the south. A bronze plaque at the site demonstrates the plan of the city's park and parkway system as planned and executed by Olmsted's firm.

The park features an amphitheater, basketball courts, 18-hole golf course, a disc golf course and a riding stable. Louisville Metro Parks and partner companies stage concerts, musicals, and other shows at Iroquois Amphitheater.

== See also ==
- Performing arts in Louisville, Kentucky
- Iroquois, Louisville
- Kenwood Hill, Louisville
- Little Loomhouse
- Colonial Gardens
- City of Parks
- History of Louisville, Kentucky
- List of attractions and events in the Louisville metropolitan area
- List of parks in the Louisville metropolitan area
- Haudenosaunee
