= The Corsair =

1814 long tale in verse written by Lord Byron

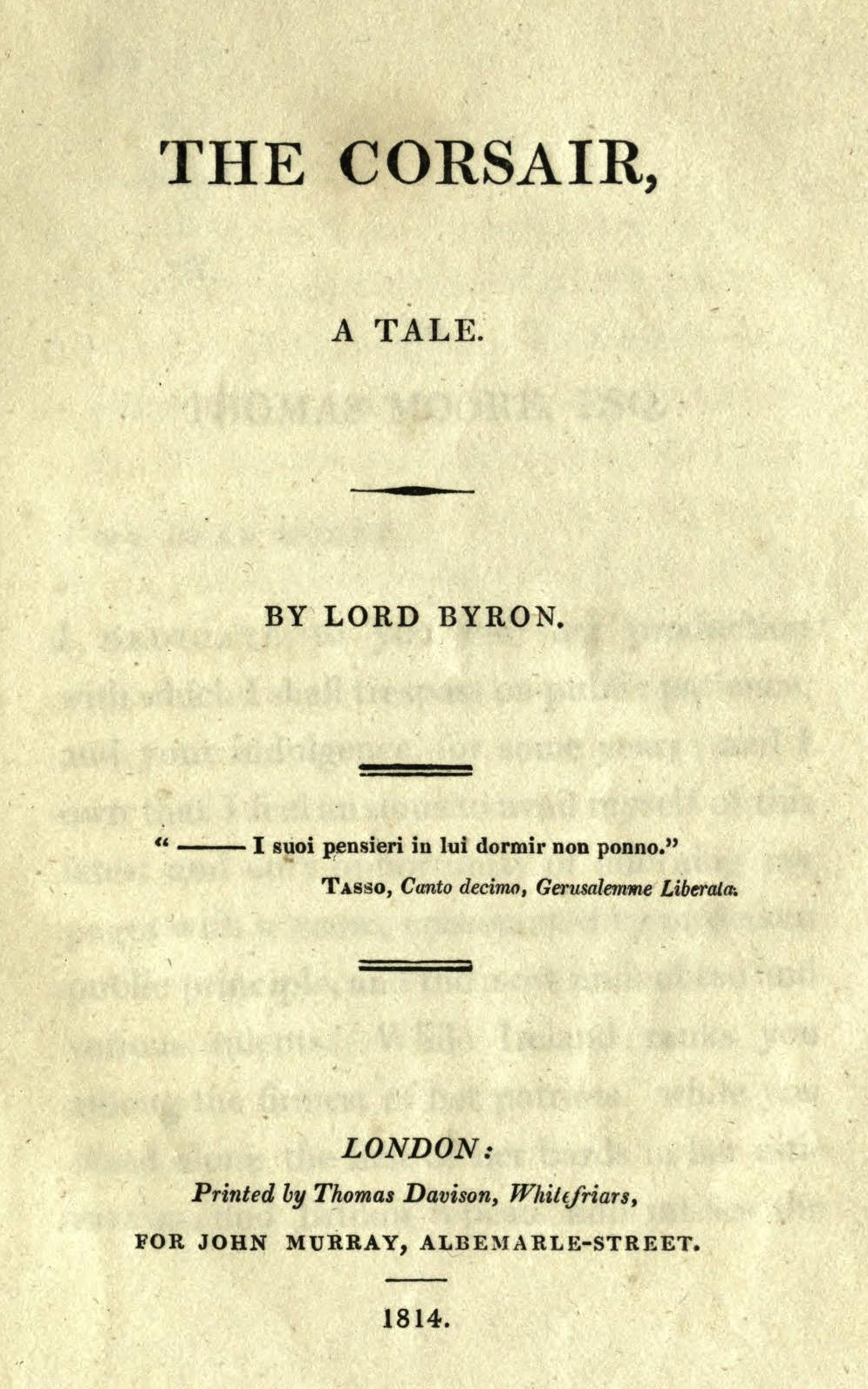
First edition title page

The Corsair (1814) is a long tale in verse written by Lord Byron (see 1814 in poetry) and published by John Murray in London. There were seven editions of the work within the year. It was extremely popular, selling ten thousand copies on its first day of sale, and was influential throughout the following century, inspiring operas, music and ballet. The 180-page work was dedicated to Irish poet Thomas Moore.

The story centers on Conrad, a cynical, mysterious pirate captain, a "Byronic hero", who leads a daring raid against a Turkish Pacha, Seyd. He is captured but is rescued by a captive named Gulnare, whom he later rejects after his wife, Medora, dies of grief.

== Background ==
The poem, divided into 3 cantos, narrates the story of the corsair or privateer Conrad. The tale narrates how the youth was rejected by society because of his acts and his war against humanity (excepting women). In this 180-page tale, the figure of the Byronic hero emerges, "that man of loneliness and mystery" who perceives himself a "villain", an anti-hero.

Many Americans believed the poem was based on the life of the French privateer or pirate Jean Lafitte.

In 1815, Conrad and Medora; Or, The Pirates' Isle; A Pathetic Narrative from "The Corsair," of Lord Byron by Robert Edgar was published in London by Dean and Munday, Threadneedle Street, sold for six pence.

In 1850, a chapbook of the tale was published in London by Thomas Redriffe as The Pirate's Isle.

== Summary ==
The plot focuses on Conrad, a corsair, a pirate or privateer. The first canto recounts Conrad's plan to attack the Pacha Seyd and seize his possessions. Conrad's wife, Medora, however, is determined to convince him to abandon his plan and not to embark on the mission. He sails from his island in the Aegean Sea to attack the pacha on another island.

The second canto describes the attack. Disguised, Conrad and his brigands begin their assault against Pacha Seyd, which goes according to plan. But then Conrad hears the cries of the women in the pacha's harem, so he tries to free them. This change from the original plan enables the pacha's forces to mount a successful counterattack. They kill most of the attackers and imprison Conrad. Gulnare, the pacha's slave, secretly goes to Conrad's cell, where she tells him that, in gratitude for his attempt to save her and the other women, she will try to save him.

In the third and final canto, Gulnare initiates the escape plan by trying to trick Seyd into freeing Conrad. When this fails, the pacha threatens to kill both her and Conrad. Gulnare tries to convince Conrad to kill Seyd and arranges for a knife to be taken to his cell, but Conrad refuses to kill him in cold blood without a fair fight.

Gulnare therefore kills the pacha herself. She and Conrad escape, successfully reaching his island. Conrad learns that his wife, Medora, believing Conrad had died in Seyd's counterattack, has died of grief. In the final scene, Conrad departs from the island alone, without Gulnare:

He left a Corsair's name to other times,
Linked with one virtue and a thousand crimes.

== Influence ==
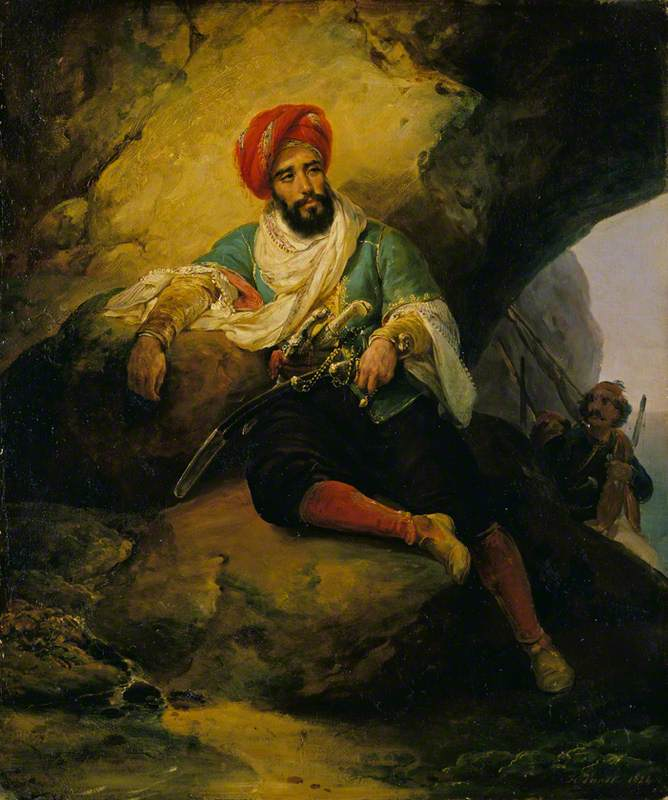
Conrad the Corsair by Horace Vernet, 1824

The Corsair was adapted for or inspired numerous other works in a variety of genres, although Byron did not live long enough to know about most of them.

In music, the poem was the basis for the grand opera The Pacha's Bridal (1836), with music by Francis Romer and a libretto by Mark Lemon; the opera Il corsaro (1848) by Giuseppe Verdi; and the ballet Le Corsaire (1856) by Adolphe Adam. The poem inspired the overture Le Corsaire (1845) by Hector Berlioz, and in 1908 Edward Elgar composed the song "Deep in My Soul" in 1908 with lines from The Corsair.

Horace Vernet produced an 1824 painting Conrad the Corsair, now in the Wallace Collection. French painter Eugène Delacroix depicted a scene from the work in a watercolor, Episode from The Corsair (1831), which shows Gulnare visiting the imprisoned Conrad in his cell. In 1815, Henry Fuseli sketched Conrad Rescues Gulnare. Henry Singleton and Richard Corbould also produced paintings based on the work.

In 1840, American editor and author N. P. Willis named his new periodical The Corsair after Byron's poem.

Lizzie Eustace, the main character of The Eustace Diamonds, the third installment of Anthony Trollope's Palliser novels, is described during the first half of the book as having "a volume of Byron in her hand, - the Corsair, Lara, and the Giaour." From then on she has recurrent fantasies of being swept off her feet by a fearless, dashing man, both dominating and tender, who is always referred to as her "Corsair." These hopes soon coalesce around Lord George de Bruce Carruthers. "Lizzie thought that perhaps he might be the Corsair whom, sooner or later in her life, she must certainly encounter." Eventually the novel's narration begins calling Lord George the "Corsair" as an alternative to using his actual name; chapter 63, for example, bears the (ironic) title "The Corsair is Afraid."

== Sources ==
- Drucker, Peter. 'Byron and Ottoman love: Orientalism, Europeanization and same sex sexualities in the early nineteenth-century Levant' (Journal of European Studies, vol. 42 no. 2, June 2012, 140–57).
- Garrett, Martin: George Gordon, Lord Byron. (British Library Writers' Lives). London: British Library, 2000. ISBN 0-7123-4657-0.
- Garrett, Martin. Palgrave Literary Dictionary of Byron. Palgrave, 2010. ISBN 978-0-230-00897-7.
- Guiccioli, Teresa, contessa di, Lord Byron's Life in Italy, transl. Michael Rees, ed. Peter Cochran, 2005, ISBN 0-87413-716-0.
- Grosskurth, Phyllis: Byron: The Flawed Angel. Hodder, 1997. ISBN 0-340-60753-X.
- McGann, Jerome: Byron and Romanticism. Cambridge: Cambridge University Press, 2002. ISBN 0-521-00722-4.
- Mole, Tom. (April 2006). "'Nourished by that Abstinence’: Consumption and Control in The Corsair'." Romanticism, Volume 12, Issue 1.
- Oueijan, Naji B. A Compendium of Eastern Elements in Byron's Oriental Tales. New York: Peter Lang Publishing, 1999.
- Ramsay, Jack C. (1996), Jean Laffite: Prince of Pirates, Eakin Press, ISBN 978-1-57168-029-7
- Rosen, Fred: Bentham, Byron and Greece. Clarendon Press, Oxford, 1992. ISBN 0-19-820078-1.
