= Medora, Louisville =

Neighborhood in Louisville, Kentucky

Medora is a neighborhood of Louisville, Kentucky, centered along Pendleton Road and Medora Road.

== Geography ==
Medora is located at 38°3′12″N 85°52′13″W.
