= Fairdale, Louisville =

Human settlement in Louisville, Kentucky, United States of America

Fairdale is a former census-designated place in southern Jefferson County, Kentucky, United States. The population was 7,658 at the 2000 census. In 2003, the area was annexed to the city of Louisville due to a merger between the city and Jefferson County's unincorporated community. Fairdale is now a neighborhood within the city limits of Louisville. The ZIP Code for Fairdale is 40118.

It is within the boundaries of the Fairdale Fire Protection District, which serves Fairdale and surrounding areas, including the large Jefferson Memorial Forest.

== Geography ==
Fairdale is located at 38°06′18″N 85°45′32″W. It is in southern Jefferson County.

According to the United States Census Bureau, the Census Designated Place (CDP) has a total area of 14.84 km^{2} (5.73 sq mi), all land.

=== Climate ===
The climate in this area is characterized by hot, humid summers and generally mild to cool winters. According to the Köppen Climate Classification system, Fairdale has a humid subtropical climate, abbreviated "Cfa" on climate maps.

== Demographics ==
Historical population
Census	Pop.	Note	%±
1980	7,315		—
1990	6,563		−10.3%
2000	7,658		16.7%
US Census Bureau. "Census.gov"."

At the 2000 census there were 7,658 people in 2,948 households, including 2,154 families, in the CDP. The population density was 518.7 people/km^{2} (1,343 people/mi^{2}). There were 3,059 housing units at an average density of 207.2 units/km^{2} (537 units/mi^{2}). The racial makeup of the CDP was 96.8% White, 0.89% Black or African American, 0.38% Native American, 0.35% Asian, 0.01% Pacific Islander, 0.35% from other races, and 1.23% from two or more races. Hispanic or Latino of any race were 1.31%.

As of the 2020 Census, 24% of Fairdale's population is Hispanic.

Of the 2,948 households 36.4% had children under the age of 18 living with them, 50.4% married couples living together, 17.2% with a female householder with no husband present, and 26.9% were non-families. 21.0% of households were one person and 7.1% were one person aged 65 or older. The average household size was 2.60 and the average family size was 2.98.

The age distribution was 27.3% under the age of 18, 10.0% from 18 to 24, 31.6% from 25 to 44, 21.1% from 45 to 64, and 10.1% 65 or older. The median age was 33 years. For every 100 females, there were 95.2 males. For every 100 females age 18 and over, there were 91.1 males.

The median household income was $35,218 and the median family income was $40,545. Males had a median income of $31,407 versus $22,339 for females. The per capita income for the CDP was $16,275. About 11.2% of families, and 14.5% of the population were below the poverty line, including 18.4% of those under age 18 and 14.2% of those age 65 or over. 4.6% have a bachelor's degree or higher, 28.2% don't have a high school degree.

== Education ==
Fairdale has a lending library, a branch of the Louisville Free Public Library.
