= List of presidents of the University of Louisville =

== List of presidents of the University of Louisville ==
There have been 28 presidents and 8 interim presidents of what is (or was once a part of) the University of Louisville:

=== Jefferson Seminary (1813–29) ===
- Mann Butler 1813–16
- William Tompkins 1816–21
- Charles M. M'Crohan 1821–25
- Francis E. Goddard 1826–29

=== Louisville Collegiate Institute (1837–40) ===
- Benjamin F. Farnsworth 1837–38
- John Hopkins Harney 1838–40

=== Louisville College (1840–46) ===
- John Hopkins Harney 1840–44

=== Louisville Medical Institute (1837–1846) ===
- John Rowan 1837–42
- William Garvin 1842–43
- James Guthrie 1843–46

=== University of Louisville (1846–present) ===
The following persons served as president of the University of Louisville since 1846:

No.	Image	President	Term start	Term end	Ref.
1		Samuel Smith Nicholas	1846	1847	
2		James Guthrie	1847	1869	
3		Isaac Caldwell	1869	1886	
4		James Speed Pirtle	1886	1905	
5		Theodore L. Burnett	1905	1911	
6		David William Fairleigh	1911	1914	
7		Arthur Younger Ford	1914	1926	
8		George Colvin	1926	1928	
acting		John Letcher Patterson	1928	1929	
9		Raymond Asa Kent	1929	1943	
10		Einar William Jacobsen	1943	1946	
acting		Frederick William Stamm	1946	1947	
11		John Wilkinson Taylor	1947	1950	
acting		Eli Huston Brown III	1950	1951	
12		Philip Grant Davidson	1951	1968	
13		Woodrow Mann Strickler	1968	1972	
acting		William Ferdinand Ekstrom	1972	1973	
14		James Grier Miller	1973	1980	
acting		William Ferdinand Ekstrom	1980	1981	
15		Donald C. Swain	1981	June 30, 1995	
16		John W. Shumaker	July 1, 1995	June 14, 2002 (Note: Resigned to head the University of Tennessee.)	
acting		Carol Garrison	June 15, 2002	September 1, 2002 (Note: Resigned to head the University of Alabama at Birmingham.)	
acting		James R. Ramsey	September 2, 2002	November 14, 2002	
17		James R. Ramsey	November 14, 2002	July 27, 2016 (Note: Forced to resign as a result of several financial and athletic scandals.)	
acting		Neville G. Pinto	July 27, 2016	January 29, 2017 (Note: Resigned to head the University of Cincinnati.)	
interim		Gregory C. Postel	January 30, 2017	May 14, 2018	
18		Neeli Bendapudi	May 15, 2018	December 13, 2021 (Note: Resigned to head Pennsylvania State University.)	
interim		Lori Stewart Gonzalez	December 13, 2021	January 31, 2023	
19		Kim Schatzel	February 1, 2023	March 26, 2025 (Note: Schatzel resigned immediately without publicly stating a reason.)	
20		Gerry Bradley	March 26, 2025	Present	

Table notes:
