= Jefferson County Public Schools (Kentucky) =

School district in Kentucky, United States

Location
- Louisville, Jefferson County, Kentucky, 40218; United States

District information
- Type: Public
- Grades: Pre-K through 12
- Established: 1975
- Superintendent: Dr. Brian Yearwood
- Chair of the board: Corrie Shull
- Budget: $2.35 billion (2025–26)

Students and staff
- Students: 96,198 (2024–25)
- Teachers: 6,818
- Staff: 18,000 (2020–21)

Other information
- Website: jefferson.kyschools.us

Jefferson County Public Schools (JCPS) is a public school district in Jefferson County, Kentucky, United States, that operates all but one of the public schools in the county. It is governed by an elected seven-member board of education, which selects and hires a superintendent, who serves as the system's chief executive.

JCPS operates 169 schools with around 96,000 students, making it the 30th-largest school district in the U.S. In 2025–26 the system had a $2.35 billion budget and more than 18,000 employees. Jefferson County's population is about 780,000—by far the largest in Kentucky.

== Board of education ==
The seven members of the Jefferson County Board of Education (JCBE) are elected by general election to four-year terms. Each board member is responsible for an area of Jefferson County and the schools therein. The Superintendent, Brian Yearwood, serves as secretary to the board at all meetings. The current board members are (in order of district number) Gail Logan Strange, Tricia Lister, James Craig, Trevin Bass, Linda Duncan, Corrie Shull (Board Chair), and Taylor Everett.

== Schools ==
=== High school (grades 9–12) ===
- Atherton High School
- Butler Traditional High School
- Ballard High School
- Central High School
- Doss High School
- duPont Manual High School
- Eastern High School
- Fairdale High School
- Fern Creek High School
- Iroquois High School
- Jeffersontown High School
- Louisville Male High School
- Pleasure Ridge Park High School
- Seneca High School MCA
- Southern High School
- Valley Traditional High School
- Waggener High School
- Western High School

=== Middle school (grades 6–8) ===
- Barret Traditional Middle School
- Carrithers Middle School
- Conway Middle School
- Crosby Middle School
- Echo Trail Middle School
- Farnsley Middle School
- Highland Middle School
- Hudson Middle School
- Jefferson County Traditional Middle School
- Kammerer Middle School
- Knight Middle School
- Lassiter Middle School
- Meyzeek Middle School
- Newburg Middle School
- Noe Middle School
- Olmstead Academy North (all-boys)
- Olmstead Academy South (all-girls)
- Ramsey Middle School
- Stuart Middle School
- Thomas Jefferson Middle School
- Western Middle School for the Arts
- Westport Middle School

=== Elementary ===
- Alex R. Kennedy Elementary School
- Atkinson Academy
- Auburndale Elementary School
- Audubon Traditional Elementary School
- Bates Elementary School
- Bloom Elementary School
- Blue Lick Elementary School
- Bowen Elementary School
- Brandeis Elementary School
- Breckinridge-Franklin Elementary School
- Byck Elementary School
- Camp Taylor Elementary School
- Cane Run Elementary School
- Carter Traditional Elementary School
- Chancey Elementary School
- Chenoweth Elementary School
- Cochran Elementary School
- Cochrane Elementary School
- Coleridge-Taylor Montessori Elementary School
- Coral Ridge Elementary School
- Crums Lane Elementary School
- Dixie Elementary School
- Dunn Elementary School
- Eisenhower Elementary School
- Engelhard Elementary School
- Fairdale Elementary School
- Farmer Elementary School
- Fern Creek Elementary School
- Field Elementary School
- Foster Traditional Academy
- Frayser Elementary School
- Goldsmith Elementary School
- Greathouse/Shryock Traditional
- Greenwood Elementary School
- Gutermuth Elementary School
- Hartstern Elementary School
- Hawthorne Elementary School
- Hazelwood Elementary School
- Hite Elementary School
- Indian Trail Elementary School
- Jacob Elementary School
- Jeffersontown Elementary School
- Johnsontown Road Elementary School
- Kennedy Elementary School
- Kenwood Elementary School
- Kerrick Elementary School
- Klondike Lane Elementary School
- Laukhuf Elementary School
- Layne Elementary School
- Lincoln Elementary Performing Arts
- Lowe Elementary School
- Luhr Elementary School
- Maupin Elementary School
- McFerran Preparatory Academy
- Medora Elementary School
- Middletown Elementary School
- Mill Creek Elementary School
- Minors Lane Elementary School
- Norton Commons Elementary School
- Norton Elementary School
- Okolona Elementary School
- Perry Elementary School
- Portland Elementary School
- Price Elementary School
- Rangeland Elementary School
- Rutherford Elementary School
- Sanders Elementary School
- Schaffner Traditional Elementary School
- Semple Elementary School
- Shacklette Elementary School
- Shelby Academy
- Slaughter Elementary School
- Smyrna Elementary School
- St. Matthews Elementary School
- Stonestreet Elementary School
- Stopher Elementary School
- Trunnell Elementary School
- Tully Elementary School
- Watterson Elementary School
- Wellington Elementary School
- Wheeler Elementary School
- Wilder Elementary School
- Wilkerson Elementary School
- Wilt Elementary School
- Young Elementary School

=== Early childhood ===
- Diane L. Porter Preschool

=== 6–12 schools ===
- The Academy @ Shawnee
- Marion C. Moore School

=== STEAM schools ===
- Grace M. James Academy of Excellence (all-girls, grades 6–12)

=== Magnet schools ===
- J. Graham Brown School (grades K–12)
- W.E.B. Dubois academy

=== Special education schools ===
- Ahrens Educational Resource Center (grade 12)
- Binet School (grades K–12)
- Churchill Park School (grades PK–12)
- Mary Ryan Academy (grades 9–12)
- Waller-Williams Environmental School

=== Alternative education schools ===
- Breckinridge Metropolitan High (grades 7–12)
- Liberty High School (grades 7–12)
- Minor Daniel's Academy (grades 6–12)
- Newcomer Academy (grades K–12)
- The Phoenix School of Discovery (grades 6–12)

== History ==
Public education in the Louisville area dates to 1829 and the beginning of the Louisville Public School District. In 1838 a separate county school system began operating. In 1975 the two systems were merged by court order.

=== Louisville Public School District (1829–1975) ===
On April 24, 1829, the City of Louisville established the first public schools for children under 16. A board of trustees was selected, and Edward Mann Butler was selected as the first head. The first school began operation in the upper story of a Baptist church on the southwest corner of Fifth and Green Streets (now Liberty Street). The next year, the first public school building in the Louisville Public School District was erected at Fifth and Walnut (now Muhammad Ali Boulevard). This property was purchased from one of the trustees for $2,100. Though Louisville's charter provided for the establishment of free schools, the school established at Fifth and Walnut charged primary grades $1 per quarter of instruction and all other grades $1.50. Tuition was waived if the trustees felt a child was unable to pay. Instruction was given using the Lancastrian system of teaching, wherein higher-level students teach the younger while the teacher and assistants supervise and instruct the higher-level students.

After a few years, the state granted half of the property of the Jefferson Seminary for use in constructing a "High School College". By 1838, the city of Louisville had a full-service school system. Tuition was abolished for all Louisville residents in 1851, and 1856, Male High School and Female High School opened their doors. From 1851 until 1871, 17 schools were erected on 20 lots. School enrollment grew from 4,303 at the beginning of that period to 13,503 at the end. In 1870, the first public schools in the city for African Americans were established in the Center Street African Methodist Church and the First Street African Baptist Church. The first school building for African American students was dedicated on October 7, 1873. At the end of the 1896–97 school year, enrollment reached 26,242 (20,559 white, 5,683 black). In 1907–08, the school system's enrollment was 29,211 (23,458 white, 5,753 black). In 1912, the Louisville Public School District began annexing property in Jefferson County that had already been annexed by city government, bringing enrollment to 45,841 (33,831 white, 12,010 black) by the 1956 school year, the last year of segregated education in the public schools. In its final year as a separate school district, enrollment was 40,939 (19,171 white, 21,768 black).

=== Common Schools of Jefferson County/Jefferson County School District (1838–1975) ===
The Common Schools of Jefferson County school district (CSJC) was established by the state legislature in 1838. As of an 1840 report by the Superintendent of Public Education for the state, there were 30 schools in this district. In this report, the "whole population" of Jefferson County was figured at 36,310, with 5,843 of ages 5 to 15 and 3,744 from 7 to 17. 626 was reported as the number of students "at school". In 1850, 561 children were listed as attending six-month schools and 130 were listed as attending three-month schools. In the 1876–77 school year, 58 schools were reported for white children and 10 for black children.

In 1884, a state Board of Education was created and a county superintendent elected by popular vote to replace the appointed commissioner. In 1925, the County Administration Law was passed by state legislature, requiring the appointment of the superintendent by the Board of Education. Enrollment in the Jefferson County Schools in 1956 (last year of segregation) was 36,308 (34,911 white, 1,397 black). In the last year separate from Louisville Schools, enrollment was 89,405 (84,666 white, 4,739 black).

=== Merger and desegregation ===
In 1971, several civil rights organizations filed a lawsuit asking that the Louisville, Jefferson County, and Anchorage school systems be merged. This was because of the large concentration of African Americans in the city school district and extremely low concentration in the other two. The organizations felt this created conditions similar to segregation. In 1974, U.S. District Judge James F. Gordon ordered the merger of the Louisville and Jefferson County school districts, and on February 28, 1975, the state Board of Education made the merger effective on April 1 of that year. A merger and desegregation plan was created, which included mandatory busing and racial guidelines for school assignments. The initial plan was for black students to be bused 10 of their 12 years in school and white students to be bused 2 of 12 years. The court ceased active supervision of this plan in 1978.

The racial guidelines used have seen several revisions since that time. In 1984, a plan was instituted for middle and high schools that involved a system of zones and satellite areas. In 1992, Project Renaissance was implemented in the elementary schools, a program that achieved desegregation by allowing parents some choice in school placement. A mandatory 15–50% African-American population in all schools was established in 1996. Two years later, six parents sued to remove the upper limit from Central High School, a traditionally African-American school. On June 10, 1999, U.S. District Judge John Heyburn II ruled that the 1975 desegregation order was not dissolved in 1978 when court supervision ended. Some elements of that original ruling were still in effect. Additionally, it was ruled that JCPS could use racial classifications to prevent emergence of racially identifiable schools. These proceedings resulted in the banning of racial quotas at Central and the school system being required to redesign its admission procedures by the 2002–03 school year.

The desegregation order was lifted in 2000, but JCPS maintained the 15–50% guideline in most schools. In 2002, Crystal Meredith sued on behalf of her son, who she claimed was denied enrollment in a school because of race. In 2002, school board members Steve Imhoff and Larry Hujo first suggested that the board consider that the plan's criteria be based upon the income of parents and not race (SES). The purpose was to maintain diversity with the thought that the U.S. Supreme Court might strike down the then current plan based upon race alone. There was resistance, but income did become the focal point of the plan adopted in 2008. In October 2005, the 6th U.S. Circuit Court of Appeals ruled against Meredith. In June 2006, the United States Supreme Court agreed to hear the case, the first time it had elected to rule on a school district's use of a voluntary desegregation plan. The case was combined with a similar one from Seattle, Washington, involving that school district's use of a tiebreaker system for school assignment based on race.

In June 2007, the U.S. Supreme Court ruled in favor of the plaintiffs, holding that the school district plans in Louisville and Seattle violated constitutional guarantees of equal protection, and race could not be the only factor considered. The Jefferson County Board of Education then amended the plan in 2008 to consider the income, education, and minority status of parents in two geographic areas of the county, which was later amended to apply to census tracts, based upon the 2010 census.

=== Recent superintendents ===
Donna Hargens was hired as superintendent in 2011. Hargens was previously the chief academic officer for the Wake County Public Schools in North Carolina. Hargens resigned effective July 1, 2017, in an agreement with the Jefferson County Board of Education. She was the second female superintendent for public schools in Louisville. The first was Rosa Anna Phillips Stonestreet, who served from 1898 to 1910, when the structure for governance was changed with no more elections for the post.

Sheldon Berman was hired in 2007. Upon his termination, he accepted a position as superintendent of the Eugene (Oregon) School District. Before Berman, Stephen Daeschner had been superintendent since 1993. When his contract was not renewed by the board of education, he accepted a superintendent position in Naperville, Illinois.

The current superintendent is Brian Yearwood, who was formerly superintendent at Columbia Public Schools in Missouri. Yearwood was named acting superintendent in 2025 when Marty Pollio resigned after eight years of work.

=== COVID-19 ===
When a Louisville man sought to attend a public Jefferson County Board of Education (JCBE) board meeting at a Jefferson County Public Schools (JCPS) building during the COVID-19 pandemic in Kentucky in August 2022, officers asked him to put on a mask, and the man refused. Alternatively, the man was offered a face shield, or a COVID-19 test, or the opportunity to request a waiver, all of which the man also refused; accordingly, he was not granted entry into the building. Kentucky Attorney General Daniel Cameron claimed the district had violated Kentucky's Open Meetings Act. JCBE argues that at the time, masks were required to enter the building, not the meeting itself, as part of the board's July 2022 Health Guidance Plan, which requires that when community spread of COVID-19 is ranked "high" in Jefferson County (which it was at the time), masks must be worn to enter JCPS property. The man had previously filed unsuccessful claims against the Board alleged that among other things it had "violated Nuremberg code by 'participating in human experimentation'" and "sexually exploited minors". In January 2023 the board appealed Cameron's decision in Jefferson County Circuit Court.

=== 2023 busing problems and school cancellations ===
Following significant systematic overhauling to the school transportation system, such as staggered start times, changed bus stop locations and increased bus drivers, severe delays in the JCPS busing arose immediately. On August 9, the first day of school, students initially faced delays in the morning of up to an hour after the final bus transfer was supposed to happen, and some students were reportedly dropped off at the wrong school. Superintendent Marty Pollio initially dismissed these issues as "very similar to any other year we've had", but widespread issues with busing became much more severe when students were dismissed. It took until 9:58 p.m. for JCPS spokesperson Carolyn Callahan to announce that all students had been dropped off.

Due to the severity in these delays, JCPS schools were closed until August 18.

== Initiatives ==
The school district is engaged in a number of initiatives.

=== Every 1 Reads ===
Every 1 Reads is a community-wide literacy program that started in 2003 as a partnership between Greater Louisville, Inc., the Louisville Metro government, and JCPS in an effort to get every student reading at grade level by 2008.

=== GE "College Bound" program ===
In 2005, the GE Foundation announced that it was giving the school district a four-year $25-million grant, the largest non-governmental grant the district received. This was part of the foundation's College Bound program, started in 1989 in an effort to increase the number of students going to college. This program includes a revamped Math and Science curriculum in a holistic K-12 approach involving the superintendent, the board of education, and the teachers' union.

== See also ==
- List of public schools in Louisville, Kentucky.(predominantly schools in JCPS)
