= Litkenhous Ratings =

Mathematical system for ranking sports teams

The Litkenhous Difference by Score Ratings system was a mathematical system used to rank football and basketball teams. The Litrating system was developed by Vanderbilt University professor Edward Earl ("E.E.") Litkenhous Jr. (1907 – December 22, 1984) and his brother, Francis H. Litkenhous (December 9, 1912 – June 22, 1996).

Edward Litkenhous (1907-1984) received an undergraduate degree from the University of Louisville and a doctorate from the University of Minnesota. He began his career as a professor of chemical engineering at the Speed Scientific School of the University of Louisville. He later became a professor at Vanderbilt University and served as head of that school's engineering department. He died in 1984.

The National Collegiate Athletic Association (NCAA) football records book includes the Litkenhous Ratings as a "major selector" of college football national championships for the seasons 1934 through 1984.

== College football national champions ==
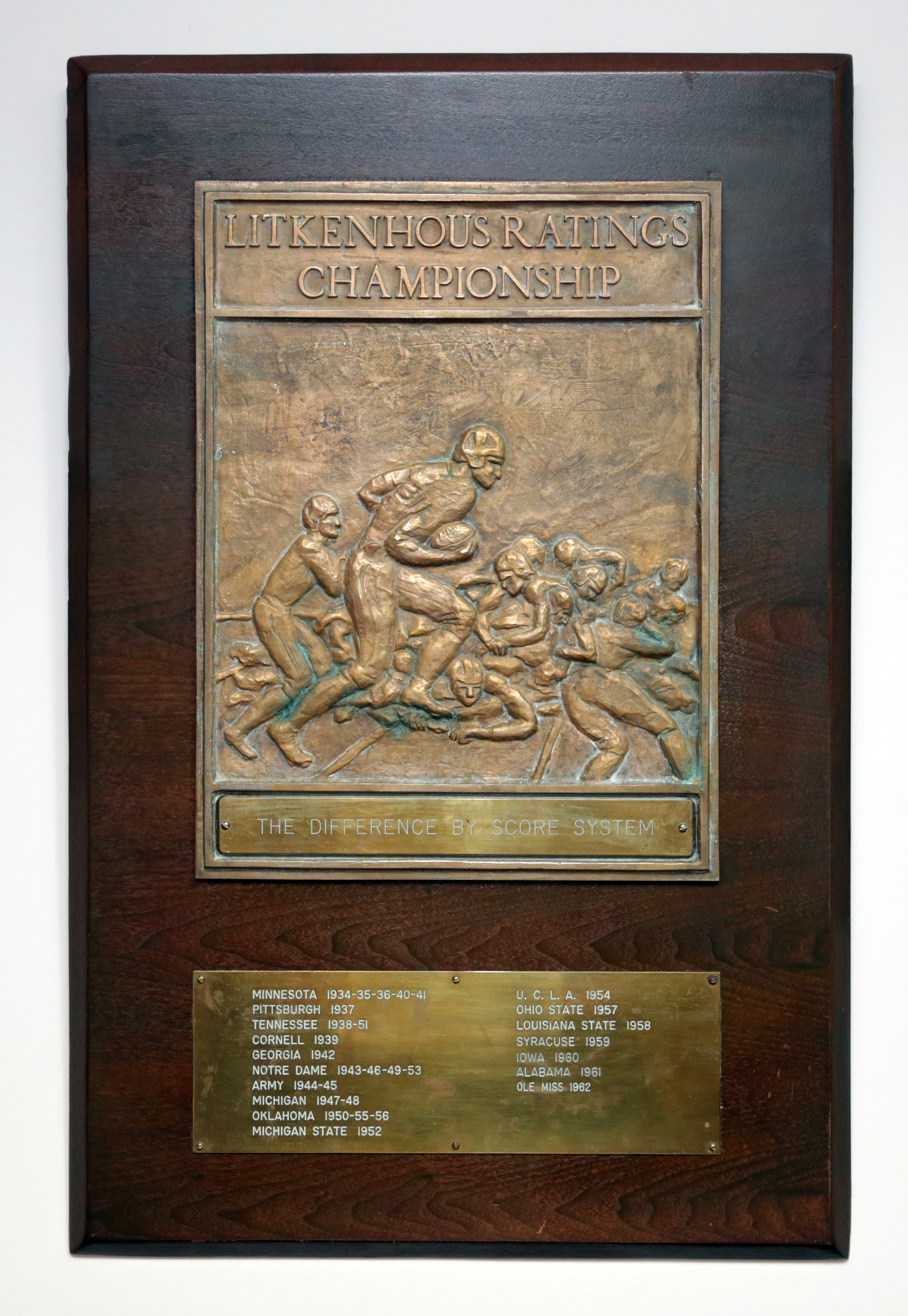
Litkenhous Ratings Championship trophy, 1934–1962

Teams in the following table were ranked No. 1 by the Litkenhous Difference by Score Ratings system.

The NCAA records book credits Litkenhous as a "major selector" for the seasons 1934 through 1984, and credits the system with 51 total rankings. However no selections are listed in the NCAA records book for six seasons: 1973, 1975, 1976, 1977, 1979, and 1980.

Season	Champion	Record	Litrating	Notes
1934	Minnesota	8–0	103.0	
1935	Minnesota	8–0	100.0	
1936	Minnesota	7–1	96.4	
1937	Pittsburgh	9–0–1	100.0	
1938	Tennessee	11–0	100.0	
1939	Cornell	8–0	96.2	
1940	Minnesota	8–0	100.1	
1941	Minnesota	8–0	101.1	
1942	Georgia	11–1	112.2	
1943	Notre Dame	9–1	131.9	
1944	Army	9–0	141.8	
1945	Army	9–0	133.0	
1946	Notre Dame	8–0–1	114.7	
1947	Michigan	10–0	114.0	
1948	Michigan	9–0	114.1	
1949	Notre Dame	10–0	117.7	
1950	Oklahoma	10–1	105.6	
1951	Tennessee	10–1	114.0	
1952	Michigan State	9–0	115.1	
1953	Notre Dame	9–0–1	110.4	
1954	UCLA	9–0	115.3	
1955	Oklahoma	11–0	109.2	
1956	Oklahoma	10–0	116.3	
1957	Ohio State	9–1	106.7	
1958	LSU	11–0	109.9	
1959	Syracuse	11–0	111.0	
1960	Iowa	8–1	112.8	
1961	Alabama	11–0	113.5	
1962	Ole Miss	10–0	107.3	
1963	Texas	11–0	104.7	
1964	Alabama	10–1	104.9	
1965	Michigan State	10–1	114.0	
1966	Notre Dame	9–0–1	113.8	
1967	Tennessee	9–2	103.0	
1968	Georgia	8–1–2	111.4	
1969	Texas	10–0	117.3	
1970	Texas	10–1	124.0	
1971	Nebraska	13–0	120.6	
1972	USC	12–0	119.2	
1973 †	Alabama	11–1	123.0	
1974	Oklahoma	11–0		
1975 †	Ohio State	11–1	114.3	
1976 †	Michigan	10–2	115.2	
1977 †	Texas	11–1		
1978	Alabama	11-1		
1979 †				
1980 †				
1981	Clemson	12-0		
1982	Nebraska †; Penn St	12–1; 11-1		
1983	Nebraska	12–1	145.8	
1984	Nebraska	10-2		

† Years where Litkenhous selection is omitted from the NCAA records book.

=== Litkenhous trophy ===
The No. 1 team in the year's final ranking was awarded the Litkenhous Ratings Championship trophy. The traveling trophy took the form of a huge wooden plaque and bronze mural by artist Marion Junkin.

The trophy plaque is engraved with the winners for 1934–1962. Ole Miss was evidently the last Litkenhous champion to receive the trophy; the trophy is still held today at the University of Mississippi.
