= Western MST Magnet High School (Louisville, Kentucky) =

Coordinates: 38.17656°N 85.84477°W

Western High School

Location
- 2501 Rockford Lane, 40216; Louisville, Kentucky; United States

Information
- Type: Public Secondary
- School district: Jefferson County Public Schools
- Principal: Michael L. Kelly
- Staff: 45.68 (FTE)
- Grades: 9–12
- Enrollment: 684 (2018-19)
- Student to teacher ratio: 14.97
- Campus: Urban
- Color
- Mascot: Warrior
- Website: Western MST Magnet High School

Western High School Early College is a public school in Louisville, Kentucky and is one of 22 high schools in Jefferson County Public Schools. The school offers programs that include: Early College, Culinary Arts, Geographic Information Systems (GIS), Help Desk, A+ certification, and Network+.

== Academics ==
=== Freshman Academy ===
The Freshman Academy allows for an easy transition from middle school to high school. All core content classes are located in the Freshman Academy wing of the campus.

=== Early College ===
Western is one of only two schools in the state of Kentucky that offer Early College Programs. Through this program students can obtain up to 45 college credits by the time they graduate with no tuition fee. These credits apply to programs at Jefferson Community and Technical College (JCTC) or any Kentucky Community and Technical College System (KCTCS) college and transfer to all Kentucky public colleges and universities.

=== Talent Development Academies ===
Western is one of 11 JCPS high schools selected to transition to an academy model in the fall of 2017. JCPS Talent Development Academies are small learning communities organized around career themes that show students links between their academic subjects and real-world career experience. Western is home to a Business academy and a Service academy, which focus on preparing high school students for college and careers by aligning with specific industry clusters for Louisville and the surrounding region: business service, information technology, skilled trades (including culinary and carpentry), and healthcare.

== Athletics ==
- Boys' and Girls' Cross Country
- Football
- Volleyball
- Boys and Girls Basketball
- Wrestling
- Baseball
- Softball
- Boys and Girls Track and Field
- Cheerleading
- Boys Golf

== Notable alumni ==
- Parfait Bitee – Cameroonian basketball player with the University of Rhode Island
- George Bussey – American football offensive guard who is currently a free agent, played college football at Louisville
- Joe Jacoby – former American football offensive lineman for the Washington Redskins
- Breonna Taylor – emergency medical technician whose fatal shooting by police in 2020 led to widespread protests
