= George Bussey =

American football player (born 1984)

No. 68, 75
- Position: Guard

Personal information
- Born: October 24, 1984 (age 42); Louisville, Kentucky, U.S.
- Listed height: 6 ft 3 in (1.91 m)
- Listed weight: 306 lb (139 kg)

Career information
- High school: Louisville (KY) Western
- College: Louisville
- NFL draft: 2009: 5th round, 170th overall pick

Career history
- New England Patriots (2009); Jacksonville Jaguars (2011)*; Tampa Bay Storm (2011–2012); San Jose SaberCats (2013–2015)
- * Offseason or practice squad member only

Awards and highlights
- 2× First-team All-Big East (2006, 2008); Second-team All-Big East (2007); Second Team All-Arena (2012, 2013)

Career AFL statistics
- Receptions: 5
- Receiving yards: 56
- Total tackles: 1
- Stats at ArenaFan.com
- Stats at Pro Football Reference

George Bussey (born October 24, 1984) is an American former professional football offensive guard. He was selected by the New England Patriots in the fifth round of the 2009 NFL draft. He played college football at Louisville.

== Early life ==
Bussey attended Western High School in Louisville, Kentucky, where he played football as an offensive lineman. He was named a county all-star and started at both tackle and guard.

== College career ==
After graduating from high school in 2004, Bussey was a walk-on at the University of Louisville. He was a reserve offensive lineman and played on special teams in his sophomore season in 2005. In 2006, he started all 13 games playing both tackle and guard, and did not yield a sack en route to a first-team All-Big East Conference selection. He started 12 games in his junior season and earned Second-team All-Big East honors. In his 2008 senior season, Bussey was named a first-team All-Big East for the second time, playing both guard and tackle, and was named to Outland Trophy preseason watch lists.

== Professional career ==
=== New England Patriots ===
Bussey was drafted by the Patriots in the fifth round (170th overall) of the 2009 NFL draft. On July 23, he signed a four-year contract. He was placed on injured reserve on September 5 with a knee injury, ending his season. He returned to participate in the Patriots' preseason games in 2010 before being waived/injured on September 4. He cleared waivers the next day and was placed on injured reserve. Bussey received an injury settlement and became a free agent on September 13, 2010.

=== San Jose SaberCats ===
On July 17, 2015, Bussey was placed on reassignment.
