= John W. Shumaker =

President of the University of Tennessee

22nd President of the University of Tennessee system
- In office 2002–2003
- Preceded by: Emerson H. Fly
- Succeeded by: John D. Petersen

16th President of the University of Louisville
- In office 1995–2002
- Preceded by: Donald C. Swain
- Succeeded by: James R. Ramsey

Personal details
- Born: 1942 (age 83–84)
- Education: University of Pittsburgh (BA); University of Pennsylvania (MA, PhD)
- Profession: Academic administrator

John William Shumaker (born 1942) is an American educator who was president of Central Connecticut State University, the University of Louisville, and the University of Tennessee.

== Early life and education ==
Shumaker is a native of Pittsburgh, Pennsylvania, where he was born in 1942. He received a bachelor's degree in ancient Greek from the University of Pittsburgh, where he was admitted into Phi Beta Kappa. He undertook graduate study in classical studies at the University of Pennsylvania, receiving master's and doctoral degrees in 1966 and 1969, respectively. His doctoral dissertation was entitled "Homeric transformations in the Argonautica of Apollonius of Rhodes."

== University career ==
Shumaker began his academic career as a faculty member at Ohio State University. In 1975 he became associate dean of the College of Humanities there. He left Ohio State in 1977 for the State University of New York at Albany, where he was initially the dean of humanities and fine arts and later became vice president for academic planning and development. In 1987 he left SUNY Albany to become president of Central Connecticut State University, where he was until 1995, when he accepted the presidency of the University of Louisville. While he was at Louisville, the university increased its endowment from $183 million to more than $500 million. Shumaker worked to enhance the university's profile as a research university. He was also credited with a successful effort to build a new football stadium at Louisville which was largely funded through alumni donations; hiring Rick Pitino to coach the school's basketball team; and helping to improve the quality of the student body, as indicated by the test scores of the freshmen who enrolled at the university.

In 2002, Shumaker left Louisville to accept the University of Tennessee system presidency. The move to Tennessee increased his annual compensation to a total of $733,550, including bonuses, which reportedly made him second-highest-paid president of a U.S. public university. For comparison, his compensation at Louisville was reported by the Louisville Cardinal as $264,000 but was reported in the Chronicle of Higher Education as having been more than $600,000. When Shumaker was offered the Tennessee job, Louisville had offered to pay him a bonus of $1.5 million if he would stay until 2008, but the initiative was unsuccessful.

== Controversy, resignation, and repercussions ==
Shumaker's tenure at the University of Tennessee ended in August 2003 when he resigned in the midst of controversy over allegations that he had misused university resources. The first allegations were made in June of that year when Knoxville, Tennessee, news media reported that the university had paid for his personal travel on a university-owned airplane. Shumaker eventually reimbursed the university more than $30,000 (more than $5,000 in July 2003, followed by more than $25,000 the following month) for his personal airplane use. In July 2003, additional questions arose regarding personal expenses that Shumaker had charged to a university credit card, a $300,000 consulting contract that the university had established with a Washington, D.C. attorney who was a long-time friend and business partner of Shumaker's without going through a bidding process, and a revelation that Shumaker had failed to tell the university that he was a trustee of a college in Greece. In August, it was publicly revealed that in 1995 and 1996, shortly after being president of Central Connecticut State University, Shumaker had received $10,000 in personal payments from Hyundai, apparently related to a $110,000 contract he had signed with Hyundai to train students at the Connecticut school. He submitted his resignation on August 8, 2003, following public requests for his resignation from at least one state senator and a member of the university's board of trustees, as well as a public statement by Tennessee Governor Phil Bredesen that the controversy was hurting the university.

After Shumaker's departure from the University of Tennessee, all three of the universities where he had been president undertook audits of his spending during his presidencies. The University of Tennessee found that Shumaker had incurred $165,000 in expenses for football-related entertainment and $73,000 in expenses for holiday receptions. He also ordered $493,000 in renovations and new furnishings for his official residence, which had been remodeled at a cost of $787,597 less than a year earlier. His unauthorized purchases for the home included $97,350 for a new sun room and closet, $77,270 to create two bedrooms for his sons, a new telecommunications system that cost $64,000, a $7,000 Persian rug, two $7,400 entertainment systems, and a $4,822 gas grill. Officials in Connecticut deemed the Hyundai payments to be a violation of the state's ethics laws, but could not prosecute because of the statute of limitations.

In a 2004 interview, Shumaker said that the allegations against him were unfair or "not true." He characterized himself as having been the victim of metaphorical "piranhas." He said that the $300,000 no-bid contract had been reviewed by university attorneys and the recipient was not actually his business partner, and he defended his renovations to the University of Tennessee president's house as a necessary expense in connection with entertaining university donors.

Shumaker claimed severance pay under his employment contract with the University of Tennessee. Initially he asked for about $420,000 and at one time claimed that he was owed as much as $1.7 million, but eventually received $175,000 after reaching a settlement with the university in January 2009.

Since his departure from the University of Tennessee, Shumaker's professional activities have included assisting nonprofit organizations as a fund-raising consultant and working on rebuilding the higher education system of Afghanistan. In the fall of 2009, it was reported that he was living and working in Pakistan. In July 2013 he began a new assignment with the International Rescue Committee, a New-York based non-profit organization, as chief of party for its five-year $160 million Pakistan Reading Project, which is funded by USAID.

== Shumaker Building at University of Louisville ==
In October 2009, the University of Louisville announced that it would rename a campus building in Shumaker's honor, commemorating his contribution to increasing the university's focus on research. The John W. Shumaker Building, completed in 2006 and renamed for Shumaker in November 2009, houses offices and labs of the university's College of Arts and Sciences and J.B. Speed School of Engineering.

== Family ==
John Shumaker's first marriage, to Michele Deasy Shumaker, ended with her death from cancer in 1994. The couple had two sons.

In January 1996, after his move to the University of Louisville, Shumaker married Kentuckian Lucy Craig Steilberg. The couple separated in 2002 when John Shumaker moved to Knoxville, Tennessee, to assume the Tennessee presidency without his wife Lucy. The couple's divorce trial in 2003 became a source of some of the revelations that led to his departure from the University of Tennessee. The divorce became final in August 2003.
