= Jefferson Seminary =

The Jefferson Seminary was one of Kentucky's first schools and is considered to be the direct ancestor of the University of Louisville.

The school was chartered by the Kentucky General Assembly in 1798, with the sale of 6,000 acres (24 km^{2}) of land in rural southern Kentucky used to pay for initial construction. Eight prominent citizens of the fledgling village of Louisville (then the second-largest city on the Falls of the Ohio River) met together on April 3, 1798, to seek donations for the school and to arrange for its board of trustees and faculty. "No religious connotation was implied by the term seminary."

The process of establishing the school was slow, with a school house finally being built at the present day intersection of 8th Street and Muhammad Ali Boulevard sometime between 1813 and 1816. Its first principal was Edward Mann Butler, one of Kentucky's most prominent educators and a man who later became the state's most trusted historian. The school offered both high school and college level courses in English, geography, French, Latin, geometry, and trigonometry. It had an average of 45 to 50 students, who paid $20 for a six-month term.

Despite the school's early success, pressure from newly established public schools would force its closure in 1829. Criticism from what became The Courier-Journal also aided the closing, with its editor, Shadrach Penn Jr., who editorialized that the school "was elitist and didn't give Louisville's school children a practical education."
