= Metro-College =

Metropolitan College or Metro-College for short is a collaboration of Jefferson Community and Technical College, University of Louisville, state government, local government, and UPS in an effort to help students attend college.

== About ==
The program was founded in 1998 and offers students working for UPS free tuition at the colleges in the program. Students are eligible if they work the shifts between 10 p.m. and 4 a.m. and they will get a book allowance and housing subsidy.

Other benefits include services such as: tutoring, career counseling center, personal counseling services, Student Activates Center at U of L, U of L gymnasium, ACCESS Center (for Adult Services), Deaf Student Service Offices, and a disability resource center.

== Terms and conditions ==
In order to stay in the MC program students must obtain at least a C in each class taken. Also every semester that students wish to participate in the program a new contract must be signed. It is not like the FAFSA which only requires being done once a year. The student can major in any subject that either of the two schools offer and that they are "academically qualified" for. It is not required for a student to be full-time, however in order to receive the academic bonuses, they must be enrolled in a minimum of 6 credit hours a semester. If a student plans on attending graduate school the MC program will only pay the undergraduate instate rate, the rest is left to the student to pay for. Transferring to any of the three participating schools is allowed, but it is recommended to first see a Metro-College representative. MC does not provide transportation to and from the UPS facilities but with the students school ID or sticker obtained through the MC program, the TARC is available.
