= Donald C. Swain =

Donald C. Swain (1931–2023) was an American historian, academic administrator, and president of the University of Louisville in Kentucky. He was born on October 14, 1931, in Des Moines, Iowa. Swain served as a cryptologist in the United States Navy during the Korean War and later pursued a career in academia. He earned a PhD in 20th-Century American Conservation History from the University of California, Berkeley, and became a professor in the History Department at the University of California, Davis. He served as the Vice Chancellor of Student Affairs.

In 1981, Swain became President of the University of Louisville; he retired in 1995. According to the current President Kim Schatzel, "Under his watch, U of L began the transformation from an urban commuter school to the Research 1 powerhouse it is today." He led the university from 1981 to 1995, presiding over modernization of programs, an expanded faculty and student body, a growing endowment, new construction on the Belknap Campus, and the creation of the Grawemeyer Awards program.

== Bibliography ==
Swain's major publications are:

- Swain, Donald C. "The Rise of a Research Empire: NIH, 1930 to 1950: The spectacular growth of NIH came after two decades of careful planning by the Public Health Service." Science 138.3546 (1962): 1233–1237. online
- Swain, Donald C. National Conservation Policy: Federal Conservation Policy, 1921-1933 (U of California Press, 1963) online
- Swain, Donald C. "Harold Ickes, Horace Albright, and the Hundred Days: A Study in Conservation Administration." Pacific Historical Review 34.4 (1965): 455–465. online
- Swain, Donald C. "The Passage of the National Park Service Act of 1916." Wisconsin Magazine of History (1966): 4–17. online
- Swain, Donald C. Wilderness defender; Horace M. Albright and conservation (U of Chicago Press, 1970) online
- Swain, Donald C. "The Bureau of Reclamation and the New Deal, 1933-1940." Pacific Northwest Quarterly 61.3 (1970): 137–146. online
- Swain, Donald C. "The National Park Service and the New Deal, 1933-1940." Pacific Historical Review 41.3 (1972): 312–332. online
