= Gerry Bradley =

American academic administrator

20th President of the University of Louisville
- Incumbent
- Assumed office March 26, 2025
- Preceded by: Kim Schatzel

Executive Vice President of the University of Louisville
- In office February 7, 2024 – March 26, 2025

Provost of the University of Louisville
- In office July 1, 2023 – March 26, 2025

Personal details
- Education: University of Bern (DMD); Ohio State University; University College Cork

T. Gerard Bradley is an American academic administrator who is currently serving as the 20th president of the University of Louisville since March 26, 2025. He joined the University of Louisville as dean of the School of Dentistry in August 2016. Prior to his appointment as president, Bradley served as provost for the University of Louisville from 2022 to 2025.

Prior to his service at the University of Louisville, Bradley served as a professor and chair of developmental sciences at the Marquette University School of Dentistry, where he also held the role of associate dean for research and graduate studies. He is a member of the boards of the American Dental Association, the American Board of Orthodontics, the American Dental Education Association, and the International Association for Dental Research.

He received a Bachelor of Dental Surgery in Cork, Ireland, a Master of Science degree from The Ohio State University, and a doctorate in dentistry from the University of Bern, Switzerland.
