= Marcia Shallcross Hite =

American watercolor artist

- Born: 1881
- Died: July 13, 1946 (aged 58–59)
- Known for: Watercolor
- Spouse: Allen Rose Hite

Marcia Shallcross Hite (1877 – July 13, 1946) was an American watercolor artist.

Marcia S. Hite began painting around age 40 after participating in psychological experiments which revealed her strong memory for images. She was largely self-taught, with Fayette Barnum as a mentor.

Her watercolor "The Jockey" was awarded first prize at the fourth annual exhibition of the Louisville Art Association. Her composition "The Ohio River Towboat" won first prize in the 1930 exhibition of the Southern States Art League.

She had one-man shows in Dudensing Galleries (1930, New York City), Frank K. M. Rehn Galleries (1940, New York City), Memorial Art Gallery (Rochester, NY), the Milwaukee Art Institute, and Grace Horne Gallery (Boston).

The Hite Art Institute in Louisville, Kentucky is named for her and her husband, Allen Rose Hite. Allen Hite, who died in 1941 left the bulk of his estate to his wife with the provision that when she died that the money would then go to the University of Louisville.

Marcia Hite was active in the arts scene in Louisville, Kentucky. She helped found the Louisville Art Center and acted as director of the Louisville Art Association.
