= James R. Ramsey =

American academic administrator

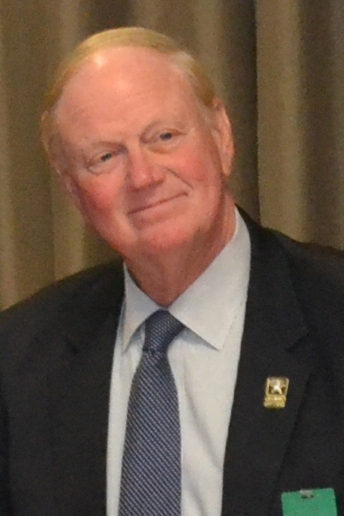
- Ramsey in 2015

17th President of the University of Louisville
- In office November 4, 2002 – June 17, 2016
- Preceded by: John W. Shumaker
- Succeeded by: Neeli Bendapudi

Personal details
- Born: November 14, 1948 (age 77)
- Education: Western Kentucky University (BBA); University of Kentucky (MA, PhD)
- Profession: Academic administrator

James R. Ramsey (born November 14, 1948) is the former president of the University of Louisville, located in Louisville, Kentucky, and the former president of the closely related University of Louisville Foundation. He was president from 2002 until 2016 and helped turn Louisville from a commuter school to a more campus-oriented university with a strong focus on research. In 2016, he was asked to step down after a number of scandals, but remained president of the foundation.

== Career ==
Ramsey earned a Bachelor of Science degree in Business Administration from Western Kentucky University in 1970, and a Master of Arts and Ph.D. in Economics from the University of Kentucky in 1972 and 1974, respectively.

Ramsey twice was Kentucky's budget director under Democratic governor Paul Patton from 1995 to 1998 and again from 1999 to 2002 and worked as the state government's chief economist. He has also directed Kentucky's Office of Financial Management, been the state's chief Economic Analyst, and worked in the Office of Investment and Debt Management. He also worked as interim commissioner of Kentucky's Office of the New Economy.

Ramsey was an economics professor at five other universities: the University of North Carolina at Chapel Hill, Loyola University, the University of Kentucky, Western Kentucky University, and Middle Tennessee State University.

== President of the University of Louisville ==
Ramsey was appointed president at Louisville in 2002, and assisted in remaking the university, turning it from a commuter school to a more campus-oriented school, and focusing more on research: "Under Ramsey, U of L has filed for more patents, seen its endowment grow and joined the Atlantic Coast Conference. It also moved to invest in and develop real estate as a way to offset stagnant state funding", according to Kate Howard from Louisville Public Media.

The last several years of Ramsey's tenure as president of the university were marked with scandals, including an escort sex scandal involving basketball playing recruits between 2010 and 2014 that led to a postseason playing ban for the 2015–16 season, the "costume controversy", and his holding dual roles as both president of the university and president of the university's foundation.

=== Costume controversy ===
In October 2015, Ramsey and his wife hosted a Halloween luncheon at the university presidents' mansion, at which he and his staff dressed as stereotypical Mexicans, wearing sombreros and large fake mustaches. Ramsey and his chief of staff later apologized after this was criticized as being culturally insensitive.

=== Dual role as president of the University of Louisville Foundation ===
Ramsey received criticism for holding the position of president of the University of Louisville while also being the president of the University of Louisville Foundation, a $1.1 billion fund-raising entity associated with the university endowment. He received $2.8 million in compensation from the Foundation in 2014. The relationship between the university and the foundation was investigated by the Kentucky state auditor Mike Harmon. He stepped down as president of the university in June 2016 and retained the foundation job.

=== Foundation mismanagement controversy ===
In 2018, Ramsey was accused of mismanaging over $55 million in University of Louisville Foundation funds and was sued by the university. The suit stated that Ramsey, his chief of staff Kathleen Smith, and others, knowingly caused the foundation to spend endowment funds that should have been invested and diverted it to speculative ventures (such as loans that had little realistic chance of repayment), gifts, and excessive compensation for themselves. The university's outside counsel in the suit, Andrew Campbell, managing partner of the Birmingham, Alabama firm, Campbell Guin, said the evidence "clearly establishes a pattern of mismanagement in appropriated expenditures and unauthorized acts...mainly through the direction and planning of Ramsey and Smith."

In July 2021, the university who had previously sought $80 million in damages from Ramsey, settled for $800,000.
