= J. B. Speed School of Engineering =

Public engineering school located on the campus of the University of Louisville

Coordinates: 38.213083°N 85.760835°W

University of Louisville J.B. Speed Schoolof Engineering
- Other name: Speed School
- Type: Public engineering school
- Established: 1925
- Parent institution: University of Louisville
- Dean: Vacant
- Students: 2,775 (Fall 2023)
- Undergraduates: 1,992(Fall 2023)
- Postgraduates: 783(Fall 2023)
- Location: Louisville, Ky
- Website: engineering.louisville.edu

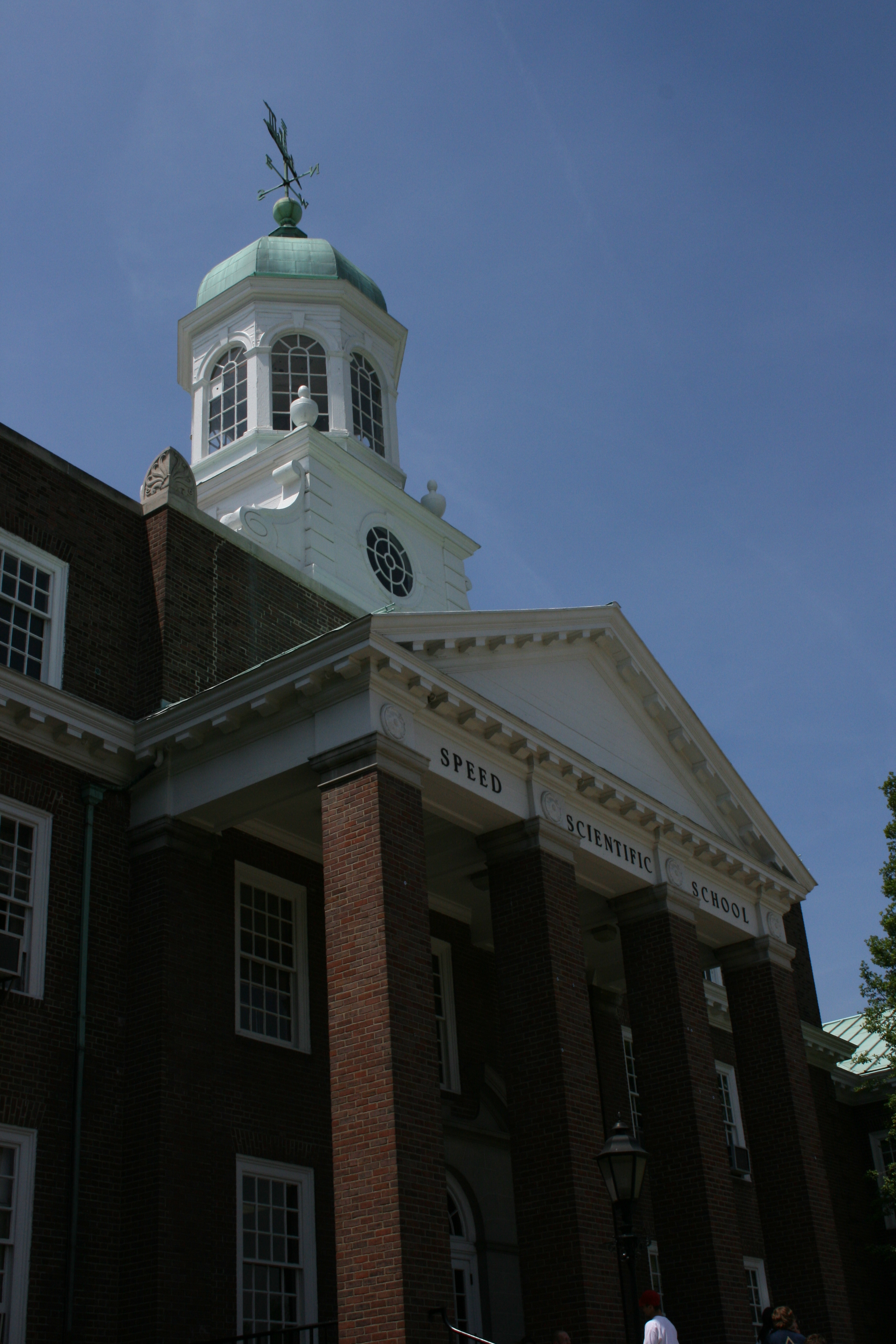
The J. B. Speed building at the Speed School of Engineering

The J. B. Speed School of Engineering (Speed School or Speed) is the engineering college of the University of Louisville, a public research university in Louisville, KY.

== History ==
The college was founded in 1925 by the children of James Breckenridge (J.B.) Speed using a grant from the James Breckenridge Speed Foundation. William S. Speed and Olive Speed Sackett used the grant to established an endowment to honor J. B. Speed. The school began with four departments in Chemical Engineering, Civil Engineering, Electrical Engineering, and Mechanical Engineering.

In 1936, Speed School Bachelor of Science programs became a part of the inaugural accreditation class of the Engineers' Council for Professional Development (ECPD).

Over time, the college created additional engineering departments to meet industry standards. In the early 1970s, the Department Computer Science and Engineering was created. The Department of Industrial Engineering was started in 1977. The Bioengineering Department was established in 2004. Most recently in 2007, the Department of Engineering Fundamentals was established.

Until 2003, it was known as the J. B. Speed Scientific School. The school is colloquially referred to as Speed School or just Speed by students and locals.

In Fall 2025, the new $90-million Student Success & Research Building opened. The building is a four-story, 114,000 sq ft facility with classrooms, labs, conference rooms, and a makerspace. The building was partially funded by a $65 million state grant.

== Degree programs ==
The school offers Bachelor of Science, Master of Engineering, Master of Science and Doctor of Philosophy degrees in seven fields:

- Chemical Engineering (ChE)
- Civil and Environmental Engineering (CEE)
- Computer Science and Engineering (CSE)
- Electrical and Computer Engineering (ECE)
- Engineering Management (EM)
- Industrial Engineering (IE)
- Mechanical Engineering (ME)
- Biomedical Engineering (BE)

The school offers Bachelor of Arts degrees in one field:

- Computer Science (CS)

== Student life ==
In Fall 2018, the student body consists of 2,546 students (2,038 undergraduate and 508 graduate). The largest departments are ME and CECS, with a little more than 485 and 380 students respectively. In student and faculty opinion, the Speed School is considered to be one of the most rigorous and prestigious programs at the university.

When undergraduate students enter the school, they enter into a 5-year combined Bachelors and Masters program. Most students go to school year-round, in Fall, Spring, and Summer semesters, for a total of 14 semesters. Three of the 14 semesters are for co-op internships, to be done at industry locations, three of the 14 semesters are for the graduate (Masters) program, and the other eight semesters are for the undergraduate (Bachelors) program.

== Accreditation ==
Seven programs in the J. B. Speed School of Engineering at the University of Louisville are accredited by the Engineering Accreditation Commission (EAC) of ABET. These programs result in the award of Master of Engineering degrees in the following disciplines:

- Chemical Engineering (ChE)
- Civil and Environmental Engineering (CEE)
- Computer Engineering and Computer Science (CECS)
- Electrical and Computer Engineering (ECE)
- Industrial Engineering (IE)
- Biomedical Engineering (BE)
- Mechanical Engineering (ME)

In addition, the J. B. Speed School of Engineering also offers a B. S. degree in Computer Science that is accredited by the Computer Accreditation Commission (CAC) of ABET.

As of November 2010, all bachelor's degree-level engineering majors are also accredited by ABET.

== Facilities ==
The campus lies almost entirely south of Eastern Parkway on the Belknap Campus (main campus) of the University of Louisville and consists of the following buildings:

- Henry Vogt building — attached to Sackett Hall, used by several departments
- Sackett Hall — attached to the Henry Vogt building, used by the Mechanical Engineering department
- J. B. Speed building — houses the Dean's office, Academic Affairs, Admissions, Departments of Engineering Fundamentals, advising offices, and Industrial Engineering departments
- W. S. Speed building — used by Electrical and Computer Engineering, and Civil and Environmental Engineering departments
- R. C. Ernst Hall — used by the Chemical Engineering department
- Lutz Hall — used by Electrical and Computer Engineering, Biomedical Engineering, Chemical Engineering, and Computer Science and Engineering Departments
- John W. Shumaker Research Building — contains a 10,000 sq ft (930 m^{2}) cleanroom core facility, and nanotechnology and bioengineering research laboratories
- Duthie Center for Engineering — used by the Computer Science and Engineering (CSE) department, along with the Center for Cooperative Education, and a number of classroom facilities used by the Engineering Fundamentals Department.
- Student Success & Research Building — 114,000 sq ft facility with classrooms, lab facilities, conference rooms, and a makerspace
