= University of Louisville =

Public university in Louisville, Kentucky, US

Coordinates: 38°12′54″N 85°45′37″W

- Former names: Jefferson Seminary (1798–1829); Louisville Medical Institute (1837–1846); Louisville College (1840–1846)
- Type: Public research university
- Established: April 3, 1798; 228 years ago
- Accreditation: SACS
- Academic affiliations: CUMU; ORAU; USU; Space-grant
- Endowment: $1.07 billion (FY 2025)
- Budget: $1.79 billion (FY 2026)
- President: Gerry Bradley
- Provost: Kathryn (Katie) Cardarelli
- Faculty: 1,787 full-time, 867 part-time
- Administrative staff: 4,321
- Students: 25,005 (fall 2025)
- Undergraduates: 18,053 (fall 2025)
- Postgraduates: 6,952 (fall 2025)
- Location: Louisville, Kentucky, United States
- Campus: Belknap: 345 acres HSC: 62 acres Shelby: 233 acres Total: 640 acres (2.6 km^{2}); Large city
- Other campuses: Fort Knox; Madisonville; Panama City
- Newspaper: The Louisville Cardinal
- Colors: Cardinal red Black
- Nickname: Cardinals
- Sporting affiliations: NCAA Division I FBS – ACC
- Mascot: Louie the Cardinal
- Website: louisville.edu
- Location of UofL's main campus, Belknap Campus

The University of Louisville (UofL) is a public research university in Louisville, Kentucky, United States. It is part of the Kentucky state university system. Chartered in 1798 as the Jefferson Seminary, it became in the 19th century one of the first city-funded public colleges in the United States. The university is mandated by the Kentucky General Assembly to be a "Preeminent Metropolitan Research University".

Louisville is classified among "R1: Doctoral Universities – Very high research activity". The University of Louisville School of Medicine is touted for the first fully self-contained artificial heart transplant surgery, as well as the first successful hand transplantation in the United States. The University Hospital is also credited with the first civilian ambulance, the nation's first accident services, now known as an emergency department (ED), and one of the first blood banks in the US.

University of Louisville is known for its Cardinals athletics programs. Since 2005, the Cardinals have made appearances in the NCAA Division I men's basketball Final Four in 2005, 2012, and 2013 (vacated); football Bowl Championship Series Orange Bowl in 2007 and Sugar Bowl in 2013; the College Baseball World Series 2007, 2013, 2014, 2017, 2019, and 2025; the women's basketball Final Four in 2009 (runner-up), 2013 (runner-up), 2018 (national semi-final), and 2022 (national semi-final); and the men's soccer national championship game in 2010. The Louisville Cardinals Women's Volleyball program has three-peated as champions of the Big East Tournament (2008, 2009, 2010), were Atlantic Coast Conference Champions in 2015, 2017, 2020, 2021, and 2022, and made appearances in the NCAA Division I women's volleyball Final Four in 2021 and the national championship in 2022 and 2024. Women's track and field program has won Outdoor Big East titles in 2008, 2009 and 2010 and an Indoor Big East title in 2011.

== History ==
=== Founding and early years: 1798–1845 ===
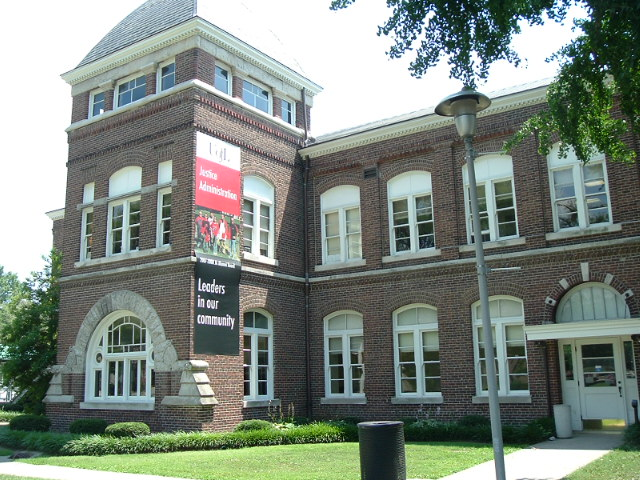
Criminal Justice Building

The University of Louisville traces its roots to a charter granted in 1798 by the Kentucky General Assembly to establish a school of higher learning in the newly founded town of Louisville. It ordered the sale of 6,000 acres (24 km^{2}) of South Central Kentucky land to underwrite construction, joined on April 3, 1798, by eight community leaders who began local fundraising for what was then known as the Jefferson Seminary. It opened 15 years later and offered college and high school level courses in a variety of subjects. It was headed by Edward Mann Butler from 1813 to 1816, who later ran the first public school in Kentucky in 1829 and is considered Kentucky's first historian.

Despite the Jefferson Seminary's early success, pressure from newly established public schools and media critiques of it as "elitist" would force its closure in 1829.

Eight years later, in 1837, the Louisville city council established the Louisville Medical Institute at the urging of renowned physician and medical author Charles Caldwell. As he had earlier at Lexington's Transylvania University, Caldwell rapidly led LMI into becoming one of the leading medical schools in what was then considered the western US. In 1840, Louisville College, a sibling municipal liberal arts school chartered a few years earlier as the Louisville Collegiate Institute, was established. As LMI fared better financially than the college, political efforts ensued to either have LMI pool their resources with the college or have the college take administrative control of LMI, with no success. In 1844 the college inherited land from Jefferson Seminary intended for higher education use, but this did not enhance its financial position.

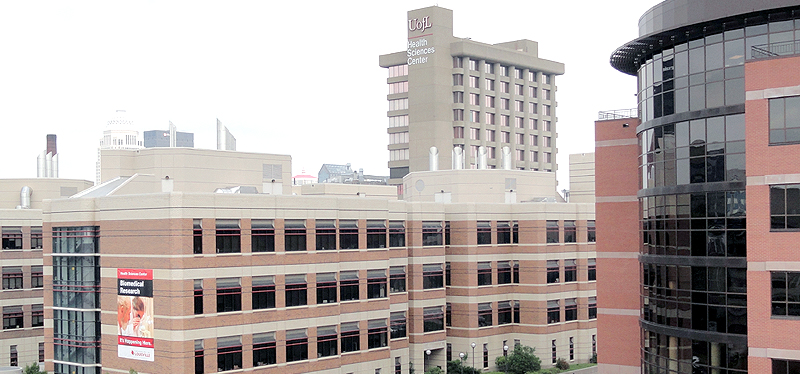
The University of Louisville School of Medicine opened in 1837.

=== As a public municipal university: 1846–1969 ===
In 1846, the Kentucky legislature combined the Louisville Medical Institute, Louisville College, and a newly created law school into the University of Louisville, on a campus just west of Downtown Louisville. As they still maintained separate finances, Louisville College folded soon afterwards. The university experienced rapid growth in the first half of the 20th century, adding new schools in the liberal arts (Note: UofL's College of Arts & Sciences is the liberal arts school.) (1907), graduate studies (1915), dentistry (1918), engineering (Note: Started as Speed Scientific School.) (1925), music (1932), and social work (1936).

In 1923, the school purchased what is today the Belknap Campus, where it moved its liberal arts programs and law school, with the medical school remaining downtown. The school had attempted to purchase a campus donated by the Belknap family in the Highlands area in 1917 (where Bellarmine University is currently located), but a citywide tax increase to pay for it was voted down. The Belknap Campus was named after the family for their efforts. In 1926, the building that would later be dedicated as Grawemeyer Hall was built.

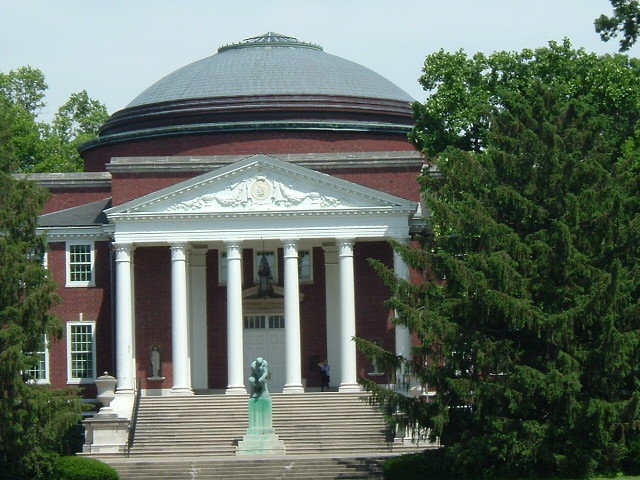
Grawemeyer Hall was built in 1926

In 1931, the university established the Louisville Municipal College for Negroes on the former campus of Simmons University (now Simmons College of Kentucky), as a compromise plan to desegregation. As a part of the university, the school had an equal standing with the school's other colleges. It was dissolved in 1951 when the university desegregated.

During World War II, Louisville was one of 131 colleges and universities nationally that took part in the V-12 Navy College Training Program which offered students a path to a Navy commission.

In the 1950s and 1960s, the university's remaining years independent of the state system, schools were opened for business (1953), education (1968), and justice administration (Note: As of 2025 the Department of Criminal Justice is a part of the College of Arts & Sciences.) (1969).

=== As a public state university: 1970–present ===
Talk of Louisville joining the public university system of Kentucky began in the 1960s. As a city-funded school, the movement of people to the suburbs of Louisville created budget shortfalls for the school and forced tuition prices to levels unaffordable for most students. At the same time, the school's well-established medicine and law schools were seen as potential assets for the state system. Still, there was opposition to the university becoming a state institution, both from faculty and alumni who feared losing the small, close-knit feel of the campus, and from universities already in the state system who feared funding cuts that would be necessitated to accommodate UofL. After several years of heated debate, the university joined the state system in 1970, a move largely orchestrated by then Kentucky governor and UofL alumnus Louie Nunn.

The first years in the state system were difficult, as enrollment skyrocketed while funding was often insufficient. Several programs were threatened with losing accreditation due to a lack of funding, although schools of nursing (1979) and urban and public affairs (Note: As of 2025 the Department of Urban and Public Affairs is a part of the College of Arts & Sciences.) (1983) were added.

John W. Shumaker was named the university's president in 1995. Shumaker was a very successful fundraiser, and quickly increased the school's endowment from $183 to $550 million. He developed the REACH program to encourage retention. In 1997, he hired athletics director Tom Jurich, who restored the athletics program and raised over $100 million to raze abandoned factories and old parking lots next to campus and replace them with on-campus athletic facilities, which vastly improved the aesthetics of the Belknap Campus. Academically, Louisville moved closer to parity with the state's flagship University of Kentucky as retention rates and research funding increased, and average GPAs and ACT scores were much higher for incoming freshmen.

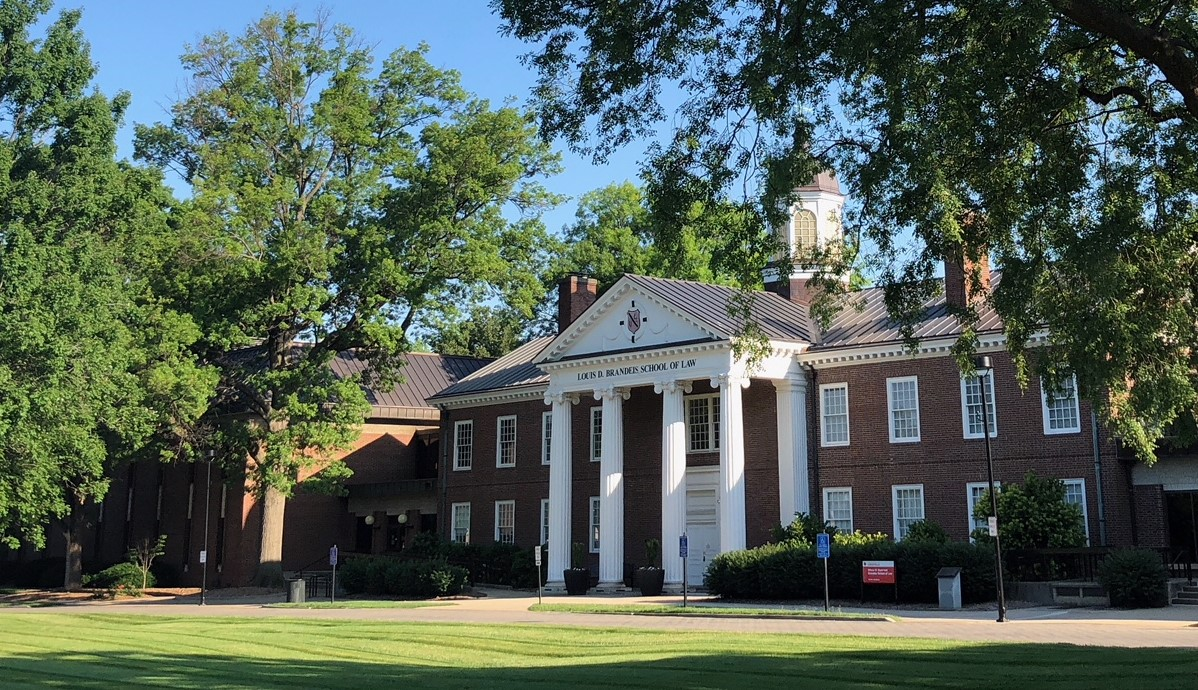
The Louis D. Brandeis School of Law opened in 1846 and was named for Louis D. Brandeis in 1997

James R. Ramsey, the university's 17th president, continued the endowment and fundraising growth started by Shumaker. However, Ramsey added more emphasis on improving the physical aspects of the Belknap Campus. To this end, he started a million-dollar "campus beautification project" which painted six overpasses on the Belknap Campus with a University of Louisville theme and planted over 500 trees along campus streets, and doubled the number of on-campus housing units. The university's federal research funding doubled under Ramsey, and three buildings were built for nanotechnology and medical research. The university's graduation rate increased from 30 percent in 1999 to 52 percent in 2012.

On June 17, 2016, Kentucky Governor Matt Bevin announced that the entire board of trustees of the university would be immediately disbanded and replaced, and that Ramsey would be stepping down. This was confirmed in a statement issued by Ramsey on the same day. Ramsey offered his resignation at a board of trustees meeting on July 27, 2016, which was accepted by the board. In December 2016, the university was placed on academic probation by its accrediting agency, the Southern Association of Colleges and Schools, over concerns that Governor Bevin's actions had "violated rules that require that universities be independent". The probation was lifted a year later. The governor's actions were initially blocked by a judge but supported by new legislation passed by the Kentucky legislature in early 2017. In a lawsuit, the university sought $80 million in damages from president Ramsey, but settled only for $800,000 in 2021.

From 1895 to 2016, the university's Belknap Campus featured a Confederate monument, built before the campus grew to surround the land on which it stood. Commemorating the sacrifices of Confederate veterans who died in the American Civil War, it was erected by the Muldoon Monument Company in 1895 with funds raised by the Kentucky Woman's Confederate Monument Association. Due to controversy in 2016, the statue was moved from its original location to Brandenburg, Kentucky. Relocation started in November and was completed in mid-December.

In the summer of 2017, the university again came into the national spotlight as a series of scandals became public. The university's foundation, the organization that manages its endowment and investments, reported "millions of dollars in unbudgeted spending, unapproved activities and endowment losses" in an audit. The National Collegiate Athletic Association (NCAA) suspended the head coach of the men's basketball team, Rick Pitino, for five games after an investigation revealed that a university employee paid escorts to strip and have sex with players and recruits. Shortly after the NCAA announced its findings and penalties, the Federal Bureau of Investigation and the office of the United States Attorney for the Southern District of New York announced the arrest of 10 individuals connected with a "pay for play" scheme connected to sportswear manufacturer Adidas and many institutions, including Louisville. Pitino was subsequently fired.

Following Neeli Bendapudi's resignation, provost Lori Stewart Gonzalez served as interim president from January 2022 to January 2023. Kim Schatzel became the University of Louisville's 19th president on February 1, 2023. On March 26, 2025, Schatzel resigned as president and Gerry Bradley was appointed the university's 20th president.

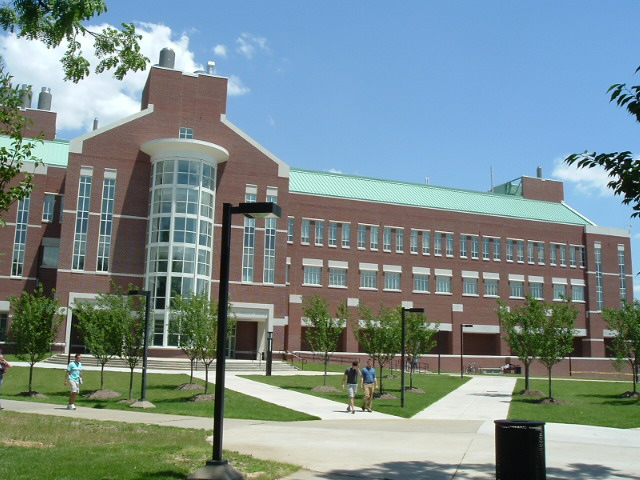
The Shumaker Research Building, completed in 2005

== Campuses ==
The university has three campuses in the Louisville area, the Belknap, the Health Science, and the Shelby. It also has an International Campus in Panama City, Panama, as well as various satellite facilities in the state of Kentucky and abroad:

=== Belknap Campus ===
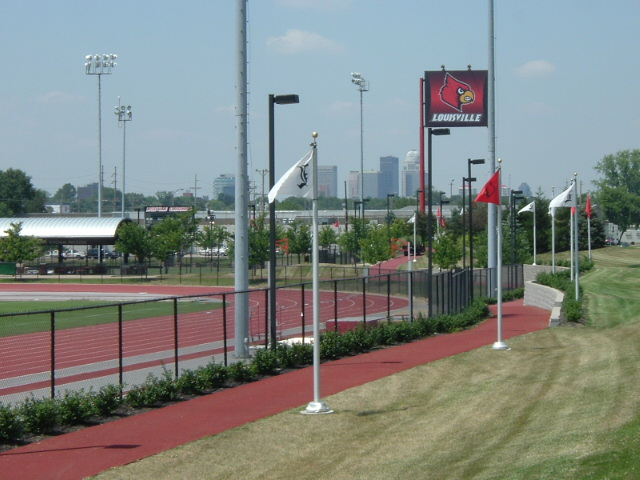
Completed in 2001, Cardinal Park is home to five Cardinal athletic teams.

Acquired in 1923, the Belknap Campus is the school's main campus. It is located three miles (5 km) south of downtown Louisville in the Old Louisville neighborhood. It houses seven of the 12 academic colleges and features one of the casts of Auguste Rodin's The Thinker in front of the main administrative building, Grawemeyer Hall. The grounds of the campus were originally used as an orphanage, with several of the original buildings used.

The Belknap Campus has expanded greatly in recent years, with land housing abandoned factories in the area being purchased and redeveloped. Projects built since 1998 include L&N Federal Credit Union Stadium and adjacent Trager Center fieldhouse, Owsley B. Frazier Cardinal Park (which includes Ulmer Stadium for softball, Trager Stadium for field hockey, Cardinal Track and Soccer Stadium, Bass-Rudd Tennis Center, locker rooms, a playground and a cushioned walking path), Jim Patterson Stadium for baseball, Ralph R. Wright Natatorium, Owsley Brown Frazier Sports Medicine Center, and a lacrosse stadium. With new parking at Cardinal Stadium, non-resident parking was moved there and the parking lots near campus were redeveloped with new dormitory buildings, including the Bettie Johnson Apartments, Kurz Hall, Minardi Hall, and Community Park.

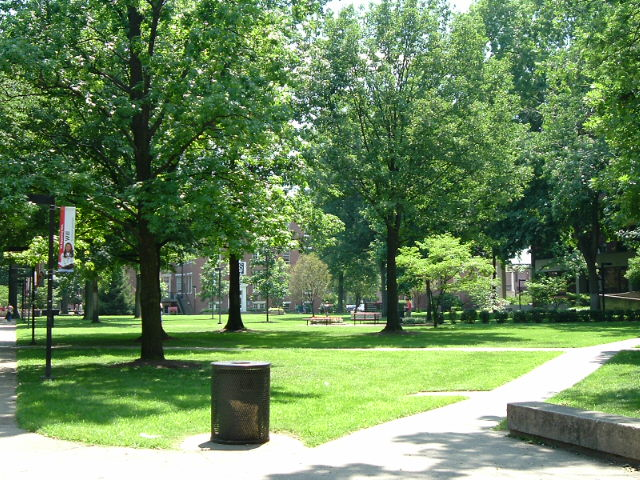
The Quad on the Belknap Campus

Other points of interest on the Belknap Campus include the Rauch Planetarium; the Covi Gallery of the Hite Art Institute, named for the painter Marcia Hite and her husband Allen; and the final resting place for former U.S. Supreme Court Justice Louis D. Brandeis and his wife Alice, under the portico in the Brandeis Law School. Surrounded by, but not part of the campus, is the Speed Art Museum, a private institution that is affiliated with the University of Louisville. The Kentucky State Data Center, the state's official clearing house for census data and estimates, is located next to Bettie Johnson Hall.

Since 2008 the school has purchased three large tracts of land adjacent to the Belknap Campus, 55 acres (220,000 m^{2}) to the school's northwest campus, 17 acres (69,000 m^{2}) to the school's east campus – south of Hahn and 39 acres (160,000 m^{2}) south of the Speed School of Engineering. New student housing has been completed on one of the northwest segments with student parking slated for the other. A new engineering and applied sciences research park is planned for the land south of the Speed School of Engineering. It serves as the centerpiece of a Signature Tax Increment Financing (TIF) district, designed to stimulate economic growth in an area around the university's Belknap campus. The TIF district covers more than 900 acres stretching from Belknap Campus south to the Watterson Expressway. The Kentucky Economic Development Finance Authority recently approved the TIF, paving the way for what could be an estimated $2.6 billion over 30 years.

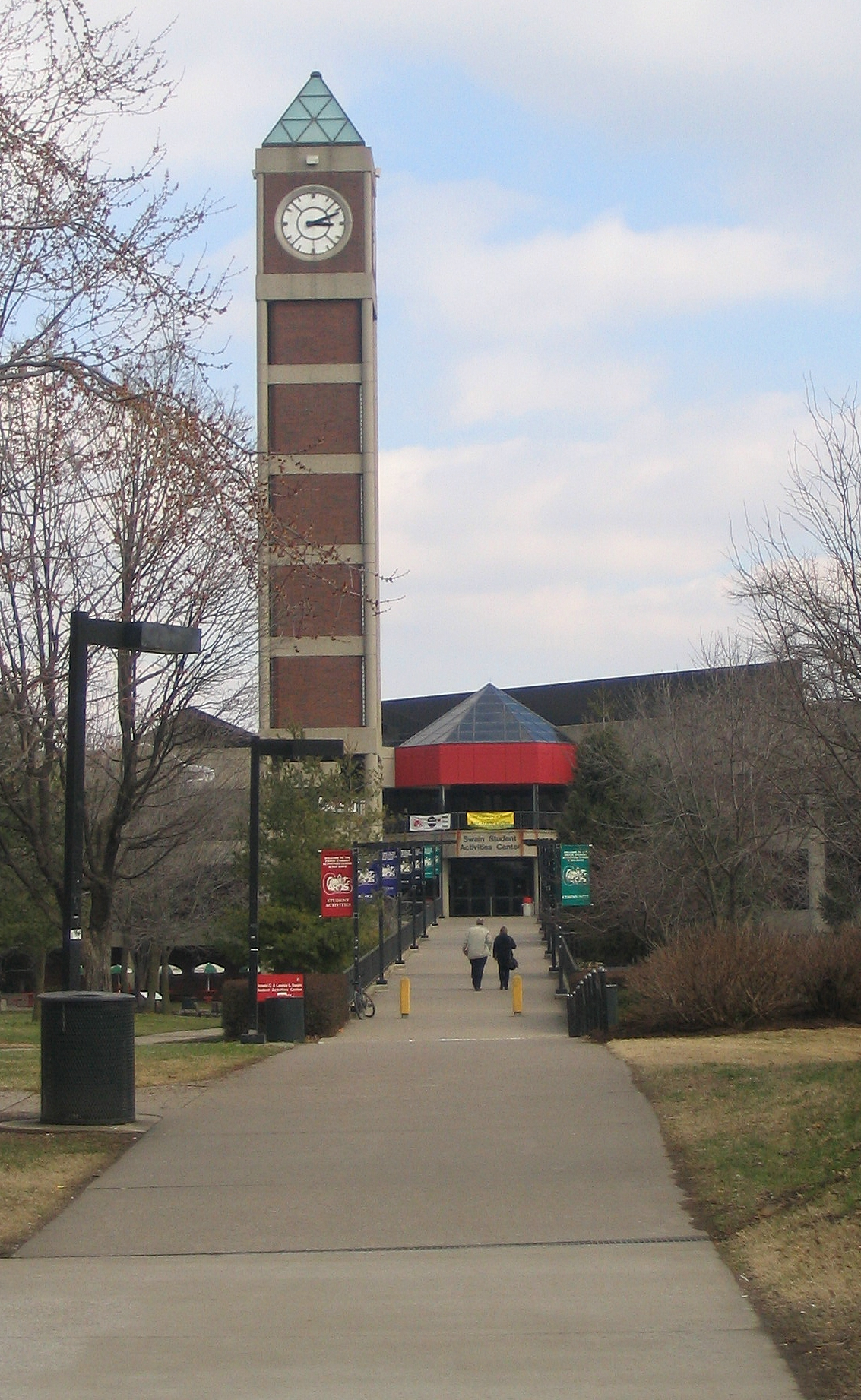
Student Activities Center and Clock Tower

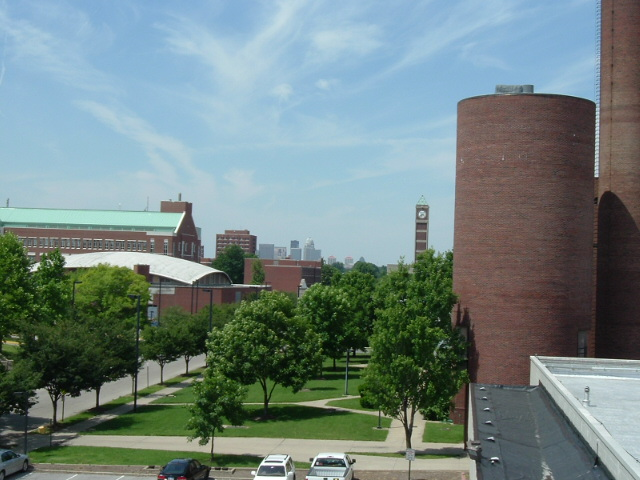
Belknap Campus from the Eastern Parkway overpass

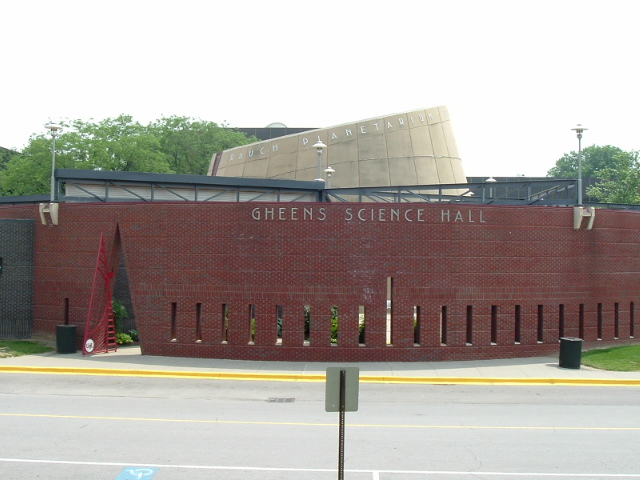
Rauch Planetarium

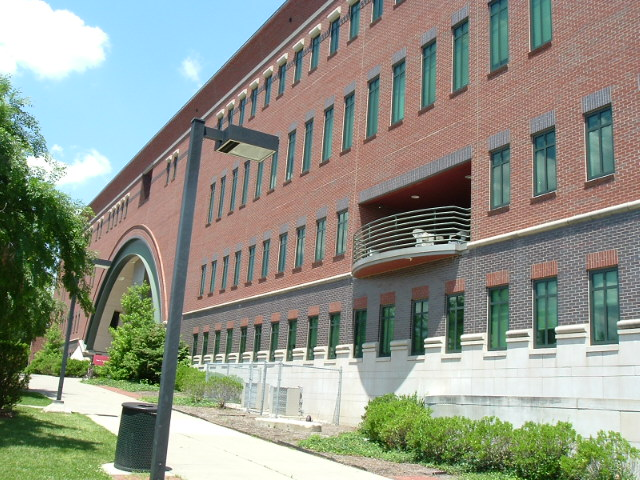
Lutz Hall is home to the departments of Sociology, Art History, Geography, Anthropology, and Engineering.

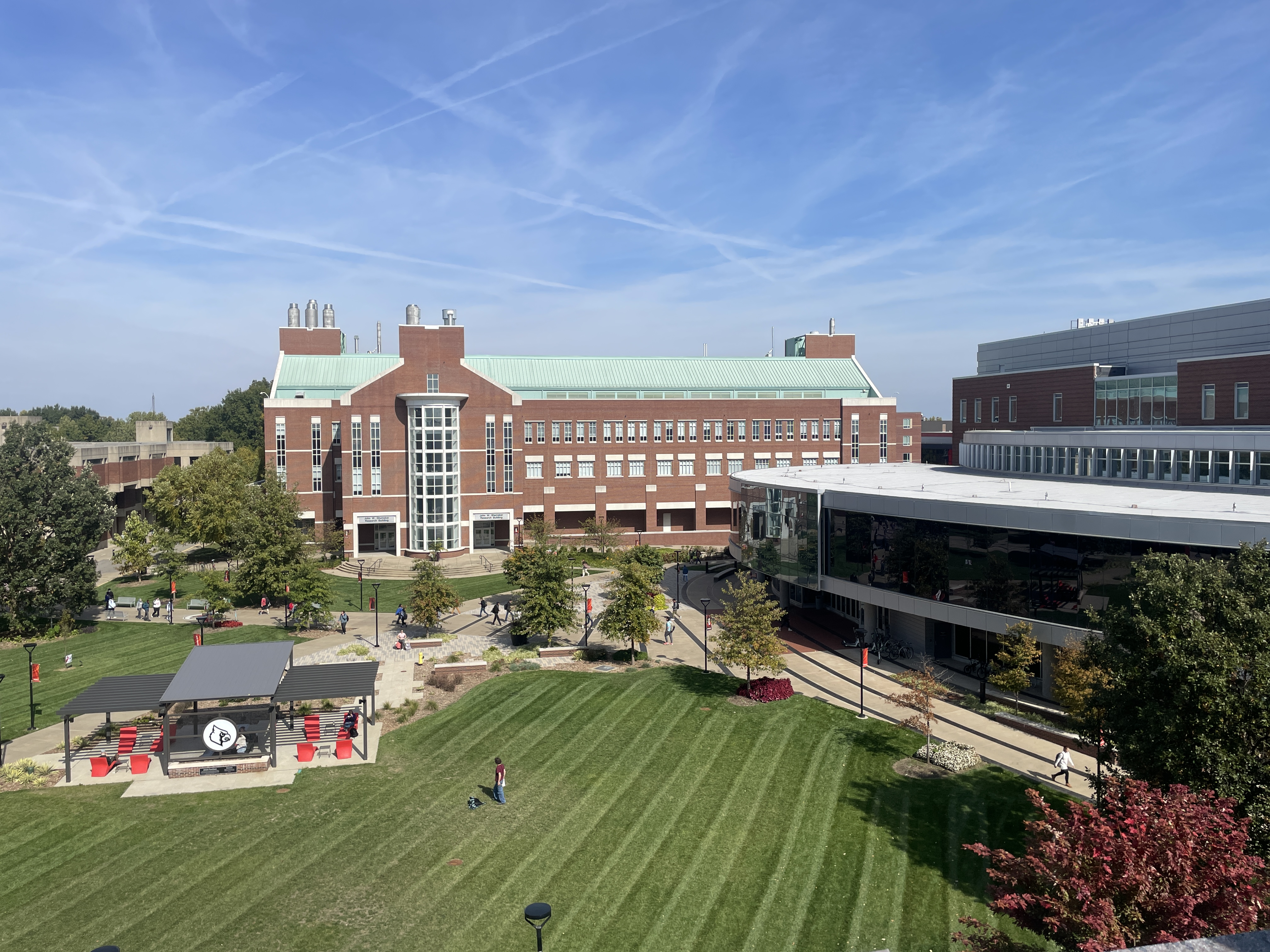
Shumaker Research Building and Belknap Academic Building as seen from Lutz Hall

==== Belknap Campus development projects ====
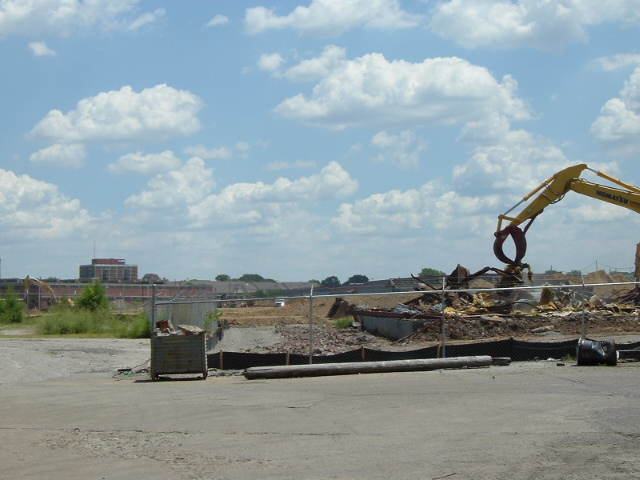
Construction for 2,000 new student housing units on Shipp Avenue in July 2008

In 2009, the university unveiled its new master plan for the next 20 years with efforts from the University of Louisville Foundation and other affiliate partners. Several important projects under construction or planned at that time included a new student recreation center, soccer stadium, new residence halls and academic buildings. Furthermore, the reconstruction of the I-65 ramps to the Belknap Campus, converting the four lanes of Eastern Parkway into a two-lane road with bike lanes and a landscaped median to improve pedestrian access to the Speed School, the moving of several university offices to allow the existing facilities at Arthur Street and Brandeis Avenue to be converted to commercial property and restaurants. The KFC Yum! Center (a men's basketball and volleyball practice facility) was completed in the fall of 2007. A 12,000-square-foot (1,100 m^{2}) Olympic sports training/rehab center adjacent to Trager Stadium is under construction. Trager Plaza, a small plaza with a fountain, statue, and garden has been built with donations by the Trager Family on the south part of campus. The $37.5 million Student Recreation Center, located on the Fourth Street corridor along the western border of campus, opened in October 2013. The Province, The Bellamy and Cardinal Towne are three new student housing developments built to the southwest of campus, near the recreation center. All three were built by private developers, and The Province was built in tandem with Louisville's properties. In the short term, university provost Shirley Willihnganz expects the university to continue partnerships with private entities to build student housing.

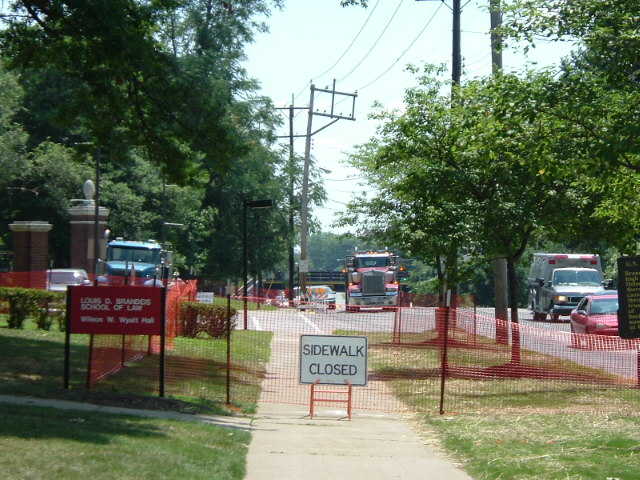
Reconstruction of the Oval at 3rd Street in July 2008

Several athletic facilities are being renovated, and the new $8 million academic center will be located beneath the Norton Terrace at the south end of Cardinal Stadium. It will be centrally located between two of the university's cornerstone buildings, the Swain Student Activities Center and Cardinal Stadium. It will have seating capacity for over 5,300 fans and will feature a 15,500 square foot training center that will include identical locker rooms for each team, coaches' offices and a sports medicine training room. This stadium will be the second-largest project the athletic department has undertaken behind Cardinal Stadium. Furthermore, a $4 million expansion of Jim Patterson Stadium includes the addition of 1,500 chair back seats, two-tiered ground level terraces, a visiting team locker room, and a 6,400 square foot terrace atop the chair back seats connecting the first and third base sides. The new Jim Patterson Stadium will have a total capacity of 5,000. Along with the $2.75 million expansion of the university's softball stadium will feature a team clubhouse with a locker room, a video room, and a players' lounge. The Dan Ulmer Stadium will see the addition of 200 chair back seats, bringing the seating capacity to 1,000. The project will add a 2,380 square foot fan terrace wrapping around the back of the stadium, as well as a new press box that will more than double its current size.

=== Health Sciences Campus ===
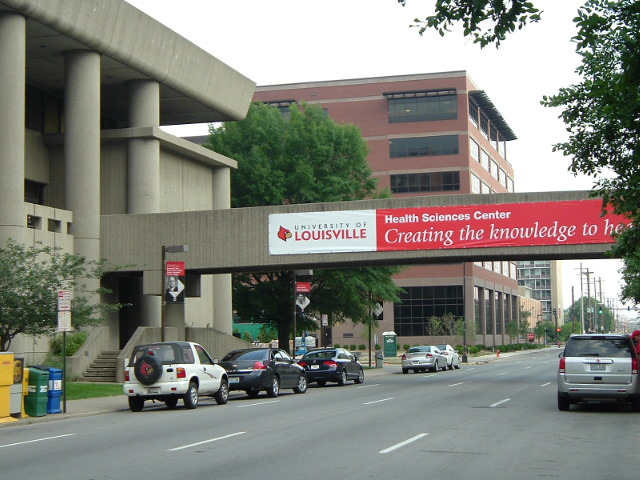
Preston Street on the university's Med Campus

The University Health Sciences Center, also called the med campus, is located just east of Downtown Louisville in the Louisville medical park which contains two other major hospitals and several specialty hospitals, and it houses the remaining five colleges. This is the school's original campus, being continuously used since 1846, although none of the original buildings remain. Buildings of note on the HSC include the fourteen story Medical Research Tower and the ten-story University Hospital. Construction is finished for a recently opened, downtown Louisville Cardiovascular Research Innovation Institute building to be directed by a researcher, Stuart Williams from the University of Arizona; and an eight-story, $70 million biomedical research building. Faculty and students also work with neighboring hospitals including Norton Children's Hospital, as well as outreach programs throughout Kentucky, including in Paducah, Campbellsville, and Glasgow.

In April 2026, UofL broke ground on the new Health Science Building, having an estimated cost of $280 million, which represents the largest single-project funding package in UofL's history. Located along Preston Street from Chestnut to Gray, it will be a connecting point for the UofL Schools of Dentistry, Medicine, Nursing and Public Health and Information Sciences. The same month, The UofL Health Sciences Center announced the development of a "Spine" pedestrian infrastructure located along East Chestnut Street, connecting the four anchor institutions of the Louisville Medical & Education District (LOUMED), UofL, UofL Health, Norton Healthcare, and Jefferson Community and Technical College. The Spine will also connect with the new one-acre LOUMED Commons, a public park opened in November 2025.

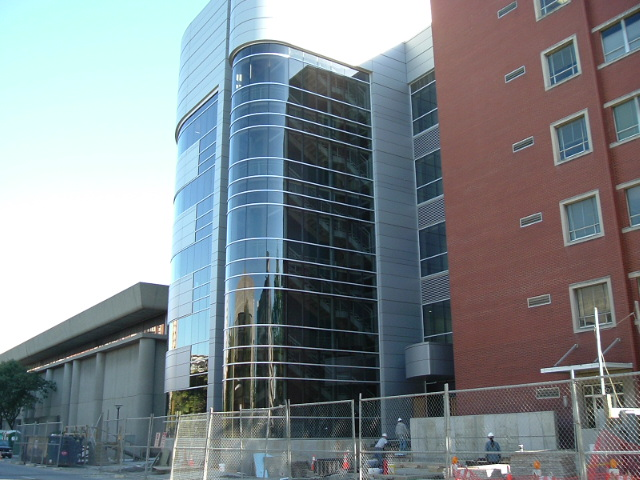
Cardiovascular Innovation Institute

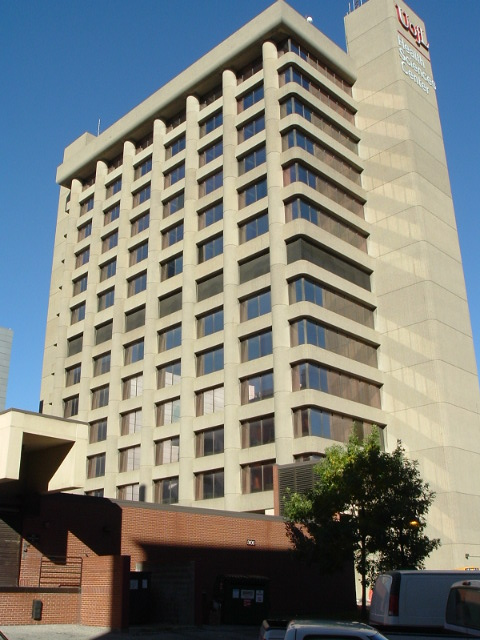
The university's Medical Research Tower

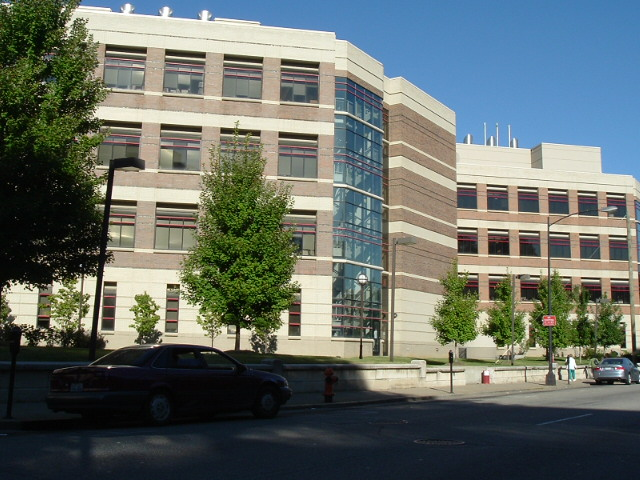
Baxter Research Building on the Louisville Health Sciences Campus

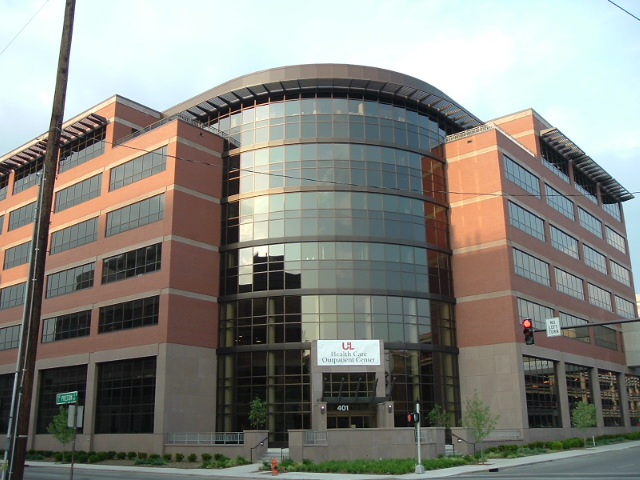
University Hospital Medical Plaza, completed in June 2008

==== Health Sciences Campus development projects ====
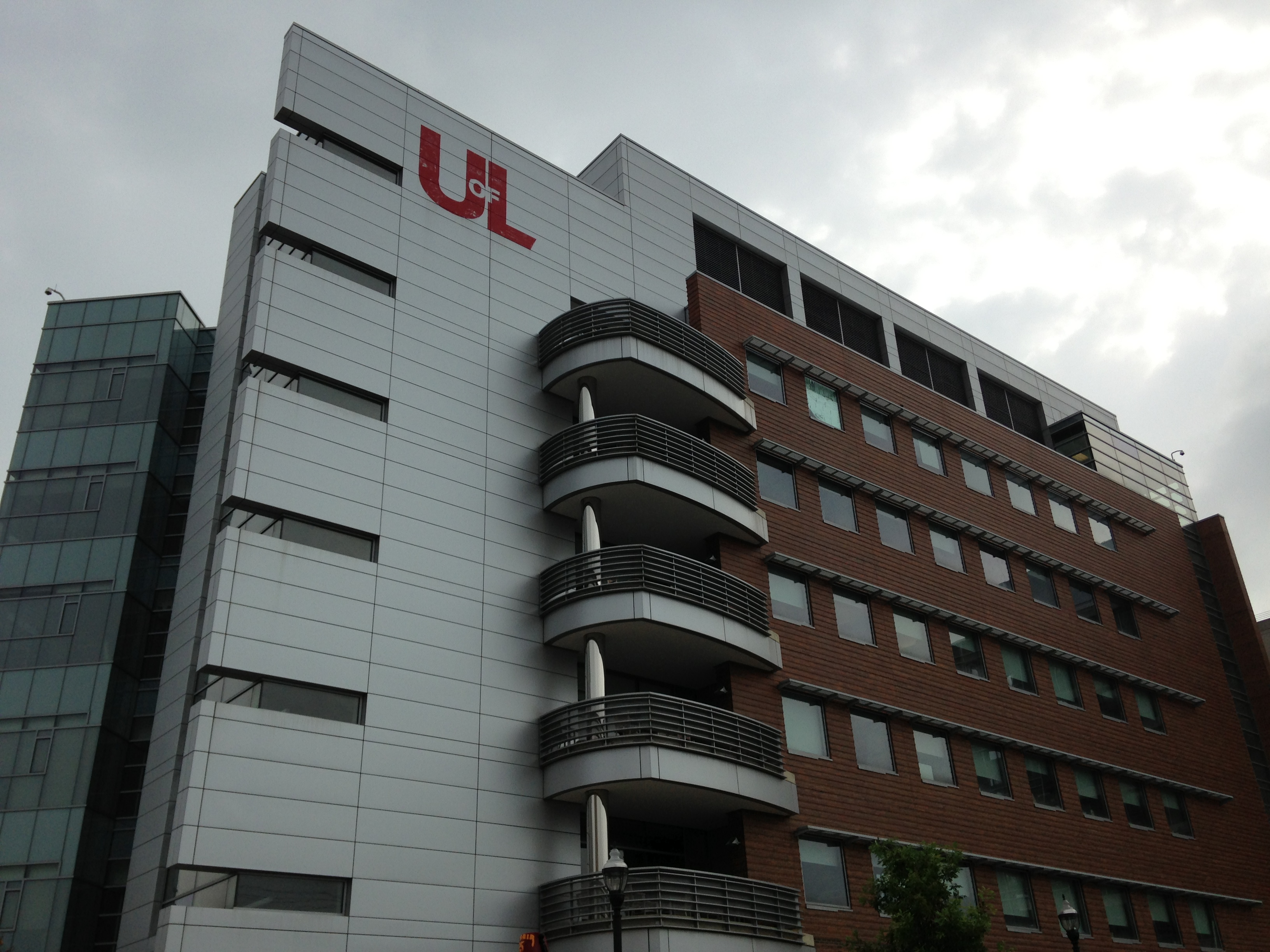
Clinical Translational Research Building at the University of Louisville Health Sciences Campus

The University of Louisville Health Sciences Campus has seen a large amount of new development in the past decade, include the completion of three new buildings: Baxter Research Complex, Cardiovascular Research Tower, and Jackson Street Medical Plaza.

In 2007 Louisville announced plans to create a nine-acre medical research park on the so-called Haymarket property roughly bounded by Market, Preston, Brook, and Jefferson Streets, along I-65 in Downtown Louisville, now called the Nucleus Research Park, with 1,000,000 square feet (93,000 m^{2}) of research space. Nucleus, Kentucky's Life Science and Innovation Center, was established in 2008 by the University of Louisville Foundation. Nucleus is assisting in the development of Louisville's Health Science Campus downtown.

Nucleus' work is integral to the development of the research park currently underway at Louisville's Haymarket 30-block property in downtown Louisville. Nucleus Innovation Park will house multiple facilities. The project is expected to cost $300 million and was planned to be constructed from 2009 to 2017. A 200,000-square-foot, eight-story, $18 million building, is the first in a series of structures, broke ground in July 2011, and was expected to open in June 2013.

An important project adjacent to the Downtown Health Sciences Campus was the conversion of the Clarksdale Housing Complex into a new mixed income development called Liberty Green.

=== Shelby Campus ===
The 230-acre (0.93 km^{2}) Shelby Campus is located on Shelbyville Road near Hurstbourne Parkway in Eastern Louisville. This campus was originally the home of Kentucky Southern College, a Kentucky Baptist liberal arts college that operated from 1961 to 1969. After the college folded, it transferred all its assets and liabilities to the university. It currently only has three buildings which are used for night classes and seminars, although construction of a $34.6-million Center for Predictive Medicine, a Level 3 biosafety facility, was in the works as of 2009.

The Shelby Campus is also home to the building which houses the Information Technology Resource Center (ITRC) for homeland security. The ITRC conducts communications and IT research for the U.S. Department of Homeland Security as well as seminars and training in emergency preparedness and response. When completed, the impressive ShelbyHurst Office Campus will have over 1.5 million square feet of modern office space managed, developed and leased by NTS Development Co., in partnership with the University of Louisville Foundation. The first three projects are in full swing.

The Shelby Campus is undergoing a major renovation, with two new entrances to the campus off Hurstbourne Parkway. The overall goal is to develop 108 acres (0.44 km^{2}) of the 230-acre (0.93 km^{2}) campus for business, office, technology and research use, now known as the ShelbyHurst Research and Office Park. The university will spend $7.9 million on the road improvements on the campus. The roadway improvements began in August 2008, with work on a new four-lane boulevard through the campus, bordered by bike lanes and sidewalks, and heavily landscaped. The 600 North Hurstbourne, at the northeast corner of ShelbyHurst, is a LEED-certified, 125,000-square-foot office building, that serves as corporate headquarters to Churchill Downs and others.

=== International Campus ===
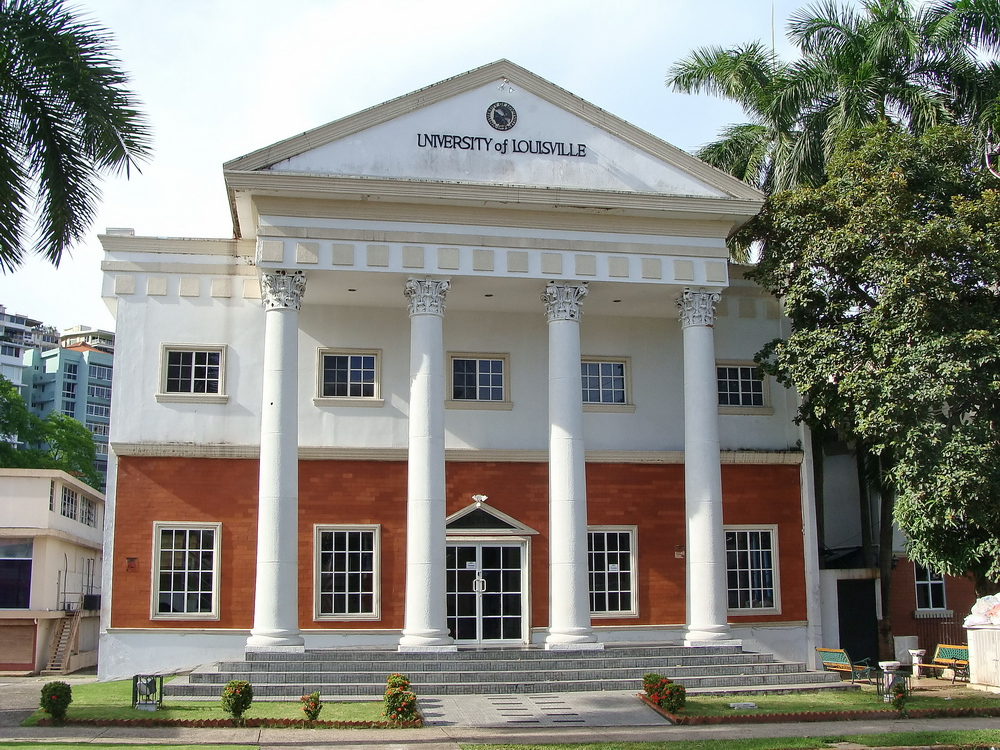
Campus in Panama City

The University of Louisville runs a sister campus in Panama City, Panama, which has an MBA program. The full-time program takes around 16 months to complete and enrolls about 200 students. It is currently ranked the 4th best MBA program in Latin America.

The university also offers professional MBA programs in Athens, Hong Kong, Singapore and other parts of Asia. Their collaboration partner in Singapore is Aventis School of Management.

=== Other facilities ===
Louisville operates the Moore Observatory in Oldham County, an astronomical observatory. There are plans to purchase several hundred acres in Oldham County for the school's equine program.

The president's mansion, Amelia Place, is located at 2515 Longest Avenue. It is the former residence of railroad executive Whitefoord Russell Cole.

== Academics ==
The University of Louisville offers bachelor's degrees in 70 fields of study, master's degrees in 78, and doctorate degrees in 22. According to the National Science Foundation, Louisville spent $176 million on research and development in 2018, ranking it 125th in the nation.

Through its School of Medicine and University Hospital, Louisville is known for its innovations in the field of medicine, including the world's first self-contained artificial heart transplant (2001), world's first successful hand transplant (1999), development of autotransfusion (1935), and first emergency department (1911).

=== Rankings ===
Academic rankings

National
- Forbes: 309
- U.S. News & World Report: 158
- Washington Monthly: 251
- WSJ/College Pulse: 251

Global
- ARWU: 601–700
- U.S. News & World Report: 667

U.S. News & World Report's 2025 edition ranked University of Louisville's undergraduate program tied for 158th among all national universities and tied for 84th among public ones. Forbes Magazine ranks the university 309th among 500 universities, colleges, and service academies.

=== Admissions ===
Admission to Louisville is considered "selective" by U.S. News & World Report. A total of 9,430 applications were received for the freshman class entering in fall 2015; 6,758 applicants were accepted (71.7%), and 2,797 enrolled. Men constituted 50.9% of the incoming class; women 49.1%.

Among freshman students who enrolled in Fall 2015, SAT scores for the middle 50% ranged from 490 to 620 for critical reading, and from 510 to 620 for math. ACT composite scores for the middle 50% ranged from 22 to 29. The average high school GPA for incoming freshmen was 3.60.

Admission statistics of the University of Louisville
First-time fall freshmen
	2024	2023	2022	2021	2020
Applicants	15,668	14,821	15,819	15,517	16,598
Admits	12,442	11,937	12,691	11,541	10,910
Admit rate	79.41%	80.54%	80.23%	74.38%	65.73%
Enrolled	3,120	3,117	2,931	2,695	2,866
Yield	25.08%	26.11%	23.10%	23.35%	26.27%
Average GPA	3.60	3.64	3.64	3.66	3.64
SAT range	1010–1230	1010–1220	1055–1245	1060–1260	N/A
ACT range	19–27	19–27	19–27	20–28	21–29
Fall transfers
Applicants	2,935	2,840	2,800	2,428	3,248
Admits	2,016	1,951	1,874	1,786	1,986
Admit rate	68.69%	68.70%	66.93%	73.56%	61.15%
Enrolled	1,026	967	960	851	904
Yield	50.89%	49.56%	51.23%	47.65%	45.52%

=== Schools and colleges ===
The university consists of 12 schools and colleges:

- College of Arts & Sciences (1907)
- College of Business (1953)
- College of Education & Human Development (1968)
- Graduate School (1918)
- J. B. Speed School of Engineering (1925)
- Raymond A. Kent School of Social Work and Family Science (1936)
- Louis D. Brandeis School of Law (1846)
- School of Dentistry (1887)
- University of Louisville School of Medicine (1837)
- School of Music (1932)
- School of Nursing (1979)
- School of Public Health and Information Sciences (1919–1924; reestablished in 2002)

=== UPS tuition reimbursement and Metropolitan College ===
In addition to their nationwide partial tuition reimbursement programs, UPS (United Parcel Service) offers Louisville (along with Jefferson Community and Technical College) students who work overnight at Worldport, the company's worldwide air hub at Louisville International Airport, full tuition reimbursement through a program called Metropolitan College. This program offers reimbursement for $65 of book costs for each class, and awards bonus checks to students in good standing at the end of each semester and upon reaching certain credit hour milestones. Employees are eligible for full health insurance coverage. Currently over 75 percent of the workers at the air hub are students.

=== Honors program ===
The university's honors program is under the direction of Joy Hart. Incoming freshmen can apply to be in the program if they meet the following requirements: a 3.5 cumulative high school GPA and a 29 on their ACT. Current students can apply for the honors program if they are able to maintain a cumulative GPA of 3.35 or higher. Courses through the program focus on reading, writing and discussion. Students in the honors program benefit from priority registration for classes, smaller class sizes, and unique study abroad opportunities.

== Libraries ==
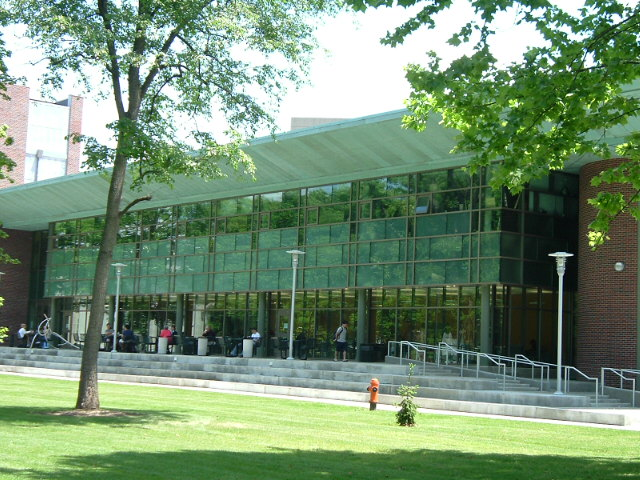
The Belknap Campus' Ekstrom Library

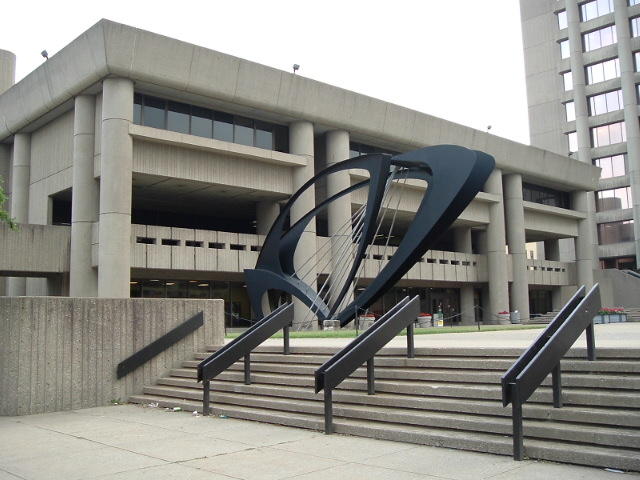
The Health Science Campus' Kornhauser Library

The University of Louisville library system is a member of the Association of Research Libraries. Louisville's main library branch is the William F. Ekstrom Library, which opened in 1981. The four-story building finished an expansion in March 2006, which increased its total size to 290,000 square feet (27,000 m^{2}) and shelving capacity to over 1.3 million books. It is one of only five universities in the U.S. to have a robotic retrieval system, which robotically places books in humidity-free bins. The University of Louisville libraries were the seventh academic institution in North America to have such a facility.

There are five other libraries at the university, with a combined total of more than 400,000 volumes of work:

- Archives and Special Collections
- The Margaret M. Bridwell Art Library
- Dwight Anderson Memorial Music Library
- Kornhauser Health Sciences Library
- Brandeis Law School Library

In 2009, the Kersey Library at the J. B. Speed School of Engineering was converted to an academic building named the Duthie Center for Engineering. The library's collection was fully integrated into Ekstrom Library on January 15, 2007.

== Enrollment statistics ==
=== Undergraduate student body ===
- Total enrollment is 25,005 as of fall 2025.
- 69.5% of students are Kentucky residents. (down from 76.2% in 2012).
- 41.0% of students are from Jefferson County (down from 64% in 1995)
- Average ACT score: 22.9 as of fall 2025 (up from 20.7 in 1995, down from 25.3 in 2014)
- 6-year graduation rate: 60.1% (2019) (up from 33% in 2004)

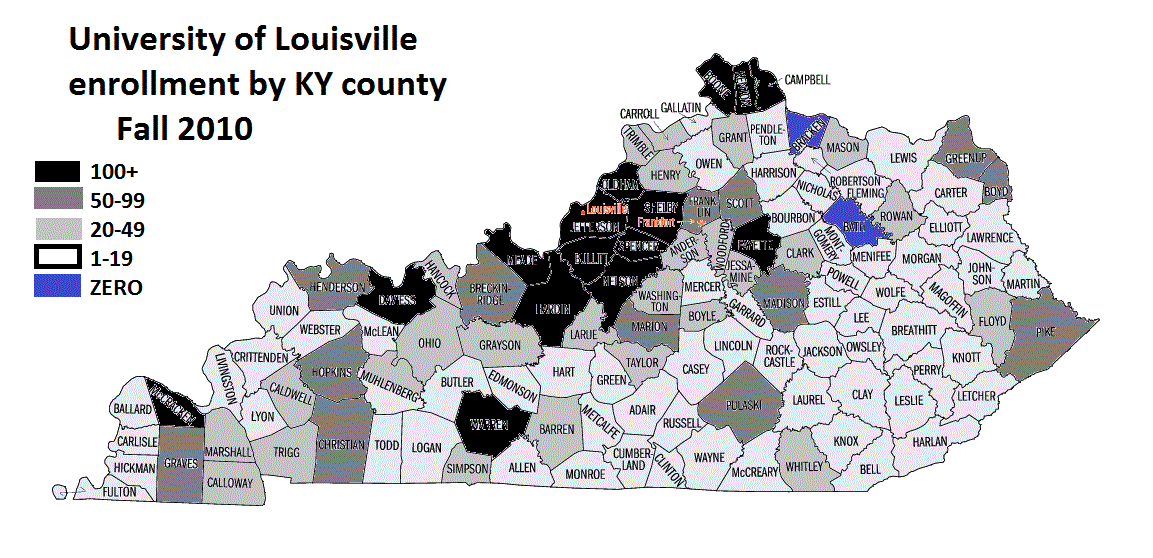
2010 enrollment map

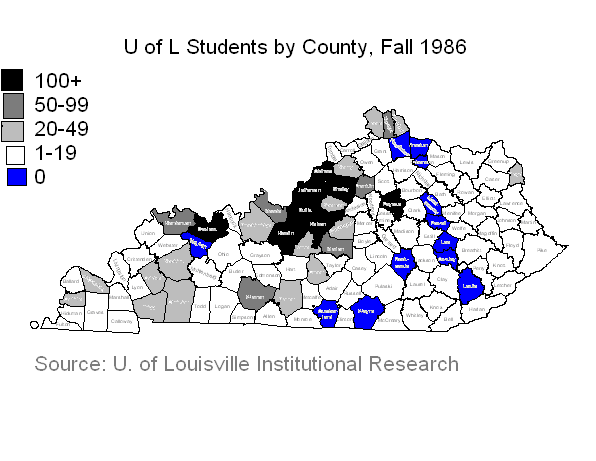
1986 enrollment map

Rank county	County	2025 enrollment
1	Jefferson (Louisville)	10,253
2	Oldham (La Grange)	1,043
3	Bullitt (Shepherdsville)	782
4	Hardin (Elizabethtown)	571
5	Fayette (Lexington)	452
6	Daviess (Owensboro)	330
7	Shelby (Shelbyville)	303
8	Boone (Florence)	281
9	Kenton (Covington)	247
10	Nelson (Bardstown)	220

== Student life ==
Undergraduate demographics as of fall 2023
Race and ethnicity	Total
White	63%
Black	16%
Hispanic	8%
Asian	6%
Two or more races	6%
International student	1%
Economic diversity
Low-income (Note: The percentage of students who received an income-based federal Pell grant intended for low-income students.)	33%
Affluent (Note: The percentage of students who are a part of the American middle class at the bare minimum.)	67%

=== Residence halls ===
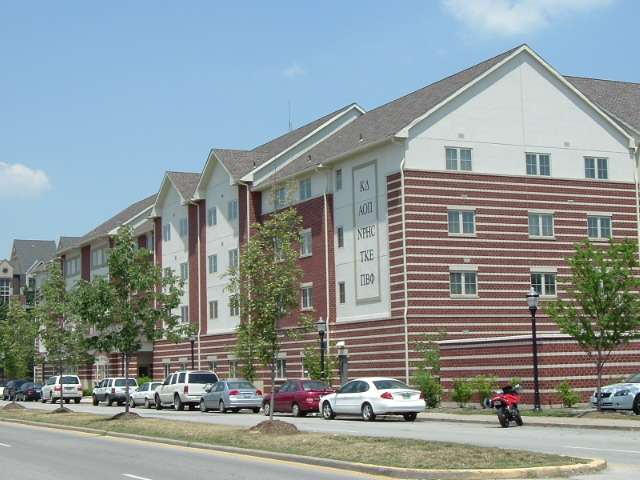
Community Park Greek residence hall on 4th Street

The university has 12 housing options on its campuses:

- Belknap Village North
- Belknap Village South
- Bettie Johnson Hall
- Billy Minardi Hall
- Cardinal Towne – It has an assortment of restaurants on the first floor.
- Community Park
- Denny Crum Hall – Named after Denny Crum, basketball coach from 1971 to 2001.
- Herman & Heddy Kurz Hall
- Louisville Hall
- Unitas Tower – Named after football player Johnny Unitas, who attended the school from 1950 to 1954. The tower is easily visible from many parts of campus and is located by the School of Music.
- University Pointe
- University Tower Apartments

=== Media ===
The university's student maintained online radio station, WLCV, was shut down at the beginning of the fall 2012 semester due to lack of funding. Louisville holds a prominent role in the city of Louisville's "Public Radio Partnership" which features three NPR stations under one roof, including the school's namesake WUOL-FM which broadcasts classical music. The school also holds one-third of the seats on the Partnership's board of directors.

There is also an independent student-run weekly newspaper, The Louisville Cardinal. The newspaper was founded in 1926, and has maintained financial and editorial independence since 1980. The newspaper is overseen by a board of local media professionals and run by a student editor-in-chief.

Inside the university's Student Activities Center is the Floyd Theatre, a 228-seat movie theater operated by the Student Activities Board. It is capable of running both 35 mm prints and DVD projection.

=== Greek life ===
There are over 20 Greek letter organizations on campus. As of 2022, approximately 14% of undergraduate men and 11% of undergraduate women are active in UofL's Greek system.

== Notable people ==
=== Alumni ===
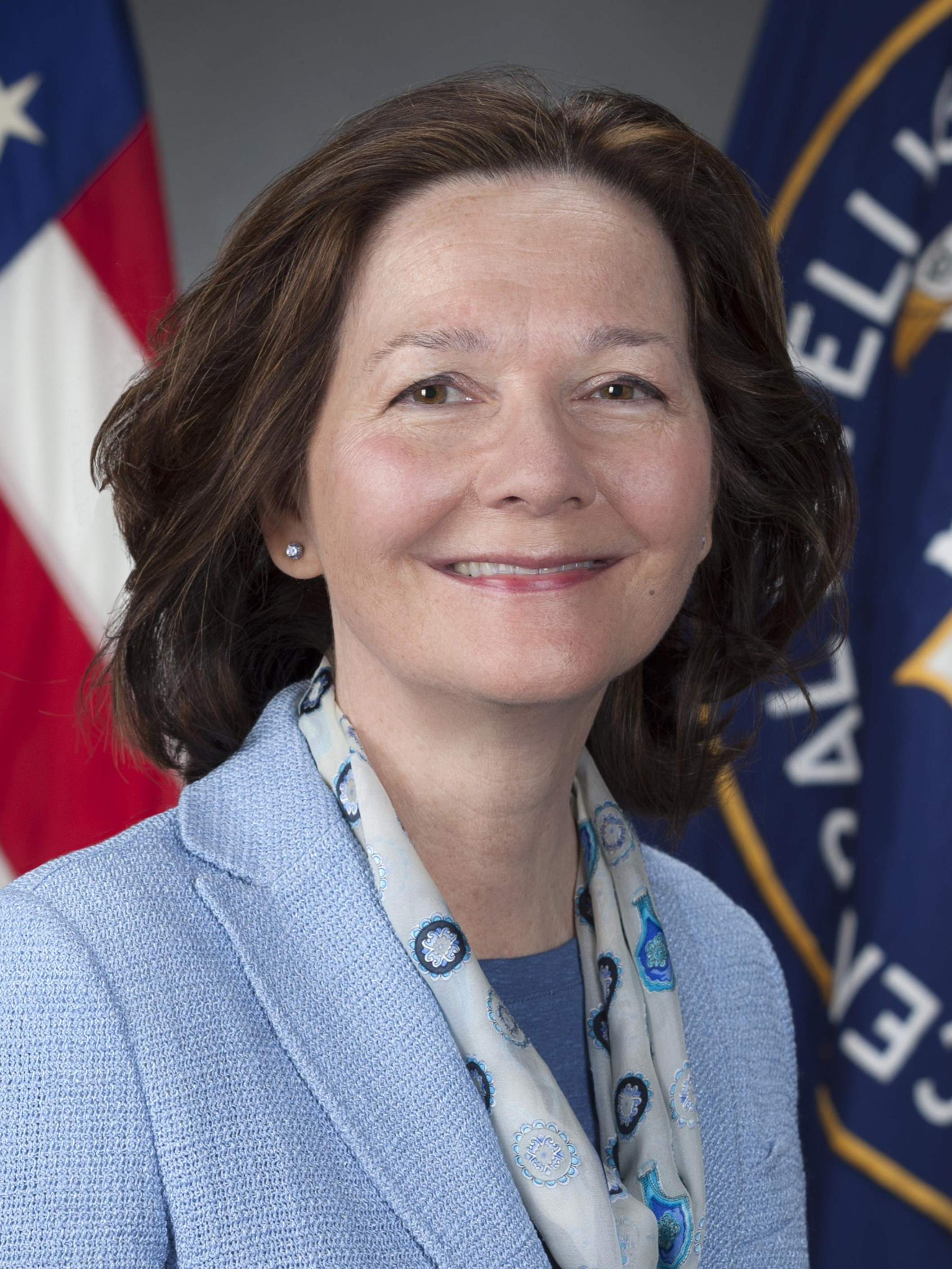
Gina Haspel, first female director of the CIA (BA 1978)

The university has more than 144,000 alumni residing in the United States and around the world.

The university claims as alumni a winner of the Pulitzer Prize for Theatre (Marsha Norman, BFA 1969), a 10-time NFL pro-bowler (Johnny Unitas), the 2016 Heisman Trophy winner (Lamar Jackson), 3x All-Star and World Series Champion Will Smith, a majority leader of the United States Senate (Mitch McConnell, BA 1964), the first female director of the CIA (Gina Haspel, BA 1978), the former Chancellor of the University of California, Berkeley (Chang-Lin Tien, MEng 1983) and many others including governors, senators, mayors, US attorneys and CEOs.

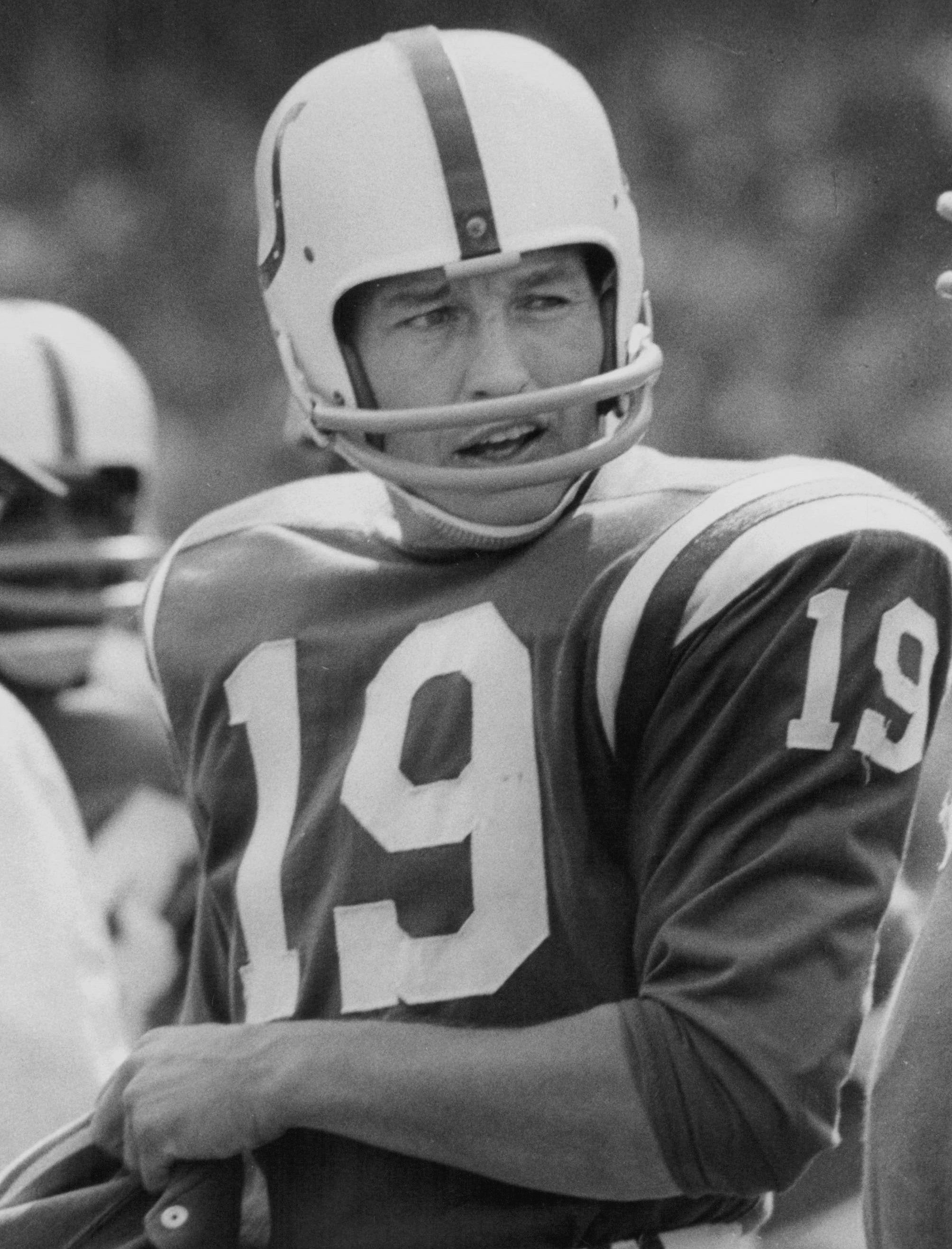
Louisville alumnus Johnny Unitas was three-time NFL MVP, four-time champion, and elected to its Hall of Fame.

== Athletics ==
The Louisville (UofL) athletic teams are called the Cardinals. The university is a member of the NCAA Division I ranks, primarily competing in the Atlantic Coast Conference (ACC) since the 2014–15 academic year. The Cardinals previously competed in the American Athletic Conference (The American; formerly known as the original Big East Conference until after the 2012–13 school year) from 2005–06 to 2013–14, and in Conference USA (C-USA) from 1995–96 to 2004–05.

UofL competes in 21 intercollegiate varsity sports. Men's sports include baseball, basketball, cross country, football, golf, soccer, swimming & diving, tennis and track & field; women's sports include basketball, cross country, field hockey, golf, lacrosse, rowing, soccer, softball, swimming & diving, tennis, track & field and volleyball.

=== Overview ===
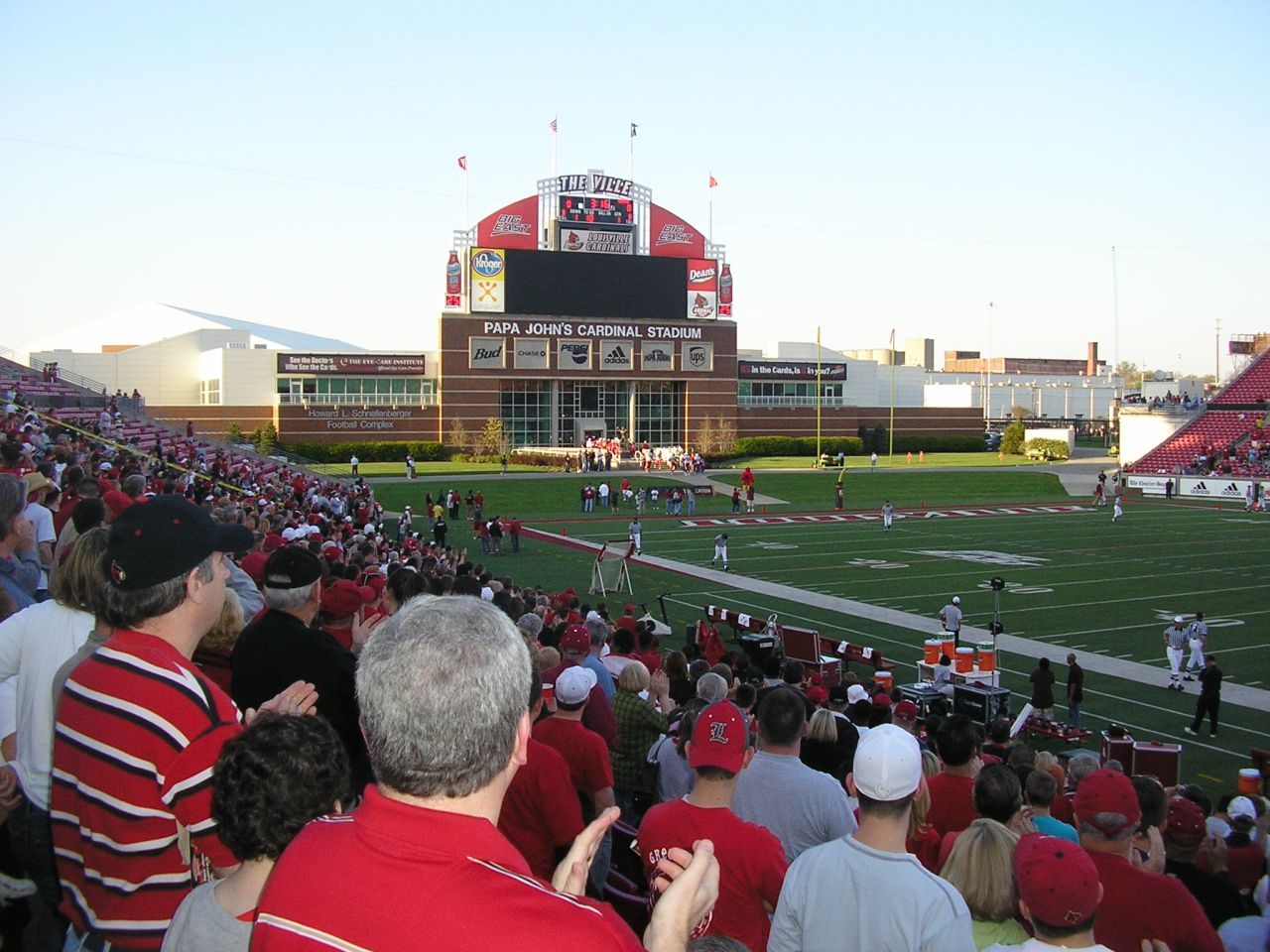
Pre-game ceremonies at Cardinal Stadium, home to Louisville Cardinals football

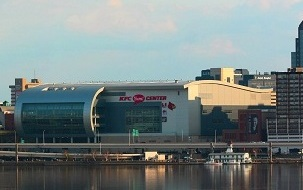
The KFC Yum! Center was completed in 2011 and is home to men's and women's basketball.

The Cardinals (commonly referred to as "the Cards") are the student athletes representing the university. There are 12 women's and 9 men's teams, all of which participate in the Atlantic Coast Conference. Louisville was invited to the ACC on November 28, 2012, and began play in 2014. The Cardinals are well known nationally in men's basketball with two national championships (2013 vacated) and 9 Final Four appearances (2013 vacated), ranking 5th in NCAA Tournament wins, 9th in winning percentage, and from 2nd to 5th in annual attendance every year since 1984. For the 2015–16 season, the men's basketball team held a self-imposed postseason ban due to a sex scandal involving recruits and former players. The NCAA put the Louisville men's basketball program on four years probation in June 2017 and imposed a number of penalties including a suspension of head coach Rick Pitino, a reduction of scholarships and 123 vacated games as a result of its investigation into the program's stripper scandal.

In recent years other Cardinal teams have gained national prominence. The women's basketball team, coached by Jeff Walz and led by first team All-American Shoni Schimmel, has been to two straight Sweet 16s and have been ranked in the top 10. In December 2008 the Cardinals broke the Big East paid attendance record when 17,000 fans filled Freedom Hall to watch the Cards defeat rival Kentucky, and later that season advanced to the NCAA championship game, losing to Connecticut. The Cardinals returned to the NCAA final behind Native American star Shoni Schimmel in 2013, losing again to Connecticut, The following season, the Cardinals filled the KFC Yum! Center with over 22,000 fans, including an estimated 1,500 Native Americans from 40 states, for the final scheduled home game of the graduating Schimmel. Other Louisville teams with recent post season success includes track and field (two individual national championships), volleyball (consecutive Sweet 16 appearances and a three-peat as Big East Tournament Champions from 2008 to 2010, and Atlantic Coast Conference Champions in 2015) and baseball (two College World Series appearances and consecutive Big East conference titles). The volleyball team has also accomplished achievements such as Head Coach Anne Kordes being named Coach of the Year in 2015, Senior Setter for Louisville, Katie George being named Atlantic Coast Conference Player of the Year, and Freshman Libero, Molly Sauer being named Freshman of the Year and Defensive Player of the Year.

All Louisville locally broadcast games airing on the school's flagship affiliate WHAS-TV Louisville are televised on every cable provider in Kentucky.

== See also ==
- List of colleges and universities in Kentucky
- McConnell Center
- Metro-College
