= Jefferson Community and Technical College =

Public college in Louisville, Kentucky, US

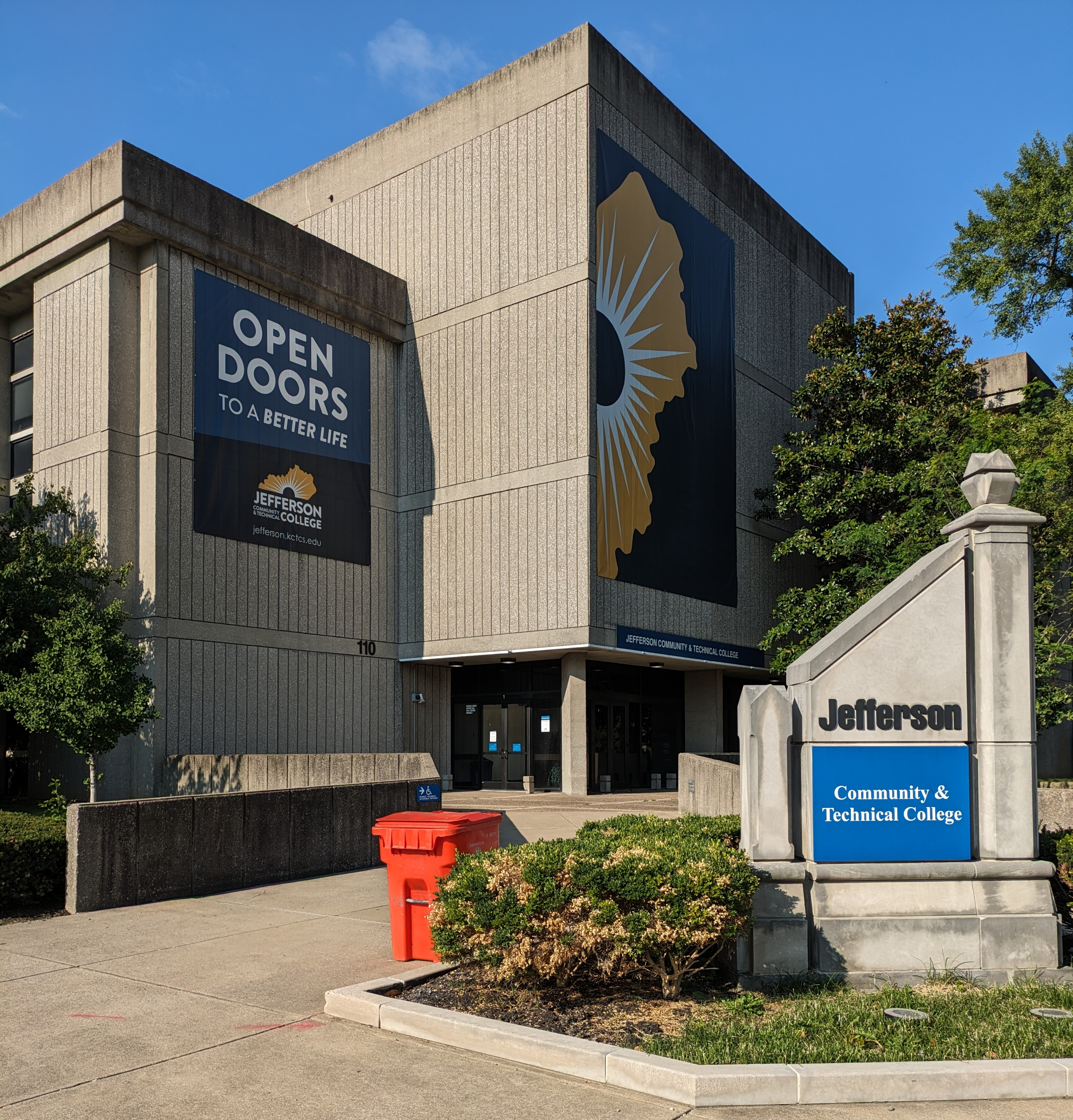
- Type: Public community college
- Established: 2005
- Parent institution: Kentucky Community and Technical College System
- Affiliations: Kentuckiana Metroversity
- President: Ty Handy
- Students: 11,982
- Location: Louisville, Kentucky, United States; 38.24670°N 85.75220°W
- Colors: Navy █ and Gold █
- Website: jefferson.kctcs.edu

Jefferson Community and Technical College (JCTC) is a public community college in Louisville, Kentucky. It is part of the Kentucky Community and Technical College System and the largest college in that system. JCTC was formed on July 1, 2005, by the consolidation of Jefferson Community College and Jefferson Technical College. Jefferson Community College was originally chartered in 1968 and Jefferson Technical College (originally Jefferson County State Vocational-Technical School and later Kentucky TECH, Jefferson Campus) was chartered in 1953. JCTC is accredited by the Southern Association of Colleges and Schools (SACS).

== Students ==
In the Fall 2016 semester, Jefferson's total headcount was 11,982 students. The student body is 55.4% female, 43.3% male with 1.3% undisclosed. Minority enrollment included 19% African-American students (who declare ethnicity). There are 40 different languages spoken on campus.

== Service area ==
The primary service area of JCTC includes:

- Bullitt County
- Carroll County
- Gallatin County
- Henry County
- Jefferson County
- Nelson County
- Oldham County
- Owen County
- Shelby County
- Spencer County
- Trimble County

== Academics ==
The college offers associate degrees, diplomas, and certificates.

== Campuses ==
JCTC has six campuses, all in Kentucky. Three are in the Louisville Metro governmental area and three are in other counties:

- Louisville campuses:
  - Downtown (Downtown Louisville)
  - Jefferson Technical (Downtown Louisville)
  - Southwest (Valley Station)
- Outlying campuses:
  - Carrollton, Carrollton
  - Shelby County, Shelbyville
  - Bullitt County, Shepherdsville

The largest campus is the Downtown Campus at Second and Broadway in Downtown Louisville, which enrolls more than 7,200 students a year. A second campus, Jefferson Technical Campus, is just seven blocks west and is home to many of the college's technical and trades programs. The Southwest Campus is located in southwestern Jefferson County, just off the Gene Snyder Freeway. The Southwest Campus is home to the college's Technology and Related Sciences program. Jefferson's newest campus is in Bullitt County and prepares students to transfer to university or to the college's technical programs. The Carrollton Campus has programs in Practical Nursing, Industrial Chemical Technology, and Industrial Maintenance Technology, as well as the Associate in Arts and Associate in Science transfer degrees. The Shelby County Campus has programs in Practical Nursing, Industrial Maintenance Technology and Machine Tool Technology, as well as the Associate in Arts and Associate in Science transfer degrees.

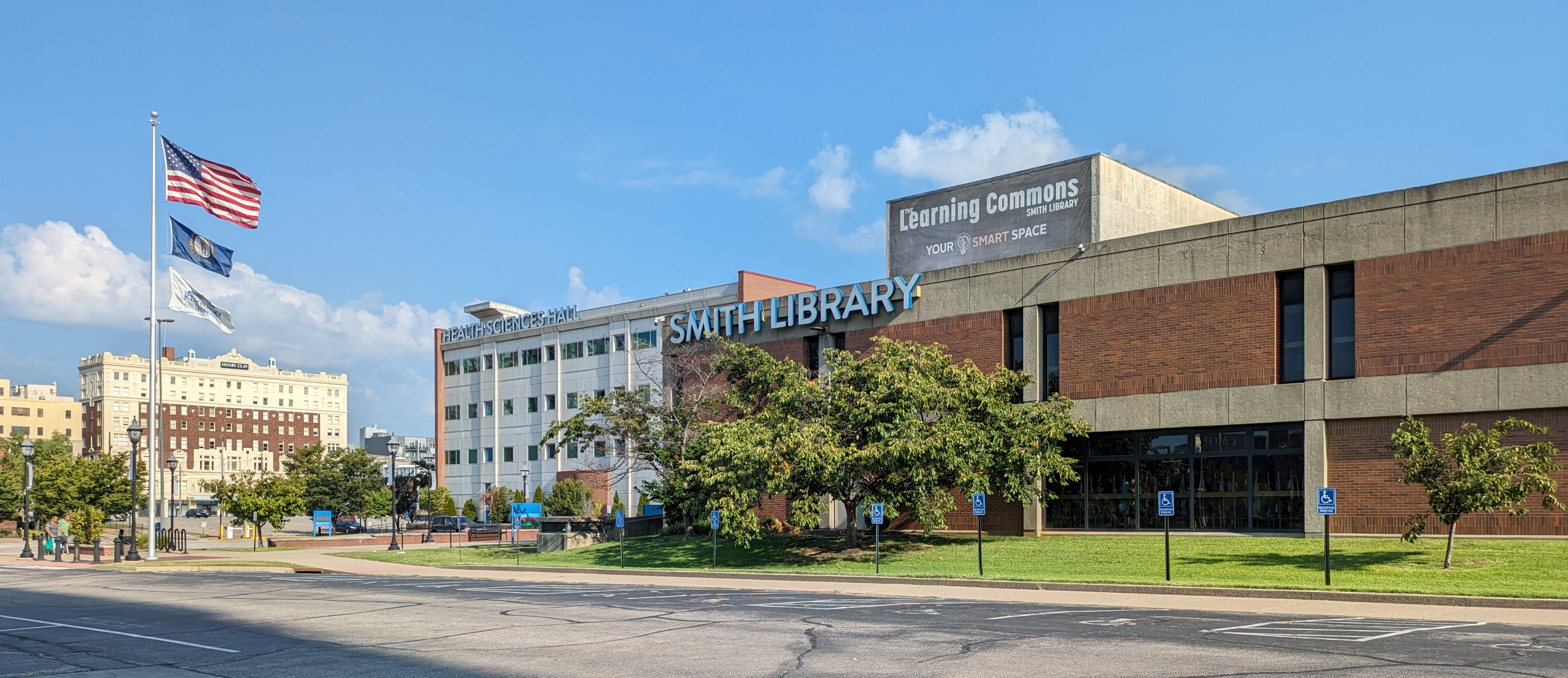
Health Sciences Hall and Smith Library

In 2010, the Jefferson Community & Technical College completed construction of the new $25.6 million Health Sciences Building at Second and Chestnut Street at its Downtown Louisville Campus. It is a four-story, 100,000-square-foot (9,300 m^{2}) instructional building for allied health programs. The project includes a small clinic, laboratory space, library, a conference center, faculty offices, and student and teacher lounges.

== See also ==
- Metro-College
