= Edward Mann Butler =

Edward Mann Butler (July 13, 1784 – November 1, 1855) was one of Kentucky's most prominent early educators. He is best remembered as being the first president of what would become the University of Louisville and heading the first public school in Kentucky.

Butler was born in Baltimore. After graduating from St Mary's College, Butler practiced law and served as a school teacher in various locations, including Maysville, Lexington, Versailles and Louisville. He was the president of the Jefferson Seminary (which later became the University of Louisville) from 1813 to 1816. In 1822 he became the head of the grammar department at Lexington's Transylvania University, and then returned to head the Jefferson Seminary in 1829.

Butler was a trustee at Washington University. He is also considered Kentucky's first reliable historian, with his first complete work being released in 1834. At the time of his death, he was working on a detailed history of the Ohio River Valley. He was killed on November 1, 1855, in a St. Louis train wreck.
