= Andrew D. Holt =

Andrew David Holt (December 4, 1904 – August 7, 1987) was an American educator who was the 16th president of the University of Tennessee, filling that position from 1959 to 1970.

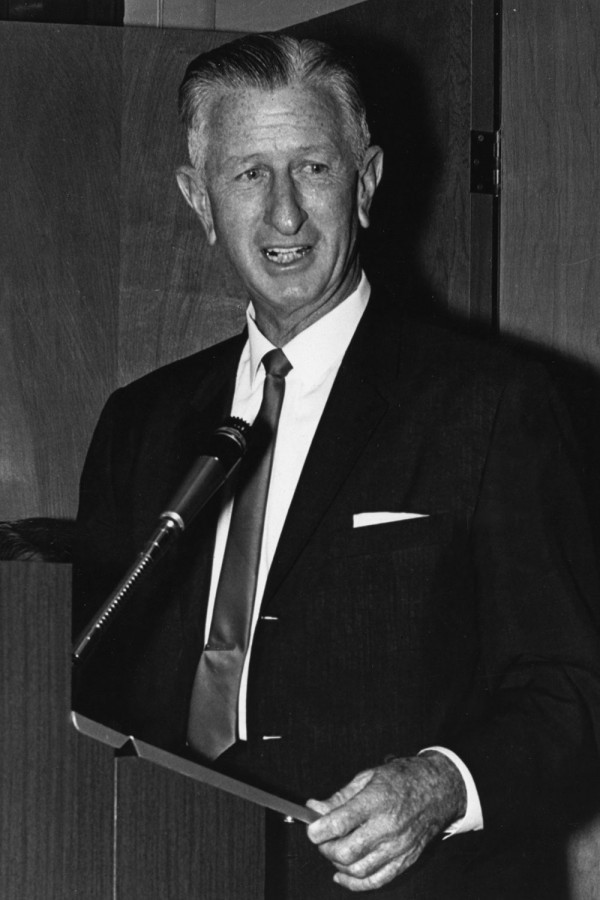
Dr. Andrew D. Holt (c. 1959)

Holt was born in Milan, Tennessee in 1904, the son of two schoolteachers. He graduated from Milan High School and Emory University. After his college graduation in 1927, he became a teacher in West Tennessee, first in Milan, where he taught grades five through eight, and then in Humboldt, where he taught high school. He also worked as a coach, a school principal, and a school superintendent. After less than 10 years of teaching, he joined the faculty of West Tennessee State Teachers College (now the University of Memphis), where he served successively as principal of the Training School, director of teacher training, and professor of educational administration. While working in Memphis, he enrolled in a graduate program at Teachers College, Columbia University, which awarded him a Ph.D. degree in 1937. His doctoral dissertation at Columbia was about the continuing struggle for public support of education in Tennessee.

After receiving his Ph.D., Holt started a new job as executive secretary of the Tennessee Education Association (TEA).

In 1949 he became president of the National Education Association, after having been elected first vice president in 1948.

In 1950 he left the TEA to join the University of Tennessee as executive assistant to university president Cloide Brehm. In 1953 he became the university's vice president, and after Brehm's retirement in 1959 the university's trustees appointed him to the university presidency.

Retired University Historian Milton Klein has described Holt's leadership of the University of Tennessee system as "marked by a burst of energy unsurpassed in the University's history." During Holt's tenure as president, enrollment increased threefold and the faculty and staff doubled in number. Eight new buildings were built on the university's flagship campus in Knoxville. The university budget and state government funding for its support both increased fourfold. During Holt's presidency, he worked with the board of trustees in 1960 to change the university's admissions policy to accept African Americans. The first black underclassmen were enrolled in January 1961.

Holt died in Knoxville on August 7, 1987.

The University of Tennessee administration building, Andy Holt Tower, completed in 1973, and a street on the university's Knoxville campus, Andy Holt Avenue (formerly Rose Avenue), are named in his honor. The largest dormitory on campus, a 15-story building that is officially named Apartment Residence Hall, is located on Andy Holt Avenue and is commonly called "Andy Holt Apartments", or just "Andy Holt". The building is in the process of being demolished.
