= Jan Simek =

American archaeologist (born 1953)

Jan F. Simek

Interim Chancellor of the University of Tennessee, Knoxville
- In office 2008–2009
- Preceded by: Loren Crabtree
- Succeeded by: Jimmy Cheek

Jan F. Simek (born April 15, 1953) is an American archaeologist and educator who was the interim president of the University of Tennessee system from 2009 to 2010.

A faculty member in the department of anthropology at the University of Tennessee, Knoxville, Simek's research interests include Paleolithic archaeology, human evolution, quantitative analysis, spatial analysis, archaeology of the southeastern United States, and cave archaeology. He has been involved in the discovery and exploration of numerous “Unnamed Caves”, a naming practice used to protect their location, in the Cumberland Plateau for the past fifteen years. He has been instrumental in the discovery of prehistoric artwork; dating back thousands of years. He has also conducted important research in France at Neanderthal habitation sites.

Before his stint as interim president of the University of Tennessee system, he served in leadership and administration positions including department head, interim Director of the School of Art, interim Dean of Architecture and Design, and interim Chancellor of the University of Tennessee Knoxville.

== Early life and education ==
Simek was born April 15, 1953, in Glen Cove, New York. His mother, Susan Tours Simek, served in the U.S. Navy during World War II and worked after the war at the new Radio Free Europe in Germany, where she met her future husband, Vasek. His father, Vasek Simek, was a Czechoslovakia-born New York theater director and Hollywood character actor whose roles included Soviet premiers, Russian chess players, and ambiguously “foreign” scientists. Jan Simek grew up in California.

Simek received a bachelor's degree from the University of California, Santa Cruz in 1976 and master's and Ph.D. degrees from the Binghamton University in 1978 and 1984, respectively.

== Career ==
Simek began his career research in Europe where he studied Neanderthal habitation sites. He and his colleague, Jean-Phillippe Riguad, began excavating a site in southwestern France, called Grotte XVI, in the mid-1980s. Their research has aided in the understanding of Neanderthal ways of life. Specifically, Simek and Riguad found evidence revealing more sophisticated Neanderthal behavior than what was widely thought possible. Their discovery of well-preserved fireplaces, including ashes of several different types of wood as well as different grasses, within Grotte XVI, suggests that Neanderthals may have been using fire in complex ways. The types of grasses found in the fireplace remains would have had to be carried in from outside the cave, dried, and then used to start fires. Furthermore, evidence was found to suggest that Neanderthals may have even been using the grasses to create enough smoke to repel mosquitoes. The presence of fish bones in the cave suggested that Neanderthals were smoking fish for later use. Simek’s research discoveries provide contrasting evidence against the idea that Neanderthals were incapable of planning ahead, or imagining the future.

He joined the faculty of the University of Tennessee anthropology department in 1984 and advanced in rank to become a distinguished professor of anthropology. In addition to his faculty duties, he served the university as head of the anthropology department, interim director of the School of Art, and interim dean of the College of Architecture and Design. He was interim chancellor of the university's Knoxville campus for one year (from January 2008 to January 2009), after having been chief of staff to the chancellor from 2005 to 2008. He became acting president of the university system on March 1, 2009, after John D. Petersen announced his resignation, and he became interim president on July 1, 2009, when Petersen's resignation became official.

He has conducted archaeological research in France, Italy, Croatia, California, and Tennessee, and has spent time at the University of Washington, the University of Bordeaux, and the Autonomous University of Barcelona as a visiting faculty member.

== Research ==
Inspired by one of his colleagues, Charles Faulkner, Simek developed a passion for ancient cave art in Tennessee. Although petroglyphs had been noticed on Tennessee cave walls for years, Faulkner was the first to conduct an archaeological study of the artwork in 1979. Faulkner’s study inspired Simek to pursue his own research of early southeastern prehistoric cave art. Since 1979, many other caves have been discovered. Sites such as- Third Unnamed Cave, provide contextual information on dark zone cave art. The findings in these caves force scholars to rethink the analytic and interpretive approaches used in considering Southeastern cave art. The archaeological contents of the cave were not fully appreciated until Simek and a team of archaeologists from the University of Tennessee spent time researching and documenting detailed findings of the cave. more than 15,000 artifacts were mapped and recovered from Third Unnamed Cave. This same attention to detail has become a recurring practice in the caves Simek and his colleagues continue to visit. While many of the caves yielding art have been dated back to the Mississippian period, some images are thought to be from the Woodland and even Archaic period. Third Unnamed Cave, for example, possesses the same kind of characteristics such as simple shapes, meandering lines, and geometric patterns similar to other cave art depictions dated to be Archaic.

Simek became the founder of the Cave Archeology Research Team at the University of Tennessee in 1996. The team has gone on to produce substantial findings which offer a glimpse into once lost Native American cultures and traditions. Many of the cave images exemplify classic Southeastern Ceremonial Complex (SECC) iconography, which is found widely in Eastern North America in the centuries around 1200 A.D., a part of Mississippian culture that is yet to be fully understood.

Much of the artwork related to the SECC is quite gruesome, which has inspired some archaeologists to refer to it as the “Southern Death Cult”. Recurring images include the Toothy Mouth, a round, severed head with gore spilling out of the neck. The face encases weeping eyes and an exaggerated grin. This image is commonly found where dead are buried.

== Awards and honors ==
- 2013 — Patty Jo Watson Award for best article or book chapter about southeastern archaeology, Southeastern Archaeological Conference
- 2002 — University Citation for Extraordinary Community Service, University of Tennessee
- 2001 — Distinguished Professor of Science, University of Tennessee, Present
- 2001 — University Award for Research and Creative Achievement, University of Tennessee
- 2001 — College of Arts and Sciences Public Service Award, University of Tennessee
- 2000 — Marshall of College of Arts and Sciences Convocation, University of Tennessee
- 1996 — Certificate of Appreciation for Valuable Service to our Natural Heritage. Tennessee Valley Authority Regional Natural Heritage Project
- 1991 — Commencement Flagbearer, College of Liberal Arts. University of Tennessee.
- 1987 — Phi Beta Kappa Certificate of Merit for scholarly achievements in the Social Sciences.
- 1980 — University Fellow. State University of New York, Binghamton.
- 1976 — Honors in Anthropology. University of California, Santa Cruz.
- 1974 — National Science Foundation Undergraduate Research Participation Award.

== Fieldwork ==
- 2002–Present — Co-director of archaeological survey of Fall Creek Falls State Park(Tennessee) with N. Herrmann and S. Sherwood.
- 1992–Present — Director, fieldwork at various dark zone prehistoric cave art sites in the southeastern USA.
- 1984-2002 — Co-director of excavations at the Grotte XVI (Dordogne, France), with J-Ph. Rigaud
- 1986 — Excavator at La Micoque, (Dordogne, France), Directed by J-Ph. Rigaud and A. Debenath.
- 1985-1986 — Analysis of Krapina stone tool assemblage (Croatia).
- 1983 — Test excavations at the Grotte XVI (Dordogne, France), with J-Ph. Rigaud.
- 1978-1984 — Field supervisor for excavations at Le Flageolet I (Dordogne, France), Directed by J-Ph. Rigaud.
- 1981 — Excavator at Combe Sauniere, Laugerie Basse, and Grotte Maldidier. All in Dordogne, France.
- 1979-1980 — Research on Aurignacian materials from Le Flageolet I (Dordogne, France), Direction des Antiquites Prehistoriques d'Aquitaine, Directed by J-Ph. Rigaud.6
- 1979 — Field supervisor for excavations at Piana Di Curinga (Calabria, Italy), Directed by A. Ammerman.
- 1979 — Survey and intensive surface collection at Burrone Scierra I (Calabria, Italy).
- 1976-1979 — Excavator at the Abri Vaufrey (Dordogne, France), Directed by J-Ph. Rigaud.
- 1976-1977 — Excavator at Le Flageolet II (Dordogne, France), Directed by J-Ph. Rigaud.
- 1974 — Excavator, University of Arizona Undergraduate Fieldschool in Archaeology. Directed by J. Fritz and W. Longacre.
- 1973 — Site Survey in Southwestern Michigan; Excavator at Schmidt Site, Directed by E. Baldwin.
- Various CRM survey and excavation technical reports

== Publications ==
=== Selected articles ===
- 2005. J. F. Simek and A. Cressler. Images in Darkness: Prehistoric Cave Art in Southeast North America. In, Discovering North American Rock Art, edited by L. Loendorf, C. Chippendale, and D. Whitley, Tucson, AZ: The University of Arizona Press, pp. 93–113.
- 2004. J. F. Simek, A. Cressler, and E. Pope. Association Between A Southeastern Rock Art Motif and Mortuary Caves. In, The Rock-Art of Eastern North America: Capturing Images and Insight, edited by C. Diaz-Granados and J. R. Duncan, Tuscaloosa, AL: The University of Alabama Press, pp. 159–173.
- 2004. C. H. Faulkner, J. F. Simek, and A. Cressler. On the Edges of the World: Prehistoric Open Air Rock Art in Tennessee. In, The Rock-Art of Eastern North America: Capturing Images and Insight, edited by C. Diaz-Granados and J. R. Duncan, Tuscaloosa, AL: The University of Alabama Press, pp. 77–89.
- 2004. G. Lucas, M. Soressi, J-Ph. Rigaud, and J. F. Simek. The Chatelperronian of the Grotte XVI and the Middle/Upper Paleolithic "Transition" in southern France. In, The Chronology of the Aurignacian and of the Transitional Technocomplexes: Dating, Stratigraphies, Cultural Implications, edited by J. Zilhao and F. d'Errico. Trabalhos de Arqueologia 33. Lisbon, Portugal: Instituto Português de Arqueologia, pp. 289–298.
- 2001. K. Panagiotis, J-Ph. Rigaud, J.F. Simek, Albert, R.M., and S. Weiner. Ash, Bones, and Guano: a Study of the Minerals and Phytoliths in the Sediments of Grotte XVI, Dordogne, France. Journal of Archaeological Science 29: 721-732.
- 1998. Simek, Jan F., Jay D. Franklin, and Sarah C. Sherwood. “The Context of Early Southeastern Prehistoric Cave Art: A Report on the Archaeology of 3rd Unnamed Cave”. American Antiquity 63: 663-677.

=== Books and edited volumes ===
- 2001 S. C. Sherwood and J. F. Simek (editors). Cave Archaeology in the Eastern Woodlands. Special issue of the Midcontinental Journal of Archaeology 26(2).
- 1984 J. Simek. A K-means Approach to the Analysis of Spatial Structure in Upper Paleolithic Habitation Sites: Le Flageolet I and Pincevent Section 36. British Archaeological Reports International Series #S205. Oxford: B.A.R.
