= Emerson H. Fly =

American academic (1935-2017)

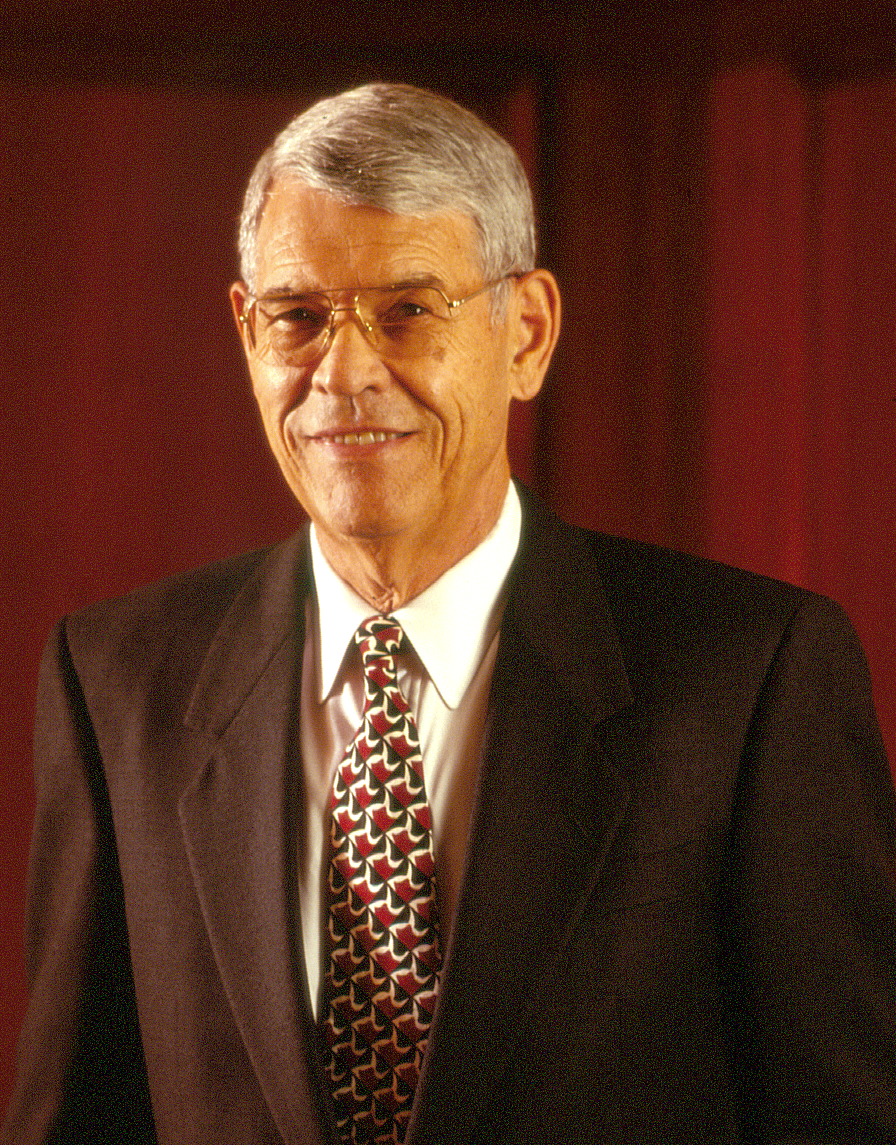

5th President of the University of Tennessee system
- In office 2001–2002
- Preceded by: J. Wade Gilley
- Succeeded by: John W. Shumaker

Personal details
- Born: February 5, 1935 Milan, Tennessee, U.S.
- Died: August 8, 2017 (aged 82) Knoxville, Tennessee, U.S.
- Education: University of Tennessee
- Occupation: Certified Public Accountant, auditor

Emerson Harold "Eli" Fly (February 5, 1935 – August 8, 2017) was an American academic. He served as the president of University of Tennessee system from 2001 to 2002. He is an alumnus of the University of Tennessee (UT), having earned a degree in accounting.

Born in Milan, Tennessee, Fly became a Certified Public Accountant after college. From 1961 to 1962, he was a junior accountant for Price Waterhouse before returning to UT as an assistant auditor. He became the internal auditor in 1968 and vice chancellor for finance at UT Chattanooga in 1973. He was named UT vice president for business and finance in 1977 and became system executive vice president in 1991.

In 2001, Fly was named UT's acting president, which its board of trustees later designated as permanent. He retired in 2002, only to be asked to return as interim executive vice president and chief financial officer in 2003. He retired again in 2004.

After two years at UT Martin, Fly entered the US Navy as an aviation cadet. Upon completion of pilot training, he received his wings and was commissioned as an ensign. Fly was initially assigned as an instructor pilot and later was a U.S. Navy fighter pilot aboard the USS Intrepid. After leaving active duty he joined the Naval Air Reserves and completed his undergraduate degree at UT Knoxville on the GI Bill. Fly retired from the reserves at the rank of commander. He died on August 8, 2017, aged 82, after a lengthy battle with Parkinson's disease and is survived by his wife Catherine and their four children.
