= J. Wade Gilley =

American academic (1938–2025)

4th President of the University of Tennessee system
- In office 1999–2001
- Preceded by: Joe Johnson
- Succeeded by: Emerson H. Fly

President of Marshall University
- In office August 1, 1991 – July 31, 1999
- Preceded by: Dale F. Nitzschke
- Succeeded by: A. Michael Perry

3rd Virginia Secretary of Education
- In office January 14, 1978 – January 16, 1982
- Governor: John N. Dalton
- Preceded by: Robert R. Ramsey
- Succeeded by: John T. Casteen III

Personal details
- Born: James Wade Gilley; August 15, 1938 Fries, Virginia, U.S.
- Died: July 5, 2025 (aged 86)
- Party: Republican
- Spouse: Nanna Beverly
- Children: 3
- Education: Virginia Tech (B.S., M.S., Ph.D.); Harvard Graduate School of Business Administration
- Occupation: Engineer

James Wade Gilley (August 15, 1938 – July 5, 2025) was an American academic. He served as the president of University of Tennessee system from 1999 to 2001. Gilley also was president of Marshall University from 1991 to 1999. He attended Virginia Tech where he earned B.S., M.S., and Ph.D. degrees in engineering. Gilley also taught at Virginia Tech, Bluefield State College, George Mason University, and Marshall University. From 1977 to 1982, he served as Virginia Secretary of Education.

Gilley died on July 5, 2025, at the age of 86.

== See also ==
- List of presidents and principals of Marshall University
