= Loren Crabtree =

American academic

Chancellor of the University of Tennessee
- In office 2003–2008
- Preceded by: William T. Snyder
- Succeeded by: Jan Simek

Personal details
- Born: September 2, 1940 (age 85) Aberdeen, South Dakota, U.S.
- Education: University of Minnesota (BA, MA, PhD)

Loren William Crabtree (born September 2, 1940) is an American academic. He was the chancellor of the University of Tennessee Knoxville from 2003 to 2008. A historian, he earned his B.A., M.A., and Ph.D. degrees from the University of Minnesota.
