= Joseph E. Johnson (academic) =

American academic (1933–2023)

Joe Johnson

3rd President of the University of Tennessee system
- In office 1991–1999
- Preceded by: Lamar Alexander
- Succeeded by: J. Wade Gilley

Personal details
- Born: Joseph Edwin Johnson; July 9, 1933; Vernon, Alabama, U.S.
- Died: September 29, 2023 (aged 90)

Joseph Edwin Johnson (July 9, 1933 – September 29, 2023) was an American academic. He served as the president of University of Tennessee system from 1991 to 1999. He was an alumnus of Birmingham–Southern College and the University of Tennessee. He was also a 1951 graduate of Hueytown High School in Hueytown, Alabama, where his fellow high school seniors accurately voted him "most likely to succeed." Johnson died on September 29, 2023, at the age of 90.
