= William T. Snyder =

American academic administrator (1931–2025)

Chancellor of the University of Tennessee
- In office 1992–1999
- Preceded by: John Quinn
- Succeeded by: Loren Crabtree

Personal details
- Born: October 18, 1931 Knoxville, Tennessee, U.S.
- Died: September 23, 2025 (aged 93)
- Spouse: Margaret Snyder (m. 1956)
- Education: University of Tennessee Knoxville; Northwestern University
- Occupation: Engineer

William T. Snyder (October 18, 1931 – September 23, 2025) was an American academic. He was the chancellor of the University of Tennessee Knoxville from 1992 to 1999. He was a former Department Head of Engineering and Mechanics and Dean of the College. Snyder also performed at the Tennessee Theatre as the House Organist between 1979 and 2018. He died on September 23, 2025, at the age of 93.
