= Edward J. Boling =

American academic

1st President of the University of Tennessee system
- In office 1970–1988
- Succeeded by: Lamar Alexander

Personal details
- Born: February 19, 1922; Sevier County, Tennessee, United States
- Died: June 18, 2015 (aged 93); East Knoxville, Tennessee, United States

Edward Joseph Boling (February 19, 1922 – June 18, 2015) was an American academic. He served as the first president of University of Tennessee system from 1970 to 1988.

Thompson-Boling Arena, the arena used by the Vols and Lady Vols at the University of Tennessee-Knoxville, is partly named after him. The Edward J. and Carolyn P. Boling University Center at the University of Tennessee at Martin is also named in his honor.
