= Joseph A. DiPietro =

American academic administrator

Joe DiPietro

8th President of the University of Tennessee system
- In office January 1, 2011 – November 22, 2018
- Preceded by: Jan Simek (interim)
- Succeeded by: Randy Boyd (interim)

Personal details
- Born: Joseph Anthony DiPietro; July 19, 1951 (age 74) Steubenville, Ohio, U.S.
- Spouse: Deborah Sue Brown
- Education: University of Illinois at Urbana–Champaign (BS, DVM, MS)

Joseph Anthony DiPietro (born July 19, 1951) is the former president of the University of Tennessee system, who served from 2011 to 2018.

== Early life and education ==
DiPietro was born in Steubenville, Ohio to Alphonso and Luisa DiPietro. He graduated from the University of Illinois at Urbana–Champaign in 1974 and later received a Doctor of Veterinary Medicine degree from UIUC College of Veterinary Medicine in 1976 and a master's degree in 1980.

== Career ==
In 2010, after the resignation of John D. Petersen, DiPietro was chosen to be the 25th president of the University of Tennessee and 8th president of the University of Tennessee system.
