= UT System =

UT System may refer to either of two state university systems:

- University of Tennessee system
- University of Texas System
