= Beverly J. Davenport =

American academic

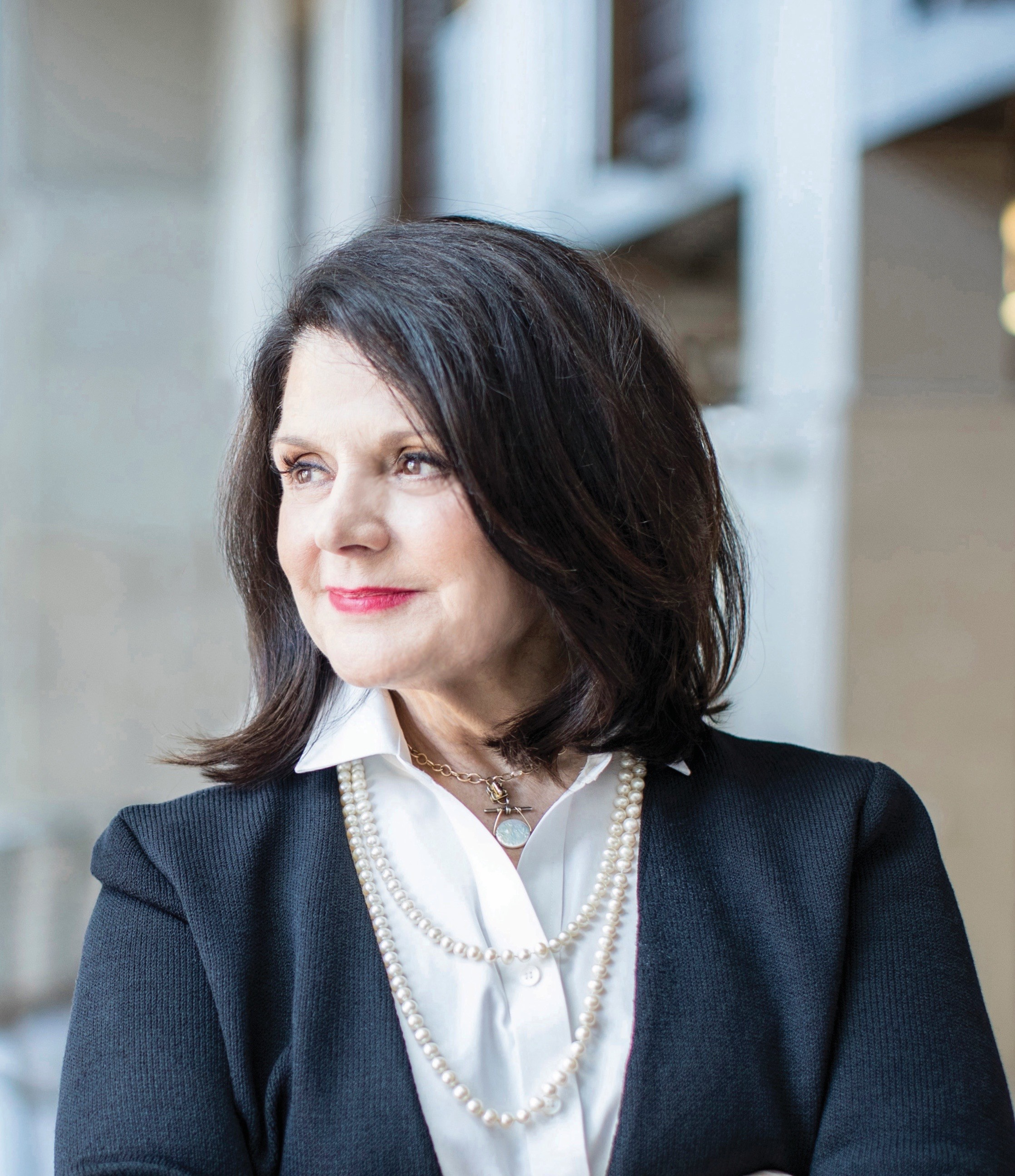
- Davenport in 2023

8th Chancellor of University of Tennessee, Knoxville
- In office February 15, 2017 – May 2, 2018
- Preceded by: Jimmy Cheek
- Succeeded by: Wayne Davis (interim)

Beverly Davenport is an American academic. She served as the 8th chancellor of the University of Tennessee, Knoxville, from February 2017 to May 2018. She previously served as provost of the University of Cincinnati from 2013 to 2016.

== Career ==
Davenport began her career at the Western Kentucky University where she was tenured and led a departmental internship program. She spent eight years at the University of Kansas, where she served as divisional dean for the social sciences, was promoted to full professor and named a Kemper Fellow for Teaching Excellence.

Davenport left Kansas to become the associate provost for Special Initiatives at Purdue University, where she spent 11 years and subsequently served as vice provost for faculty affairs, as director of the Susan Butler Bulkeley Center for Women's Leadership, as director of the Discovery Learning Center, and was recognized for her contributions to gender equity in education in the 40 years of Title IX at Purdue University.

Davenport served as provost and chief academic officer at the University of Cincinnati in Ohio from 2013 to 2016. She then served in an interim capacity as the president of the University of Cincinnati following the departure of Santa Ono.

Davenport began serving as the 8th chancellor of the University of Tennessee, Knoxville, on February 15, 2017. Davenport was the first woman to lead UT Knoxville and the second woman chancellor in UT System history. She succeeded chancellor Jimmy G. Cheek, who led the flagship campus since February 2009. At the time, she was the only woman to head an SEC school. In 2017, she was one of only 40 women presidents of some 4000 US college campuses, according to the Chronicle of Higher Education. Davenport was fired on May 2, 2018, by University of Tennessee president Joe DiPietro, who cited her "unsatisfactory performance".

Davenport served with the Gilda's Club of Middle Tennessee and on the Board of Directors of the Tennessee Innocence Project.

== Selected publications ==
- Destructive Organizational Communication: Processes, Consequences, and Constructive Ways of Organizing (co-edited with Pamela Lutgen-Sandvik, Routledge, 2009)
- Case Studies in Organizational Communication 2: Perspectives on Contemporary Work Life (Guilford Press, 1997)
- Case Studies in Organizational Communication (Guilford Press, 1990)
