= John D. Petersen =

American chemist, educator and academic administrator (1947–2025)

7th President of the University of Tennessee system
- In office July 1, 2004 – June 30, 2009
- Preceded by: John W. Shumaker
- Succeeded by: Jan Simek (interim)

Personal details
- Born: November 21, 1947 Los Angeles, California, U.S.
- Died: September 11, 2025 (aged 77) Chapel Hill, North Carolina, U.S.
- Spouse: Carol Petersen
- Children: 2
- Education: California State University, Los Angeles (B.S. 1970); University of California, Santa Barbara (Ph.D. 1975)
- Salary: $410,177 (as of 2009)

John David Petersen (November 21, 1947 – September 11, 2025) was an American chemist, educator and academic administrator who was president of the University of Tennessee system.

== Early life and education ==
Petersen was born in Los Angeles, California, on November 21, 1947. He attended California State University, Los Angeles, where he received a B.S. degree in chemistry in 1970. In 1975 he received a Ph.D. in inorganic chemistry from the University of California, Santa Barbara, where his dissertation was entitled Photochemical and Photophysical Studies of Rhodium(III) Ammine Complexes.

== Early career ==
After completing his Ph.D., Petersen took a position as assistant professor of chemistry at Kansas State University. In 1980, he joined the faculty of Clemson University, where he was associate dean for research for the College of Sciences and head of the chemistry department. In 1986-87, he spent a year at Universität Regensburg in Germany as Alexander von Humboldt research fellow and guest professor. In 1994, he went on to Wayne State University, where he was dean of the College of Science and professor of chemistry. During his career as a university researcher, from 1980 to 1995, he participated in the U.S. Department of Energy Solar Photochemistry Program. He was credited with over 70 publications and 200 presentations.

In 2000, he joined the University of Connecticut as provost and executive vice president for academic affairs. In 2004 he was appointed president of the University of Tennessee, and started in that role in July 2004.

== University of Tennessee system President ==
At the University of Tennessee, Petersen was credited with increasing research activity, expanding the university's partnership with Oak Ridge National Laboratory, and receiving a record amount of state government appropriations for campus buildings. During his presidency, the university received its largest research grant ever, $65 million for construction of what was called "the world’s fastest unclassified supercomputer." His presidency also saw the start of a $70 million statewide Biofuels Initiative. However, there was chronic tension with the university faculty and he was criticized for forcing the chancellor of the University's Knoxville campus to resign. In a 2008 survey of the faculty, 34% indicated "no confidence" in his ability to lead the university and an additional 37% expressed only "limited confidence."

Petersen's total compensation at Tennessee was reported to be $456,027 as of 2008, including a salary of $420,971. He ranked 80th in total compensation among the top leaders of U.S. public universities.

Petersen announced his departure from the University of Tennessee presidency in February 2009, taking administrative leave beginning March 1 of that year and resigning effective June 30. Jan Simek became interim president.

== Post-Tennessee career ==
After leaving the University of Tennessee in 2009, Petersen was a consultant. He also served as executive director of the RTP Solar Fuels Project of the Research Technology Energy Consortium, a consortium of Duke University, North Carolina State University, Research Triangle Institute and the University of North Carolina-Chapel Hill that seeks to use solar energy to create liquid fuels. On August 1, 2012, he became the Executive Director of the International Union of Pure and Applied Chemistry (IUPAC).

== Personal life and death ==
John Petersen was married to Carol Petersen, a former middle school teacher. The couple had two children. At Tennessee, Carol Petersen became the subject of public criticism in 2008 after it was reported that she had verbally attacked a major university donor who was attending an activity at the university president's residence in Knoxville. That incident resulted in her being prohibited from interacting with university donors or staff members. The prohibition was lifted after her husband gave the university a written promise that in the future her only activities on behalf of the university would be conducted in a volunteer capacity, and that she would have no authority over anyone else.

Petersen died at his home in Chapel Hill, North Carolina, on September 11, 2025, at the age of 77.
