= Baker School of Public Policy and Public Affairs =

Public policy school in Knoxville, Tennessee, United States

Coordinates: 35.956375°N 83.931653°W

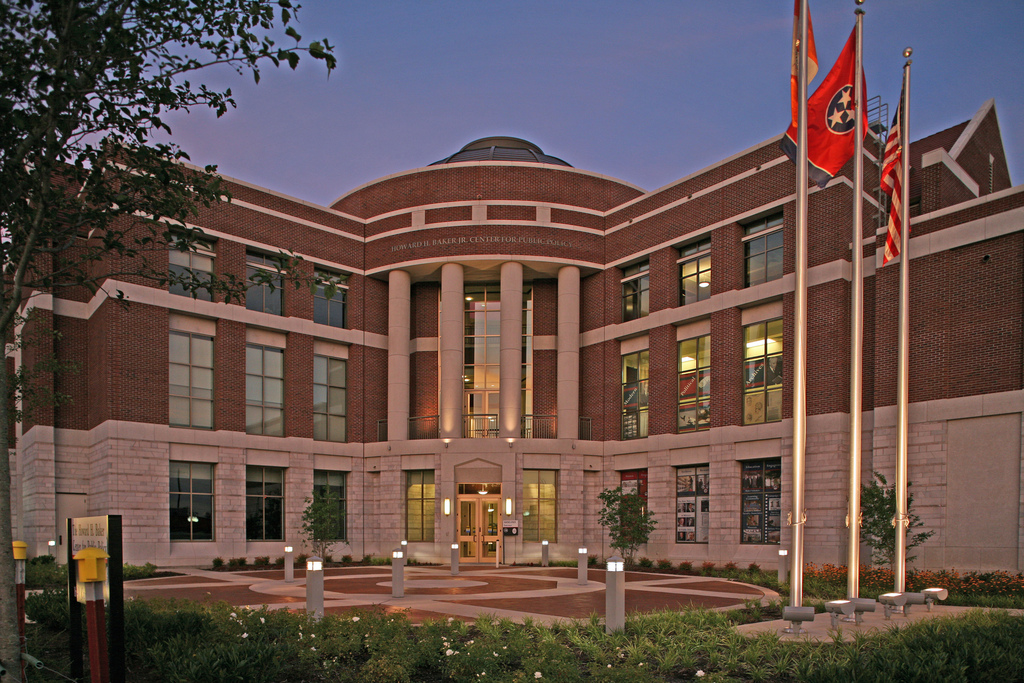
- Howard H. Baker School of Public Policy and Public Affairs
- Type: Public policy school
- Established: 2001
- Parent institution: University of Tennessee
- Location: Knoxville, Tennessee, United States
- Website: baker.utk.edu

The Baker School of Public Policy and Public Affairs is the public policy school and a college at the University of Tennessee. The school aims to provide policy makers, citizens, scholars, and students with the information and skills necessary to work effectively within the political system and to serve local, state, national, and global communities.

The Baker School is named for Senator Howard H. Baker Jr., who was nicknamed "The Great Conciliator" for his bipartisanship.

== History ==
In 2001, the University of Tennessee received a congressionally authorized Fund for the Improvement of Postsecondary Education (FIPSE) grant to create the school and begin its programming and operations. The school sought to follow Howard Baker Jr.'s bipartisan line of reasoning in all of their research and programming.

The Baker School was originally located in Hoskins Library, but moved to the newly constructed Howard H. Baker Jr. School for Public Policy in 2008. The facility is located on the corner of Melrose and Cumberland and opened to the public on October 31, 2008. It featured more than 51,000 square feet of space that included an auditorium and rotunda for public events, classrooms, archives storage and research areas, an interactive museum, a boardroom, an office for Senator Baker, and the administrative spaces necessary for the Baker School's operations. As a part of the dedication ceremony, The Honorable Sandra Day O'Connor spoke along with Howard Baker Jr., and other notable Tennesseans.

On July 1, 2023, the Howard H. Baker Jr. School for Public Policy became the Howard H. Baker Jr. School of Public Policy and Public Affairs and a college of UT.

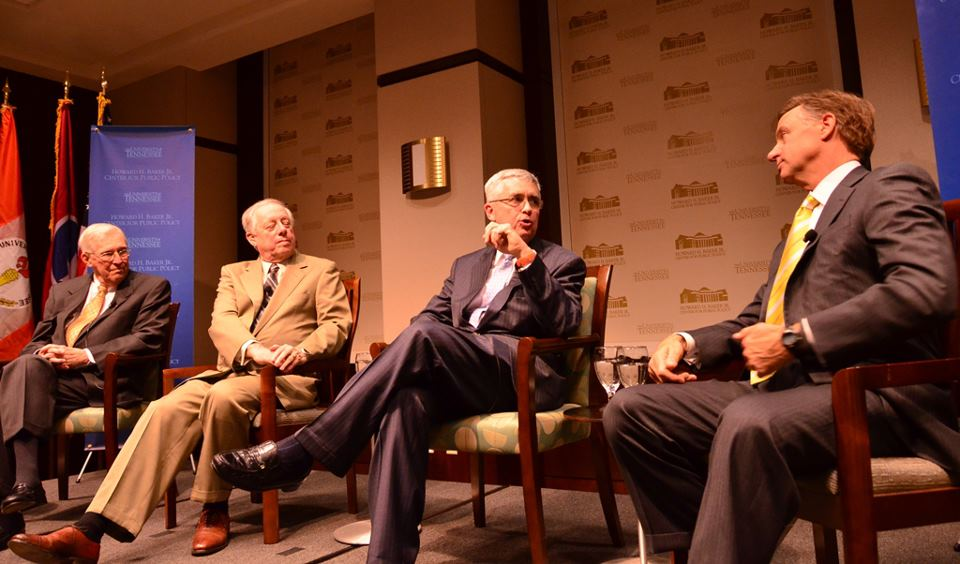
Governors Haslam, Bredesen and Sundquist, along with moderator, Bill Haltom discussing civility in politics during a 2013 lecture.

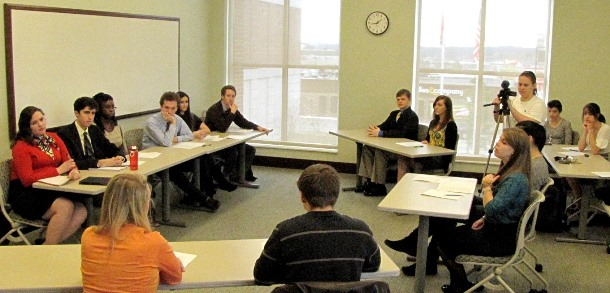
Howard H. Baker Jr. School for Public Policy Student Panel Discussion
