= Randy Boyd (university president) =

American academic administrator

President of the University of Tennessee system
- Incumbent
- Assumed office November 22, 2018; Interim: November 22, 2018 - March 27, 2020
- Preceded by: Joseph A. DiPietro

Personal details
- Born: October 24, 1959 (age 66) Knoxville, Tennessee, U.S.
- Party: Republican
- Education: University of Tennessee, Knoxville (BA); University of Oklahoma (MA)

Randy Boyd is an American entrepreneur and academic administrator, currently serving as the President of the University of Tennessee (UT) System.

== Life ==
Boyd was born on October 24, 1959, in Knoxville, Tennessee.

Boyd earned his bachelor's degree in Industrial Management from the University of Tennessee, Knoxville.

In 1991, Boyd founded Radio Systems Corporation, a company that designs and manufactures pet products under various brand names, including PetSafe, Invisible Fence, and SportDOG. Boyd sold Radio Systems Corporation to private investment firm Clayton, Dubilier, & Rice in 2020.

In 2015, Boyd was appointed commissioner of the Tennessee Department of Economic and Community Development by Tennessee Governor Bill Haslam.

Randy Boyd ran for governor of Tennessee in 2018, and faced a crowded field in the Republican primary that included Bill Lee, Diane Black, and Beth Harwell, and perennial candidate Basil Marceaux. Boyd finished second behind Bill Lee who went on to become the 50th governor of Tennessee.

Boyd purchased the Tennessee Smokies, a minor league baseball team in 2013. The team moved to Knoxville in 2025 upon completion of a new stadium.

Boyd is also known for his philanthropic efforts. He and his wife, Jenny, have contributed to various causes, particularly in education and animal welfare. The couple established the Boyd Foundation, which supports numerous charitable initiatives, including the creation of greenways and public parks.

The University of Tennessee Board of Trustees hired Boyd as interim president of the statewide university system in 2018. He was named permanent president of the university on March 27, 2020. Boyd's contract with the University of Tennessee system was extended to 2030 on June 27, 2024.
