= C. E. Brehm =

President of the University of Tennessee

Cloide Everett Brehm (March 23, 1889 – July 25, 1971) was the 15th president of the University of Tennessee, serving in that position from 1946 until his retirement in 1959. He was born in Newville, Pennsylvania and died in Knoxville, Tennessee.
