= Jimmy Cheek =

Chancellor of the University of Tennessee

Jimmy G. Cheek

7th Chancellor of the University of Tennessee, Knoxville
- In office February 1, 2009 – February 14, 2017
- Succeeded by: Beverly J. Davenport

Senior Vice President for Agriculture and Natural Resources at the University of Florida
- In office January, 2005 – January, 2009

Personal details
- Born: September 7, 1946 (age 80) Gorman, Texas
- Spouse: Ileen Cheek
- Children: 2
- Education: Texas A&M University (BS, PhD); Lamar University (MS)

Jimmy G. Cheek is a former academic administrator. He served as senior vice president for agriculture and natural resources at the University of Florida from 2005 to 2009 and as the 7th chancellor of the University of Tennessee, Knoxville from February 2009, to February 2017. After leaving the chancellor's office, he joined the Knoxville's faculty at the Department of Educational Leadership and Policy Studies and retired from the university in November 2022.

== Education ==
Cheek holds a Ph.D. in Interdisciplinary Education and a bachelor's degree with high honors in Agricultural Education from Texas A&M University. He received his master's degree in Guidance and Counseling from Lamar University.

== Career ==
=== University of Florida ===
Cheek was hired at the University of Florida in 1975 as an assistant professor of agricultural education and communication and became professor in 1985. In 1981, he was appointed assistant department chair and served in that role until 1992.

From 1999 to 2005, Cheek served as dean of the University of Florida's College of Agricultural and Life Sciences, where he led the creation of new academic programs, increased student enrollment, and enhanced research and teaching initiatives. Under his leadership, the college had $55 million in new funding, including recurring, non-recurring, and endowment resources.

Cheek became assistant dean for the College of Agricultural and Life Sciences in 1992 and served for seven years before becoming dean. During his tenure, the college's undergraduate enrollment rose by 120%, degrees conferred doubled, and the early admissions program and an off-campus initiative were launched.

From 2005 to 2009, Cheek served as senior vice president for agriculture and natural resources at the University of Florida, overseeing the Institute of Food and Agricultural Sciences (IFAS). During his tenure, IFAS had growth in funding, such as a $20 million cellulosic ethanol plant and the $100 million Emerging Pathogens Institute, while grant expenditures rose 30% and private fundraising increased 76%.

=== University of Tennessee, Knoxville ===
During his time as the 7th chancellor of the University of Tennessee, Knoxville, the university invested more than $1 billion in new facilities, increased enrollment and retention, opened several research centers, named the colleges of business and engineering, and was designated a Carnegie Engaged University.

Major accomplishments include approval by the Board of Trustees of differential tuition for 4 colleges, the 15-4 tuition model where full-time undergraduates pay for 15 credit hours each semester, and approval of a transformational campus infrastructure and landscaping plan. In 2012 the campus launched a private fund-raising campaign, Join the Journey, with a goal to raise $1.1 billion by 2020 and raised about $1.3 billion.

== Awards and recognitions ==
The Board of Trustees of the University of Tennessee System honored him for his work as Chancellor with a resolution commending him for his outstanding service to the board, university, and state. He received the Leadership and Service Award from the Alumni Board of Directors, a Faculty Senate Resolution honoring his significant and lasting contributions, a Thomas Jefferson Cup for his support and dedication from the Chancellor's Associates, and the Student Government Association created the Jimmy G. Cheek Visionary Award to annually recognize a visionary student leader.

Dr. Cheek has received Outstanding Alumni Awards from the College of Agriculture and Life Sciences and the College of Education and Human Development from Texas A&M University. Tarleton State University awarded him the President's Legacy Award for Excellence Through Leadership.

While at the University of Florida, Cheek received the President's Medallion and Student Body Resolution 2009-104 for dedicated and loyal service to the university and outstanding service to students, respectively, and the Morton Wolfson Faculty Award for outstanding contributions to the quality of student life. Cheek was named to the Academy of Teaching Excellence in 2008 at the University of Florida, a Fellow of the American Association for Agricultural Education in 2005, and a Fellow of the North American Colleges and Teachers of Agriculture in 1998.

== Professional service ==
Cheek served on the United Way Tocqueville Cabinet, the Greater Knoxville Board of Directors, and was the United Way of Greater Knoxville Campaign Chair in 2018. He was a member of the Delaware Valley University Board of Trustees and past chair of the board of directors for the International Fertilizer Development Center (IFDC). Cheek was the chair of the Commission on Food, Environment and Renewable Resources, a member of its Energy Forum, a board member of the Association of Public and Land Grant Universities, and currently a commission member of the Association of Public and Land Grant Universities Food Systems Leadership Institute.

While Chancellor, Cheek served on the UT-Battelle Board of Governors for Oak Ridge National Laboratory, the board of directors for United Health System, the Pat Summit Foundation, the Southeastern Conference (SEC) Board of Directors, the SEC Executive Committee and chaired the Leadership Knoxville Board of Directors.

== Personal life ==
Cheek is a native of Texas and is married to Ileen Cheek, and they have two children and four grandchildren.

== Publications ==
- Cheek, J. G., & Arrington, L. R. (2011). Reshaping SAE to provide experiential learning in the 1990s. The Agricultural Education Magazine, 83(4), 5–8.
- Cheek, J. G. (2008). Ag Fuels Florida's Future. Florida Grower, 101(4), 34.
- Cheek, J. G. (2006). Safeguarding the future of Florida's citrus industry. Florida Grower, 22, 24.
- Darnell, R., & Cheek, J. (2005). Plant science graduate students: Demographics, research areas, and recruitment issues. HortScience, 40(4), 1138B-1138.
- Martin, M. V., & Cheek, J. G. (2004). Off-campus degree programs: lessons from Florida's experience. NACTA journal, 42–45.
- Connor, L. J., & Cheek, J. G. (2002). Effective utilization of faculty task forces for problem solving. NACTA Journal, 27–32.
- Achey, P. M., & Cheek, J. G. (1999). Alternative Approaches to Computerized Monitoring of Student Progress. NACTA journal, 24-28
- Comer, D. A., Cheek, J. G., & Connor, L. J. (1996). A case study of undergraduate curricular reform in a college of agriculture. NACTA Journal, 40(3), 4–13.
- Cheek, J. G., Arrington, L. R., & McGhee, M. B. (1995). Effective oral communication. Interstate Publishers.
- Cheek, J. G., Arrington, L. R., Carter, S., & Randell, R. S. (1994). Relationship of supervised agricultural experience program participation and student achievement in agricultural education. Journal of agricultural education, 35(2), 1–5.
- Arrington, L. R., & Cheek, J. G. (1990). SAE Scope and Student Achievement in Agribusiness and Natural Resources Education. Journal of Agricultural Education, 31(2), 55–61.
- Cheek, J. (1988). Maintaining Momentum in Vocational Education Research. Journal of Vocational Education Research, 13(1), 1–17.
- Cheek, J. G. (1983). Predicting Whether or Not Agricultural Education Graduates Will Teach. Journal of Vocational Education Research, 8(4), 49–60.
- Cheek, J. G., & Christiansen, J. E. (1977). Perceptions regarding the role of the vocational counselor. The Journal of Educational Research, 70(5), 281–285.
