= University of Tennessee system =

Public university system in the U.S. state of Tennessee

University of Tennessee
- Type: Public university system
- Established: 1968
- Endowment: US$1 billion
- President: Randy Boyd
- Faculty: 2,250
- Administrative staff: 6,950
- Students: 62,148 (fall 2024)
- Undergraduates: 48,979 (fall 2024)
- Postgraduates: 13,196 (fall 2024)
- Location: Knoxville, Tennessee, United States
- Campus: Five campuses
- Website: www.tennessee.edu

University of Tennessee system locations.

The University of Tennessee System (UT System) is a system of public universities in the U.S. state of Tennessee. It is one of two public university systems, the other being the Tennessee Board of Regents (TBR). It consists of four primary campuses in Knoxville, Chattanooga, Pulaski and Martin; a health sciences campus in Memphis; a research institute in Tullahoma; and various extensions throughout the state.

As of 2012, the UT System has a combined student enrollment of more than 49,000 students, over 320,000 living alumni, and a total endowment that tops $1 billion.

== History ==
The University of Tennessee was founded in Knoxville as Blount College in 1794. It became East Tennessee College in 1807, and gained university status in 1840. It was designated as the state's land-grant institution in 1869, and was renamed the "University of Tennessee" in 1879.

The medical campus, the UT Health Science Center, was founded in Memphis in 1911. An adult education extension center was founded in Nashville in 1947.

In 1927, UT founded the University of Tennessee Junior College, and bought the campus of the defunct Hall-Moody Institute, a Baptist institution in the northwest Tennessee town of Martin, to use for the new college. In 1951, the school began awarding bachelor's degrees and became the University of Tennessee Martin Branch. In 1967, the campus was elevated to an autonomous four-year institution under the name of the University of Tennessee at Martin.

In 1968, the UT System was officially formed, with the Knoxville and Martin campuses as primary campuses. That same year, the Tennessee state legislature gave UT permission to establish a campus in Chattanooga, which was the largest city in Tennessee without a public university. The private University of Chattanooga determined that it could not raise enough private capital to compete with a public institution, and agreed to merge with another private school, Chattanooga City College, to form the University of Tennessee at Chattanooga in 1969.

Also in 1968, UT announced plans to expand the Nashville extension center into a full-fledged University of Tennessee at Nashville. Rita Sanders Geier filed a desegregation lawsuit against the state. Geier contended that if UT were allowed to build a campus in Nashville, where Tennessee State University was located, it would perpetuate a dual system of higher education. As a result, the UT Nashville campus was eventually merged with TSU by court order in 1979.

On December 9, 2020, UT's board of trustees unanimously voted in favor of integrating Martin Methodist College into the UT System as UT Southern. This merger is aimed at providing higher education to the residents of rural southern Middle Tennessee. On June 27, 2021 The Tennessean reported that MMC had been fully accepted as a system campus, with the tuition to be adjusted accordingly.

== Campuses ==
There are six educational units of the university system, four of which are separate universities within this statewide higher education system.

=== University of Tennessee, Knoxville (UT) ===
UT Knoxville is the flagship campus of the UT System, based in Knoxville. The largest university in the state, it has a current total enrollment of 27,523. UT awarded 6,345 degrees in over 300 programs in the 2009–10 academic year. Their athletic program is part of the SEC of the NCAA Division I.

While not a separate entity, UT Knoxville operates a campus in Nashville that is part of the UT Knoxville College of Social Work. The Nashville Campus awards the M.S.S.W. in conjunction with UT Knoxville.

=== University of Tennessee at Chattanooga (UTC) ===
UTC is a large university located in downtown Chattanooga. The university was founded as a private school in 1886, joined the UT System in 1969, and currently has over 10,000 students. Their athletic program is part of the SoCon of the NCAA Division I.

=== University of Tennessee at Martin (UTM) ===
Located in rural northwest Tennessee in Martin, UT Martin began in 1900 as Hall-Moody Institute, a private Baptist school. In 1927, the Tennessee Baptist Convention merged Hall-Moody Institute with Union University. The University of Tennessee System took over the former Hall-Moody campus and the school became known as The University of Tennessee Junior College in Martin. It operated under this name until 1951 when four-year fields of study leading to bachelor's degrees were added. The name was then changed to The University of Tennessee Martin Branch. In 1967, it was designated a primary campus in the UT system and was given its current name, The University of Tennessee at Martin. With approximately 8,000 students, UT Martin comprises the main campus in Martin and four extended campuses located in Parsons, Selmer, Jackson, and Ripley. Their athletic program is part of the Ohio Valley Conference of the NCAA Division I.

=== University of Tennessee Southern (UTS) ===
As a consequence of a planned meeting between then-Acting System President Randy Boyd (later named the system's permanent head) and Martin Methodist College President Mark La Branche in 2020 about the plans for UT to open an Agricultural Extension Office in MMC's hometown of Pulaski, a wider-ranging discussion ensued about the low level of affordable higher educational opportunities in Southern Middle Tennessee. MMC was founded as a women's college in 1870, but became co-educational in the 1930s. In December 2020, The University of Tennessee Board of Trustees voted to accept MMC as a primary campus of the University of Tennessee System. On June 27, 2021 The Tennessean reported that the merger had been consummated, with La Branche to serve as the first chancellor of the campus as a unit of the UT system designated the University of Tennessee Southern. Their athletic program is part of the Southern States Athletic Conference of the NAIA.

UT system primary campuses
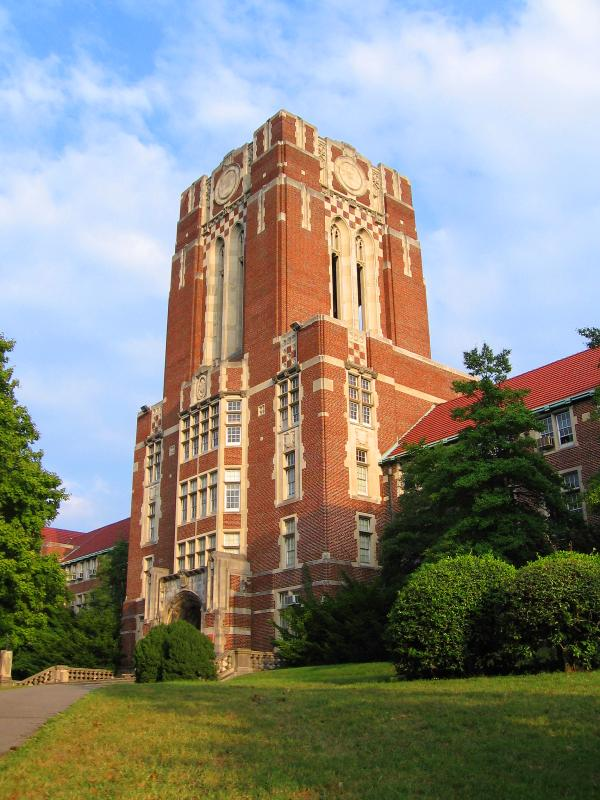
Knoxville

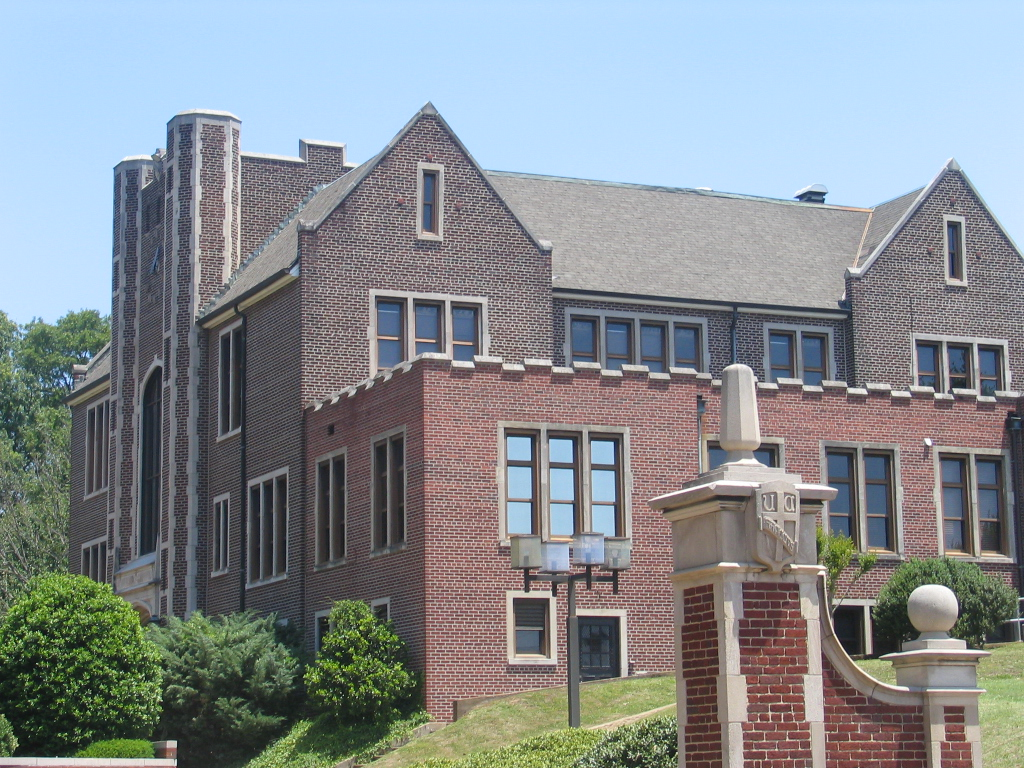
Chattanooga

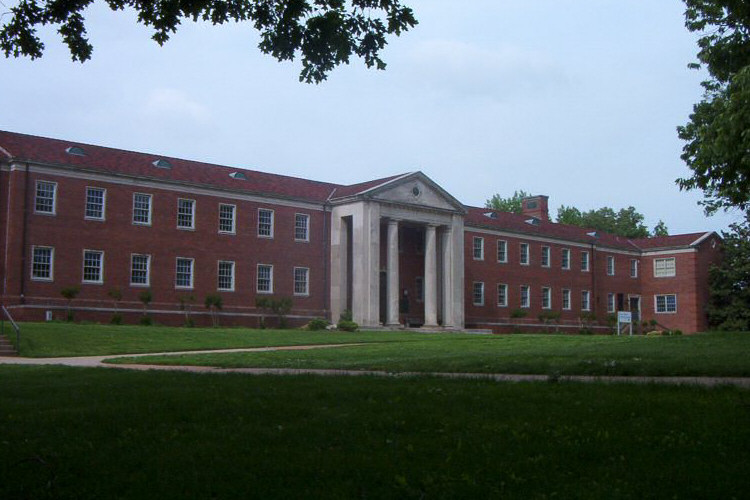
Martin

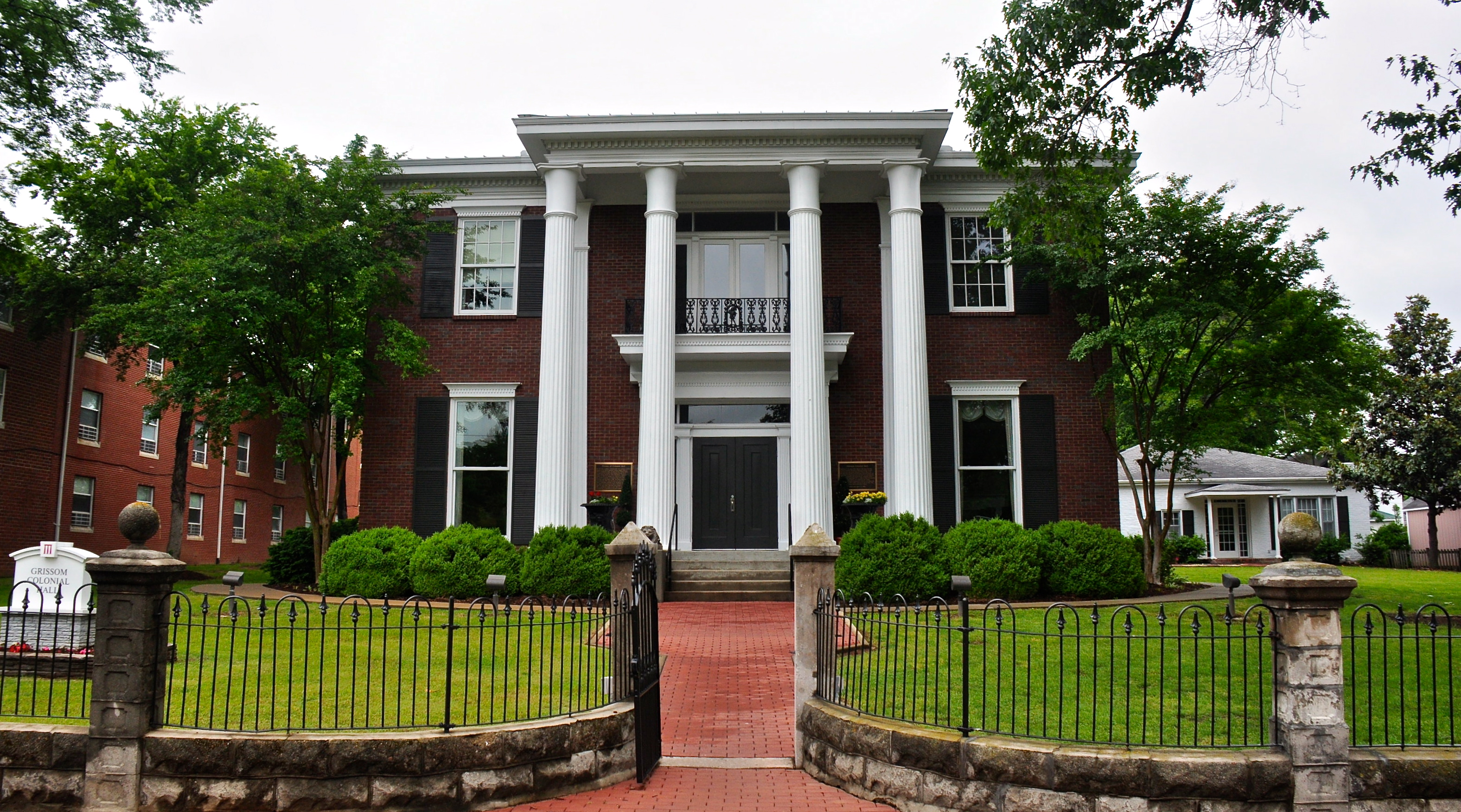
Southern

=== University of Tennessee Health Science Center (UTHSC) ===
The University of Tennessee Health Science Center (UTHSC) has its main campus in Memphis. UTHSC offers a wide variety of degree programs among its six colleges: Dentistry, Graduate Health Sciences, Health Professions, Medicine, Nursing, and Pharmacy. In addition to Memphis, the College of Medicine also has campuses in Chattanooga, Knoxville and Nashville; the College of Pharmacy has campuses in Knoxville and Nashville; and the College of Health Professions has a unit in Knoxville. UTHSC has more than 100 additional clinical and educational sites statewide.

=== University of Tennessee Space Institute (UTSI) ===
The University of Tennessee Space Institute is located in Tullahoma adjacent to Arnold Air Force Base, long a center of research for the United States Air Force. The Institute awards master's and doctoral degrees in conjunction with UT Knoxville.

== Other units ==
The University of Tennessee system has several other units that provide service to the state of Tennessee and to the nation.

=== University of Tennessee Institute of Agriculture ===
The Institute of Agriculture is composed of the Agricultural Experiment Station, UT Extension, and Knoxville's Herbert College of Agriculture and College of Veterinary Medicine. The institute has a presence in all 95 counties through its educational programs in agriculture, home economics, resource development, and 4-H programs.

=== University of Tennessee Institute of Public Service ===
The Institute for Public Service was created in 1971 as a part of the university "to provide continuing research and technical assistance to state and local government and industry and to meet more adequately the need for information and research in business and government." Components include the County Technical Assistance Service, the Municipal Technical Advisory Service, the Center for Industrial Services, the Center for Local Planning, the Law Enforcement Innovation Center, the Naifeh Center for Effective Leadership, the Tennessee Language Center and the SMART Initiative.

=== UT-ORNL partnership ===
UT Knoxville and Battelle Memorial Institute are 50–50 partners in UT-Battelle, which manages the Oak Ridge National Laboratory for the United States Department of Energy.

== Governance ==
The University of Tennessee system is governed by the Board of Trustees of the University of Tennessee. After the passage of the UT FOCUS Act in 2018, the board is made up of 12 trustees. These trustees include one ex officio voting member, the Commissioner of Agriculture, 10 voting members appointed by the Governor, and a single non-voting student member appointed by the board as a whole. One of the board's committees includes a single faculty representative. Both the Student Trustee and faculty representative rotate each year between the four main campuses.

== Administration ==
The university system is administered by a president. Before 1970, the president was also chief executive of the Knoxville flagship campus. Since 1970, the president has been solely the head of the University of Tennessee system. Presidents and interim presidents of the University of Tennessee system, the University of Tennessee, and its predecessor schools are as follows:

- Randy Boyd, 2019–present
- Joseph A. DiPietro, named UT System President on October 23, 2010; served until November 2018
- John D. Petersen, named the system's 23rd President on July 1, 2004; resigned February 18, 2009
- John W. Shumaker, 2002–2003
- Emerson H. Fly, 2001–2002
- J. Wade Gilley, 1999–2001
- Joseph E. Johnson, 1991–1999; also served as interim president in 2003–2004
- Lamar Alexander, 1988–1991
- Edward J. Boling, 1970–1988
- Andrew D. Holt, 1959–1970; President of the UT System 1968–1970
- C. E. Brehm, 1946–1959
- James Dickason Hoskins, 1934–1946
- Harcourt A. Morgan, 1919–1934
- Brown Ayres, 1904–1919
- Charles W. Dabney, 1887–1904
- Thomas William Humes, (East Tennessee University), 1865–1879; President of UT 1879–1883
- J. J. Ridley (East Tennessee University), 1860–1862
- William D. Carnes (East Tennessee University), 1858–1860
- George Cooke (East Tennessee University), 1853–1857
- W. B. Reese (East Tennessee University), 1850–1853
- Joseph Estabrook, (East Tennessee College), 1834–1840; President of East Tennessee University 1840–1850
- James H. Piper (East Tennessee College), 1833–1834
- Charles Coffin (East Tennessee College), 1827–1832
- David Sherman (East Tennessee College), 1820–1825
- Samuel Carrick, (Blount College), 1794–1807; President of East Tennessee College 1807–1809

Before 1970, the Martin and Memphis facilities were treated as offsite departments of the Knoxville campus. Since 1970, the five UT campuses are administered by chancellors who report on an equal basis to UT's president. Most administrators on each campus report to their respective chancellors. The only exceptions are the athletic directors of the Knoxville campus, who report directly to the president and not the Knoxville chancellor.

== See also ==
- Tennessee Board of Regents, the other public higher education authority in the state
- List of state universities in the United States
