= University of Tennessee =

Public university in Knoxville, Tennessee, US

- Other names: Tennessee (colloquially); UT; UTK; UT Knoxville; UTenn
- Former names: Blount College (1794–1807); East Tennessee College (1807–1840); East Tennessee University (1840–1879)
- Motto: Veritatem cognoscetis, et veritas vos liberabit. (Latin)
- Motto in English: "You will know the truth and the truth shall set you free." On seal: "Agriculture, Commerce"
- Type: Public land-grant research university
- Established: September 10, 1794; 232 years ago
- Parent institution: University of Tennessee system
- Accreditation: SACS
- Academic affiliations: ORAU; URA; Sun Grant
- Endowment: $1.92 billion (2025) (system-wide)
- Chancellor: Donde Plowman
- President: Randy Boyd
- Provost: John Zomchick
- Faculty: 1,700+
- Administrative staff: 9,791
- Students: 40,784 (fall 2025)
- Undergraduates: 30,564 (fall 2024)
- Postgraduates: 8,164 (fall 2024)
- Location: Knoxville, Tennessee, United States; 35°57′6″N 83°55′48″W
- Campus: 600 acres (240 ha) Total, 2,128 acres (861 ha); Midsize city
- Newspaper: The Daily Beacon
- Colors: Orange, white, and smokey gray
- Nickname: Volunteers & Lady Volunteers
- Sporting affiliations: NCAA Division I FBS – SEC
- Mascot: Smokey XI
- Website: utk.edu

The University of Tennessee, Knoxville (or the University of Tennessee; UT; UT Knoxville; or colloquially UTK or Tennessee) is a public land-grant research university in Knoxville, Tennessee, United States. Founded in 1794, two years before Tennessee became the 16th state, it is the flagship campus of the University of Tennessee system, with 14 colleges. It hosts more than 30,000 students from all 50 states and more than 100 foreign countries.

Aerial of the university campus

UT's ties to nearby Oak Ridge National Laboratory, established under UT president Andrew Holt and continued under the UT–Battelle partnership, allow for considerable research opportunities for faculty and students. Also affiliated with the university are the Howard H. Baker Jr. School of Public Policy and Public Affairs, the University of Tennessee Anthropological Research Facility, and the University of Tennessee Arboretum, which occupies 250 acres (100 ha) of nearby Oak Ridge. The university is a direct partner of the University of Tennessee Medical Center, which is one of two Level I trauma centers in East Tennessee.

UT is one of the oldest public universities in the United States and the oldest secular institution west of the Eastern Continental Divide. It is classified among "R1: Doctoral Universities – Very high research activity".

== History ==
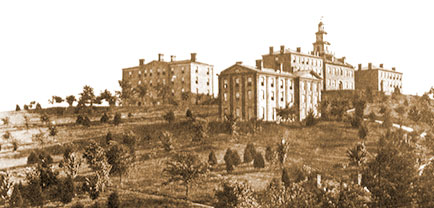
The Hill, the site of the university's first buildings

=== Founding and early days ===
On September 10, 1794, two years before Tennessee became a state and at a meeting of the legislature of the Southwest Territory at Knoxville, Blount College (named for Governor William Blount) was established with a charter. The new, non-sectarian, all-male, white-only institution struggled for 13 years with a small student body and faculty, and in 1807, the school was rechartered as East Tennessee College as a condition of receiving the proceeds from the settlement devised in the Compact of 1806. When Samuel Carrick, its first president and only faculty member, died in 1809, the school was temporarily closed until 1820. When it reopened, it began experiencing growing pains. Thomas Jefferson had previously recommended that the college leave its confining single building in the city and relocate to a place it could spread out. In the summer of 1826 (coincidentally, the year that Thomas Jefferson died), the trustees explored "Barbara Hill" (today known simply as The Hill) as a potential site and relocated there by 1828. In 1840, the college was elevated to East Tennessee University (ETU). The school's status as a religiously non-affiliated institution of higher learning was unusual for the period of time in which it was chartered, and the school is generally recognized as the oldest such establishment of its kind west of the Appalachian Divide.

=== Reconstruction ===
The state of Tennessee was a member of the Confederacy in 1862 when the Morrill Act was passed, providing for endowment funds from the sale of federal land to state agricultural colleges. On February 28, 1867, Congress passed a special Act making the State of Tennessee eligible to participate in the Morrill Act of 1862 program. In January 1869, the Reconstruction-era Tennessee state government designated ETU as Tennessee's recipient of the Land-Grant designation and funds.

As a land-grant institution, ETU was bound not to exclude any citizens of the state on the basis of color or race. To get around the requirement, the university chose to pay tuition for Black students to attend a separate institution, Fisk University. The following year, in 1870, the Tennessee Constitution was ratified with a provision, Article XI § 12, that prohibited public schools from enrolling both Black and White students, a policy that remained in place until the 1950s.

In accepting the land grant funds, the university would focus upon instructing students in military, agricultural, and mechanical subjects. Trustees soon approved the establishment of a medical program under the auspices of the Nashville School of Medicine and added advanced degree programs. East Tennessee University was renamed the University of Tennessee in 1879.

=== World War II ===
During World War II, UT was one of 131 colleges and universities nationally that took part in the V-12 Navy College Training Program which offered students a path to a Navy commission.

=== Civil rights era ===
Although the university was required to enroll students of any race or ethnicity as a public, land-grant institution, the Tennessee state constitution prohibited integrated education. Only white students were accepted until 1952, when the first two Black students were allowed to enroll in a graduate program. In 1954, Lillian Jenkins became the first African American to earn a degree from the university (graduated with a master's degree in special education. In 1956, R.B.J. Campbelle became the first African American to earn a Bachelor of Laws (LLB) degree, and three years later in 1959, Harry S. Blanton became the first to earn a doctorate degree (Doctor of Education (Ed.D) in educational administration and supervision).

Even after educational segregation was ruled unconstitutional by the Supreme Court in 1954 in Brown v. Board of Education, the university resisted desegregation. Black students could first enroll as undergraduates in 1961. In 1964, Brenda J. L. Peel became the first African American to earn an undergraduate degree at the university. In the same year, Alvin H. Crawford was the first Black to earn a Doctor of Medicine (MD) degree.

In 1967, Robert Kirk became the first African American full-time professor at the university.

African-American attorney Rita Sanders Geier filed suit against the state of Tennessee in 1968, alleging that its higher education system remained segregated despite a federal mandate ordering desegregation. She alleged that the opening of a University of Tennessee campus at Nashville would lead to the creation of another predominantly white institution that would strip resources from Tennessee State University, the only state-funded Historically black university. The suit was not settled until 2001, when the Geier Consent Decree resulted in the appropriation of $77 million in state funding to increase diversity among student and faculty populations among all Tennessee institutions of higher learning.

=== Modern era ===
In 2007, Carolyn Richardson Hodges became the first African-American woman to serve as vice provost and dean of the graduate school.

In 2012, Jamie Porter became the first African-American woman to earn a Ph.D. in nuclear engineering.

On December 15, 2016, the UT board of trustees confirmed Beverly J. Davenport as the next chancellor of the Knoxville campus, succeeding Jimmy Cheek. She was the first female chancellor of the university. On May 2, 2018, UT President Joe DiPietro fired Davenport, citing poor communication and interpersonal skills, among other reasons. The decision received criticism from the student body and faculty, as these reasons were also listed as Davenport's strengths and why DiPietro chose to hire her a little over one year earlier. She was retained as a faculty member.

== Organization ==
Colleges/Schools
- Herbert College of Agriculture
- College of Architecture & Design
- College of Arts & Sciences
- Haslam College of Business
- College of Communication & Information
- College of Education, Health & Human Sciences
- Tickle College of Engineering
- College of Emerging and Collaborative Studies
- Winston College of Law
- Natalie L. Haslam College of Music
- College of Nursing
- Howard H. Baker Jr. School of Public Policy and Public Affairs
- College of Social Work
- College of Veterinary Medicine

=== Administration ===
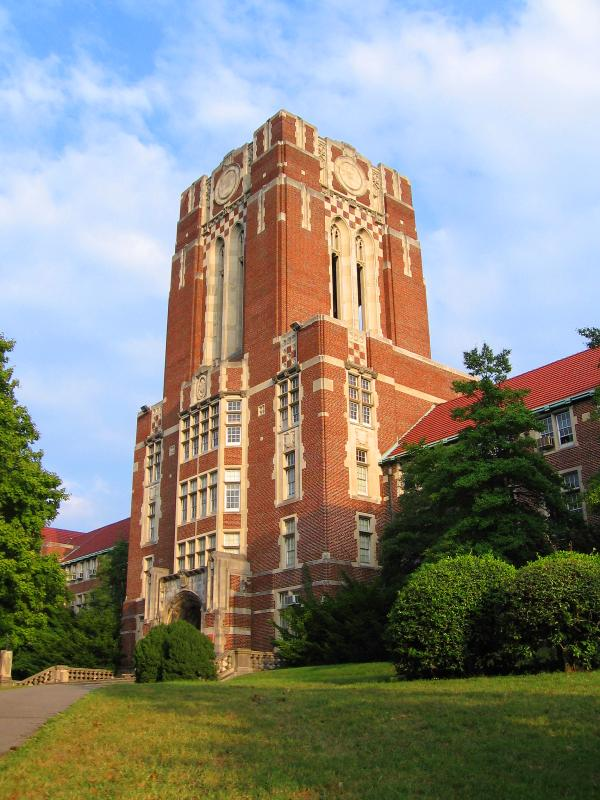
Ayres Hall

UT Knoxville is the flagship campus of the University of Tennessee system, which is governed by a 12-member board of trustees appointed by the Governor of Tennessee. The board of trustees appoints a president to oversee the operations of the system, four campuses, and two statewide institutes. Randy Boyd is the current president following the retirement of Joseph A. DiPietro. The president appoints, with board approval, chancellors for each campus. The Knoxville campus has been headed by Chancellor Donde Plowman since 2019. Provost and Senior Vice Chancellor John Zomchick is responsible for the academic administration of the Knoxville campus and is a member of the Chancellor's Cabinet.

=== University Medical Center ===
The University of Tennessee Medical Center, administered by University Health Systems and affiliated with the University of Tennessee Graduate School of Medicine, collaborates with the University of Tennessee Health Science Center to attract and train the majority of its medical staff. Many doctors and nurses at UTMC have integrated careers as teachers and healthcare professionals, and the center promotes itself as the area's only academic, or "teaching hospital".

The University Medical Center is the primary referral center for East Tennessee, Western North Carolina, and Southeastern Kentucky. It is one of three Level I trauma centers in the East Tennessee geographic region. Extensive expansion programs were embarked upon the 1990s and 2000s (decade) and saw the construction of two sprawling additions to the hospital's campus, a new Cancer Institute and a Heart Lung Vascular Institute. The new UT Medical Center Heart Hospital received its first patient on April 27, 2010.

=== Tennessee Presidents Center ===
The University of Tennessee is the only university in the nation to have three presidential papers editing projects. The university holds collections of the papers of all three U.S. presidents from Tennessee—Andrew Jackson, James K. Polk, and Andrew Johnson.

== Academics ==
=== Undergraduate admissions ===
Undergraduate admissions statistics
- 2023 entering class
- Admit rate: 46.0% (▼ −31.8)
- Yield rate: 28.8% (▼ −4)

Test scores middle 50%
- SAT Total: 1190–1340
- ACT Composite: 25–31

High school GPA
- Average: 4.19

The 2022 annual ranking of U.S. News & World Report categorizes UT as "more selective". In 2023, the university received 50,488 applications. It extended offers of admission to 23,221 applicants, or 46%, after holistic review that includes examination of academic rigor, performance and admissions test scores. 6,694 accepted students chose to enroll, a yield rate of 29%. Of all matriculating students, the average high school GPA was 4.19; of incoming students who submitted SAT scores, the interquartile range was 1190–1340; of incoming students who submitted ACT scores, the interquartile range was 25–31. UT's 2023 freshman retention rate is 91.1%, with 73.5% going on to graduate from the university within six years

Fall First-Time Freshman Statistics
| | 2024 | 2023 | 2022 | 2021 | 2020 | 2019 | 2018 | 2017 | 2016 |
|---|---|---|---|---|---|---|---|---|---|
| Applicants | 59,764 | 50,488 | 36,290 | 29,909 | 25,423 | 21,764 | 20,457 | 18,872 | 17,583 |
| Admits | 24,863 | 23,221 | 24,826 | 22,413 | 19,867 | 17,160 | 15,912 | 14,526 | 13,578 |
| Admit rate | 41.6 | 46.0 | 68.4 | 74.9 | 78.1 | 78.8 | 77.8 | 77.0 | 77.2 |
| Enrolled | 6,804 | 6,694 | 6,846 | 5,948 | 5,512 | 5,254 | 5,215 | 4,895 | 4,851 |
| Yield rate | 27.4 | 28.8 | 27.6 | 26.5 | 27.7 | 30.6 | 32.8 | 33.7 | 35.7 |
| ACT composite* (out of 36) | — | 25–31 | 25–30 | 25–31 | 25–31 | 24–30 | 25–31 | 25–30 | 24–30 |
| SAT composite* (out of 1600) | — | 1190–1340 | — | 1180–1340 | 1140–1290 | 1140–1310 | 1150–1330 | 1140–1310 | — |
* middle 50% range

=== Rankings ===
Academic rankings

National
- Forbes: 144
- U.S. News & World Report: 102 (tie)
- Washington Monthly: 152
- WSJ/College Pulse: 193

Global
- ARWU: 201–300
- QS: =607
- THE: 301–350
- U.S. News & World Report: 245 (tie)

The University of Tennessee was tied for 49th among public universities and tied for 102nd among "national universities" in the United States by U.S. News & World Report in its 2026 rankings.

The university was also ranked as the most LGBTQ-unfriendly university in the United States by The Princeton Review among all 388 institutions it surveyed for its 2023 rankings. The campus Pride Center has been defunded and vandalized several times.

=== Research ===
The total research expenditures of the UT Knoxville campus were $324.4M for FY 2022. UT Knoxville boasts several faculty who are among the leading contributors to their fields, including Harry McSween, generally recognized as one of the world's leading experts in the study of meteorites and a member of the science team for Mars Pathfinder and later a co-investigator for the Mars Odyssey and Mars Exploration Rovers projects. The University of Tennessee ranked 6th in US Department of Energy funding for FY 2021.

==== Oak Ridge National Laboratory ====
The major hub of research at the University of Tennessee is Oak Ridge National Laboratory (ORNL), one of the largest government laboratories in the United States. ORNL is a major center of civilian and governmental research and features two of the world's most powerful supercomputers.

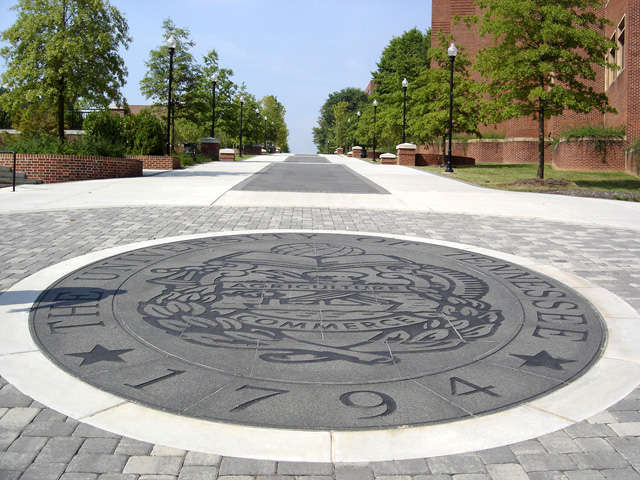
Looking west along the Pedestrian Walkway

==== Howard H. Baker Jr. School of Public Policy and Public Affairs ====
The Howard H. Baker Jr. School of Public Policy and Public Affairs regularly holds events relative to the center's three major areas of focus which are Energy & Environment, Global Security, and Leadership & Government.

=== Agricultural Campus ===
Through 21 departments, the agricultural (nicknamed "Ag") campus offers 11 undergraduate majors, 13 undergrad minors, 14 graduate programs, and veterinary medicine majors. The campus supports academics, research and community outreach. The University of Tennessee Anthropological Research Facility, nicknamed the "Body Farm", is located near the University of Tennessee Medical Center on Alcoa Highway (US 129). Founded by William M. Bass in 1972, the Body Farm endeavors to increase anthropological and forensic knowledge specifically related to the decomposition of the human body and is one of the leading centers for such research in the United States.

=== Cherokee Research Campus ===
On March 16, 2009, the university broke ground on a 188-acre (76 ha) campus in downtown Knoxville that is devoted to nanotechnology, neutron science, materials science, energy, climate studies, environmental science, and biomedical science.

=== Space Institute ===
The University of Tennessee Space Institute, located in Tullahoma, Tennessee, is an extension of the Knoxville campus supporting research and graduate studies in aerospace engineering and related fields. The Space Institute is home to various supersonic wind tunnels used by the Department of Mechanical, Aerospace, and Biomedical Engineering. This includes Mach 2, Mach 2.3, and Mach 4 facilities. A Mach 7 wind tunnel was completed in 2021 to support hypersonic flight research. The Space Institute is also home to the Center of Laser Applications (CLA).

== Student life ==
=== Student body ===
Undergraduate demographics as of Fall 2023
| Race and ethnicity | Total |
|---|---|
| White | 79% |
| Hispanic | 6% |
| Two or more races | 5% |
| Asian | 4% |
| Black | 4% |
| International student | 1% |
| Unknown | 1% |
Economic diversity
| Low-income (Note: The percentage of students who received an income-based federal Pell grant intended for low-income students.) | 22% |
| Affluent (Note: The percentage of students who are a part of the American middle class at the bare minimum.) | 78% |

In Fall 2023, the university enrolled 28,883 undergraduate and 7,421 graduate and professional students; 54.6% of students are female, 45.4% are male. UT hosts students from all 50 U.S. states and over 90 foreign countries. 22,922 students come from Tennessee, and the next three most popular U.S. states are Georgia, Virginia, and North Carolina. The top three home countries of international students are China, India, and Bangladesh.

=== Organizations ===
The University of Tennessee has over 450 registered student organizations. These groups cater to a variety of interests and provide options for those interested in service, sports, arts, social activities, government, politics, cultural issues, and Greek societies.

The university operates two radio stations: student-run The Rock (formerly the Torch) (WUTK-FM 90.3 MHz) and National Public Radio affiliate WUOT-FM 91.9 MHz. The university's first radio station was on the AM frequency 850 kHz, a donation from Knoxville radio station WIVK-AM/FM. The Phoenix, a literary art magazine, is published in the fall and spring semesters and showcases student artistic creativity.

The Volunteer Channel

The Volunteer Channel (TVC) is the university's student run television station. TVC reaches nearly 7,000 UT students in residence halls and 100,000 residents in surrounding counties on Comcast Digital Channel 194.

=== The Daily Beacon ===
The Daily Beacon is the editorially independent student newspaper of UT's campus. It began in 1906 as The Orange & White and became a staple on the campus landscape, publishing for 61 years. The Daily Beacon was established as its successor in 1965, taking over in spring 1967. It printed 10,000 daily copies weekly prior to moving online. It now distributes 2,100 copies per week and produces daily online content about the campus and the surrounding area.

=== The Rock ===
Unearthed in the 1960s, the Rock probably soon thereafter became a "canvas" for student messages. For years the university sandblasted away the messages but eventually deferred to students' artistic endeavors. The Daily Beacon has editorialized: "Originally a smaller rock, the Rock has grown in prestige and size while thousands of coats of paint have been thrown on its jagged face. Really, its function is as an open forum for students."

=== Greek institutions ===
The University of Tennessee hosts roughly 20 sororities and 30 fraternities. Approximately 20% of undergraduate men and 30% of undergraduate women are active in Greek organizations.

== Athletics ==
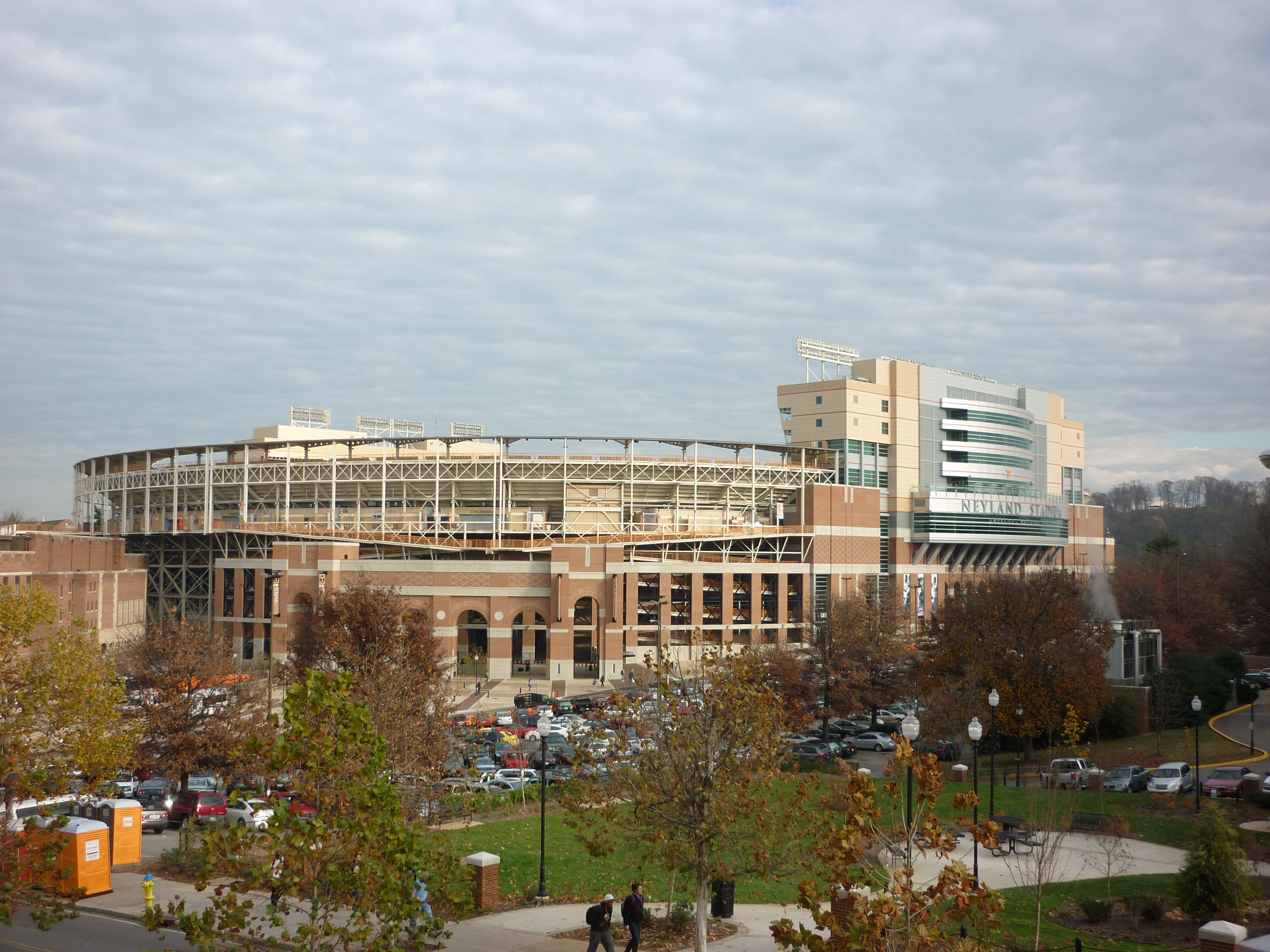
Neyland Stadium

UT athletics logo, known as the "Power T"

Tennessee competes in the Southeastern Conference (SEC). They formerly competed in the SEC's Eastern Division, along with Florida, Georgia, Kentucky, Missouri, South Carolina, and Vanderbilt, prior to the elimination of divisional groupings in 2024. The only UT team that does not compete in the SEC is the women's rowing program, which competes as a single-sport member of the Big 12 Conference.

The Tennessee Lady Volunteers basketball team has won eight NCAA Division I titles (1987, 1989, 1991, 1996, 1997, 1998, 2007, 2008); only Connecticut, with twelve titles, has more championships. Their former head coach, Pat Summitt, is the all-time winningest basketball coach in NCAA history and had a 100 percent graduation rate for all players who finished their career at UT. Women's basketball rivals for Tennessee within the conference include Georgia, Vanderbilt, and LSU.

In August 2014, University of Tennessee students were given the opportunity to vote for a name for the Neyland Stadium student section. The name "Rocky Top Rowdies" was selected over "General's Quarters", "Smokey's Howl", "Vol Army", and "Big Orange Crew".

On November 10, 2014, as part of a university-wide branding overhaul, the UT athletic department announced that starting with the 2015–16 school year, all UT women's teams except for basketball would drop "Lady" from their nickname and become simply "Volunteers". The rebranding coincided with UT's switch from Adidas to Nike as its uniform supplier. The change was unpopular and the name "Lady Volunteers" has since returned.

=== Club sports ===
Sports include tennis, pickleball, lacrosse, rugby, soccer, wrestling, hockey, running, crew, golf, water polo, ballroom dance, and paintball. Some teams join intercollegiate conferences.

=== Colors ===
Charles Moore, president of the university's athletic association, chose orange and white for the school colors on April 12, 1889. His inspiration is said to have come from orange and white daisies which grew on the Hill. To this day there are still orange and white flowers grown outside the University Center. Although students confirmed the colors at a special meeting in 1892, dissatisfaction caused the colors to be dropped. No other acceptable colors could be agreed on, however, and the original colors were reinstated a day later. The University of Tennessee's official colors are UT Orange (Pantone 151), White, and Smokey Gray (Pantone 426).

=== Pride of the Southland Band ===
Five-minute video of the open of a football game

The Pride of the Southland Band (or simply The Pride) is UT's marching band. As one of the oldest institutions at the university, the band partakes in many of the gameday traditions. At every home game, the Pride performs the "March to the Stadium" which includes a parade sequence and climaxes when the band stops at the bottom of The Hill and performs the "Salute to the Hill", an homage to the history and legacy of the university. The band is known for its pregame show at the beginning of every home game, which ends with the football team running onto the field through the "Opening of the T".

=== Nickname ===
Tennessee is known as the "Volunteer State" for the large number of Tennesseans who volunteered for duty in the War of 1812, the Mexican–American War, and the American Civil War. A UT athletic team was dubbed the Volunteers for the first time in 1902 by the Atlanta Constitution before a football game against the Georgia Tech Yellow Jackets, although the Knoxville Journal and Tribune did not use the name until 1905. By the fall of 1905 both the Journal and the then-Sentinel were using the nickname.

== Notable people ==
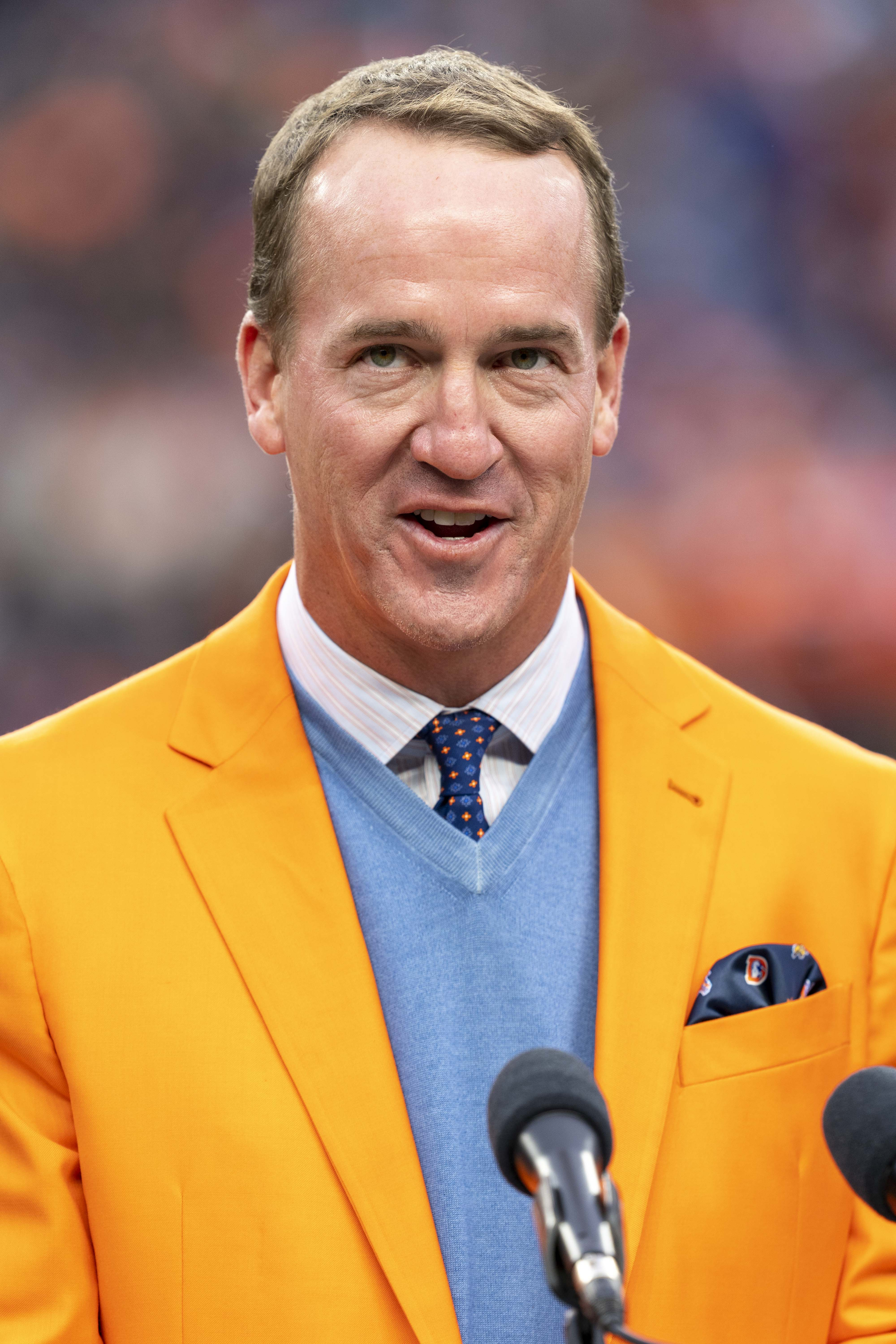
Peyton Manning, Hall of Fame NFL quarterback

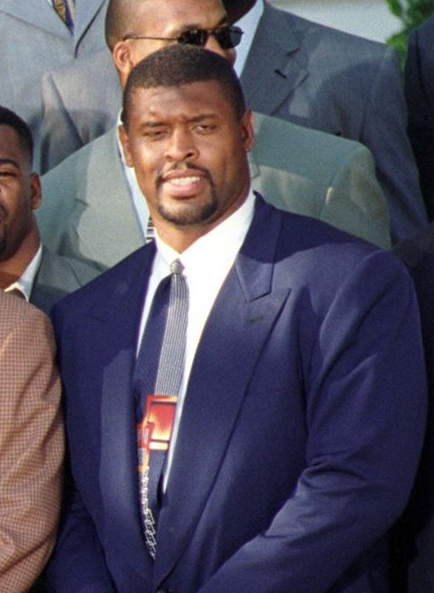
Reggie White, Hall of Fame NFL defensive end

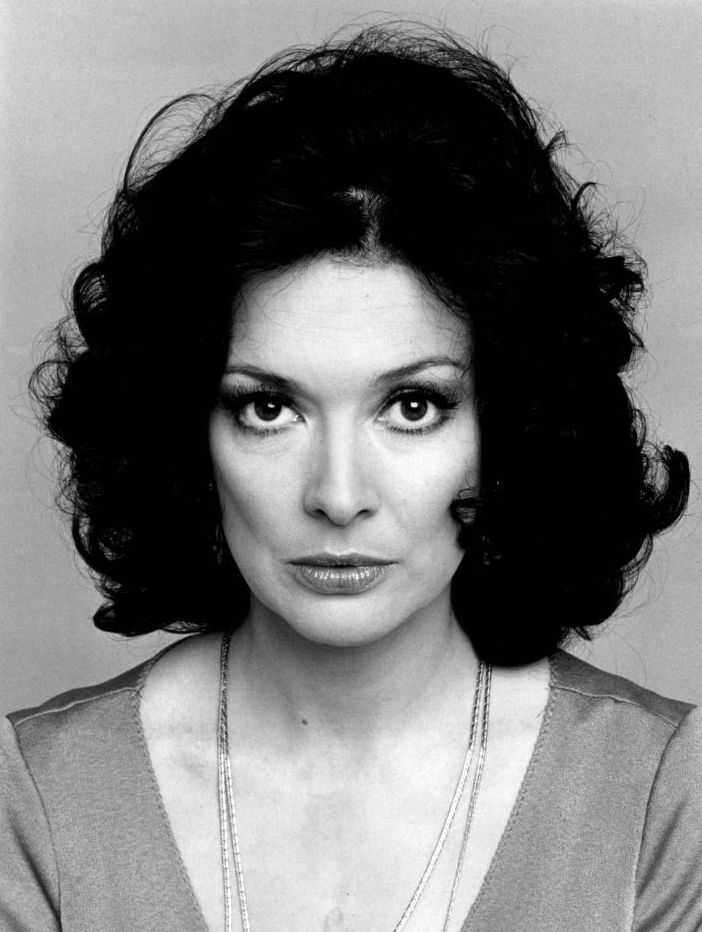
Dixie Carter, actress

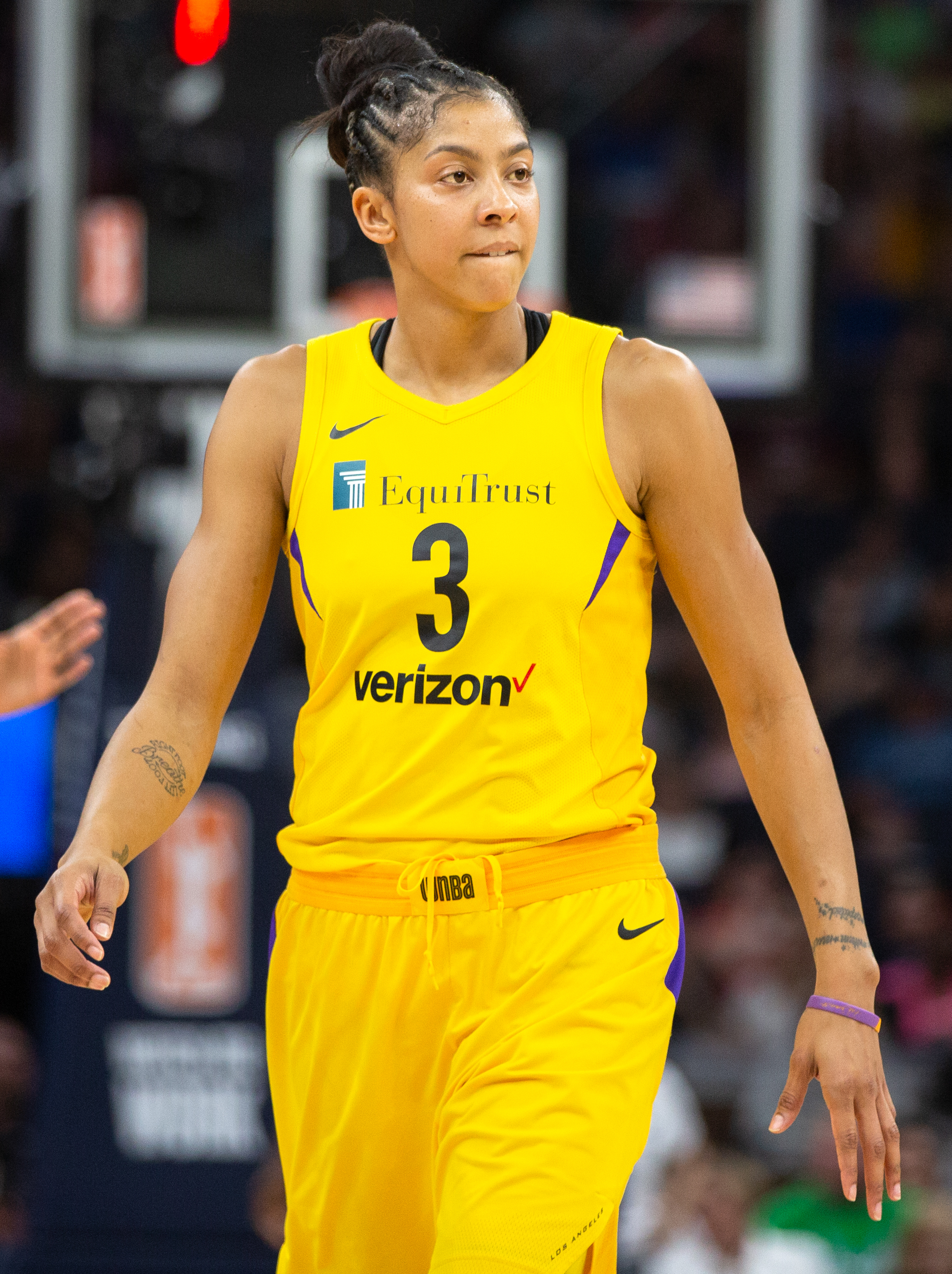
Candace Parker, professional women's basketball player

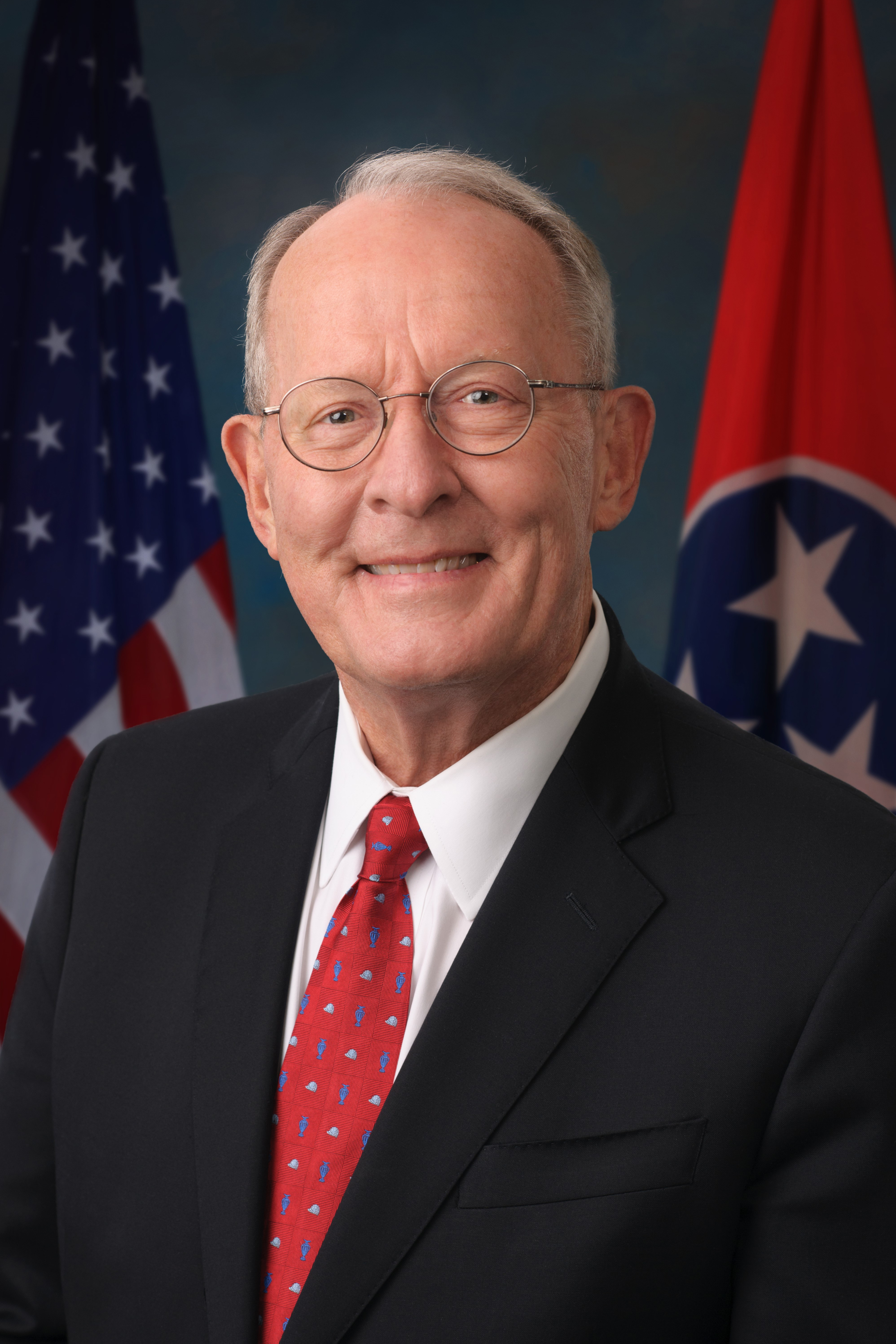
Lamar Alexander, former US Senator

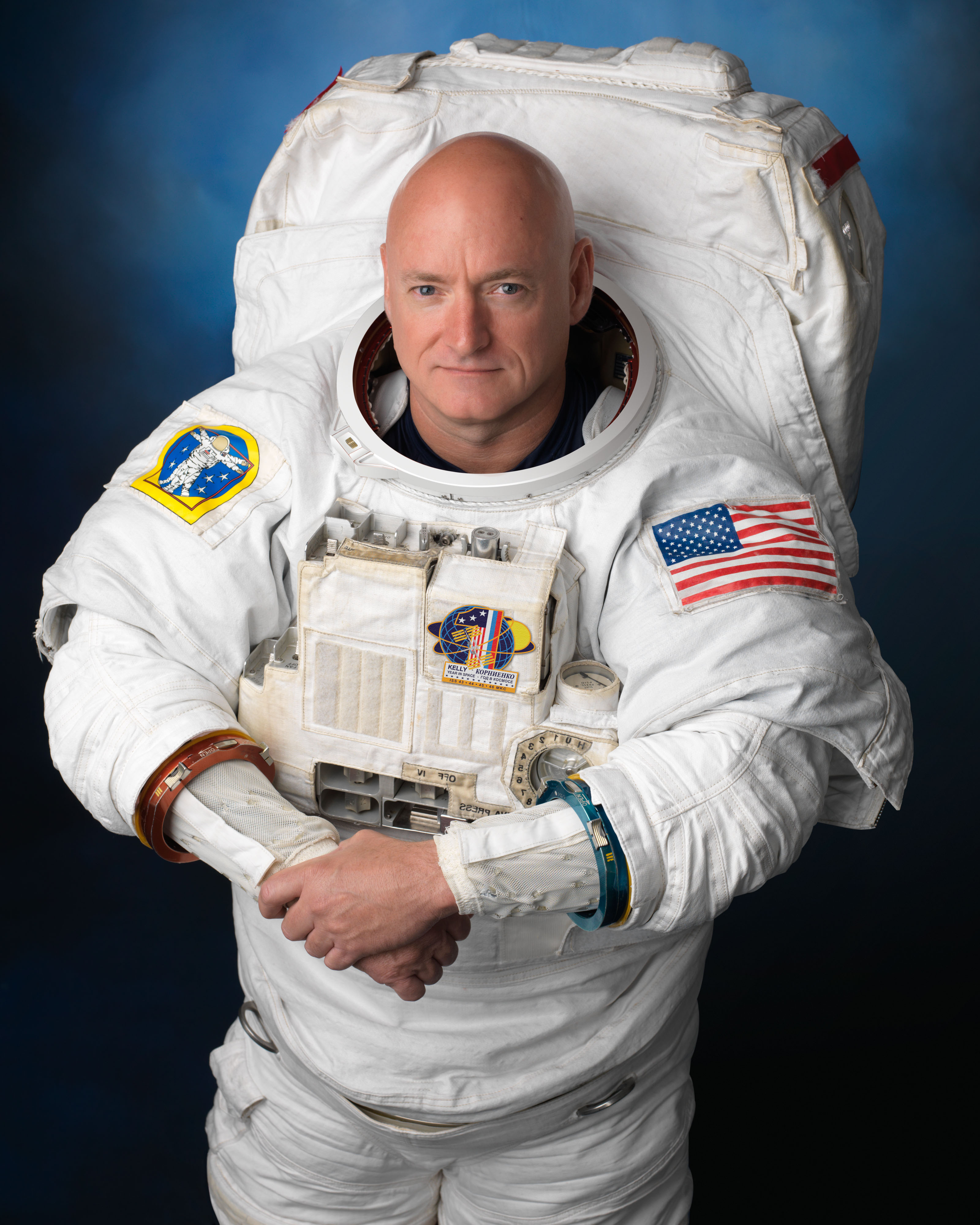
Scott Kelly, astronaut

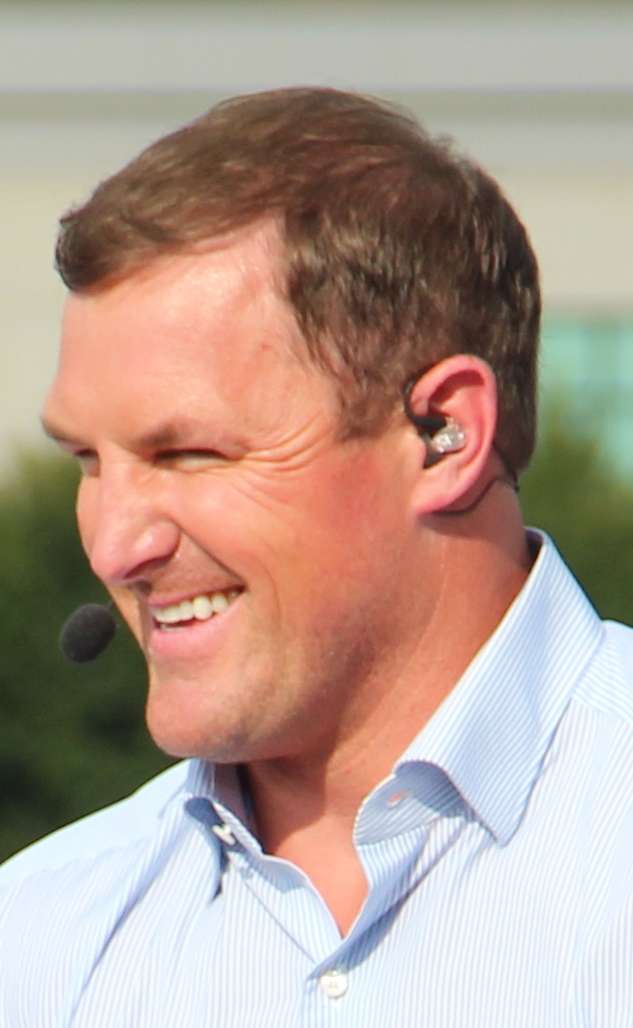
Jason Witten, NFL tight end

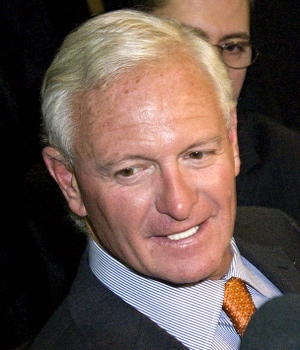
Jimmy Haslam, owner of Cleveland Browns and Columbus Crew

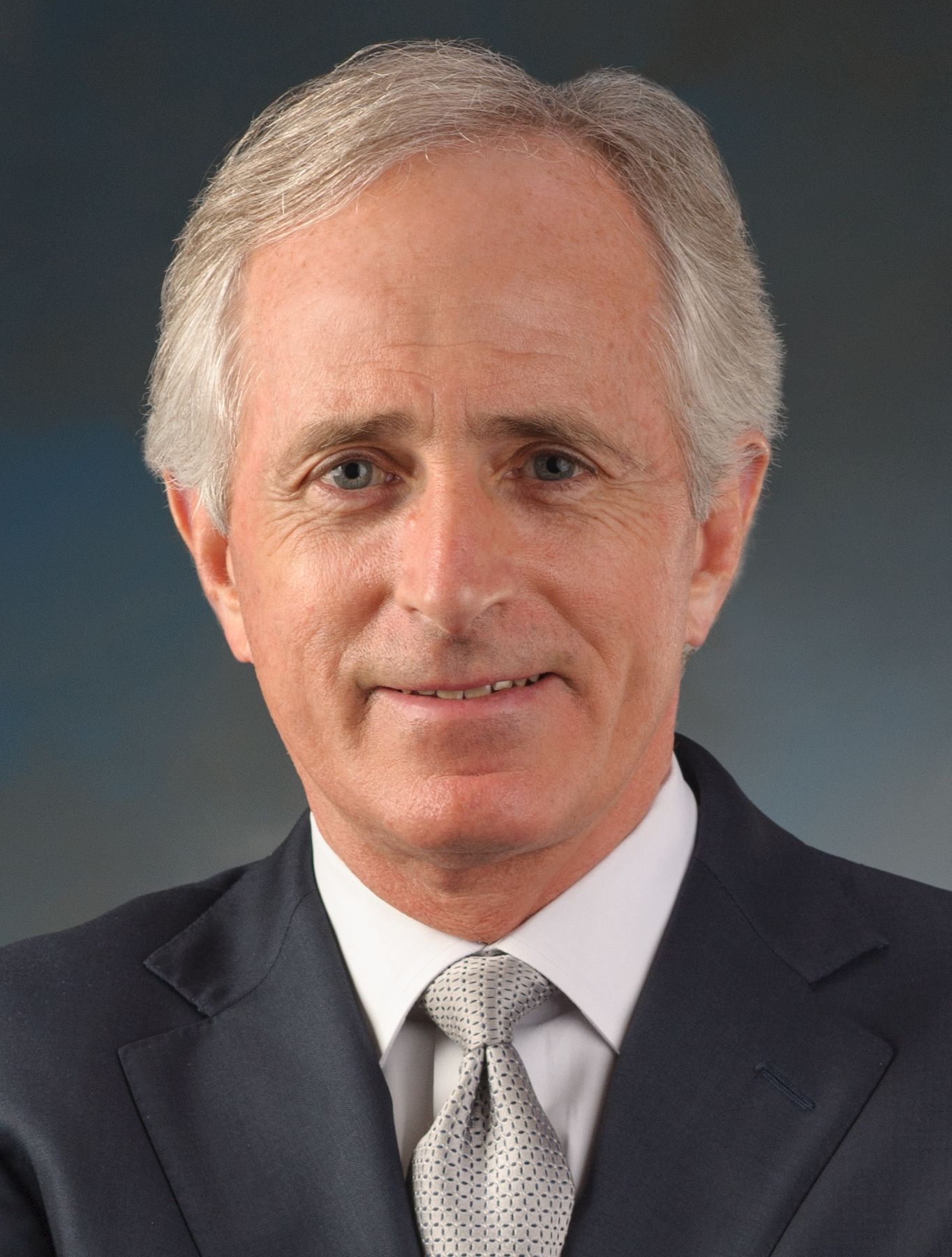
Bob Corker, former U.S. Senator

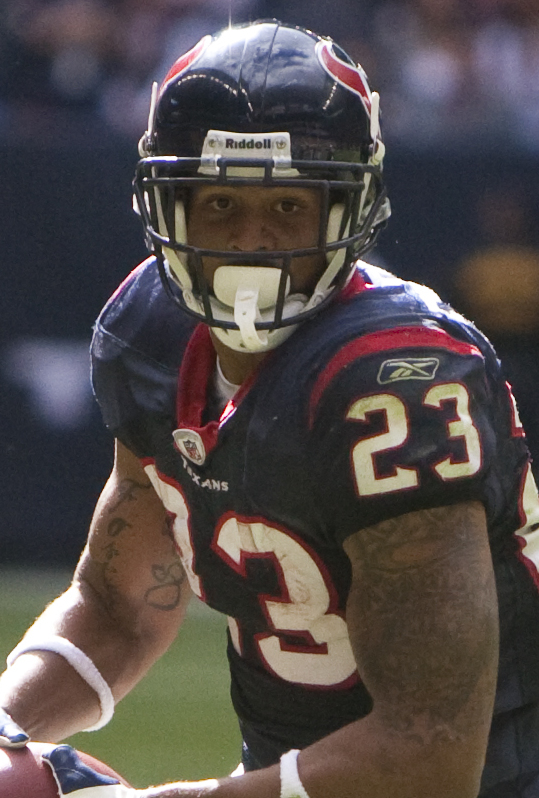
Arian Foster, NFL running back

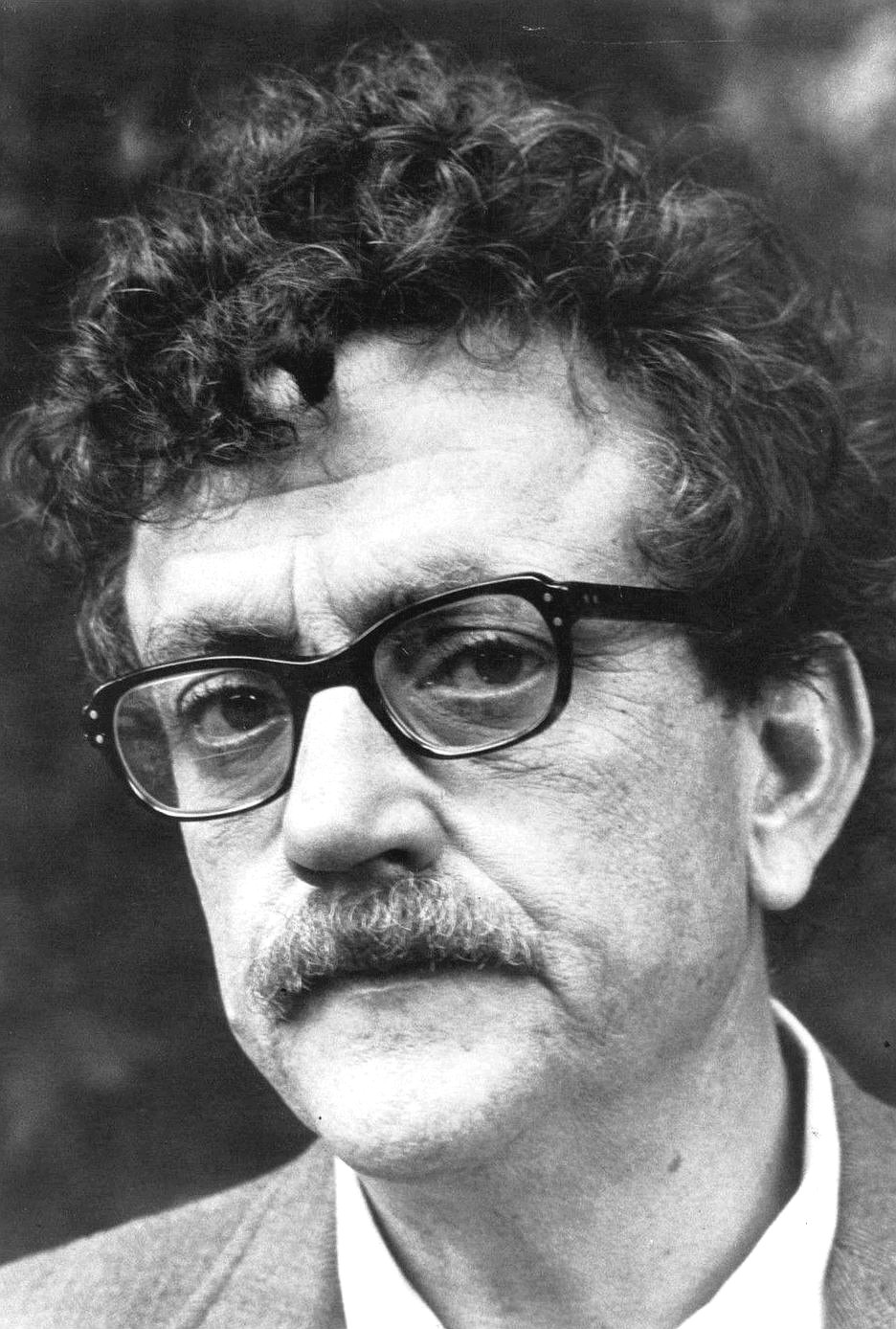
Kurt Vonnegut, author

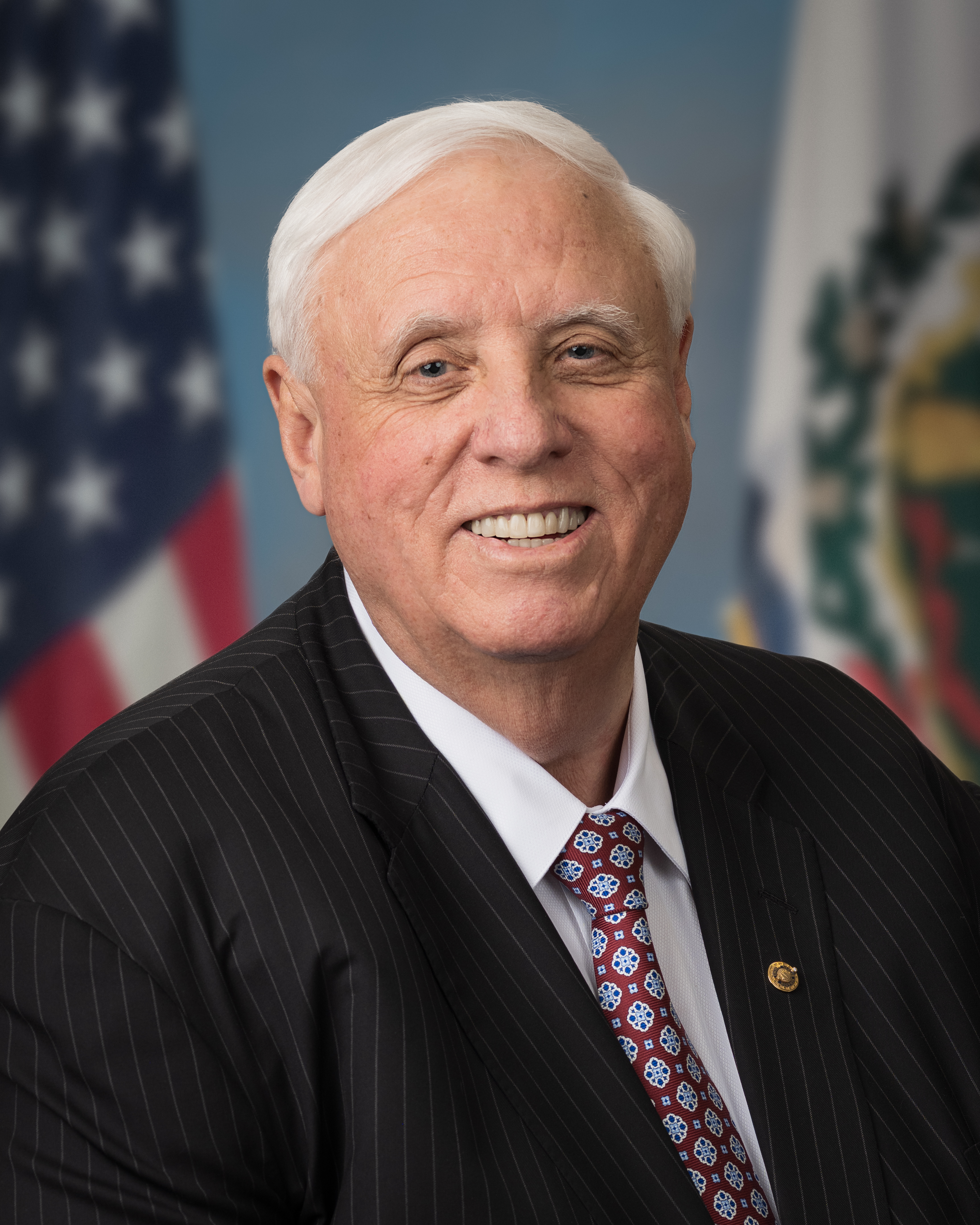
Jim Justice, US Senator from West Virginia

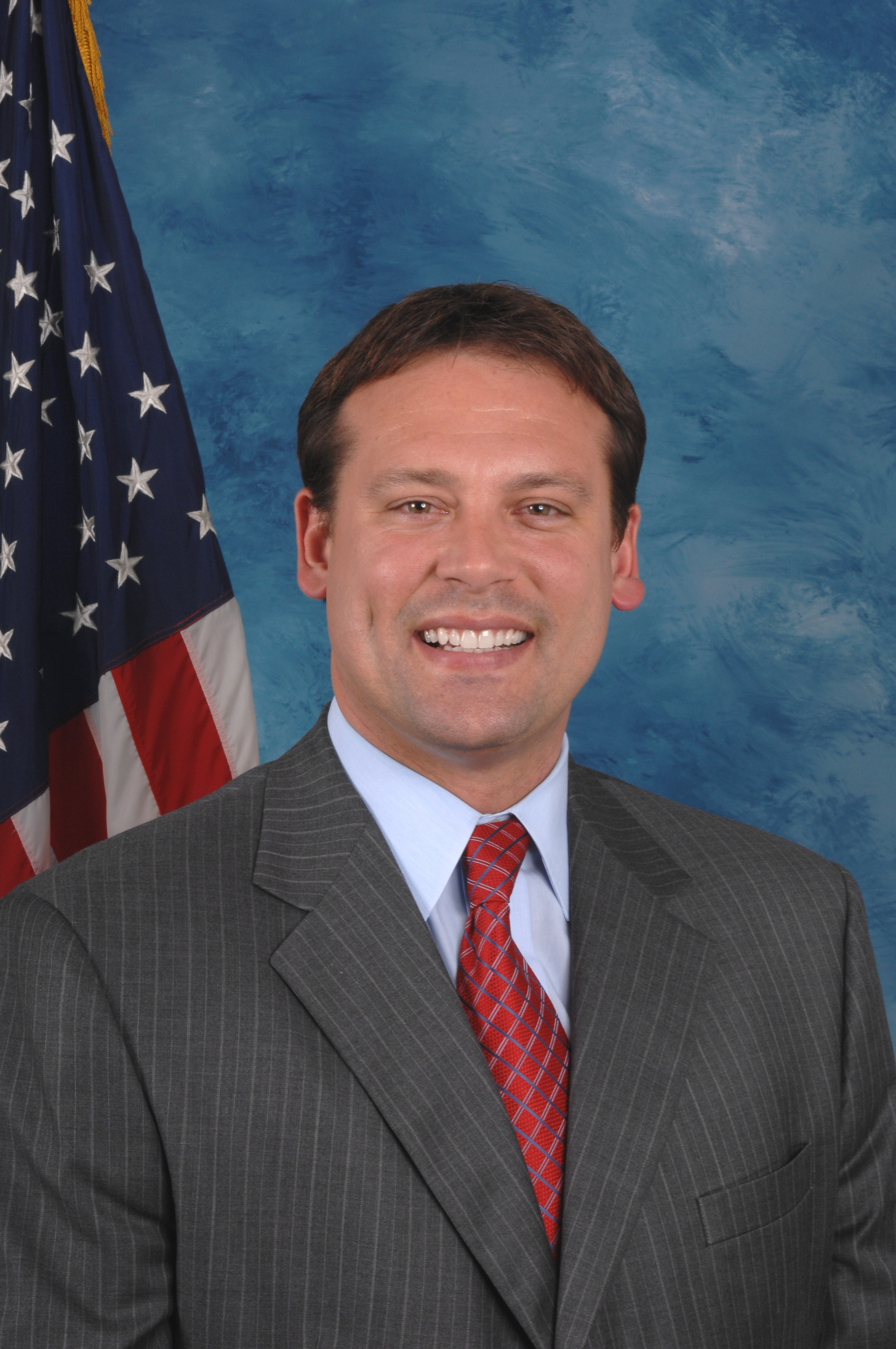
Heath Shuler, former NFL quarterback and U.S. Congressman

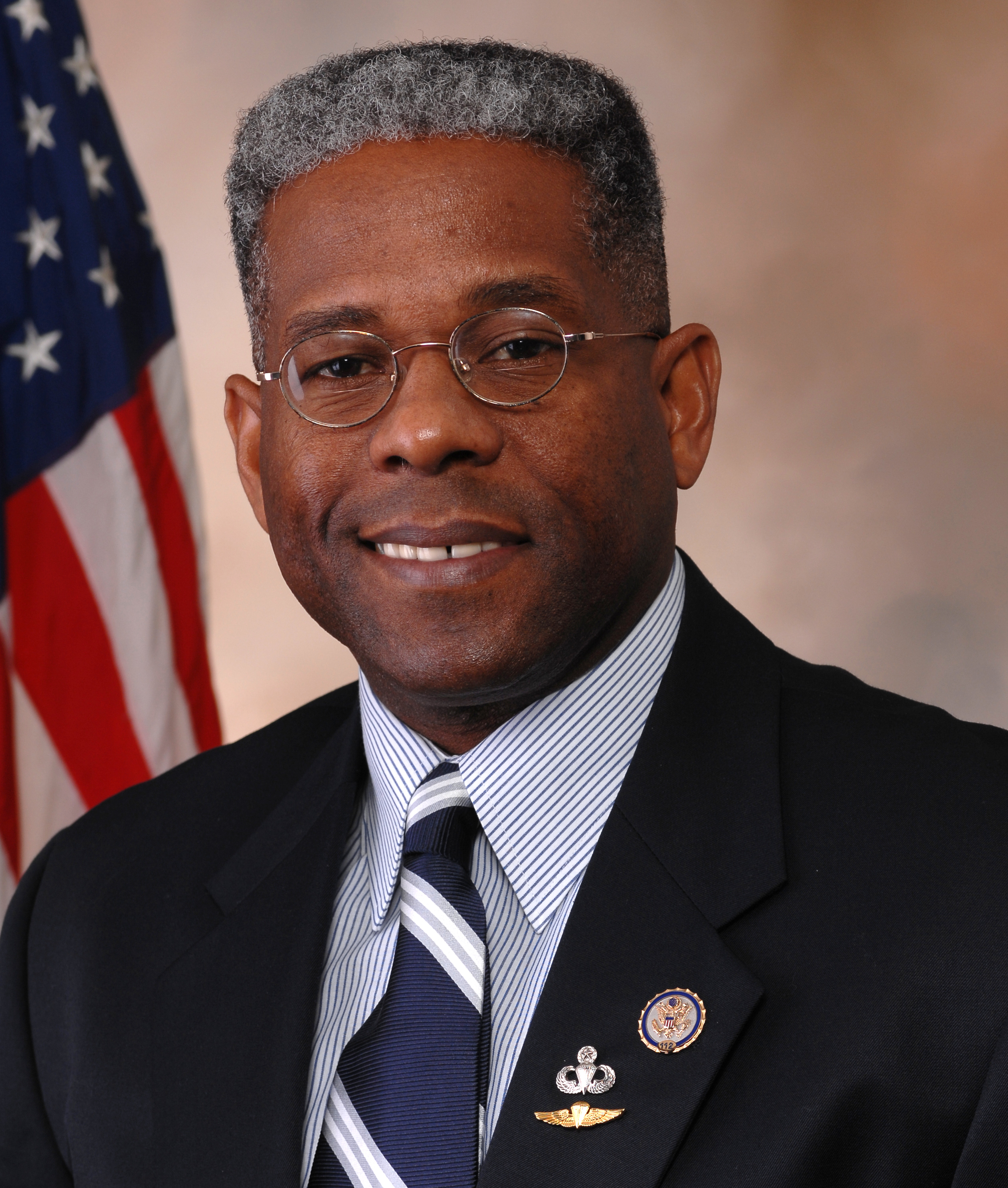
Allen West, former Chair of the Texas Republican Party and former US Congressman

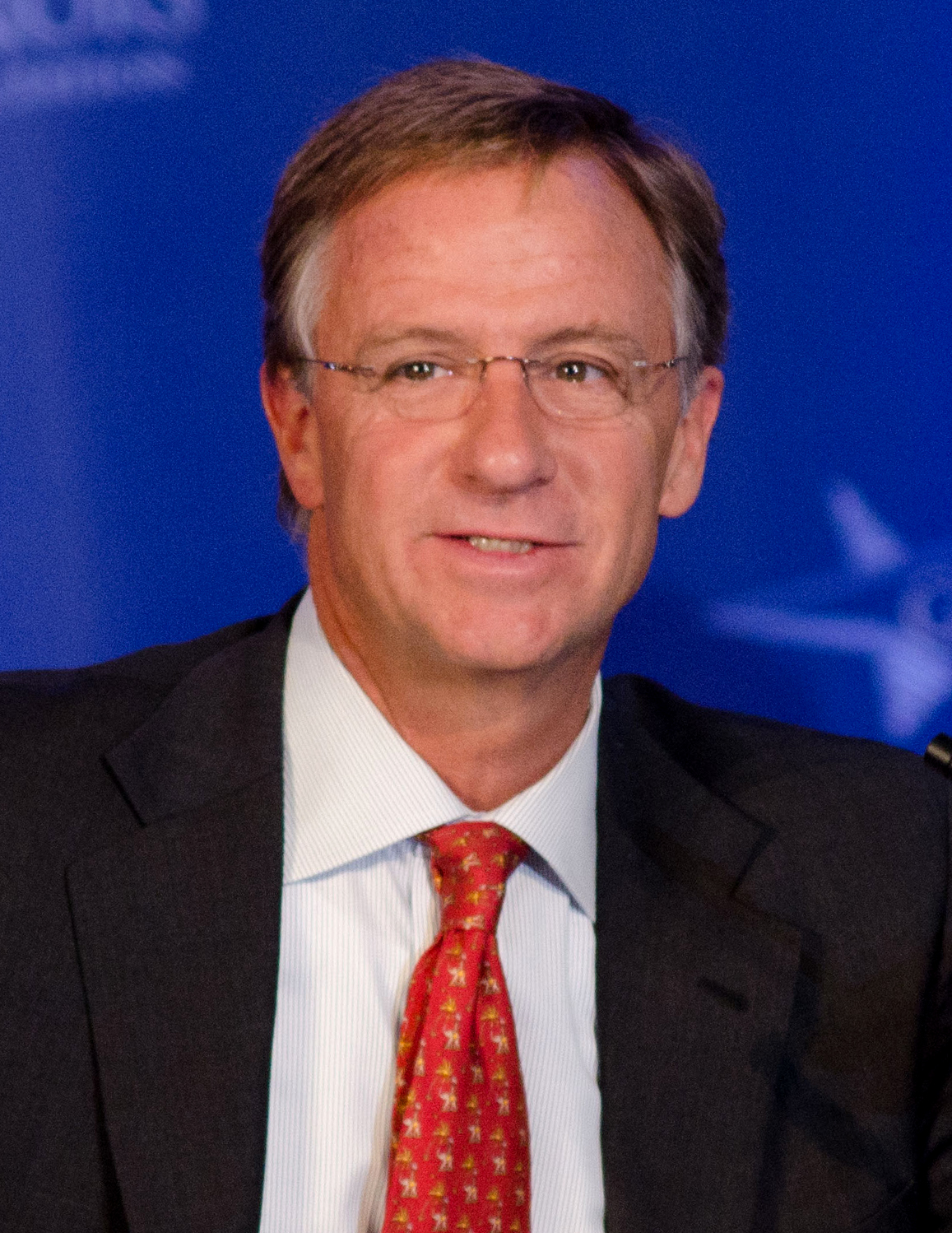
Bill Haslam, 49th Governor of Tennessee and owner of Nashville Predators

Nine of its alumni have been selected as Rhodes Scholars and one alumnus, James M. Buchanan, received the 1986 Nobel Prize in Economics. It is a top producer of Fulbright scholars.

== See also ==
- East Tennessee Female Institute
- East Tennessee Historical Society
- University of Tennessee Press
