= List of University of Louisville people =

The following is a list of people associated with the University of Louisville.

== Notable alumni ==
=== Arts and entertainment ===
- Harriette Simpson Arnow (BS, 1930) – former author, best known for The Dollmaker
- Terry Bisson (BA, 1964) – contemporary science fiction author
- Nick DeMartino (BA) – former senior vice president, Media and Technology for the American Film Institute
- Bob Edwards (BA, 1969) – former host of NPR's Morning Edition, host of The Bob Edwards Show on XM Satellite Radio and PRI's Bob Edwards Weekend
- Howard Fineman (JD, 1975) – Newsweek chief political analyst
- Sam Gilliam (BFA, 1955; MFA, 1961) – painter, specializing in color field and abstract art
- Sue Grafton (BA, 1961) – contemporary detective novel author
- Edward N. Hamilton Jr (BFA, 1969) – sculptor, works include York, the Spirit of Freedom, and the Amistad Memorial
- Michael Jackman – columnist, poet, essayist, fiction writer, and college professor
- Jenny Kiefer – horror author
- Static Major – singer, songwriter, most famous from his work with Lil Wayne on "Lollipop"
- Delfeayo Marsalis (MA, 2004) – jazz trombonist and record producer; brother of Wynton Marsalis and son of Ellis Marsalis
- Amanda Matthews (BA) – sculptor and painter
- Beverle Graves Myers – author of historical mystery novels and short stories
- Mary Spencer Nay (BA, 1941; MA, 1960) – painter and printmaker
- Marsha Norman (BA, 1969) – Pulitzer Prize and Tony Award-winning playwright
- Barbara A. Perry (BA, 1978) – author; political analyst; Senior Fellow, University of Virginia Miller Center of Public Affairs; former Carter Glass Professor of Government, Sweet Briar College
- Diane Sawyer – attended but did not graduate law school; anchor of ABC World News
- Ben Sollee – cellist, singer, and songwriter
- Henry Strater – painter, illustrator
- Kevin M. Sullivan – true crime author, historian
- Kenneth Victor Young (BA, MA) – painter, designer, educator

=== Business ===
- Owsley Brown Frazier (BA, 1958; JD. 1960) – former director of Brown-Forman Corporation
- Robert Nardelli (MBA, 1975) – CEO of Chrysler; former CEO of Home Depot; former CEO of General Electric Company
- Frank Neuhauser (BS, 1934) – patent attorney; winner of the first National Spelling Bee in 1925
- Sadiqa Reynolds (BS, 1993) – CEO of the Perception Institute; former president and CEO of the Louisville Urban League
- Leslie Stephen Wright (1913–1997) – president of Samford University in Birmingham, Alabama 1958–83

=== Politics ===
- David L. Armstrong (JD, 1969) – former mayor of Louisville (1996–2002)
- Reuf Bajrovic – former Minister of Energy of Federation of Bosnia and Herzegovina (BA, 2000)
- Jared Bauman (BS. 2008) – politician
- Solon Borland (MD, 1841) – former U.S. senator (D), Arkansas
- Adrielle Camuel – politician
- Beverly Chester-Burton (born 1963) – politician
- Christopher Dodd (JD, 1972) – former U.S. senator (D), Connecticut
- James B. Edwards (DMD, 1955) – former U.S. Secretary of Energy and governor of South Carolina
- Charles R. Farnsley (LLB, 1926) – Kentucky General Assembly 1936–40; mayor of Louisville 1948–53; U.S. House of Representatives 1965–67
- Gina Haspel – director of CIA (BA, 1978)
- Henry D. Hatfield (DMD, 1900) – former U.S. senator and governor of West Virginia
- David L. Huber – former U.S. attorney for the Western District of Kentucky
- Addison James – United States representative from Kentucky
- Thomas Lee Judge – 18th governor of Montana
- John A. Logan (JD, 1851) – Union general in the Civil War, won Medal of Honor at Vicksburg, led Union forces at Battle of Atlanta, senator for Illinois
- Romano Mazzoli (JD, 1960) – representative for KY's 3rd US Congressional District 1971–95
- Mitch McConnell (BA, 1964) – U.S. senator and majority leader (R), Kentucky
- Louie Nunn (JD, 1950) – governor of Kentucky (1967–1971)
- Jim Smith – member of the Indiana Senate
- Evan B. Stotsenburg – president pro tempore of the Indiana Senate; Indiana attorney general (1915–1917)
- Troy Stubbs – member of the Alabama House of Representatives
- Ephraim L. Van Winkle – secretary of state of Kentucky (1863–1866)
- John S. Van Winkle – secretary of state of Kentucky (1866–1867)
- Ben Waide (BS) – member of the Kentucky House of Representatives

=== Religion ===
- Aryeh Kaplan (BA, 1961) – Orthodox rabbi, author, and translator known for his knowledge of physics and kabbalah

=== Science and engineering ===
- James Gilbert Baker (BA, 1935) – winner of Presidential Award for Merit, developed the Baker-Schmidt telescope, pushed for U2 spy plane development
- Lawrence F. Dahl (BS, 1951) – professor emeritus of chemistry at the University of Wisconsin–Madison
- Keith Fitzgerald (BA, 1994) – political scientist and immigration policy pundit
- Thomas L. Maddin (1826–1908) – Confederate physician, professor of medicine at the Vanderbilt University School of Medicine
- David Meade – book author
- Renã A. S. Robinson (BS, 2000) – spectrometry, proteomics, Alzheimer's disease and aging
- Gary Sullivan (BS, 1982; MEng 1983) – researcher and standardization leader in video compression technology including H.264/AVC and HEVC
- Chang-Lin Tien (MEng, 1957) – UC Berkeley chancellor 1990–97; engineering scholar

== Notable faculty ==
- William Burke Belknap – economist; hardware manufacturer; philanthropist; horse breeder; professor of Economics at the University of Louisville
- Jim Chen – legal scholar and expert on constitutional law
- Colin Crawford – legal scholar and dean of the University of Louisville School of Law
- Paul W. Ewald – evolutionary biologist
- Agnes Moore Fryberger – first director of music appreciation at the university
- Kee Chang Huang – distinguished professor of pharmacology
- Michael Jackman – columnist, poet, essayist and fiction writer
- Melanie B. Jacobs – legal scholar and dean of the University of Louisville School of Law
- John LaBarbera – jazz professor, nominated for 2005 Grammy award in the Best Large Jazz Ensemble category for his CD On the Wild Side
- Justin McCarthy – discredited Armenian genocide denier
- Tom Owen – professor of Libraries and Community Relations Associate, Louisville Metro Council representative
- Nikola Rušinović – professor at the University of Louisville School of Medicine, the Independent State of Croatia's unofficial envoy to the Holy See during World War II
- James Speed – lecturer, U.S. attorney general under President Abraham Lincoln
- Eugenia Wang – professor with a primary focus in researching the genetic aspect of aging in humans
- Harold Wren – legal scholar and law school dean
- Roman Yampolskiy – computer scientist known for his work on artificial intelligence safety

== Notable athletic alumni ==
=== Football ===
==== Current NFL players ====
- Jaire Alexander – cornerback, Green Bay Packers
- Teddy Bridgewater (2011–2014) – Minnesota Vikings, New Orleans Saints, Denver Broncos Miami Dolphins quarterback
- Jamon Brown – offensive tackle, Green Bay Packers
- Preston Brown (2010–2013) – Buffalo Bills linebacker
- Lamar Jackson (2015–2018) – quarterback for Baltimore Ravens; NFL; 2016 Heisman Trophy winner
- DeVante Parker (2011–2014) – Miami Dolphins wide receiver
- Bilal Powell (2007–10) – New York Jets running back

==== Current CFL players ====
- Otis Floyd (1995–1998) – Hamilton Tiger-Cats linebacker
- Trent Guy – Toronto Argonauts slotback

==== Current AFL players ====
- Donovan Arp (1999–2000) – Austin Wranglers offensive/defensive lineman
- Kevin Gaines (1990–1993) – Grand Rapids Rampage defensive back

==== Current UFL players ====
- Brian Brohm (2004–2007) – Las Vegas Locomotives quarterback 2011–2012
- Ronnie Ghent (1997–2001) – Hartford Colonials tight end

==== Former pros ====
- David Akers (1992–1995) – San Francisco 49ers kicker; five-time Pro Bowl selection (2001, 2002, 2004, 2005, 2010)
- Bruce Armstrong (1983–1986) – former New England Patriots offensive lineman; played in the NFL for 14 seasons; six-time Pro Bowl selection (1990, 1991, 1994, 1995, 1996 and 1997); one of only 11 inducted into the Patriots Hall of Fame; one of only seven to have his number retired
- Deion Branch (2000–01) – New England Patriots wide receiver; Super Bowl XXXIX MVP with the New England Patriots, tied record for catches in a Super Bowl
- Ray Buchanan (1989–1991) – former Atlanta Falcons, Indianapolis Colts, and Oakland Raiders defensive back
- Curry Burns (1998–2002) – free agent safety
- Michael Bush (2003–2006) – Chicago Bears running back
- Mark Clayton (1979–1982) – former Miami Dolphins and Green Bay Packers wide receiver; five-time Pro Bowl selection (1984, 1985, 1986, 1988 and 1991)
- Harry Douglas (2003–2007) – Tennessee Titans wide receiver
- Elvis Dumervil (2002–2005) – Denver Broncos, Baltimore Ravens defensive end; tied the NCAA single-season sack record (24); first team All-American and the 2005 Bronko Nagurski Trophy winner as college football's Defensive Player of the Year; 2005 Ted Hendricks Award as college football's top defensive end
- Salem Ford (1914–1916) – former Louisville Brecks halfback
- Renardo Foster (2003–2006) – free agent offensive lineman
- William Gay (2003–2006) – Pittsburgh Steelers cornerback
- Antoine Harris (2002–2005) – free agent defensive back
- Nate Harris (2005–2006) – free agent linebacker
- Earl Heyman (2005–2009) – New Orleans Saints defensive tackle
- Ernest Givins (1984–1985) – former Houston Oilers and Jacksonville Jaguars wide receiver; two-time Pro Bowl selection (1990 and 1992)
- Ernie Green (1959–1962) – former Green Bay Packers and Cleveland Browns running back and fullback
- Jay Gruden (1985–1988) – former Arena Football League quarterback for the Tampa Bay Storm, led the team to four ArenaBowl championships; League MVP in 1992 and MVP of ArenaBowl VII; first quarterback inducted into the Arena Football Hall of Fame in 1998; head coach of the Washington Redskins; former head coach of the Orlando Predators, led the team to titles in ArenaBowls XII and XIII
- Tom Jackson (1970–1972) – former Denver Broncos linebacker; three-time Pro Bowl selection (1977–1979); analyst on ESPN's NFL GameDay; two-time Missouri Valley Conference player of the year (1971, 1972)
- Joe Jacoby (1977–1980) – former Washington Redskins offensive lineman; key member of "The Hogs"; member of Super Bowl XVII, Super Bowl XXII, and Super Bowl XXVI Championship teams; four-time Pro Bowl selection (1983–1986)
- Brandon Johnson (2002–2005) – Cincinnati Bengals linebacker
- Chris Johnson (2001–2002) – Oakland Raiders defensive back
- Joe Johnson (1990–1993) – former New Orleans Saints and Green Bay Packers defensive end; two-time Pro Bowl selection (1998 and 2000)
- Stefan LeFors (2000–05; played 2001–2004) – former quarterback with the Carolina Panthers in the NFL and the Edmonton Eskimos and Winnipeg Blue Bombers in the CFL; head high school football coach at the Christian Academy of Louisville
- Lenny Lyles (1954–1957) – drafted by the Baltimore Colts in the first round (11th overall) of the 1958 NFL Draft; one-time Pro Bowl selection; one of the first African American football players at the University of Louisville; often referred to as "the fastest man in football"
- Sam Madison (1993–1996) – former Miami Dolphins and New York Giants defensive back; four-time Pro Bowl selection (1999, 2000, 2001, and 2002)
- Frank Minnifield (1979–1982) – former Cleveland Browns defensive back; four-time Pro Bowl selection (1986–1989); co-creator of the "Dawg Pound"; led nation in kickoff returns in 1981 and punt returns in 1982
- Roman Oben (1991–1995) – offensive lineman
- Amobi Okoye (2003–2006) – Chicago Bears defensive lineman
- Richard Owens (1999–2003) – free agent tight end
- Chris Redman (1996–1999) – Atlanta Falcons quarterback; 1999 Johnny Unitas Golden Arm Award winner
- Kerry Rhodes (2001–2004) – Arizona Cardinals defensive back, 2005 NFL All-Rookie team
- Kolby Smith (2003–2006) – free agent running back
- Jason Spitz (2002–2005) – Jacksonville Jaguars offensive lineman
- Montavious Stanley (2002–2005) – free agent defensive tackle
- Howard Stevens – running back, Baltimore Colts, New Orleans Saints; member of Louisville Athletic Hall of Fame
- Johnny Unitas (1951–1954) – former Baltimore Colts quarterback; Pro Football Hall of Fame member, three-time NFL Most Valuable Player
- Dewayne White (2000–2002) – Detroit Lions defensive end
- Otis Wilson (1976–1979) – first team All-American defensive end; member of the Chicago Bears Super Bowl XX Championship team

=== Men's basketball ===
- Rakeem Buckles (2009–2012) – professional basketball player in the Israeli Basketball Premier League
- Jaylen Johnson (born 1996), basketball player for Hapoel Haifa of the Israeli Basketball Premier League
- Trey Lewis (2015–2016) – professional basketball player in the Israeli Basketball Premier League
- Mangok Mathiang (born 1992) – Australian-Sudanese basketball player for Hapoel Eilat of the Israeli Basketball Premier League
- Donovan Mitchell (2015–2017) – professional basketball player for the Utah Jazz (2017–2022), Cleveland Cavaliers (2022–present)
- Chinanu Onuaku (born 1996) – basketball player
- Kenny Payne (1985–1989) – professional basketball player for the Philadelphia 76ers (1989–1993), coach for the University of Louisville (2022–2024)
- Taqwa Pinero, formerly known as Taquan Dean (2003–2005) – professional basketball player for the Phoenix Suns (NBA Summer league 2008), Unicaja Málaga (2009–2010), Élan Béarnais Pau-Lacq-Orthez (2017–2019)
- Derek Smith (1979–1982) – professional basketball player for the Golden State Warriors (1982–1983), Los Angeles/San Diego Clippers (1983–1986), Sacramento Kings (1986–1989), Philadelphia 76ers (1989–1993), and Boston Celtics (1990–1991)
- Russ Smith – former NBA player, currently in the Israeli Basketball Premier League

==== All-Americans ====
(listed in chronological order)

- Bob Lochmueller (1949–1952)
- Charlie Tyra (1954–1957)
- Don Goldstein (1956–1959) – All-American, Pan American Games gold medalist
- Jack Turner (1958–1961)
- Wes Unseld (1965–1968) – three-time All-American; former member of the Baltimore/Washington Bullets; 5-time NBA All-Star; second person ever to win both NBA Rookie of the Year and NBA Most Valuable Player in the same season; named to the NBA's 50th Anniversary All-Time Team; inducted into the Naismith Memorial Basketball Hall of Fame in 1988
- Butch Beard (1966–1969)
- Jim Price (1969–1972)
- Junior Bridgeman (1972–1975) – All-American in 1975
- Allen Murphy (1972–1975)
- Phil Bond (1973–1976)
- Wesley Cox (1974–1977)
- Rick Wilson (1975–1978)
- Darrell Griffith (1976–1980) – 1980 John Wooden Award winner (player of the year) and Most Outstanding Player of the NCAA basketball tournament; former member of the Utah Jazz; 1981 NBA Rookie of the Year
- Lancaster Gordon (1981–1984)
- Pervis Ellison (1985–1989) – first freshman to be named Most Outstanding Player of the NCAA basketball tournament; first overall pick of the 1989 NBA Draft
- Clifford Rozier (1991–1994)
- DeJuan Wheat (1994–1997)
- Reece Gaines (2000–2003)
- Francisco García (2003–2005) – led team to 2005 Final Four; former member of Sacramento Kings; member of the Houston Rockets
- Terrence Williams (2005–009) – led team to back to back Elite 8s; former member of Houston Rockets; member of the Boston Celtics

=== Women's basketball ===
- Angel McCoughtry (2005–2009) – Big East Player of the Year and All-American in 2007, 2008, and 2009; led the Cardinals to the 2009 NCAA final; first overall pick in the 2009 WNBA draft by the Atlanta Dream; 2009 Rookie of the Year
- Shoni Schimmel (2010–2014) – led the Cardinals to the 2013 NCAA final; chosen eighth overall in the 2014 WNBA draft by the Dream

=== Baseball ===
- Zack Burdi – MLB pitcher in Arizona Diamondbacks organization
- Reid Detmers – MLB pitcher for the Los Angeles Angels
- Chris Dominguez – former MLB infielder and head coach for the Bellarmine Knights
- Adam Duvall – MLB player for the Atlanta Braves and formerly the San Francisco Giants and Cincinnati Reds; 2016 All-Star and 2016 Home Run Derby participant
- Drew Ellis – MLB infielder, Seattle Mariners
- Cody Ege – former MLB pitcher
- Adam Engel – MLB outfielder, Chicago White Sox
- Kyle Funkhouser – MLB pitcher, Detroit Tigers
- Chad Green – MLB pitcher, New York Yankees
- Sean Green (1997–2000) – former MLB pitcher
- Bryan Hoeing – MLB pitcher, Miami Marlins
- Zach Jackson, – former MLB pitcher
- Jarred Kelenic – MLB outfielder, Seattle Mariners
- Dean Kiekhefer – former MLB pitcher
- Matt Koch – MLB pitcher
- Fred Koster (1926–1928) – former MLB outfielder
- Trystan Magnuson – former MLB pitcher
- Justin Marks – former MLB pitcher
- Kyle McGrath – MLB pitcher
- Brendan McKay (2014–2017) – first baseman and pitcher, Tampa Bay Rays; consensus national college player of the year in 2017
- Corey Ray – MLB outfielder, Milwaukee Brewers
- Josh Rogers – MLB pitcher, Miami Marlins
- B. J. Rosenberg – former MLB pitcher
- Dalton Rushing – MLB catcher, Los Angeles Dodgers
- Will Smith – MLB catcher, Los Angeles Dodgers
- Nick Solak – MLB infielder, Texas Rangers
- Logan Wyatt – MLB first baseman, San Francisco Giants
- Tony Zych – former MLB pitcher

=== Track and field ===
- Kelley Bowman (2002–06) – two-time All-American high jumper; finished 3rd in nation in the high jump at 2006 NCAA National Championships with a UofL record of 6 feet, 1.25 inches; holds Kentucky high school girls' record (5 feet, 10.5 inches); won four consecutive KY state titles at Berea High School; had 4th best jump in the nation in 2000
- Wesley Korir (2006–2008) – multiple All-America in distance running; winner of the 2012 Boston Marathon; member of the Kenyan Parliament, 2013–2017

=== Other sports ===
- Adam Hadwin (2009) – PGA golfer, winner of 2017 Valspar Championship
- Scott Harrington – Indy car race driver, 1999 Indycar Rookie of the Year
- Denis Loktev (born 2000) – Israeli Olympic swimmer
- Denis Petrashov (born 2000) – Kyrgyzstani Olympic swimmer
- Shannon Smyth (2005–2008) – Republic of Ireland international soccer player

== Presidents of the University of Louisville ==
There have been 28 presidents and five interim presidents of what is (or was once a part of) the University of Louisville.

Since 2025, the 20th and current president is Gerry Bradley.

For the best maintained list of university presidents, see List of presidents of the University of Louisville.

== See also ==
- University of Louisville
- Louisville Cardinals
- Louisville Cardinal's Radio Affiliates
- Louisville Cardinals Conference Championships by Year
- List of people from the Louisville metropolitan area
