= Kee =

Kee or KEE may refer to:

== Business ==
- Kee Games, a former arcade game manufacturer
- Knowledge Engineering Environment, a frame-based development tool for expert systems

== Places ==
- Kee Scarp Formation, a geologic formation in Northwest Territories
- KEE, the IATA code for the Congolese Kelle Airport

== People ==
- Kinnda (born 1982), Kinnda Hamid, a Swedish artist and songwriter, also known as Kee
- Kee (surname), a surname romanized in Hokkien
- Kee Marcello (born 1960), Swedish guitarist
- Kee Chang Huang (1917–1998), professor at the University of Louisville
- Kee Thuan Chye (born 1954), Malaysian actor, dramatist, poet and journalist
- Kee MacFarlane (born 1947), director of Children's Institute International
- Kee Sloan (born 1955), the eleventh and current bishop of the Diocese of Alabama
- Kee Kim Swee (1863–?), Chinese nationality (Hainanese) who settled in Tawau, Sabah
- John P. Kee (born 1962), American gospel singer and pastor

== Educational institutions ==
- Kee Business College, the former name of a for-profit college with branches in Chesapeake and Newport News, Virginia
- Kee High School, an Allamakee County secondary school located in Lansing, Iowa, US

== Films ==
- Kee (film), an Indian Tamil-language film

== Others ==
- Kee Klamp, a structural pipe fitting commonly used in the construction of handrails and barriers
- Kee House (disambiguation)
