= Snitch =

Snitch may refer to:

- Informant

== Film and television ==
- Snitch (1998 film) or Monument Ave., an American crime drama directed by Ted Demme
- Snitch (2011 film) or Witness Insecurity, an American thriller starring Edward Furlong
- Snitch (film), a 2013 American crime drama starring Dwayne Johnson
- "Snitch" (Law & Order: Special Victims Unit), a 2007 episode
- "Snitch" (The Shield), a 2008 episode
- "Snitch" (Tower Prep), a 2010 episode

== Music ==
- "Snitch" (song), by Obie Trice, 2006
- "Snitch", a song by Netsky with Aloe Blacc, 2019

== Other uses ==
- Golden Snitch or Snitch, a ball in Quidditch in the Harry Potter series
- Snitch Newsweekly, a 2000–2005 American newspaper covering crime and police news
- Steve Snitch (born 1983), English rugby league footballer

== See also ==
- Little Snitch, a software firewall for Mac OS X
