= James Lewis (Indiana politician) =

American politician

Member of the Indiana Senate from the 45th district
- In office 1986–2010
- Succeeded by: Jim Smith

Personal details
- Born: December 26, 1930 Lincoln County, Kentucky
- Died: June 9, 2016 (aged 85) Charlestown, Indiana
- Party: Democratic
- Spouse: Anna Mae
- Occupation: Building contractor

James Albert "Jim" Lewis Jr. (December 26, 1930 – June 9, 2016) was a Democratic member of the Indiana Senate, representing the 45th District from 1986 until 2010. He earlier served from 1974 through 1978. Previously he was a member of the Indiana House of Representatives from 1970 through 1972. Lewis also served on the Charlestown City Council for eight years and on the Clark County, Indiana council for two years. He died in 2016.
