= Lynching of George Johnson, Squire Taylor, and Charles Davis =

Lynching of three Black men in Indiana, 1871

George Johnson, Squire Taylor, and Charles Davis, were three Black men who were killed in a spectacle lynching in 1871 in Charlestown, Indiana. All three men were lynched by a white mob for the murders of Cyrus Park, his wife and two of his children. The lynching was controversial at the time. While others supported the lynching, many questioned the guilt of the three men privately and publicly. Indiana's Governor, Conrad Baker, pushed the federal government to provide aid and assistance in suppressing illegal organizations and mob violence. In 2022, the Indiana Senate officially recognized the innocence of George Johnson, Squire Taylor, and Charles Davis in Senate Resolution 36.

== Lynching ==
A white mob lynched George Johnson, Squire Taylor, and Charles Davis, all Black men, in Charlestown, Clark County, Indiana, in 1871. The three men were accused of killing the family of Cyprus Park, a farmer who lived near Henryville, Indiana. A neighbor near the Parks family believed that he was also a target but managed to keep the assailants out of his home. The neighbor believed that the assailants were white. Even so, George Johnson, a Black man, was arrested on suspicion of committing the murders and was tortured until he confessed. He also gave out the names of two other Black men, Squire Taylor, and Charles Davis. These men were then arrested. The trial followed quite quickly. The grand jury declared the men not guilty based on the lack of evidence, but the men remained in custody and were sent to a Charlestown jail.

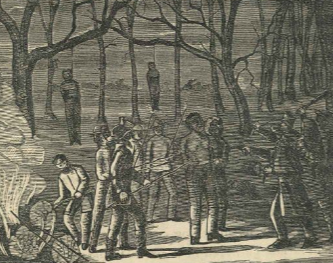
Sketch of disguised Clark County residents preparing to lynch Squire Taylor after lynching Johnson and Davis.

Soon after arrival, a white mob gathered and took the three men from the jail. The mob then hanged all three men and tortured Squire Taylor before he was killed. The guilt of the men in question was viewed as highly dubious by some at the time. Information about this spectacle lynching was released only a year later in a pamphlet titled Murder and Mob Law in Indiana by James Hiatt. The author decried the lack of proof of the Black men's guilt and acknowledged the overwhelming evidence of their innocence. No one was charged or arrested for the murder of these men even though the family came forward with names of suspects and filed a lawsuit against the sheriff involved.

The actions of the white mob led the Indiana governor at the time, Conrad Baker, to call for the suppression of illegal organizations. Referring to the Enforcement Act of 1870, adopted during Reconstruction, Baker proposed that the U.S. Federal government could be asked to intervene to stop the actions of mobs that terrorized Black people. The Indiana government, however, did not follow through on that proposal and mob violence continued.

Information about the murdered men is not available in the public historical record otherwise. In Indiana, between 1877 and 1950, there were at least eighteen Black people lynched.

== Memorialization ==
On February 26, 2022, the Indiana Senate officially recognized the innocence of George Johnson, Squire Taylor, and Charles Davis in Senate Resolution 36. Senator Chris Garten has since expressed interest in installing a historical marker to commemorate the event, although one has yet to be created.
