= Dorothy J. Phillips =

American chemist

Dorothy Jean Phillips
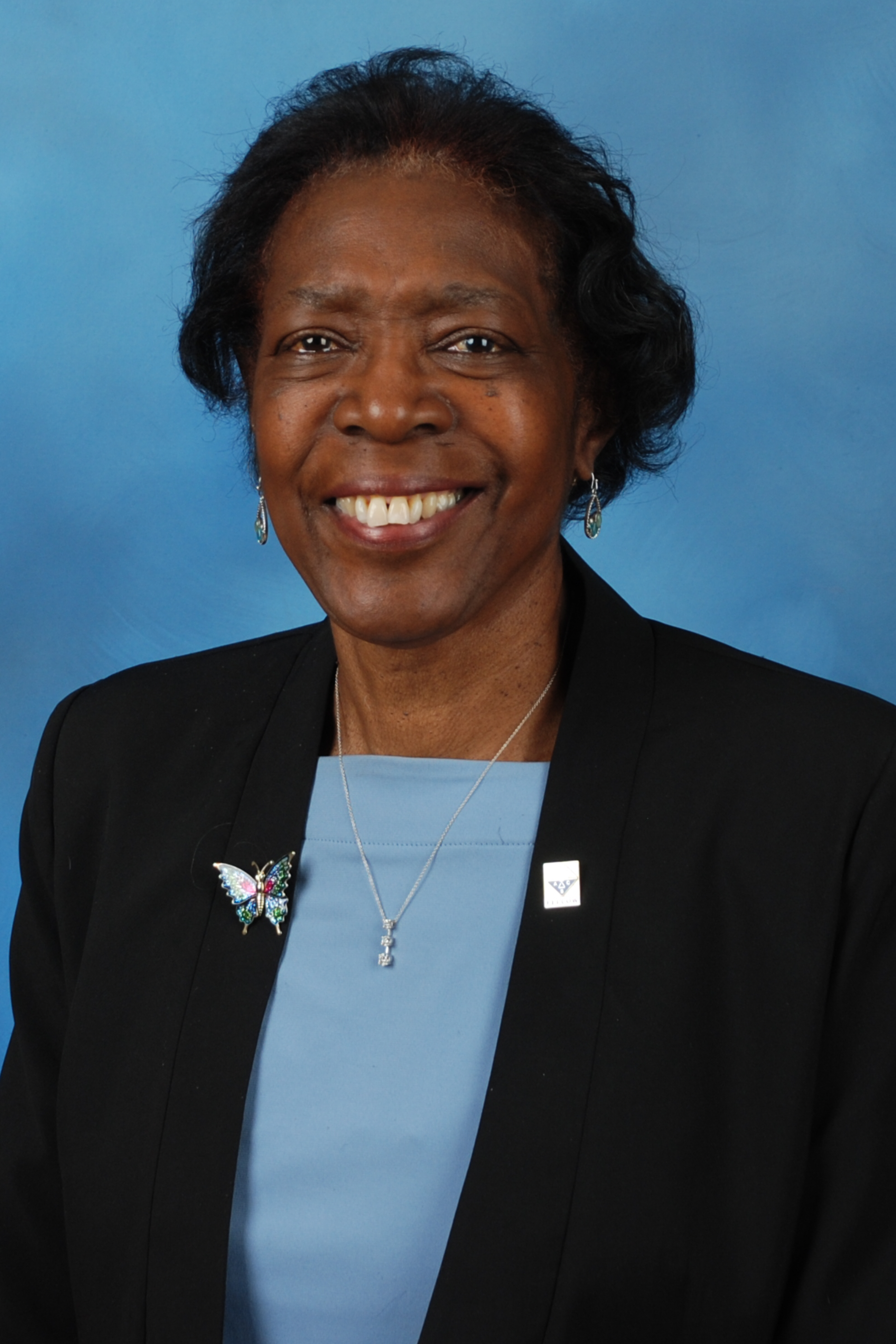
- Dorothy J. Phillips, 2018
- Born: July 27, 1945 (age 81); Nashville
- Education: Tennessee State University; University of Cincinnati; Vanderbilt University
- Known for: Industrial chemistry Bioseparation
- Scientific career
- Workplaces: Dow Chemical Company; Waters Corporation

Dorothy Jean Phillips (née Wingfield) (born July 27, 1945) is an American chemist and 2025 President of the American Chemical Society. She worked on circular dichroism and bioseparation. In 1967, Phillips was the first African-American woman to complete a bachelor's degree at Vanderbilt University. She later earned her doctorate in biochemistry in 1979 from the University of Cincinnati.

== Early life and education ==
Phillips grew up in segregation in the southern United States. She was one of eight children. Her father, Reverend Robert Cam Wingfield, worked as a porter for the Greyhound Bus station before attending classes at the American Baptist Theological Seminary to become a Baptist minister. Her mother, Rebecca Cooper Wingfield, did occasional domestic work. As a young girl the only white people Phillips knew were those who had employed her mother.

Her parents were very supportive of her education, and attended local meetings of the Negro Parent Teachers Association. The Wingfields became more active with the civil rights movement after the Rosa Parks bus boycott in 1956. Her brother was part of the Nashville sit-ins and her family were one of the first to integrate into Nashville. Phillips attended a National Science Foundation summer school for African-American students, which inspired her to study chemistry. She and her boyfriend took part in a statewide mathematics competition 'for colored students'. She eventually majored in chemistry at Tennessee State University, but transferred to Vanderbilt University in 1966.

While Phillips originally intended to study medicine, she was discouraged by her advisor who believed she would not be able to have a family and attend medical school. She pledged to the Alpha Kappa Alpha sorority. She studied chemistry at Vanderbilt University, where she was the first African-American woman to earn a Bachelor of Arts in 1967. Attending Vanderbilt University was the first time Phillips had white classmates and professors. After graduating, Phillips worked in psycho-pharmaceutical research. She completed her doctoral studies at the University of Cincinnati, and, again, was the first African-American woman in Cincinnati to earn a PhD in biochemistry.

In 1973 the joined the American Chemical Society. She worked on the R17 virus, using circular dichroism and electron paramagnetic resonance to understand the conformation of the viral protein. Whilst researching the R17 virus, Phillips read about the work of Patrick Oriel at Dow Chemical Company, and decided to apply.

== Career ==
After graduating, Phillips joined the Dow Chemical Company as a bench scientist. She developed circular dichroism and began to work on antibiotics and herbicides. At Dow Chemical Company Phillips helped students from Michigan State University to analyse the antibiotics in animal feed. She established how they might impact animal growth. She is responsible for several patents in the area, including one to improve lactation and another to improve feed utilisation.

Phillips joined the Waters Corporation in 1984, where she worked in research and development until 1996. At Waters Corporation Phillips was a member of the Chemical Research and Development department, developing chromatography packing materials and bioseparations. Under her leadership the team developed the AccellPlus exchange packings, which could be used to separate proteins. She began to consult the biotechnology company Millipore Corp., travelling the world to talk about the work of the Waters Corporation. Her work expanded to include high-performance liquid chromatography. Phillips also investigated small molecules, including the drug sildenafil. She served as Clinical Marketing Director and Strategic Marketing Director. She was involved with the development of the Waters Corporation Symmetry columns and Oasis cartridges. At both the Dow Chemical Company and Waters Corporation, Phillips moved from research development to business management. After an almost thirty-year career, Phillips retired from the Waters Corporation in 2013 s Director of Strategic Marketing . Phillips has been elected the American Chemical Society president in 2025 and immediate past president in 2026. A total of 11,428 votes were cast for president-elect. With 6,653 votes, Phillips won the president-elect race against Florian J. Schattenmann, chief technology officer and vice president of research and development and innovation at Cargill, who received 4,775 votes. Phillips became the first Black woman to serve as president of the American Chemical Society in 2025.

=== Academic service ===
In 1990 Phillips became involved with the American Chemical Society Northeastern Section. She was involved with the American Chemical Society Project SEED, an initiative which allows high school students from disadvantaged backgrounds to complete summer placements in research laboratories. As a candidate in 2013 for the position of director-at-Large for the American Chemical Society, Phillips stated that if she were elected to the position, she would aim to address two issues: global chemistry enterprise and chemical safety. In 2013 Phillips was appointed director-at-large of the American Chemical Society. Since 2014, Phillips has served as the American Chemical Society board liaison for the society's Science and Human Rights program. This program monitors the cases of scientists worldwide whose rights have been abridged. She was re-elected as director-at-Large in 2016, and seeks to use her tenure to improve their 'globalization and diversity'. In 2017 Vanderbilt University created two faculty fellowships in her honour. The inaugural fellowship holder was Renã A. S. Robinson. In the fall of 2019, Philips was re-elected to serve a third term in 2020 on the board of directors for the American Chemical Society.

=== Awards and honours ===
Phillips' awards and honours include;

- 1994 University of Cincinnati Distinguished Alumni
- 2004 American Chemical Society Nashville Section Salute to Excellence Award
- 2006 Vanderbilt University Unsung Heroine Award
- 2006 American Chemical Society Northeastern Section Henry A. Hill Award
- 2008 American Chemical Society Santa Clara Valley Section Shirley B. Radding Award
- 2008 Waters Corporation Leadership Award for Outstanding Contributions
- 2008 Vanderbilt University Dr. Dorothy Wingfield Phillips Award for Leadership
- 2010 Fellow of the American Chemical Society
- 2011 New England Institute of Chemists Distinguished Chemist Award
- 2015 Vanderbilt University Dr. Dorothy J. Wingfield Phillips Endowed Chair
- 2019 Vanderbilt University Member of the inaugural class of Vanderbilt Trailblazers
- 2020 National Organization for the Professional Advancement of Black Chemists and Chemical Engineers Lifetime Achievement Award.

=== Personal life ===
Phillips was married two weeks after graduating from Vanderbilt University. Her brother, Robert C. Wingfield, serves as director of the Fisk Community Environmental Toxics Awareness and Sustainability Program. She has two children, Anthony and Crystal, and a step-daughter called Vickie.
