= Renã A. S. Robinson =

Chemist

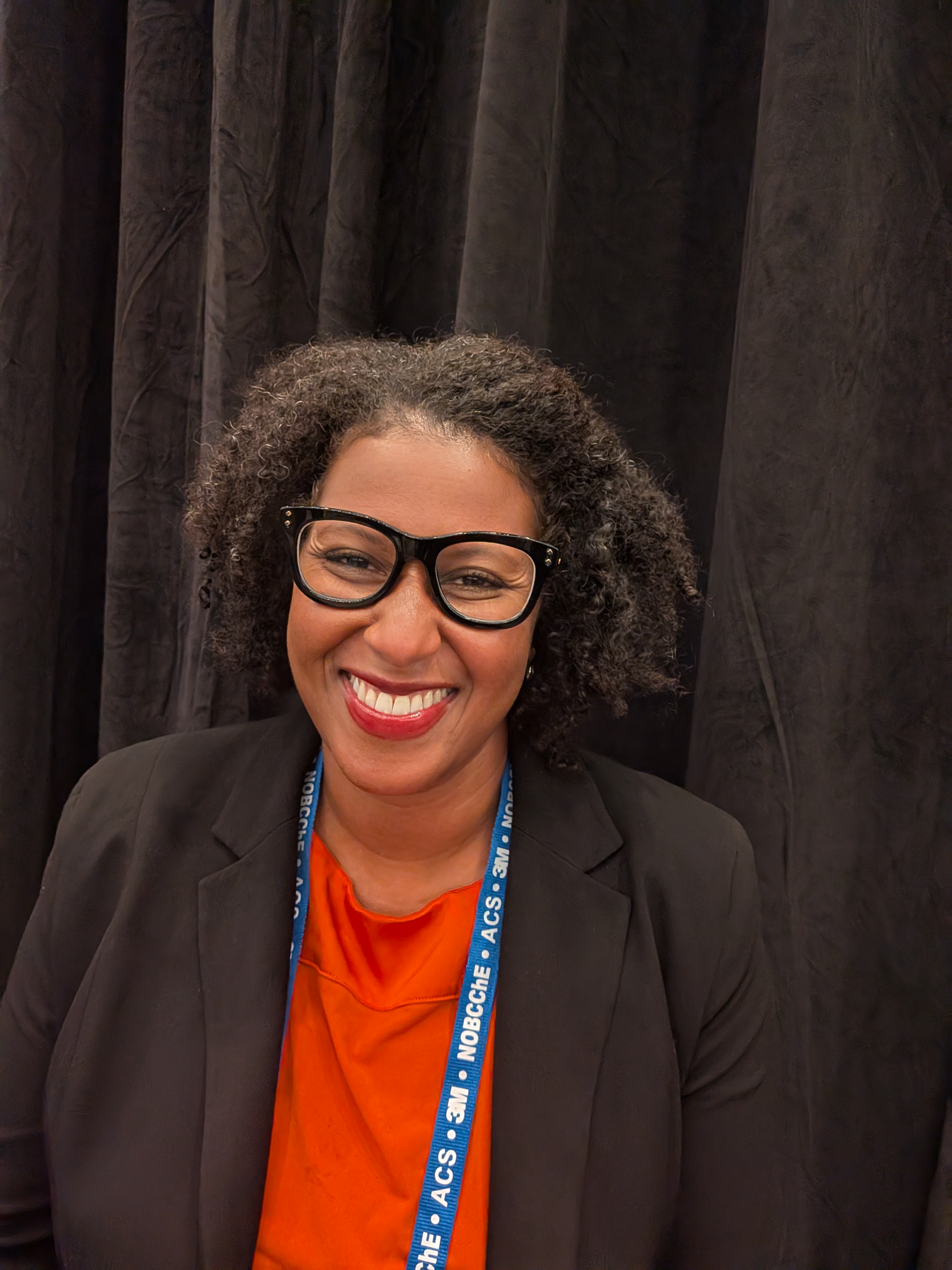
- Born: Rena A. Sowell; Louisville, Kentucky, U.S.
- Education: University of Louisville, Indiana University
- Awards: Pittsburgh Conference Achievement Award 2017 Talented Twelve Award 2016 Emerging Investigator 2016
- Scientific career
- Fields: Analytical chemistry, Proteomics
- Workplaces: Vanderbilt University, University of Pittsburgh
- Doctoral advisor: David E. Clemmer

Renã A. S. Robinson is a professor and the Dorothy J. Wingfield Phillips Chair in the department of chemistry at the Vanderbilt University, where she is the principal investigator of the RASR Laboratory.

Robinson is recognized as an emerging leader in proteomics and the study of Alzheimer's disease, sepsis, and aging. She has developed a novel multiplexing strategy for quantitative proteomics called cPILOT. She has received a number of awards, including the 2017 Pittsburgh Conference Achievement Award.

== Education and early research ==
Born Rena A. Sowell, Renã A. S. Robinson is married and has two children. Robinson completed her B.S. in chemistry at the University of Louisville in 2000. She received her Ph.D. in Analytical Chemistry in 2007 from Indiana University Bloomington where she worked with David E. Clemmer. While still a Ph.D. student, she pioneered work that combined techniques for ion-mobility spectrometry and time-of-flight mass spectrometry to identify proteins in fruit flies and study aging. These proteomics methods were used to identify over 1,600 proteins. Results indicated connections between metabolic and defense-response proteins and aging.

Robinson then worked with Allan Butterfield at the University of Kentucky, receiving two postdoctoral fellowships: the Lyman T. Johnson fellowship and the UNCF/Merck Postdoctoral Fellowship. With Butterfield, she used proteomics methods to study Alzheimer's disease in animals and humans. Her research was important in the laboratory's discovery that free radical oxidative stress affects Alzheimer's brains.

== Scientific career ==
External videos
- "Renã Robinson, Proteomics Provocateur", Chemical & Engineering News

From 2009 to 2017, Robinson was an assistant professor in the department of chemistry at the University of Pittsburgh, and a faculty member of the Biomedical Mass Spectrometry Center at the University of Pittsburgh School of Medicine and the University of Pittsburgh Alzheimer Disease Research Center. At the end of 2017, she joined Vanderbilt University where she now leads the RASR Laboratory as an associate professor of chemistry, in the department of chemistry, department of neurology and faculty member of the department of chemical biology, and Vanderbilt Memory & Alzheimer's Center.

Robinson's research focuses on how changes in the brain and the rest of the body are related in neurodegenerative diseases such as Alzheimer's. Of particular interest is the molecular basis of racial disparities in age-related diseases whereby certain populations of people have higher incidences and risk of disease. For example, Black and Hispanic populations develop Alzheimer's at a rate two to three times higher than the majority of the US population. While many factors can contribute to health disparities, Robinson uses a variety of high-throughput analytical methodologies and novel proteomics approaches to determine if molecular differences can help explain disparities in Alzheimer's disease and sepsis. One of the questions she studies is whether changes external to the brain, such as oxidative stress or metabolic alterations, occur before or after changes within the brain.

Proteins are involved in major functions throughout the body, including communication between cells. Changes in protein function, or in expression level of a protein, may cascade from one protein to another throughout a system. Protein behavior changes as people age, but scientists do not yet know why: is it a result of incremental damage over time, from oxidative stressors or other causes; or is there some inherent signal that triggers changes with age, and if so, what purpose does it serve? By studying immunosenescence, Robinson hopes to relate early changes in the immune system to changes in molecular systems and the development of Alzheimer's and other age-related diseases.

Robinson continues to develop novel equipment and techniques for Ion-mobility spectrometry (IMS) and mass spectrometry (MS). She develops new proteomics techniques which are used to study the molecular basis of aging throughout the body, particularly the production of Amyloid precursor proteins and Amyloid beta peptides in organs beyond the central nervous system. Robinson has developed a novel multiplexing strategy for quantitative proteomics called "combined precursor isotopic labeling and isobaric tagging" or cPILOT, that can examine 12 or 16 samples at a time. By replacing specific precursor atoms by their isotope, monitoring reactions, and tracking the passage of an isotope within the body, Robinson identifies proteins that have been modified. Better understanding the changes that take place in Alzheimer's disease may lead to the development of new treatments.

Dr. Robinson is the current president of the National Organization for the Professional Advancement of Black Chemists and Chemical Engineers.

== Public science and mentorship ==
In addition to her dedication to improving human health through scientific research, Robinson also focuses on providing professional and scientific development activities for undergraduates, graduate students, and postdoctoral researches as well as engaging in community outreach activities for K through 12 students. Robinson was the Associate Director of Outreach, Recruitment and Education at the University of Pittsburgh, Alzheimer's Disease Research Center and has continued to provide mentorship within and outside her academic lab at Vanderbilt. As a Vanderbilt Global Voices Fellow, Robinson continues to build public awareness for her body of work related to racial and ethnic disparities in Alzheimer's disease as well as risk factors impacting the disproportionate effect of COVID-19 in communities of color in the USA.

== Select publications ==
- Stepler KE, Robinson RAS (2019). "The Potential of 'Omics to Link Lipid Metabolism and Genetic and Comorbidity Risk Factors of Alzheimer's Disease in African Americans". Reviews on Biomarker Studies in Psychiatric and Neurodegenerative Disorders. Advances in Experimental Medicine and Biology. Vol. 1118. pp. 1–28. doi:10.1007/978-3-030-05542-4_1. ISBN 978-3-030-05541-7. PMC 9000904. PMID 30747415. S2CID 73443710.
- Evans, Adam R.; Gu, Liqing; Guerrero, Rodolfo; Robinson, Renã A. S. (October 2015). "Global cPILOT analysis of the APP/PS-1 mouse liver proteome". Proteomics: Clinical Applications. 9 (9–10): 872–884. doi:10.1002/prca.201400149. PMID 25620666. S2CID 24483426.
- Cao, Zhiyun; Yende, Sachin; Kellum, John A.; Angus, Derek C.; Robinson, Renã A. S. (7 February 2014). "Proteomics Reveals Age-Related Differences in the Host Immune Response to Sepsis". Journal of Proteome Research. 13 (2): 422–432. doi:10.1021/pr400814s. PMC 3976438. PMID 24266763.
- Sowell, Renã A.; Hersberger, Katherine E.; Kaufman, Thomas C.; Clemmer, David E. (September 2007). "Examining the Proteome of Drosophila Across Organism Lifespan". Journal of Proteome Research. 6 (9): 3637–3647. doi:10.1021/pr070224h. PMID 17696518.

== Awards ==
- 2024 Power List - Human Health Heroes, Analytical Scientist
- 2023 Power List - Mentors and Educators, Analytical Scientist
- 2019, Vanderbilt Global Voices Fellowship (formerly the Chancellor's Public Voices Fellowship), from Vanderbilt University
- 2019, Margaret Cuninggim Mentoring Award, from Vanderbilt University
- 2017, Pittsburgh Conference Achievement Award, from Pittcon and the Society for Analytical Chemists of Pittsburgh (SACP).
- 2016, Women Of Excellence Award, New Pittsburgh Courier
- 2016, Talented Twelve Award, from Chemical and Engineering News
- 2016, Emerging Investigator, from Analyst
- 2016, Young Investigator, from Analytical and Bioanalytical Chemistry
- 2015, ASMS Emerging Investigator, from Journal of the American Society for Mass Spectrometry
