= Kee House =

Kee House may refer to:

- Kee House (Palo Alto, California), listed on the National Register of Historic Places
- Kee House (Chandler, Oklahoma)

== See also ==
- Key House, a historic house in Washington, D.C.
