= Michael Jackman =

American poet

Michael Jackman (born December 26, 1956) is an American columnist, poet, essayist, fiction writer, and college professor.

== Life ==
Michael Jackman was born and raised in Queens, New York and attended Belmont University. In 1992, he moved to Louisville, Kentucky to attend University of Louisville where he studied under poet Jeffrey Skinner and fiction writer Sena Naslund. From 1992 to 2002, he taught at University of Louisville both while in this Master's and PhD programs as well as afterwards. He began teaching at Indiana University Southeast in 2005 as a Visiting Lecturer and is currently Senior Lecturer in Writing. He also served as Expository Coach at Spalding University's MFA Program in Spring 2010.

== Work ==
Jackman is currently an editorial consultant for Indiana University Southeast Alumni Magazine and a Contributing editor to New Southerner Magazine. He previously served on the executive committee of the American Jewish Press Association as well as the board of InKY, which runs the InKY Reading Series. He also served as an editor for Techrepublic.com, now owned by CNET and wrote many articles for the site. In addition to TechRepublic.com, in 1999 Jackman served as The Courier-Journal's first Web editor.

His work has appeared in many journals and magazines, including in New Southerner Magazine, Scribblers on the Roof, The Merton Seasonal, The Louisville Review, Poetica, and Tea: A Magazine, just to name a few, and read for various book festivals.

His journalistic work has appeared in publications such as Louisville Magazine, The Courier-Journal, Louisville Eccentric Observer, Business Communication Quarterly, Kentucky Living, Jewish Advocate, Jewish Independent and Snitch Newsweekly among many others including publications for the University of Louisville. He has also written for major websites like a monthly column for The Auto Channel and several articles for CIO, a tech news magazine and web site.

He has also had stories run on various public radio stations and shows as The Savvy Traveler on NPR as well as stories on stations WFPK, WFPL, WMKY, WUKY, and WKMS and on other public radio stations through Public Radio Exchange. He has performed his stories on folk singer John Gage's Kentucky Homefront radio show on WFPK and has written the script for one Kentucky Homefront episode,

Jackman founded the Writer's Workshop Project (WWP) in 2006, a monthly writing workshop in Louisville, Kentucky to fill "a gap between expensive college programs and workshops and grassroots workshops or solo writing efforts". He continues to direct the WWP, which also hosts community and social events.

== Awards ==
Jackman was the recipient of the Louisville Society of Professional Journalists Award of Merit in 2005 for his column "Technicalities." He has also won and been nominated for various teaching awards, including Distinguished Teaching Award numerous times, TLC Committee for Freshman Retention, in 1993 and has been nominated for FACET (Faculty Colloquium on Excellence in Teaching).
