= Jim Smith (Indiana politician) =

American politician

Member of the Indiana Senate from the 45th district
- In office 2010–2018
- Preceded by: James Lewis
- Succeeded by: Chris Garten

Personal details
- Born: Charlestown, Indiana, U.S.
- Party: Republican
- Spouse: Brenda Faye
- Education: University of Louisville (BA, MBA)

Jim C. Smith is an American politician who served as a member of the Indiana Senate from 2010 to 2018. He attended the University of Louisville and was a member of the Clark County Council before being elected to the Indiana Senate. Smith was a sponsor of the bill to eliminate Indiana's estate tax. In 2017, Smith announced that he would not be running for re-election in the 2018 election. He was succeeded by Chris Garten.
