= Nina Payne =

American dancer

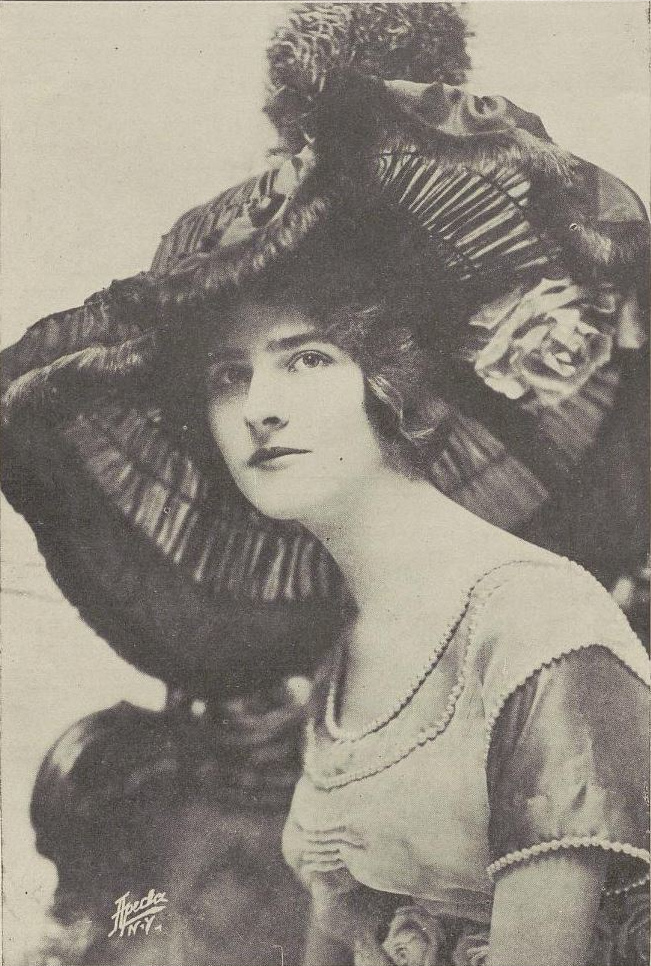
- Nina Payne, from a 1915 publication
- Born: November 15, 1890; Charlestown, Indiana, U.S.
- Died: 1971 (aged 80–81); New York, New York, U.S.
- Other names: Nina Dibble, Nina Bostwick, Nina Isbell
- Occupations: Dancer, vaudeville performer

Nina L. Payne Dibble Bostwick Isbell (November 15, 1890 – 1971) was an American dancer, singer, and vaudeville performer. She danced at the Folies Bergère in Paris, and was known for her "Cubist and Dadaist" costumes and dancing.

== Early life and education ==
Payne was born in Charlestown, Indiana, and raised in Seattle, the daughter of Leslie A. Payne and Emma N. Lutz Payne. She attended Broadway High School, but left after three years to begin her stage career. Her mother traveled with her, and her cousin Catherine Payne accompanied her as musical director.

== Career ==
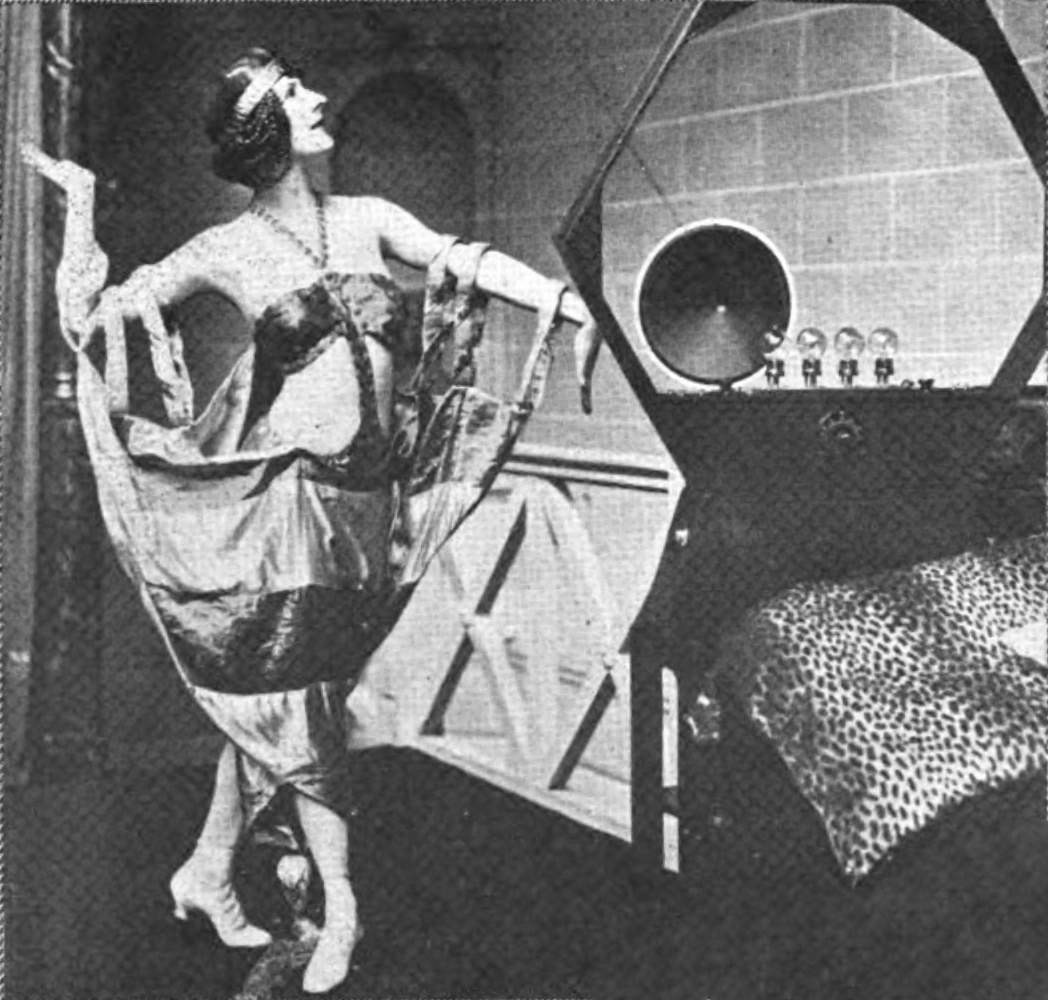
Nina Payne in 1922, in a dance pose

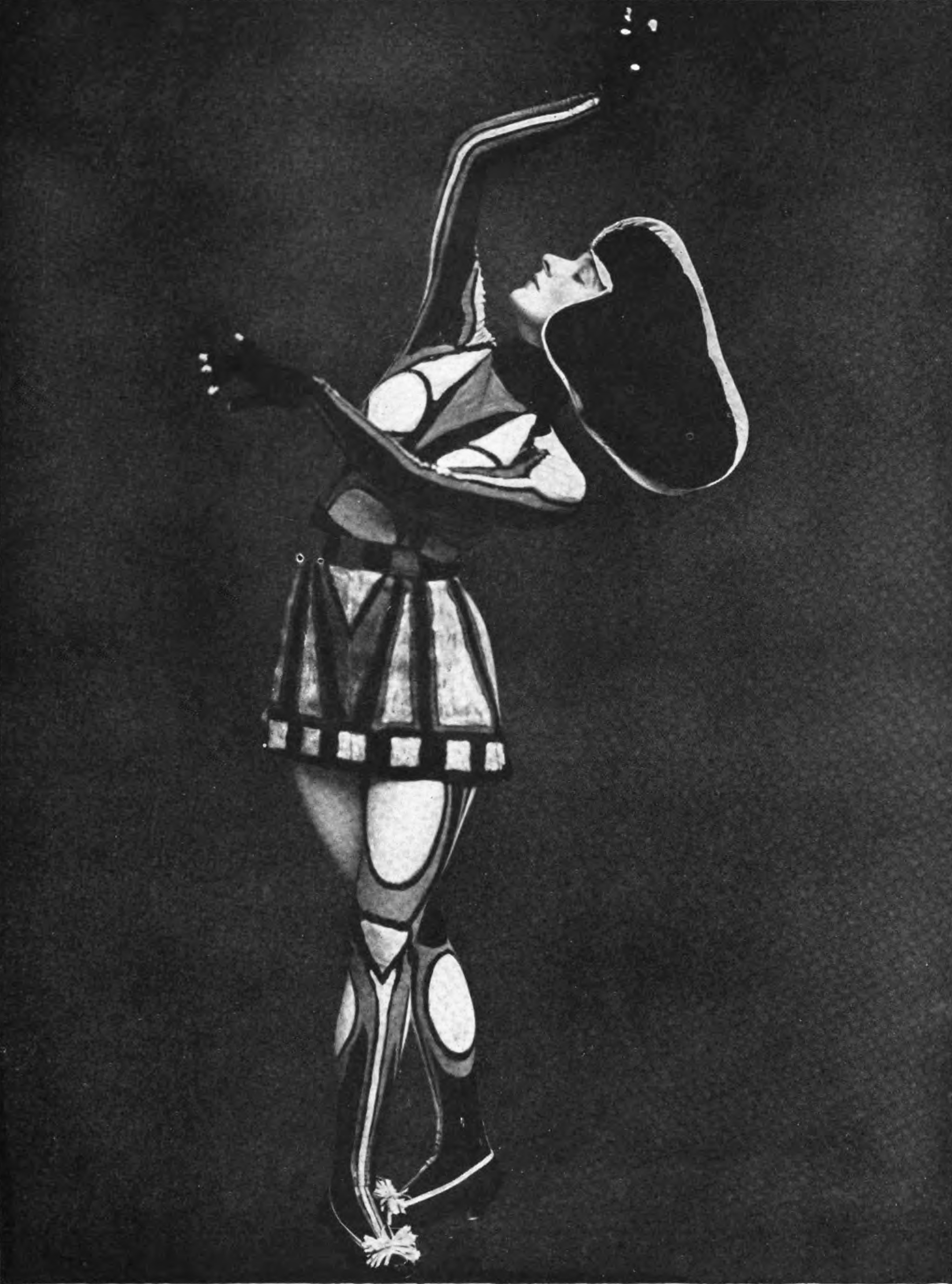
Nina Payne, 1916, Ira L. Hill

Payne was a dancer and a singer. She made headlines when she set fire to her gown and hair with a candle, during a 1910 performance in New York City. In the 1920s she danced at the Folies Bergère in Paris, and toured Europe. "Paris's Most Sensational Dancer is an American!" declared one 1922 newspaper headline.

She was known for her elaborate and unusual costumes, sometimes with Cubist or Dada influences, and her dances inspired by Egypt, jazz, and technology. Fellow American vaudeville veteran Holland Robinson designed gowns and sets for Payne's Paris shows. Some of her costumes and moves were considered "shocking" or scandalous by American critics. One costume, based on a newspaper cartoon, was painted onto her body.

== Personal life ==
Payne married Merritt Z. Dibble in 1917; they later divorced. She married businessman Charles A. Bostwick in 1930. He died in 1937. She married a third time in 1941, to Frank Genovar Isbell. She died in 1971, at the age of 80, in New York City.
