= Charlestown, Indiana =

- City
- City of Charlestown
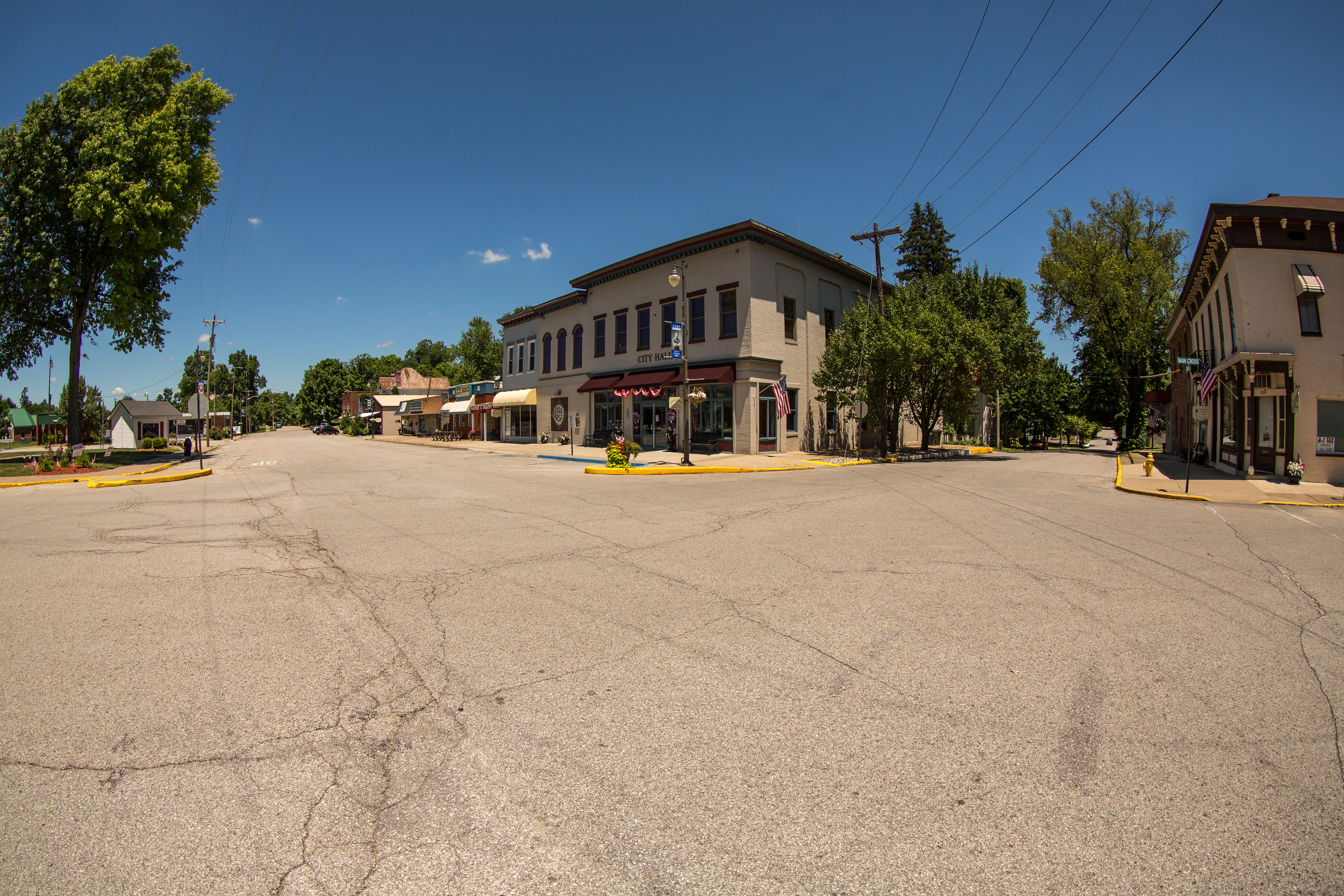

- Flag Logo

- Location of Charlestown in Clark County, Indiana.
- Coordinates: 38°25′25″N 85°38′52″W
- Country: United States
- State: Indiana
- County: Clark
- Townships: Charlestown, Union

Government
  - Mayor: Treva Hodges (D) 2020–present

Area
  - Total: 11.49 sq mi (29.75 km^{2})
  - Land: 11.45 sq mi (29.65 km^{2})
  - Water: 0.039 sq mi (0.10 km^{2})
- Elevation: 600 ft (180 m)

Population (2020)
  - Total: 7,775
  - Density: 679.2/sq mi (262.24/km^{2})
- Time zone: UTC-5 (EST)
  - Summer (DST): UTC-4 (EDT)
- ZIP code: 47111
- Area codes: 812 & 930
- FIPS code: 18-12124
- GNIS feature ID: 2393805
- Website: www.cityofcharlestown.com

Charlestown is a city located within Charlestown and Utica Townships, Clark County, Indiana, United States. The population was 7,775 at the 2020 census.

== History ==
=== Early history and Founding ===
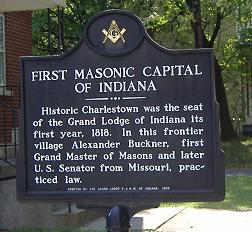
Marker denoting first Grand Lodge in Indiana

Charlestown was established in 1808, named after one of its surveyors, Charles Beggs, upon 300 acres (1.2 km^{2}), of which 3 acres (12,000 m^{2}) was designated for a town square. It was established one mile (1.6 km) northeast of Springville, and was responsible for Springville's demise.

Milling was important to the town, as the first mill was built in the area, on Fourteen Mile Creek, in 1804. This mill would be abandoned when John Work built a mill by use of a tunnel in 1814. Today, that mill is part of the Tunnel Mill Scout Reservation.

=== 19th Century ===
From 1811 to 1878 Charlestown was the county seat of Clark County, but as Jeffersonville had surpassed it economically, the county seat reverted to Jeffersonville in 1878.

In 1818, the first Grand Lodge of Free & Accepted Masons in Indiana met in Charlestown, due to Jonathan Jennings' influence.

=== Lynching ===
In 1871, three black Charlestown residents were lynched for the murders of local farmer, Cyrus Park, along with his family. Park's two daughters were found on the brink of death alongside the dismembered corpses of Park, his wife, and his son. Park's neighbor claimed to have letters that park had received from a "high-profile" member of the community which threatened Park's life if he did not leave Charlestown. The night Park's neighbor made this testimony, he fought off a group of attackers, who he later described as, Park's murderers and "definitely white." Despite this, Park's neighbor was ignored. A manhunt had already commenced for George Johnson, a black Charlestown man known locally for his vagrancy.

Upon capture, Johnson was quickly forced into confessing through harassment and torture, implicating Squire Taylor and Charles Davis, two other black Charlestown residents in his confession as well. After being arrested, all three men were found not guilty, but were ordered to be held in the Charlestown jail. Upon arriving, the men were met by a crowd of local community members in Ku Klux Klan disguises. Johnson, Taylor, and Davis were drug out of the jail, miles away into the woods where they would be lynched. The men's remains were carted back into town and are buried in the Charlestown cemetery. The cruel treatment of the three men was very controversial, leading to a lawsuit between the Sheriff and the victims' families. Blaming the event on the KKK and mob violence, Indiana's Governor Conrad Baker campaigned for the federal government to provide aid and assistance in suppressing illegal organizations and mob violence.

In 2022, the Indiana State Senate officially recognized the innocence of the victims. Senator Chris Garten and Mayor Treva Hodges have both expressed interest in erecting a historical marker memorializing the event.

=== 20th & 21st Century ===
In 1940 the population of Charlestown was 900, but it swelled to 13,400 due to the building and operation of the Indiana Army Ammunition Plant (INAAP). This created a housing problem, as chicken, wood, and wash houses had to house all the new residents who flocked to the area for the jobs created by the INAAP. Additional problems caused by the rapid influx of new residents were improper sanitation at restaurants, inefficient sewers, gambling, panhandling, and diseases such as typhoid and malaria.

In 2014, the city announced they would be applying for a grant to redevelop Pleasant Ridge Subdivision, an impoverished area within the city. Some residents of the Pleasant Ridge Subdivision formed an association to fight against demolishing their homes via eminent domain. The City Council did not call for a vote on the issue and the grant issue failed. Starting in 2016, the city was accused of using excessive fines against homeowners in the subdivision in order to force them to sell to a private developer.

== Geography ==
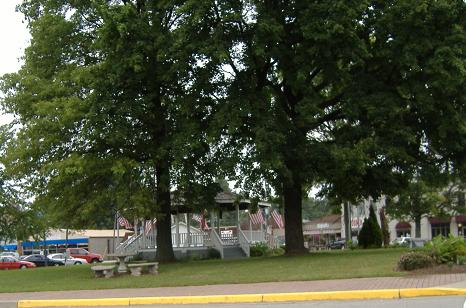
Charlestown town square

According to the 2010 census, Charlestown has a total area of 11.489 square miles (29.76 km^{2}), of which 11.45 square miles (29.66 km^{2}) (or 99.66%) is land and 0.039 square miles (0.10 km^{2}) (or 0.34%) is water.

== Demographics ==
Historical population
Census	Pop.	Note	%±
1850	250		—
1870	2,204		—
1880	1,103		−50.0%
1890	888		−19.5%
1900	915		3.0%
1910	864		−5.6%
1920	820		−5.1%
1930	859		4.8%
1940	939		9.3%
1950	4,785		409.6%
1960	5,726		19.7%
1970	5,933		3.6%
1980	5,596		−5.7%
1990	5,889		5.2%
2000	5,993		1.8%
2010	7,585		26.6%
2020	7,775		2.5%
U.S. Decennial Census

=== 2020 census ===
As of the 2020 census, Charlestown had a population of 7,775. The median age was 38.2 years. 25.0% of residents were under the age of 18 and 14.3% of residents were 65 years of age or older. For every 100 females there were 89.9 males, and for every 100 females age 18 and over there were 87.7 males age 18 and over.

96.0% of residents lived in urban areas, while 4.0% lived in rural areas.

There were 3,008 households in Charlestown, of which 35.5% had children under the age of 18 living in them. Of all households, 45.6% were married-couple households, 15.8% were households with a male householder and no spouse or partner present, and 29.7% were households with a female householder and no spouse or partner present. About 25.1% of all households were made up of individuals and 10.4% had someone living alone who was 65 years of age or older.

There were 3,227 housing units, of which 6.8% were vacant, at an average density of 281.8 per square mile (108.8/km^{2}). The population density was 679.2 inhabitants per square mile (262.2/km^{2}). The homeowner vacancy rate was 1.0% and the rental vacancy rate was 6.4%.

Racial composition as of the 2020 census
Race	Number	Percent
White	6,537	84.1%
Black or African American	216	2.8%
American Indian and Alaska Native	40	0.5%
Asian	63	0.8%
Native Hawaiian and Other Pacific Islander	4	0.1%
Some other race	285	3.7%
Two or more races	630	8.1%
Hispanic or Latino (of any race)	577	7.4%

=== 2010 census ===
As of the census of 2010, there were 7,585 people, 2,884 households, and 2,034 families residing in the city. The population density was 662.4 inhabitants per square mile (255.8/km^{2}). There were 3,169 housing units at an average density of 276.8 per square mile (106.9/km^{2}). The racial makeup of the city was 89.9% White, 2.1% African American, 0.3% Native American, 0.3% Asian, 5.3% from other races, and 2.1% from two or more races. Hispanic or Latino of any race were 8.3% of the population.

There were 2,884 households, of which 39.7% had children under the age of 18 living with them, 46.7% were married couples living together, 17.9% had a female householder with no husband present, 5.9% had a male householder with no wife present, and 29.5% were non-families. 24.3% of all households were made up of individuals, and 9.4% had someone living alone who was 65 years of age or older. The average household size was 2.63 and the average family size was 3.09.

The median age in the city was 35.2 years. 28.4% of residents were under the age of 18; 8.8% were between the ages of 18 and 24; 27.5% were from 25 to 44; 24.2% were from 45 to 64; and 11.2% were 65 years of age or older. The gender makeup of the city was 47.5% male and 52.5% female.

=== 2000 census ===
As of the census of 2000, there were 5,993 people, 2,341 households, and 1,615 families residing in the city. The population density was 2,570.0 inhabitants per square mile (992.3/km^{2}). There were 2,489 housing units at an average density of 1,067.4 per square mile (412.1/km^{2}). The racial makeup of the city was 92.91% White, 2.47% African American, 0.27% Native American, 0.17% Asian, 0.07% Pacific Islander, 2.77% from other races, and 1.35% from two or more races. Hispanic or Latino of any race were 5.32% of the population.

There were 2,341 households, out of which 37.0% had children under the age of 18 living with them, 45.9% were married couples living together, 18.5% had a female householder with no husband present, and 31.0% were non-families. 26.4% of all households were made up of individuals, and 9.9% had someone living alone who was 65 years of age or older. The average household size was 2.56 and the average family size was 3.03.

In the city, the population was spread out, with 29.0% under the age of 18, 10.8% from 18 to 24, 30.4% from 25 to 44, 18.9% from 45 to 64, and 10.9% who were 65 years of age or older. The median age was 32 years. For every 100 females, there were 92.1 males. For every 100 females age 18 and over, there were 87.2 males.

The median income for a household in the city was $28,238, and the median income for a family was $35,592. Males had a median income of $27,240 versus $21,901 for females. The per capita income for the city was $13,892. About 15.8% of families and 19.2% of the population were below the poverty line, including 23.8% of those under age 18 and 17.8% of those age 65 or over.

== Common Council ==
The Common Council of the City of Charlestown meets for its regular business meeting on the first Monday of the month, beginning at 6:30 p.m. in the council chambers of City Hall, located at 304 Main Cross Street, Charlestown, Indiana. The Council is the legislative body of the government of the City of Charlestown, responsible for drafting and approving ordinances and resolutions that affect all Charlestown residents.

=== Council members ===
- Councilperson At Large - Chuck Deaton
- District 1 Councilperson - Bo Bertram
- District 2 Councilperson - Ronald Blevins
- District 3 Councilperson - Shannon Elder
- District 4 Councilperson - Brian Hester

== Education ==
Charlestown has numerous public schools, under the Greater Clark County Schools school district. Notable schools include: Charlestown Elementary, Charlestown Middle School, and Charlestown High School. Charlestown has a public library, a branch of the Charlestown-Clark County Public Library.

== Notable people ==
- Michael Cleveland, award-winning bluegrass fiddle player
- Mary Garrett Hay, suffragist
- Steve Hamilton, former NBA and MLB player
- George Howk, Justice of the Indiana Supreme Court
- Jonathan Jennings, first Indiana state Governor
- Travis Meeks, front-man of Days of the New
- Nina Payne, an American dancer in 1920s Paris
- Zach Payne, member of the Indiana House of Representatives
- James Scott, Justice of the Indiana Supreme Court
- Jesse Vest, bass player, Days of the New, Tantric
- Days of the New, rock band
