= Kee House (Palo Alto, California) =

Historic house in California, United States

- U.S. National Register of Historic Places
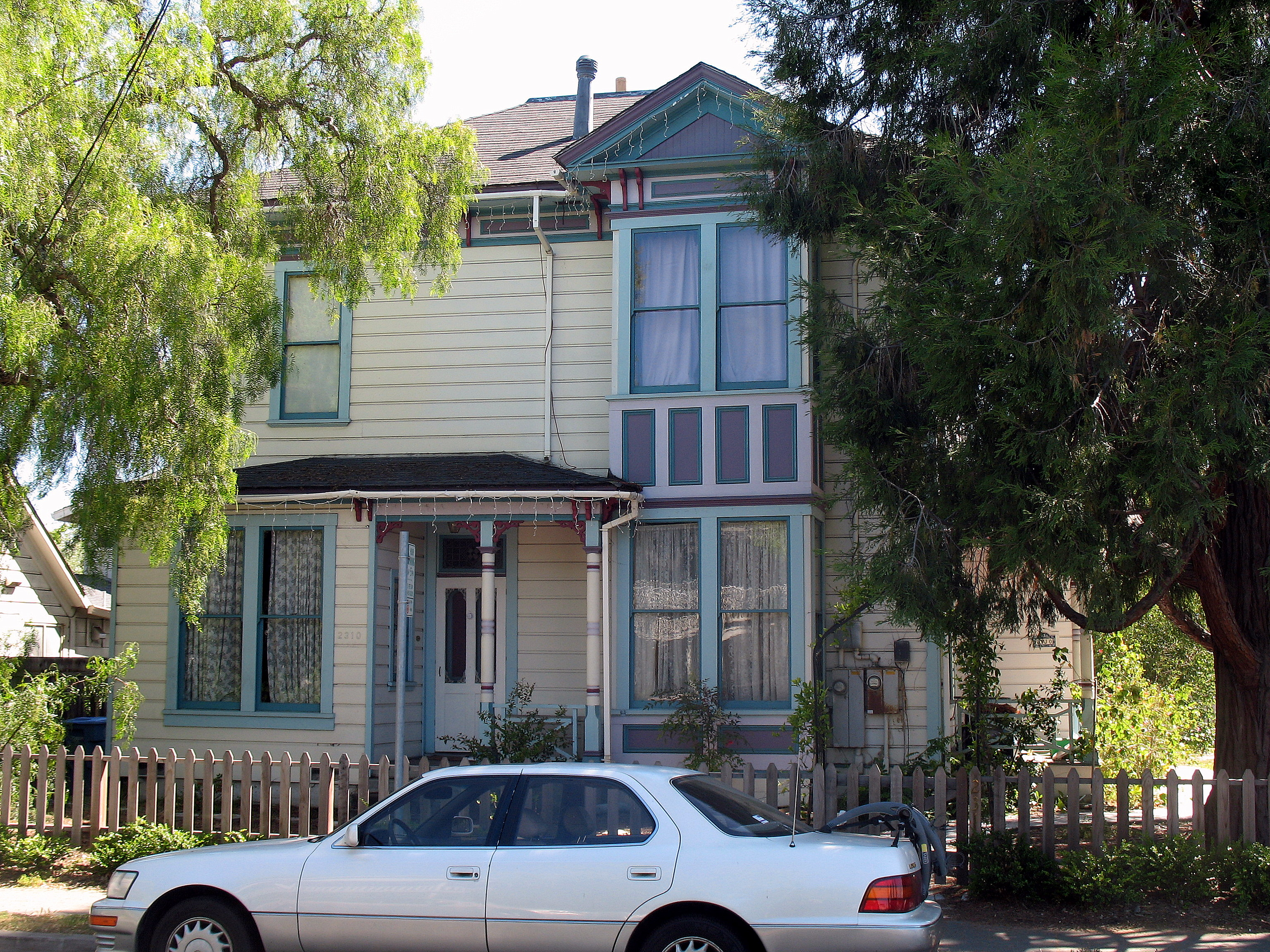

- Location within California Location within the United States
- Location: 2310 Yale St., Palo Alto, California
- Coordinates: 37°25′28.4″N 122°8′50.8″W
- Area: 0.2 acres (0.081 ha)
- Built: 1889
- Architectural style: Eastlake, Italianate
- NRHP reference No.: 85000715
- Added to NRHP: April 11, 1985

The Kee House is a historic house located at 2310 Yale St. in Palo Alto, California. Built in 1889, it is one of the oldest houses in Palo Alto and the oldest surviving building from Mayfield, a village that predated Palo Alto and was later annexed into the city. The house was one of the first built in the College Terrace tract, a middle-class residential area named for its proximity to Stanford University. The two-story house has an Italianate design with Eastlake elements. The front and side porches feature carved brackets and turned posts; the rear entrance originally had a similar porch. The hip roof features double brackets and a frieze below its eaves.

The house was added to the National Register of Historic Places on April 11, 1985.
