= Eugenia Wang =

Biologist

Eugenia Wang (born February 26, 1945) is the Gheens Endowed Chair on Aging at the University of Louisville School of Medicine. Her primary focus is researching the genetic aspect of aging in humans. She was among the first researchers who discovered the parts of the human genome that could either accelerate or slow the process of apoptosis.

== Early life ==
Wang was born in Nanking, China during the Chinese Civil War. Due to her country's internal strife, she and her mother and three siblings were forced to evacuate to Hanyang then Guangzhou. When she was three, they moved to Taipei, Taiwan. Eventually her father joined them and remained there until 1967.

Eugenia Wang became professor of anatomy at McGill University in 1988, where she worked on the cell biology of aging at the Lady Davis Institute of the Montreal Jewish General Hospital.

== Selected publications ==
- Bates, D. J., Li, N., Liang, R., Sarojini, H., An, J., Masternak, M. M., Bartke, A., and Wang, E. MicroRNA regulation in Ames dwarf mouse liver is linked to delayed ageing. Aging Cell 9(1):1 - 18. (2010). PMID 19878148; NIHMSID: 158218.
- Khanna, A., Muthusamy, S., Liang, R., Sarojini, H., and Wang, E. Gain of survival signaling by down-regulation of three key miRNAs in brain of calorie-restricted mice. Aging 3(3): 223 - 236 (2011). PMID 21415464.
- Li, N., Bates, D. J., An, J., and Wang, E. Up-regulation of key microRNAs and the inverse down-regulation of their potential target genes of oxidative phosphorylation during aging in mouse brains. Neurobiology of Aging 32: 944–955 (2011). PMID 19487051.
- Liang, R., Khanna, A., Muthusamy, S., Li, N., Sarojini, H., Kopchick, J., Masternak, M.M., Bartke, A., and Wang, E. Posttranscriptional regulation of IGF1R by key microRNAs in longlived mutant mice. Aging Cell. 10(6): 1080-1088 (2011). PMID 21967153.
- Liang, R. and Wang E. Full-length 3' Un-Translated Region reporter construction with recombineering. Analytical Biochemistry. 424: 162-167 (2012) PMID 22366478
