= Allan Butterfield =

American biological chemist

- Born: January 14, 1946 (age 80); Brownville, Maine, U.S.
- Spouse: Maria Tuthill (m. 1968)
- Children: 1

Academic background
- Education: BA, 1968, University of Maine; PhD, 1974, Duke University
- Thesis: Spin Label Investigations of Model and Biological Membranes (1974)

David Allan Butterfield (born January 14, 1946) is an American biological chemist. During the COVID-19 pandemic, Butterfield was named among the world's leading Alzheimer's disease experts by Expertscape, an online base of biomedical expertise. He is a Fellow of the Society for Free Radical Biology and Medicine.

== Early life and education ==
Butterfield was born on January 14, 1946 to father Francis Butterfield in Brownville, Maine. He attended Brownville Junction High School where he was elected president of the Future Teachers of America Club as a senior.

Butterfield graduated from the University of Maine in 1968 as a member of the Phi Beta Kappa, Phi Kappa Phi honor society, and the American Chemical Society. Following this, he enrolled at Duke University for his PhD and became an National Institutes of Health (NIH) Postdoctoral Fellow in Neuroscience from Duke University School of Medicine. Upon graduating, Butterfield and his wife Maria left for Rhodesia on a teaching assignment. He taught all of the secondary school mathematics classes in Murewa while his wife Marcia taught six classes of English and was in charge of the library. Upon returning from their mission, Butterfield was hospitalized for hepatitis.

== Career ==
Butterfield accepted a faculty position at the University of Kentucky (UK) in 1975. He continued his research on dystrophy from Duke as an assistant professor of chemistry. In his laboratory, his research on muscular dystrophy indicated to him that the disease is one that affects all the cells of the body. In 1986, Butterfield was named director of the University of Kentucky Research Center for Membrane Sciences. His research and teaching was recognized by the White House in 1998 with the Presidential Award for Science Mathematics and Engineering Mentoring.

At the turn of the 21st century, Butterfield found evidence suggesting that vitamin E could help prevent Alzheimer's disease. His research, funded by the National Institutes of Health (NIH), came to this conclusion by comparing amyloid beta peptide in an animal model to the same compound in humans. Later, he was appointed chair of the Neural Oxidative Metabolism and Death Study Section of the Center for Scientific Review (CSR) of the NIH. In 2012, Butterfield was named a UK Alumni Association Endowed Professor of Biological Chemistry and was elected a Fellow of the Society for Free Radical Biology and Medicine. As a result of his research into Alzheimer's disease, Butterfield was also the recipient of the society's Mentoring Excellence Award and 2013 Discovery Award.

During the COVID-19 pandemic, Butterfield was named among the world's leading Alzheimer's disease experts by Expertscape, an online base of biomedical expertise. He is among the top 0.007% of scholars worldwide based on authorship of Alzheimer's-related publications indexed in the PubMed database and ranked tenth out of nearly 150,000 scholars worldwide and sixth in the United States.

== Personal life ==
Butterfield met his wife Maria while attending the University of Maine on November 6, 1965. They married upon graduating in 1968 and have one daughter together. Prior to her retirement, Maria worked as a nurse.
