= Thomas L. Maddin =

American physician (1826–1908)

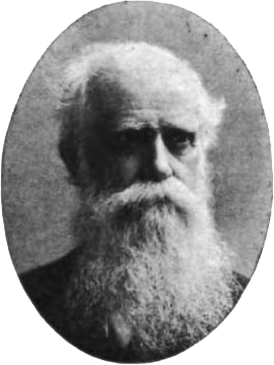
- Born: September 4, 1826; Columbia, Tennessee, U.S.
- Died: April 27, 1908 (aged 81); Nashville, Tennessee, U.S.
- Education: LaGrange College; University of Louisville
- Occupation: Physician
- Political party: Democratic Party
- Parent(s): Thomas Maddin; Sarah Moore

Thomas L. Maddin (1826–1908) was an American physician. He treated African-American slaves in Alabama in the antebellum era. He served as the director of a hospital for the Confederate States Army in Nashville, Tennessee, during the American Civil War. He was a professor of medicine at the University of Nashville and the Vanderbilt University School of Medicine.

== Early life ==
Thomas L. Maddin was born on September 4, 1826, in Columbia, Tennessee. His father, Reverend Thomas Maddin, was a pastor of the Methodist Episcopal Church, South. His mother was Sarah Moore. He was of Scotch-Irish descent on his paternal side.

Maddin graduated from LaGrange College (now known as the University of North Alabama) in 1845. He attended the medical school at the University of Louisville from 1847 to 1849, when he received an M. D.

== Career ==
Maddin practiced medicine under Dr. Jonathan McDonald in Limestone County, Alabama. He treated 20 black slaves on Luke Pryor's plantation who were ill with typhoid. He subsequently fell ill with malaria.

Maddin joined the Tennessee Medical State Society in Nashville, Tennessee, in 1853. The following year, in 1854, he taught a class of 100 at the University of Nashville. He was a professor of anatomy at Shelby Medical College from 1857 to 1861, and a professor of surgery from 1858 to 1861.

During the American Civil War of 1861–1865, he was the director of a hospital for personnel of the Confederate States Army.

Maddin was a professor in the medical school at the University of Nashville from 1867 to 1873. When it merged with Vanderbilt University in 1873, he served professor of practice of medicine and clinical medicine as well as president of the faculty until 1895. As the medical school re-joined the University of Nashville in 1895, Maddin served as its chair of nervous diseases and general pathology until 1905.

Maddin served as the editor of the Monthly Record of Medicine and Surgery. He was a member of the Democratic Party.

== Death ==
Maddin died on April 27, 1908, in Nashville, Tennessee.
