= Snitch Newsweekly =

Snitch was a free, alternative weekly newspaper published in parts of the United States covering crime and police news. Perhaps the most notable feature was the ZIP Code Crime Watch, which gave brief, usually sarcastic commentary on hundreds of items in the weekly police reports, broken down by ZIP codes, along with crime totals for the respective areas. Snitch also ran numerous crime-themed articles in each issue, as well as advertisements and classifieds.

== History ==
Joseph Grove, a journalist in Louisville, Kentucky, developed the concept in 2000 with co-founders Mary Jacobson and Tim Sanford. The concept was inspired by a reference in Genius in Disguise (1995), Thomas Kunkel's biography of New Yorker founder Harold Ross, who had briefly contemplated starting a dedicated crime newspaper in New York City.

Snitch was started in Louisville, Kentucky, and the Media Audit showed 211,000 readers as of January 2005. There were also editions of the paper in Lexington, Kentucky, Northern Kentucky, Cincinnati, Ohio, San Diego, California, Savannah, Georgia, and South Carolina.

In December 2004, the parent company, a venture capital firm named Prosperitas, pulled out of the concept, and the Louisville edition was sold to Tim Woodburn, who owned the Lexington edition. Woodburn continued to publish in Louisville and Lexington, while the Savannah, Northern Kentucky, and San Diego, and editions had all stopped publishing (in October 2004, November 2004, and February 2005, respectively). The Columbia, South Carolina, edition continues to be published by Jim Shine and Jerry Adams on an intermittent basis.

In May 2005, the executive editor Richard Des Ruisseaux retired, having run the Louisville edition since its founding.

In July 2005, Louisville Crime, LLC, the new owners of Snitch, announced that they had been unable to reach agreement with the former owners about certain issues, so Louisville Snitch ceased publication immediately as of that date. The announcement said the paper would reopen late Fall 2005, under a new name, although this apparently did not happen.

In December 2005, Lexington Snitch also ceased publication, citing lack of advertising revenue and pledging a replacement, The Lexington Times, in spring 2006. The Lexington Times had not published a single edition as of February 2007.
