= Kee Chang Huang =

Kee Chang Huang (July 22, 1917 in Canton, China – November 25, 1998) was a Distinguished Professor at the University of Louisville.

He is the author of three books, Absorption, Distribution, Transformation and Excretion of Drugs, Outline of Pharmacology, and The Pharmacology of Chinese Herbs, and many research papers. He retired from the university in 1989, but remained active in research.
