= Chris Garten =

American politician

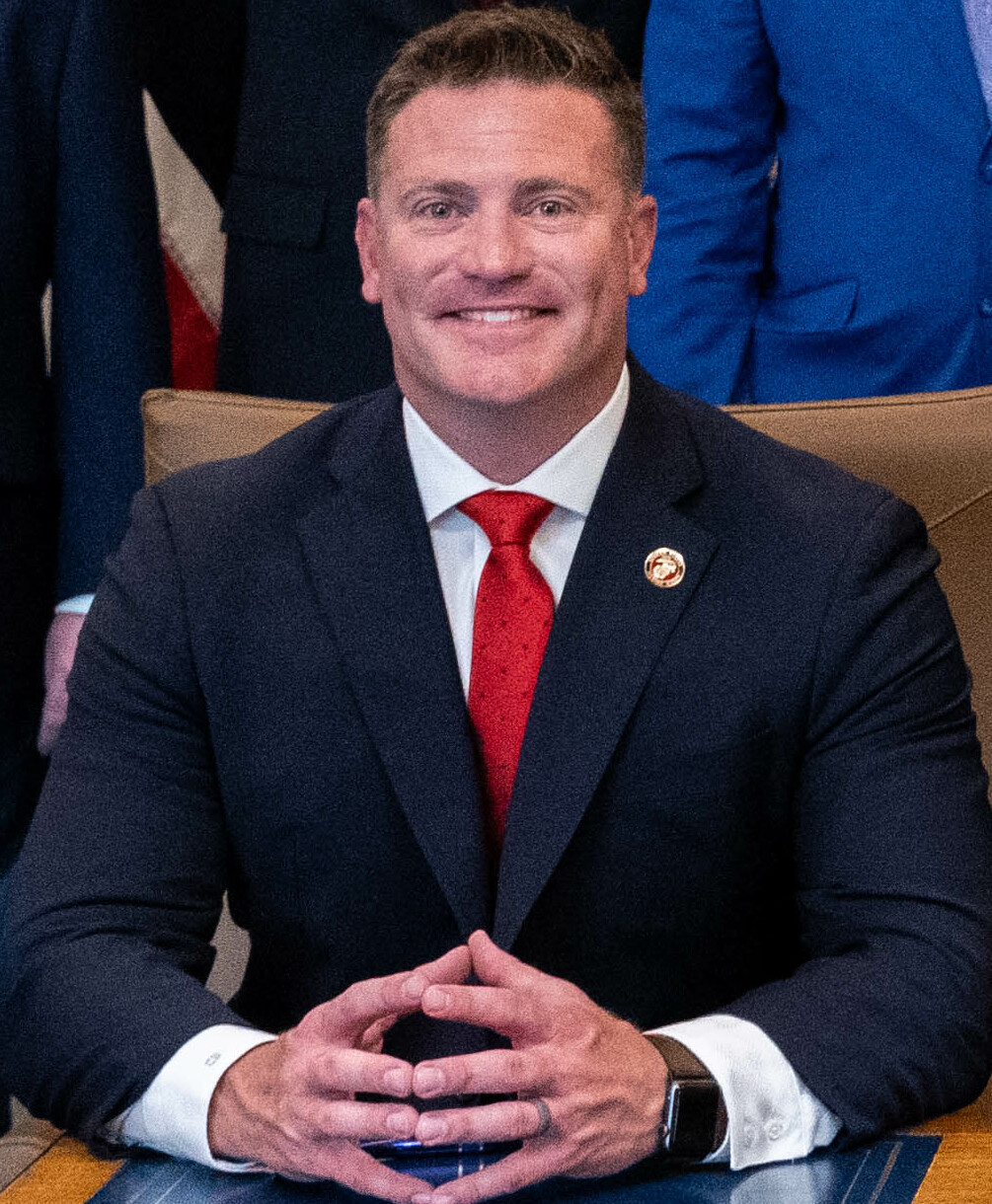

President pro tempore of the Indiana Senate
- Incumbent
- Assumed office November 17, 2026
- Preceded by: Rod Bray

Majority Leader of the Indiana Senate
- In office August 17, 2022 – June 4, 2026
- Preceded by: Mark Messmer
- Succeeded by: Eric Koch

Member of the Indiana Senate from the 45th district
- Incumbent
- Assumed office November 7, 2018
- Preceded by: Jim Smith

Personal details
- Born: February 13, 1982 (age 44) Fort Lauderdale, Florida, U.S.
- Party: Republican
- Spouse: Beth
- Children: 3
- Education: Indiana University, Southeast

Military service
- Allegiance: United States
- Branch/service: United States Marine Corps
- Battles/wars: Iraq War

Chris Garten is an American politician. Garten was first elected in November 2018 to represent District 45 in the Indiana Senate and served as Majority Floor Leader from 2022 to 2026. He is a member of the Republican Party.

== Early life and education ==
Garten was raised in Lexington, Indiana, and graduated from Scottsburg Senior High School in 2000. He attended Indiana University Southeast, but his college education was interrupted by his military service. In August 2023, he completed his undergraduate studies and earned his bachelor's degree through Indiana University Southeast's degree reclamation program.

== Military service ==
Garten served in the United States Marine Corps Reserve for 14 years with broken time between 2001 and 2021, which included two combat tours in Iraq. He separated from the service as a gunnery sergeant. At various times he held the billet of platoon commander and scout patrol leader.

== Career ==
In 2007, shortly after returning home from his second deployment, Garten founded Signature Countertops, Inc. in Jeffersonville, Indiana, and remains the company's owner and president.

== Elected office ==
Garten was first elected to the Indiana Senate in November 2018. In August 2022, during his first term, Garten was appointed as Senate Majority Floor Leader by Senate President Pro Tempore Rodric Bray. He was soon after re-elected for a second term in November 2022. In addition to his leadership position within the Senate Republican caucus, Garten chairs the Senate Committee on Joint Rules, serves as Ranking Member for the Senate Rules & Legislative Procedure Committee, serves on the Senate Committee on Appropriations and sits on the State Budget Committee. In 2023, he also chaired the Health Care Cost Oversight Task Force and Government Reform Task Force. As of April 2024, Garten had authored or sponsored over 80 bills that became law. He resigned as floor leader in June 2026, citing disagreements with the chamber's leadership.

== Statewide & community involvement ==
Garten is a board member for the One Southern Indiana Advocacy Council, Scott County Public Defender Board and Darkhorse Expeditions. He previously served as Vice-President of the Scott County Chamber of Commerce and on the Indiana Builders Association Board. He is a lifetime member of the National Rifle Association and Veterans of Foreign Wars. Garten is also a member of the American Legion, Marine Corps League, Indiana Farm Bureau, Indiana Builders Association and National Federation of Independent Business.

== Honors & awards ==
In 2024, Garten was included in the "Indiana Power 50" list published by State Affairs and Howey Politics. In 2023, Garten was named "Legislator of the Year" by the Indiana State Police Alliance and received the "Commitment to Excellence" award from the Indiana Association of Counties. In 2022, Garten was named "Legislator of the Year" by the Indiana Bankers Association and the Disabled American Veterans. He was also named "Senator of the Year" by Aviation Indiana.

In 2021, the Indiana Builders Association presented Garten with the "John C. Hart Presidential Award". In 2017, One Southern Indiana presented Garten with their "James W. Robinson Young Professional of the Year Award" and Garten graduated from the Indiana Leadership Forum.

== Elections ==
=== 2018 ===
Indiana Senate District 45 Republican primary, May 8, 2018
Party	Candidate	Votes	%
Republican	Chris Garten	7,324	100.00
Total votes		7,324	100.00

Indiana Senate District 45 general election, November 6, 2018
Party	Candidate	Votes	%
Republican	Chris Garten	30,357	62.72
Democratic	John Perkins	16,493	34.07
Libertarian	Charles Johnson	1,554	3.21
Total votes		48,404	100.00

=== 2022 ===
Indiana Senate District 45 Republican primary, May 3, 2022
Party	Candidate	Votes	%
Republican	Chris Garten (incumbent)	6,228	100.00
Total votes		6,228	100.00

Indiana Senate District 45 general election, November 8, 2022
Party	Candidate	Votes	%
Republican	Chris Garten (incumbent)	25,767	62.07
Democratic	Nick Marshall	15,746	37.93
Total votes		41,513	100.00

=== 2026 ===
Indiana Senate District 45 Republican primary, May 5, 2026
Party	Candidate	Votes	%
Republican	Chris Garten (incumbent)	6,981	100.00
Total votes		6,981	100.00

Indiana Senate District 45 general election, November 3, 2026 (unofficial results)
Party	Candidate	Votes	%
Republican	Chris Garten (incumbent)	21,817	49.21
Democratic	Nick Marshall	21,520	48.55
Libertarian	Larry Mahaney	993	2.24
Total votes		44,330	100.00

Indiana Senate
Preceded by Mark Messmer	Majority Leader of the Indiana Senate; 2022–2026	Vacant
